= The Muckers =

English football hooligan firm

Blackpool Muckers

The Muckers are a football hooligan firm linked to the football club Blackpool F.C. They take their name from the word mucker, a colloquialism meaning good friend.

Although Blackpool is a relatively small club, there is a long history of hooliganism, which had all but disappeared until recent times. Part of the reasons given for this history of violence is that a feature of Blackpool life is fighting, especially as in the summer months groups of young men would visit the resort, giving the locals ample opportunity to fight whenever they wanted. Benny, one of the leaders of another firm associated with Blackpool, Bennys Mob stated that "Blackpool is full of mobs, especially in the Summer. You could easily be fighting every week." Whilst many other Firms have retained the same name throughout their history such as the Chelsea Headhunters or the Inter City Firm who follow West Ham, there have been a number of names for the various firms who follow Blackpool—Rammy Arms Crew, Bennys Mob, BISONS (or Bisons Riot Squad), and now The Muckers.

== History ==
In 1985, when hooliganism was rife in England, the BBC Six O'Clock News had a special report in which they listed the worst Football gangs creating mayhem across England. They listed the six worst clubs:

- Millwall F.C.
- Chelsea F.C.
- Leeds United A.F.C.
- Bristol City F.C.
- Blackpool F.C.
- West Ham United F.C.

It was the culmination of years of hooliganism surrounding Blackpool.

=== Kevin Olsson ===
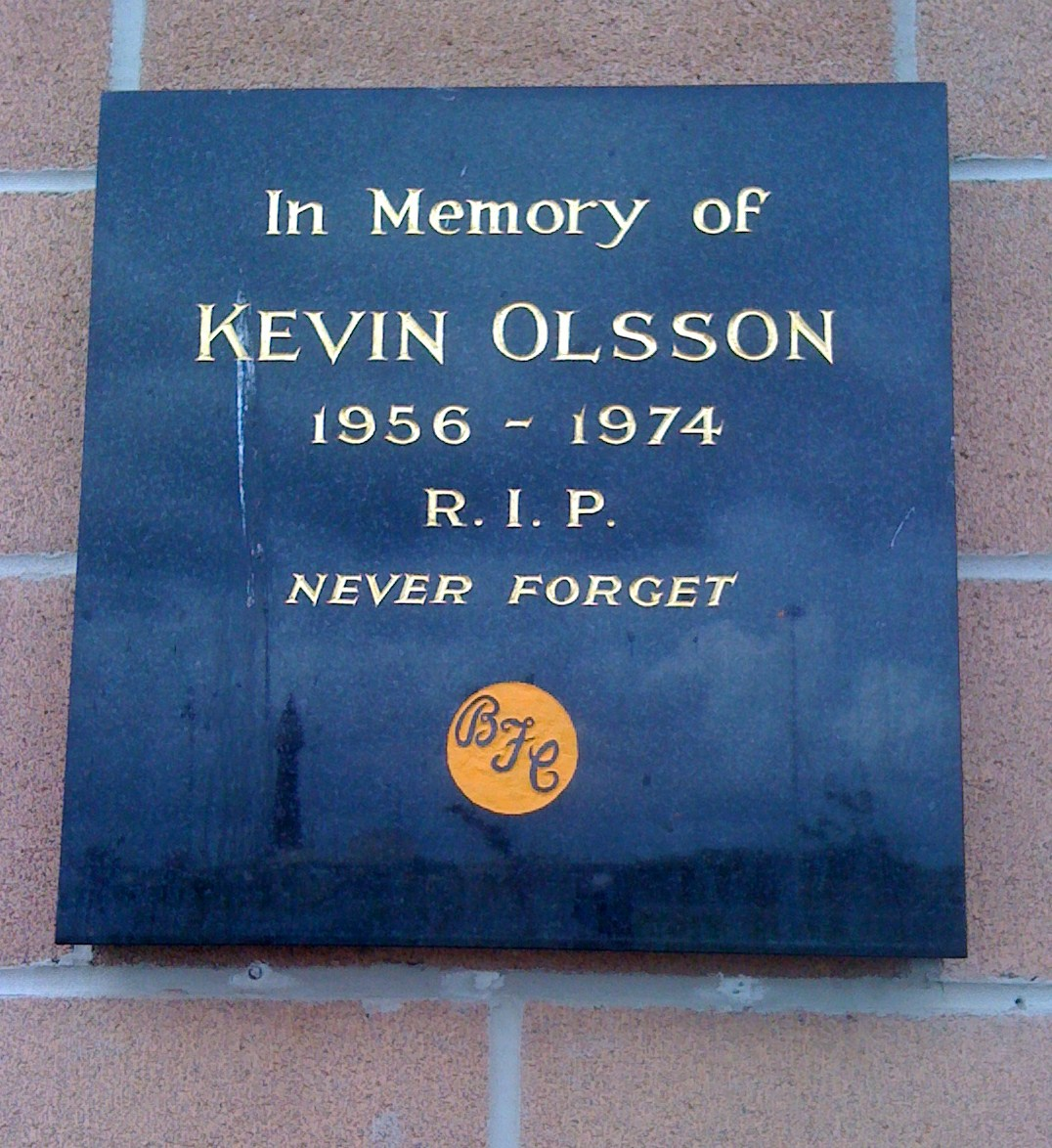
A plaque commemorating the Blackpool supporter who was fatally stabbed during a match at Bloomfield Road

On 24 August 1974, seventeen-year-old Blackpool fan Kevin Olsson was stabbed to death at the back of the Spion Kop, Bloomfield Road at Blackpool's home match with Bolton Wanderers.

In 2009, Blackpool supporters raised money for a memorial plaque for Olsson. In August of that year, on the 35th anniversary of his death, the plaque was unveiled on the front of the North-West Corner, beside the club shop.

=== Rammy Arms Crew era ===
The first organised Firm, known as the Rammy Arms Crew, began in those years, taking their name from the pub they drank in, the Ramsden Arms, opposite Blackpool North Railway Station.

The Rammys' most famous moment was when they led the England fans charge into Italians in Turin at the Italy versus England match in 1980. As a result of which, at least one member of the Rammy Arms Crew would later adorn the jacket cover of one of the first hooligan books, Hooligans Abroad, by John Williams.

In the late 1970s as punk rock became popular in the UK, football fans would also attend Punk Rock concerts. And in 1978 at a concert in Blackburn King Georges Hall a Skids concert (incorrectly reported as being The Dickies) was the scene of a near full-scale riot as a group of about 50 Blackpool fans (Rammy boys) clashed with over 250 Blackburn Rovers fans, disrupting the concert, before riot police were called in to restore order, as reported in the local Blackpool Evening Gazette. Then on 6 May 1978 at a concert by The Vibrators in Preston a young man from Preston was stabbed to death during clashes between Preston and Blackpool fans. This ushered in a new era of hatred between fans of the two clubs, following the attempts by Blackpool fans to burn down the Town End at Prestons Deepdale stadium the year before, when two fires were lit during a match between the two clubs.

=== Benny's Mob era ===
In 1978, Blackpool were relegated to the third tier of English football for the first time. Around the same time, a new, younger gang appeared, known as "Benny's Mob". Led by Benny, they would take on firms from numerous other clubs; in August 1980, a group of about 150 Benny's Mob met up with the Pompey Skins from Portsmouth at Blackpools Coach Park. They also clashed with Sheffield United fans in 1982, when a Sheffield fan was stabbed during clashes between fans in the West Paddock at Bloomfield Road, while police were already dealing with an incident in the South Stand involving the Rammy Arms Crew. The Blackpool Evening Gazette headline ran "Fan sought after Pool stabbing" as the police tried to find the person(s) responsible.

However, it was in 1984 that the Blackpool hooligans started to earn their reputation. In March, Rochdale F.C. were totally overwhelmed when 3,000 Blackpool fans descended on their Spotland Stadium when they usually had crowds of about 1,300. A mob of Blackpool fans went on the rampage causing "A trail of havoc" according to the Manchester Evening News headlines who continued, "21 cars were damaged, two parked vehicles overturned and 4 police cars damaged." By April 1984 according to the Blackpool Evening Gazette, the police were worried about an army of about 200 hooligans and vowed to drive them out.

In May 1984, Rammy Arms Crew and Benny's Mob led a weekend of violence and chaos in the seaside town of Torquay. Police had made the game a 7:30 pm Saturday kick-off with Torquay United to try to avoid trouble, but it backfired totally as hordes of Blackpool fans travelled down on the Friday instead and stayed over until Sunday, where they caused 24 hours of carnage. The local Torquay newspaper headline read, "Soccer Mob Storms Resort". Sixty-one Blackpool fans were arrested, 5 people treated for stab wounds, including a man from Liverpool who was attacked with a carpet knife and received a 15-inch wound. Thousands of pounds' worth of damage was done to the town with The Yacht House pub wrecked and a nightclub front demolished. Two Rammy Arms members were convicted of stealing a four-poster bed from a luxury hotel. Helen Chamberlain, a presenter of Sky Sports Soccer AM show, and a Torquay United fan, would many years later on the show state that "Blackpool fans are mad".

The following season saw Benny's Mob again involved in numerous fights. It also saw Blackpool charged twice by The FA, who held two inquiries into the Blackpool fans' behaviour. Both times the club themselves were exonerated from blame.

In February 1985, Benny's Mob took revenge in Chester for an earlier season attack on them by Chester City fans. The game was held up for 15 minutes when a pre-planned invasion of 200 Blackpool fans ran onto the pitch toward the Chester fans. The police called in reinforcements, but were pelted by bricks, stones, broken terrace barriers and a corner flag which had been uprooted and used as a weapon. The referee was also attacked. Two crash barriers were uprooted, a refreshment hut wrecked and stand seats torn out. The first FA disciplinary inquiry was instigated.

The following month, 3,000 Blackpool fans went to a match at Bury. Again, what seemed like another carefully planned attack took place. "An orgy of violence, theft and destruction" reported the Blackpool Evening Gazette. After Bury had scored a goal, Blackpool fans at one side stand started to wreck the stand, which received extensive damage whilst another group of Blackpool (Rammy Arms Crew) fans behind one goal also started to riot. All to chants of "Smash it up, smash it up, smash it up". Pieces of the stand were thrown onto the pitch and yet another referee had to take the players off the pitch. A brick wall was demolished and pushed onto parked cars as the police held the Blackpool fans in the ground after the match. Sixty-four Blackpool fans were arrested and five police officers hurt. Yet another disciplinary inquiry was instigated.

=== Bisons Riot Squad era ===
Another gang appeared in this period, known as the BISONS or Bisons Riot Squad (BRS). They allegedly took their name from the noise they made when attacking rivals. They soon earned a reputation for carrying knives, with four people slashed at a game in Brighton. Furthermore, one of the principal Blackpool BISONS members was reported to have taken a gun from one of the younger BISONS gang before they set off for Brighton. It resulted in 3 fans being banned from every football ground in England, the first time the Courts had made such bans.

Another opportunity for revenge on Bolton Wanderers arose in the 1985–86 season, when they played them at home on Boxing Day 1985. It was the first time the two clubs had met in a number of years. It brought out the different gangs with them all joining up with other local gangs from Fleetwood, Bispham and other areas on the Fylde Coast. One of the first things they did that day was to attack the Ramsden Arms pub, even though it was the drinking and meeting place for the Rammy Arms Crew. However, a group of Bolton fans unwittingly had come off their train and gone into the Ramsden Arms for a pre-match drink. According to the Blackpool Evening Gazette, "Windows were smashed as louts hurled snooker balls and cues through the expensive lead weighted windows" as they attacked the Bolton fans inside. Blackpool had 100s out that day and a number of battles took place in and around the ground.

Around this time the gangs had fights with the fans of bigger clubs like Manchester City, and would regularly fight the Leeds United Service Crew (LSC) who had started visiting Blackpool on Bank Holiday weekends. In 1985, more than 50 were arrested as Benny's Mob planned an attack on the LSC as a major riot ensued. A Blackpool fan was stabbed in his back in 1987. The local rivals have always been Preston North End and matches between the two clubs have usually resulted in trouble.

Blackpool played Bolton again for the first time for four years in 1989, and was again the cue for revenge attacks on Bolton fans in the Sherpa Van Trophy. The Bolton team coach was attacked, Police twice had to clear the pitch of fighting fans. In 1991 Benny was banned from football grounds for 3 years for fighting with Tottenham fans. For much of the 1990s there was no real organised hooligan firm.

=== 2005–06 ===
In Hooligans A-L Nick Lowles and Andy Nicholls state that for the past decade there has been no Firm in Blackpool and that Away fans have been left virtually to do as they wish in the town and at matches. However, since the book was published this has led to the development of The Muckers in 2005 when a group of 25 Blackpool fans, all friends, started to organise The Muckers Firm.

They very soon started to earn a reputation in an era when CCTV has severely restricted hooligan activity. The Blackpool Evening Gazette described the worst scenes of violence at Blackpool matches in years at a match against Nottingham Forest in February 2006 when Mounted Police had to separate fans as they clashed in the streets. 200 fans were involved in fights around The Castle Pub in Blackpool. After the game another 75 fans fought outside the Swift Hound Pub with both fights being blamed on Blackpool fans for instigating them.

The following week, after a Home game against Huddersfield Town, a coach carrying Huddersfield fans was attacked and a brick smashed the coach windows. This incident though has never been linked to The Muckers who themselves condemned the attack as it goes against their strict self-imposed "Hooligan Code" of not attacking innocent fans (what they term "Scarfers"). The local Police also did not link the attack stating, "This appears to have been a random, stupid, isolated attack. There is no link between this incident and the trouble at the previous home fixture with Nottingham Forest." Local reports would seem to suggest that this and other similar incidents since then are connected to a gang of youths from the area around the stadium.

In April 2006 seven Blackpool fans were arrested following the incidents at the Nottingham Forest game, and 12 Blackpool fans homes raided. No fans from Nottingham were arrested.

=== 2006–07 ===
Ahead of the home game against Nottingham Forest on 8 August 2006, Blackpool fans were banned from using The Castle Pub, and The Swift Hound pub had extra security as fears grew of a repeat of the violence in February. The landlord of The Castle Pub stated that he did not wish to see a repeat of the violence, stating that, "The Forest fans were just drinking. Then, out of nowhere, about 50 Blackpool fans charged in and started throwing punches and bottles. There was blood everywhere, my staff were terrified so I locked them in the back. The police were there in minutes and stopped it getting worse." This game though went ahead with a much increased police presence that prevented the large-scale violence repeating itself.

The rivalry with Preston fans reignited itself on Saturday 2 September 2006 when a mini-riot broke out on Preston railway station between Blackpool fans returning from their match at Millwall and local fans returning from an England match in Manchester. Bottles, cans and signs were hurled as the two sets of fans fought each other, and two British Transport Police (BTP) Officers were injured in what the police described as a large-scale disorder.

On 28 October 2006 Blackpool fans fought pitched battles with Bradford City fans before and after their home match when the Princess Hotel pub had all its windows smashed as Blackpool fans attacked the Bradford fans drinking inside.

Following a home match against Swansea City on 9 December 2006 two Police Officers were surrounded in The George pub by between 30 and 40 fans, and one officer assaulted before he pressed his panic button for reinforcements.

==== The Muckers controversy and the BNP ====
In November 2006 The Muckers were embroiled in controversy when they were alleged to have links with the far right British National Party (BNP) something which the BNP denied, and even with the British neo-Nazi paramilitary group Combat 18. The BNP held their annual conference at a hotel in Blackpool, where the pressure group Unite Against Fascism (UAF) planned to protest. Members of The Muckers were alleged to have said that they would smash the protest. Local police stated that they had intelligence and knew in advance of the planned attack. And Blackpool stated they would ban from Bloomfield Road anyone involved in attacking the UAF protest.

The Muckers always maintained that they had no intention of attacking the UAF protest, and that they had no links with either the BNP or Combat 18. A point especially relevant considering that one of the Muckers is of Asian origin. The UAF protest subsequently went ahead peacefully with no arrests.

Millwall were the visitors to Bloomfield Road on 24 February 2007, and, with the growing reputation of The Muckers, Millwall brought many more fans than they would normally bring. The police were fully prepared for there to be clashes between the two sets of fans, with far more police being on duty and even Intelligence Officers from the Metropolitan Police in London travelling to Blackpool to hunt down known hooligans. The large police presence and awareness of the potential for clashes prevented any large-scale violence which clearly otherwise would have happened. Both riot police and mounted police were employed after the game when the visiting Millwall fans were kept in the ground in an attempt by the police to avoid clashes. Unfortunately this only led to the Blackpool fans being able to prepare themselves, and a small number of about 25–30 Muckers and Bennys Mob attacked the Millwall fans.

The majority of The Muckers had already been surrounded in the Old Bridge pub, where they tried in vain to escape. The police though surrounded the pub, even the pubs roof to ensure no-one escaped. The remaining Muckers and Bennys Mob tried to attack the Millwall fans but severely outnumbered, they for the most part stood their ground, but were beaten back by the police. Up to 15 younger Blackpool Service Crew (BSC)—a separate Youth Firm, together with a couple of older members were alleged to have run, and local reports would suggest that main, older members of Bennys Mob and The Muckers dealt with them severely for doing so. There were a number of small fights in town centre pubs following the game with some Millwall fans staying the night in the resort. Several arrests were made for Public order offences.

=== 2007–08 ===
Blackpool were promoted to the Championship in the 2006–07 season, winning the Play-off Final at Wembley. Promotion ensured that the rivalry with near neighbours Preston North End and Burnley would once again happen on the pitch with each club being in The Championship in the 2007–08 season. And in June 2007, following threats by football hooligans, from Blackpool Muckers and from Preston, to cause mayhem when the two clubs meet next season, Prestons top Police officer, Chief Superintendent Mike Barton warned that "The history of these derbies means we will have to have a significant policing operation both at Deepdale and Bloomfield Road." The Muckers also warned that they would be out to cause trouble when they met Burnley. This has led to the police already making plans for "significant operations" at all matches involving the clubs.

On 11 July 2007, six fans appeared in Preston Crown Court, charged with various offences following the Nottingham Forest match in February 2006, all six were banned from every football ground in the UK. Two of them were jailed—one for three years (with two years suspended) for violent disorder, plus an eight-year football banning order; one was jailed for four months for a public order offence and also received a three-year football banning order. The other four were all given suspended prison sentences ranging from four to nine months, as well as community service, a two-month curfew and football banning orders of three and four years. The court had been shown video footage of what was described as "sickening scenes" when the Blackpool fans had targeted the Swift Hound pub on Rigby Road in Blackpool. CCTV footage showed the fans attacking doors and windows with bottles, glasses and garden furniture attempting to attack the Nottingham Forest fans inside the pub. Crown Court Judge, Norman Wright stated that, "It was no less than mayhem. The public house was besieged by a group of what I see to be Blackpool supporters. The fact nobody was injured was more by chance than design. I've heard how women and children inside ran to shelter in the kitchen in terror."

Blackpool police stated that the sentences were a result of a significant enquiry, adding a message about the forthcoming football season, "Come to enjoy the football and Blackpool will make you most welcome. Come to cause trouble and we will tackle you."

Following the conviction of the six fans, Blackpool Police's Football Intelligence unit revealed, on 13 July 2007, that they were also investigating video footage from the clashes with Millwall fans and an additional match at Bloomfield Road against Scunthorpe United where violent clashes took place in an effort to identify and prosecute those involved stating that on top of the six convicted, two further fans were given three year football banning orders, and that they once they knew the identities of those involved, arrests would be made.

The Muckers hit the headlines in Blackpool again in September 2007 when the local newspaper, the Blackpool Gazette ran a front-page headline story, "Thugs to defy derby ban" about members of the firm apparently defying bans from attending the Lancashire derby game against Burnley at Turf Moor on 15 September, the first time the two clubs have met in five years. Twenty five letters were sent to suspected Blackpool thugs by Blackpool Police as part of a high-profile police operation ahead of the game. The letters were sent in an attempt to stop the fans attending the game. However, apparently members of The Muckers taunted the police on their own message board, boasting that they would defy the letters and attend the game, even if it meant concealing their identity, and stating that members of the firm had received the warning letters even though they had no convictions related to football hooliganism. Blackpool Police responded by saying, "On their head be it. There have been letters sent out and those who have received them have got them for a reason. They have been sent out as a deterrent to people who we have had problems with in the past for organising trouble or being involved in trouble. We will have spotters at the game as we do all away games, but will have more at this fixture because it is Burnley and there will be a big attendance. Our spotters know many of them personally and have had dealings with them in the past."

The following day, Blackpool manager Simon Grayson made a public plea for fans to get behind the club at the match in Burnley, but to be on their best behaviour, saying, "I am sure they will have a terrific day and it will be an outstanding atmosphere. We've had a great following at every game and I'm sure the 4,000 fans there will enjoy it—but behave yourselves." Blackpool confirmed that they backed the police campaign to clamp down on hooliganism surrounding Blackpool matches, stating, "We want Bloomfield Road to be a friendly place where families can come and enjoy the games and we will do everything in our power to make sure that is the case." Burnley Police confirmed that they had targeted what they saw as risk fans warning that any fans causing trouble would be arrested, and Blackpool Police confirmed that they were "monitoring online chat rooms and message boards to gather as much information as possible".

A Home Office report in October 2007 revealed a 300% increase in the number of Blackpool fans arrested in the 2006–07 season from the previous season. In the 2005–06 season there were twelve football-related arrests made whereas the following season 34 people were taken into custody either at games or outside the ground. A rise that overshadowed other local clubs such as Preston North End with 27 arrests and Premier League club Blackburn Rovers with 21 arrests. Blackpool Police put the high number of arrests down to the large increase in attendances at Blackpool games, adding that many home games in the 2007–08 season were being sold out. Also adding, "The increase in arrests is encouraging and sends a clear message to people that behaving badly will not be tolerated."

In November 2007 Blackpool police warned football hooligans not to attend the local derby against Preston North End in Preston on 8 December 2007. The Blackpool Gazette reported on 17 November how comments on a Message Board used by The Muckers claimed that Blackpool fans were planning to infiltrate the home stands at the Deepdale stadium in Preston. The match had already been moved forward to a 12:30pm kick-off at the request of the police in an attempt to avoid violence and local pubs told not to open until 12:00pm and not to serve alcohol until 12:30pm, the same time as the kick-off. A huge police operation on match day resulted in 300 police officers being on duty outside the Deepdale stadium and in Preston city centre. Blackpool fans arriving at Preston railway station went through airport-style security scanners to check for potential weapons. Blackpool won the match 1–0, but the day was marred when Blackpool hooligans went on a rampage smashing windows and ripping seats out of specially chartered buses laid on to transport them from the railway station to Deepdale, causing thousands of pounds' worth of damage. Nine people were arrested. Later that same day, a group of about 30 Preston hooligans attacked a pub in Blackpool in "revenge" throwing bins and bottles at the pub while the Blackpool fans hid inside.

In 2009/10 saw a minibus of Preston fans turn up at the windmill pub in Layton, the majority of Blackpool fans had left, leaving a few to finish their pints, a small melee occurred but nothing of note.

== Main rivals ==
Blackpool's main rivals are:

- Preston North End F.C.
- Burnley F.C.
- Bolton Wanderers F.C.

== See also ==
- Casual (subculture)
- Football hooliganism
- List of hooligan firms
- Hooliganism
- Millwall Bushwackers
- Aston Villa Hardcore
