= List of hooligan firms =

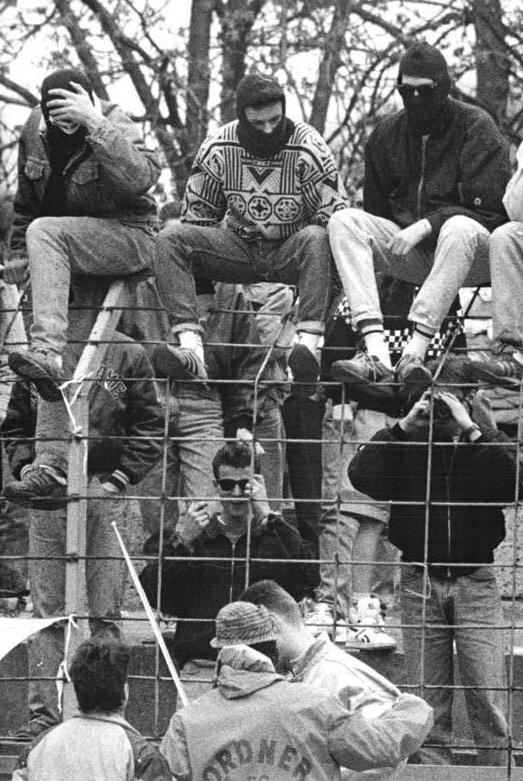
Hooligans of FC Berlin with masked faces during a match between FC Carl Zeiss Jena and FC Berlin in 1990.

Hooligan firms (also known as football firms) are groups that participate in football hooliganism in European countries. For groups in Latin America, see barra brava and torcida organizada.

== Australia ==
- Melbourne Victory - Horda, Nomadi, M3
- Western Sydney Wanderers - Amok, Northgate, Westie Youth

== Belgium ==
- Club Brugge – East Side
- RSC Anderlecht – O Side
- Royal Antwerp F.C. – X Side

== Bosnia and Herzegovina ==
- FK Sarajevo – Horde Zla
- FK Željezničar Sarajevo – The Maniacs
- FK Velež – Red Army Mostar
- FK Borac Banja Luka – Lešinari
- NK Široki Brijeg – Škripari
- HŠK Zrinjski – Ultras Mostar
- FK Sloboda Tuzla – Fukare Tuzla
- NK Čelik Zenica – Robijaši
- NK Jedinstvo Bihać – Sila Nebeska
- FK Slavija Sarajevo – Sokolovi

== Bulgaria ==
- Levski Sofia – Sector B
- CSKA Sofia – Sector G
- Botev Plovdiv – Bultras
- Lokomotiv Plovdiv – Lauta Army
- Cherno More Varna – The Sailors
- Spartak Varna – The Falcons
- Neftochimic Burgas – The Sheiks
- Minyor Pernik – The Hammers
- Beroe Stara Zagora – Zara Boys

== Croatia ==
- Dinamo Zagreb – Bad Blue Boys
- Hajduk Split – Torcida Split, White Boys
- Osijek – Kohorta Osijek
- Rijeka – Armada Rijeka

== Czech Republic ==
- Baník Most – Brüx Vandals, Radical Boys
- Baník Ostrava – Silesian Hunters, Apple Commando, Thor Division, Barabi, Marienbad Ultras
- Bohemians 1905 – Berserk, Tornado Boys
- Dukla Prague – Young Hunters
- Dynamo České Budějovice – Brigade Gauners
- Jablonec – Corps Juniors
- SFC Opava – Chalupáři, Young Boys, Bulldog Corps
- Sigma Olomouc – NSC 88, Tarzan Boys Olomouc, Hooligans Hovada Zubr, Ultras Nové Sady, Zubr Gang Prerov
- Slavia Prague – Youngsters, Brigate 97, Slavia Hooligans, Tlupa Toma Sojera, RWS
- Slovan Liberec – Kategorie S, Ultras Liberec, D.B.S.
- Sparta Prague – Prague Boys, Youth Firm, Falanga, Brigade Drápek z Lasičky, Ultras Sparta, Red Pirates Sparta, Frakce Rudý Úder
- Teplice – Division Nord, North Warriors
- Viktoria Plzeň – Service Squad, Blue-Red Wolves Plzeň, Pilsen Bo!s, Radikálové Plzeň, Pilsen Fans
- Viktoria Žižkov – Ultras Viktoria
- Zbrojovka Brno – Division S, Johny Kentus Gang, Orthodox Fans Brno, Torcida, Ultras

== Denmark ==
- AGF – White Pride, Aarhus Casuals
- Aab – Aalborg Frontline, Aalborg Casual Youth
- Esbjerg fB – Esbjerg Supras
- F.C. København – Copenhagen Casuals, Copenhagen Casuals Young Boys
- Lyngby Boldklub – Blue Army
- Randers FC – Randers Casual Youth

== England ==
- AFC Bournemouth – Bournemouth Casual Element
- Aldershot Town – A Company
- Arsenal – The Gooners, The Edecaws
- Aston Villa – Villa Youth, Steamers, Villa Hardcore, C-Crew
- Billericay Town – South Green Boot Boys, Billericay Bastards
- Birmingham City – Zulu Warriors
- Blackburn Rovers – Blackburn Youth, Darwen Mob, H Division, Mill Hill Mob
- Blackpool – The Muckers
- Bolton Wanderers – Cuckoo Boys, Boltons Service Youth
- Bradford City – The Ointment
- Brentford – Ealing Road Army, Brentford Youth Element
- Brighton & Hove Albion F.C. – West Street Firm
- Bristol City – City Service Firm, Family Stand Ointment
- Bristol Rovers – Gas Hit Squad
- Burnley – Suicide Squad
- Bury – Interchange Riot Squad
- Carlisle United – Border City Firm
- Crewe Alexandra – Bowman's Boys
- Charlton Athletic – Cockney Firestarters, B Mob Charlton Youth Casuals
- Chelsea – Headhunters
- Chester – 125's
- Coventry City – The Legion
- Crystal Palace – Dirty 30
- Derby County – Derby Lunatic Fringe
- Everton – County Road Cutters
- FC Halifax Town – Halifax Youth
- Goole Town F.C. / Goole A.F.C. – Gooligans
- Grimsby Town – Cleethorpes Beach Patrol, Grimsby Hit Squad
- Hartlepool United – Blue Order, North West Corner (NWC)
- Huddersfield Town – Huddersfield Young Casuals
- Hull City – Hull City Psychos
- Ipswich Town – Ipswich Punishment Squad, Blue Action
- Leeds United – Leeds United Service Crew
- Leicester City – Baby Squad
- Lincoln City – Lincoln Transit Elite
- Liverpool – The Urchins, R.R.S. Runcorn Riot Squad
- Luton Town – The MIGs, Lutonistan, Lutonlees Bury Park Boys
- Manchester City – Blazing Squad, Cool Cats, Guvnors, Mayne Line Service Crew
- Manchester United – The Red Army, Men In Black, Inter City Jibbers
- Mansfield Town – Mansfield Shady Express
- Middlesbrough – The Frontline
- Millwall – Bushwackers
- Newcastle United – Newcastle Gremlins, The New Batch
- Nottingham Forest – Forest Executive Crew
- Norwich City – Norwich Hit Squad, Under 5's
- Oldham Athletic – Fine Young Casuals
- Oxford United – South Midlands Hit Squad
- Peterborough United – Blue Division
- Plymouth Argyle – The Central Element
- Port Vale – Vale Lunatic Fringe
- Portsmouth – 6.57 Crew
- Preston North End – Preston Para Squad
- Queens Park Rangers – C-Mob, Bushbabies
- Reading FC – Reading Youth Firm
- Shrewsbury Town – English Border Front
- Sheffield United – Blades Business Crew
- Sheffield Wednesday – Owls Crime Squad (OCS), Is That It (ITI)
- Southampton – The Uglies, Inside Crew, Scum Army
- Southend United – CS Crew
- Stockport County – EVF (Edgeley Volunteer Force)
- Stoke City – Naughty Forty
- Sunderland – The Seaburn Casuals
- Swindon Town – The Aggro Boys; Swindon Active Service (SAS)
- Tottenham Hotspur – Yid Army, Tottenham Massive, Spurs N17
- Tranmere Rovers – TSB (Tranmere Stanley Boys)
- Watford – Watford Risk Squad
- West Bromwich Albion – Section Five
- West Ham United – Inter City Firm I.C.F
- Wolverhampton Wanderers – Subway Army (1979–1982), The Bridge Boys (1986–1988), Yam Yam Army (mid-2000s–present)
- York City – York Nomad Society (YNS)

== Finland ==
- HIFK – IFKs Yngre Grabbar
- HJK – Sakilaiset
- TPS
- Jokerit
- FC Lahti – Lahen Pojat

== France ==
- Paris Saint-Germain F.C. – Commando Pirate, Casual Firm, Indépendants
- Lille OSC – LOSC Army
- Olympique Lyonnais – Mezza Lyon

== Germany ==
- Borussia Dortmund – Frontline, Northside
- Hamburger SV – North Hooligans
- FC St. Pauli – Ultra Sankt Pauli, Skullbase
- Chemnitzer FC – HooNaRa
- Dynamo Dresden – Hooligans Elbflorenz, Faust des Ostens
- Eintracht Frankfurt – Adlerfront
- 1. FSV Mainz 05 – Mz-Army '84

== Greece ==
- PAOK - Gate 4
- Olympiacos - Gate 7
- Aris - Super3
- Panathinaikos - Gate 13
- AEK Athens - Original 21
- Asteras Tripolis - Tigers Ultras
- Lamia - Fadomades
- Panetolikos - Warriors
- OFI - Gate 4 Heraklion
- Panserraikos - Che Guevara Club
- Volos - Gate 2
- Levadiakos - Gate 1
- Atromitos - Fentagin
- AEL - Monsters
- Iraklis - Autonomous Gate 10
- Ilioupoli - Rebels 9
- Kalamata - Gate 5
- Niki Volos - Gate 3
- PAS Giannina - Gate 7
- Ergotelis - Daltons Club
- Olympiacos Volou - Austrian Boys

== Hungary ==
- Ferencvárosi TC – Kettes szektor (2nd Sector)

== Indonesia ==
- Arema F.C. – Curva Sud Arema
- Bali United F.C. – North Side Boys 12
- Persebaya Surabaya – Green Nord 27
- Persib Bandung – Northern Wall, Flowers City Casuals
- Persija Jakarta – Curva Sud Persija, Tiger Bois
- Persikabo 1973 – Ultras Persikabo Curva Sud
- Persis Solo – Surakartans 1923, Ultras 1923
- PSIS Semarang – Hooligans 1932
- PSS Sleman – Brigata Curva Sud
- Sriwijaya F.C. – Ultras Palembang

== Israel ==
- Beitar Jerusalem – La Familia

== Kosovo ==
- FC Drita – Intelektualët
- KF Gjilani – Skifterat

== Malaysia ==
- National Team – Malaysia Casual

Clubs

- Johor Darul Ta'zim F.C. – Inter Johor Firm
- Selangor F.C. – Left Side Elite
- Kedah Darul Aman F.C. – Grelow Bad Kasual
- Kelantan F.C. – Kelantan Casual
- Kuala Lumpur City F.C. – Kuala Lumpur Casual
- Negeri Sembilan F.C. – Blood Militia 427
- Perak F.C. – Inter City Firm
- Sabah F.C. – North Borneo Firm
- Sri Pahang F.C. – Darul Makmur Elite
- Terengganu F.C. – Coastal City Lads

== Montenegro ==
- FK Budućnost – Varvari
- FK Berane - Streetboys

== Netherlands ==
- ADO Den Haag – Midden Noord, North Side, Vak-G
- AFC Ajax – A.F.C.A, F-Side, AFCA Youth, AFCA 4th, North Up Alliance, South Crew VAK410
- AZ – Ben-Side, Red White Fanatics/Alkmaar Fanatics
- De Graafschap – Brigata Tifosi, Spinnenkop
- PEC Zwolle – S-Side, Vandas noord, Zwolle Joet
- FC Dordrecht – Island defenders, Dikeside
- FC Groningen – Groningen Fanatics, Z-Side
- FC Twente – Vak-P
- FC Utrecht – Bunnikside, UHF
- Feyenoord – U.D.F, DeF, SCF, FIIIR, Vak-S
- Helmond Sport – AA-Side, NFH Hsh/Hyc
- MVV Maastricht – Angel-Side, Ultras Mestreech
- NAC Breda – B-Side, F7 Ultras, Vak-G
- NEC – HKN, Eastside
- PSV – L-Side, Lighttown Madness, Oostfront
- SC Cambuur – M.I.-Side
- SC Heerenveen – Nieuw Noord
- Sparta Rotterdam – Spangenaren, Tifosi del Castello
- Vitesse – Rijnfront, Vak126
- Willem II – Kingside, Tilburg Tifosi

== Norway ==
- Aalesunds FK / SPK Rollon – Blue Army Aalesund / Blue Army Rollon
- Fredrikstad FK – Brigade Rød Hvit (BRH) CCTV Firm, Red Beavers.
- Ham-Kam – Briskebys Beste Borgere (BBB)
- I.K. Start – Christianssands Herreekvipasje (CHE)
- Lillestrøm SK – Sportsklubbens fineste (SKF)
- S.K. Brann – Bergen Casuals (TGB)
- Viking FK – Stavanger Yngre (SYC)
- Vålerenga I.F. Fotball – Isko Boys, Enga Casuals, Enga Yngre

== Poland ==
- Arka Gdynia – Młoda Arka
- Cracovia – Jude Gang
- Górnik Zabrze – Torcida
- Korona Kielce – YBH'01 (Young Boys Hooligans)
- Lech Poznań – Brygada Banici, Young Freaks '98
- Lechia Gdańsk – Młode Orły
- Legia Warsaw – Teddy Boys'95, Turyści'97
- Pogoń Szczecin – Terror Corps
- Ruch Chorzów – Psycho Fans
- Stal Stalowa Wola – Stalówka 'BZC'
- Śląsk Wrocław – silesia
- Widzew Łódź – Destroyers
- Wisła Kraków – Sharks
- Zagłębie Sosnowiec – Barra Bravas'97

== Portugal ==
- Boavista Futebol Clube – Panteras Negras – Ultras 84
- Futebol Clube do Porto – Super Dragões Colectivo 95
- Sport Lisboa e Benfica – Diabos Vermelhos, No Name Boys
- Sporting Clube de Braga – Ultras Red Boys
- Sporting Clube de Portugal – Directivo Ultras XXI, Juventude Leonina, Sporting Casuals, Torcida Verde
- Vitória Sport Clube – White Angels

== Russia ==
- CSKA Moscow – Gallant Steeds, Yaroslavka
- Spartak Moscow – Gladiators Firm '96, Fratria
- Zenit Saint Petersburg – Music Hall

== Scotland ==
- Aberdeen – Aberdeen Soccer Casuals, Under 5s
- Airdrie – Section B, Red Army Firm
- Alloa – Alloa Defense Unit
- Arbroath – Arbroath Soccer Crew, Arbroath Soccer Society
- Ayr – Ayr Service Crew
- Bonyrigg Rose -Bonyrigg Bashers
- Celtic – Celtic Soccer Crew, Roman Catholic Casuals, Style Mile Vandals
- Dundee – Dundee Soccer Crew, Hilltown Huns
- Dundee United – Tannadice Trendies, The Shimmy
- Dundee & Dundee United – The Utility, Alliance Under Fives
- Dunfermline – Carnegie Soccer Service
- Falkirk – Falkirk Fear, Falkirk yoof
- Greenock Morton – Morton Soccer Crew, Morton Youth
- Heart of Midlothian – Casual Soccer Firm, Gorgie Boot Boys, Gorgie Aggro, Shed Boys, Hearts Service Crew.
- Hibernian – Capital City Service, Blackleys Baby Crew, The Family, Hibs Baby Crew, Inter City Fleet
- Inverness Caledonian Thistle – North Stand Boys.
- Kilmarnock – Paninaro
- Meadowbank Thistle – Thistle Soccer Boys
- Montrose – Portland Bill Seaside Squad, Montrose Soccer Unit
- Motherwell – Saturday Service, Tufty Club, Soccer Shorties, Nu-Kru
- Partick Thistle – North Glasgow Express
- Queen of the South – Casuals Internal Division
- Queen's Park - Section 67
- Raith Rovers – Kirkcaldy Soccer Casuals, Kirkcaldy Baby Crew
- Rangers – Inter City Firm, Her Majesty's Service, Rangers Soccer Babes, Section Red
- St Johnstone – Fair City Firm, Mainline Baby Squad, Perth Pack, BenJDavo Renegades
- St Mirren – Love Street Division
- Scotland FC – Scottish National Firm

== Serbia ==
- FK Partizan – Grobari, Principi, Anti Romi, Shadows, Vandal Boys, Commando, 40+, Još Neko Kopa, Vračar
- Crvena zvezda – Delije, Belgrade Boys, Heroes, Mangupi, Brigate, Ultra Boys 1993, Hyaenas, Armija 5, Kopre Nedri
- Vojvodina Novi Sad – Firma, Old Town Boys, Pandora, Bulevar, Sanatorijum, Sremski Front
- FK Novi Pazar – Ekstremi, Torcida Sandžak
- Radnicki 1923 - Crveni Đavoli
- FK Zemun – Taurunum Boys
- Spartak Subotica – Marinci
- Radnički Niš – Meraklije
- OFK Belgrade – Plava Unija
- FK Rad – United Force, Rangers, Odred-18
- FK Voždovac - Invalidi

== Slovakia ==
- FK Dukla Banská Bystrica – Red White Angeles
- FK DAC 1904 Dunajská Streda – Felvidéki Harcosok (Hungarian: "Upland warriors")
- MFK Košice – Rebels VSS, Psycho Boys
- FC Nitra – Bulldogs '95
- ŠK Slovan Bratislava – Ultras Slovan Pressburg
- FC Spartak Trnava – Red Black Warriors
- 1. FC Tatran Prešov – Village Brigade
- AS Trenčín – Trenchtown Gangsters
- MŠK Žilina – Yellow Green Fanatics, Terror Boys

== Spain ==
- Athletic Club – Herri Norte Taldea
- Atlético Madrid – Frente Atlético, Suburbios Firm
- Barcelona – Boixos Nois
- Cadiz – Brigadas Amarillas
- Celta Vigo – Celtarras
- Deportivo Alavés – Iraultza 1923
- Deportivo La Coruña – Riazor Blues
- Malaga – Frente Bokerón, Malaka Hinchas
- Osasuna – Indar Gorri
- Rayo Vallecano – Bukaneros
- Real Betis – Supporters Gol Sur
- Real Madrid – Ultras Sur
- Real Oviedo – Symmachiarii
- Real Sociedad – Peña Mujika
- Real Zaragoza – Ligallo Fondo Norte, Avispero
- Sevilla – Biris Norte
- Sporting Gijón – Ultra Boys
- Valencia – Ultras Yomus, Curva Nord

== Sweden ==
- AIK – Firman Boys, Young Boys,
- BS BolticGöta/Degerfors IF/Färjestads BK – Värmlandsalliansen
- Djurgårdens IF – Djurgårdens Fina Grabbar (DFG), Djurgårdens Yngre Grabbar, Djurgårdens Mindre Grabbar
- GAIS – Gärningsmännen, GAIS Yngre, GAIS Babys
- IFK Göteborg – Wisemen, Gothenburg Youth Division, Youth crew Gothenburg, Gothenburg United
- Kalmar FF – Kalmarfamiljen
- Hammarby IF – Kompisgänget Bajen (KGB), Sudra Divizione MMXI, Bajen Baby Squad, Bajen Yngsta, Bajen Orphans
- Helsingborgs IF – Frontline
- Linköpings HC – Cluben Casuals
- Malmö FF – True Rockers
- Örgryte IS – Red fans klan

== Turkey ==
- Fenerbahce – KFY (Kill For You) Bogaz Hooligans

== Ukraine ==
- FC Arsenal Kyiv – Hoods Hoods Klan
- Dynamo Kyiv – WBC (White Boys Club), Rodychi, Kyiv City Supporters, Albatros, Young Hope
- Shakhtar Donetsk – Za Boys Ultras
- FC Dnipro – Ultras'83
- Karpaty Lviv – Banderstadt Ultras, Green White Ultras
- Metalist Kharkiv – United Kharkiv, Pivdenna hrupa
- Zorya Luhansk – Black-White Ultras
- Vorskla Poltava – Crew Of Golden Eagle
- Metalurh Zaporizhzhia – Beshketnyky
- Volyn Lutsk – Volyn Crusaders Firm
- Chornomorets Odesa – SouthFront
- Nyva Ternopil – Terno Field Army
- FC Oleksandriya – PFCO Supporters
- Dnipro Cherkasy – Cherkasy Ultras

== Wales ==
- Cardiff City – Soul Crew
- Swansea City – Jack Army, Swansea Riot Squad
- Wrexham – Wrexham Frontline

== See also ==
- Football hooliganism
- Hooliganism
- Casual (subculture)
- Association football culture
- Racism in association football
- Skinhead
- Yobbo
