= The Real Football Factories =

- Genre: Documentary
- Created by: Peter Day
- Starring: Danny Dyer
- Country of origin: United Kingdom
- Original language: English
- No. of episodes: 6

Production
- Running time: 60 minutes (inc commercials)

Original release
- Network: Bravo, Bravo +1
- Release: 6 May – 15 June 2006

Related
- The Real Football Factories International

The Real Football Factories is a documentary series shown on the Bravo television channel in the United Kingdom and created by Zig Zag Productions. The show looks at the in-depth life of football hooligans and hooligan firms. Interviews are conducted with past and present hooligans.

The presenter of the show, Danny Dyer, also starred in the film The Football Factory. During the series Dyer visits Yorkshire, Scotland, The Midlands, North West England and London to meet up with and interview hooligans.

On 25 May 2007 Bravo broadcast a new show, The Real Football Factories International, which looks at football firms worldwide.

In September 2007 Virgin Media released a spoof version of the show starring comedian Terry Alderton as Danny Dire.

== Episode guide ==
- "London"
- "North West"
- "Yorkshire"
- "The Midlands"
- "Scotland"
- "England Away"

== Episode 1: London ==
The series begins by briefly outlining the history of football hooliganism from the rise of skinhead culture in London during the 1960s and 70s through the casual movement in the late 1970s and 80s. The episode then turns to the firms of four major clubs in London: Millwall, West Ham United, Chelsea, and Tottenham Hotspur.

Dyer meets with Ginger Bob, a member of Millwall's F-Troop, one of the first firms chronicled by the media. Ginger Bob describes how F-Troop was willing to charge an entire terrace of opposition fans with as few as 10 or 20 boys. During one incident in 2002, 900 Millwall supporters went on a rampage after losing to Birmingham City. Over 100 police officers were injured. In another incident following an FA Cup match at Luton, over 700 seats were torn from the stands and thrown onto the pitch. Tommy Robinson of Luton's Mig Crew comments on taking on not only members of Millwall, but the firms of other London clubs as well including Arsenals Gooners.

The episode also covers Millwall's long-time rivals, West Ham United. Dyer, a West Ham fan himself, meets with Cass Pennant, former top boy of West Ham's infamous Inter City Firm (the ICF). The firm takes its name from the InterCity trains utilised by the firm to travel to away games. Pennant describes the ICF's introduction of calling cards which would be served upon members of opposing firms. The episode also discusses the Cockney Rejects, which the ICF followed during its tours around England. Two of the band's members, Mick Geggus and Jeff Turner, described how during one show in Birmingham, it kicked off between the band and opposing fans.

Moving on to Chelsea, Dyer meets with Jason Marriner, a former "respected lad" with the Chelsea Headhunters. Marriner was sentenced to six years for football-related offences. Following his sentence, he became something of a celebrity among many of Chelsea's fans, signing autographs and holding audiences with where he discussed his days with the firm.

At Tottenham, Dyer met with Trevor Tanner, a member of the Spurs' "Yid Army". Tanner describes how "Yid" was (and continues to be) used as a derogatory term by opposition fans, referencing the Tottenham area's historical roots as a Jewish community. Over time, however, the firm adopted the term as its own. Tanner also describes how he was imprisoned for three years following a violent confrontation with the firm's bitter rival, the Chelsea Headhunters, outside of a pub. The episode concludes by describing how the police have utilised CCTV, close surveillance during match days and football banning orders to crack down on football violence.

== Episode 2: North West ==
In this episode Dyer travels to the Northwest of England to confront members of firms with relations to Manchester United and their main rivals Manchester City, Liverpool and Everton.

== Episode 4: The Midlands ==
In this episode, Dyer visits the following firms:

- Birmingham Zulu Warriors (Birmingham FC)
- Naughty Forty (Stoke City F.C.)
- Yam Yam Army (Wolverhampton Wanderers F.C.)
- Forest Executive Crew (Nottingham Forest F.C.)
- Derby Lunatic Fringe (Derby County F.C.)
- Leicester Baby Squad (Leicester City F.C.)
