= Leeds United Service Crew =

Football hooligan firm linked to Leeds United F.C.

- An LUSC badge featuring the British Rail Double Arrow
- Named after: Leeds United
- Founding location: Leeds, Yorkshire
- Years active: 1974–present
- Territory: Parts of North Yorkshire, West Yorkshire and South Yorkshire (formerly the West Riding of Yorkshire)
- Membership: 1500–2000
- Criminal activities: Football hooliganism; riots; fighting
- Allies: LUSC; Yorkshire's Republican Army
- Rivals: Red Army; Millwall Bushwackers; Hull City Psychos; Cardiff City Soul Crew; Chelsea Headhunters; Birmingham Zulu Warriors

The Leeds United Service Crew are a football hooligan firm linked to the English Premier League team, Leeds United F.C. The Service Crew were formed in 1974 and are named after the ordinary public service trains that the hooligans would travel on to away matches, rather than the heavily policed, organised football special trains. The Service Crew are one of the most notorious hooligan firms in the history of English football.

In 1985, when football hooliganism was rife in England, the BBC Six O'Clock News had a special report in which they listed the worst football hooligan gangs creating mayhem across England and Leeds United were listed amongst the worst five clubs.

== History ==
The club distances itself from any activities the Service Crew are involved in. During the height of the hooliganism, the Service Crew became one of the most notorious firms in European football, and in doing so nearly brought the club to its knees.

The first high-profile incident that Leeds hooligans were involved in came on 28 May 1975 at the European Cup final against Bayern Munich at the Parc des Princes in Paris, France. When striker Peter Lorimer had a goal disallowed in a game which ended in a 2–0 defeat to the West German side, and having already seen their team have two penalty appeals rejected by French referee Michel Kitabdjian, scores of Leeds fans ripped seats from the stands and threw them onto the pitch. Some of them clashed with the French police as they invaded the pitch. As a result of this incident, Leeds were banned from European competitions for four years – although this was later reduced to two years on appeal. Leeds were the first English football club to be banned from a European competition.

In the 1982–83 season, in the club's first game (at Grimsby on 28 August) in the Second Division after relegation, some Leeds fans went on what was described in The Sun newspaper as "an orgy of drinking, looting and fighting" in Cleethorpes, where 600 Leeds fans had stayed the night before the match. In October, two Newcastle United players were hit by missiles at Elland Road and the FA ordered another inquiry.

On 11 May 1985 (the same day as the Bradford City stadium fire), a 14-year-old Leeds fan (Ian Hambridge) attending his first ever game died at St Andrew's stadium when fans were pushed by police onto a wall which subsequently collapsed following crowd violence at a match between Birmingham City and Leeds United. Fans started fighting when Birmingham took the lead, and riot police were called in to stop Leeds fans pulling down fencing. It was estimated that more than 1,000 fans became involved in the ensuing riot, which saw seats and advertising hoardings being torn up and used as missiles, 96 policemen being injured and the collapsing wall also crushing several parked motor vehicles beyond repair. The Popplewell Committee was set up to investigate both the fire at Bradford City's Valley Parade (which was not hooliganism-related) and the riot at the Birmingham City versus Leeds United match, but the higher number of fatalities in the former case meant that it received much more attention. The fighting between Birmingham City and Leeds United fans was described by Justice Popplewell as more like "the Battle of Agincourt than a football match", and is considered to be one of the worst incidents in an era notorious for hooliganism.

By January 1987, the club's reputation for hooliganism was so bad that when they were drawn with non-league Telford United in an FA Cup third round tie, the Shropshire club refused to host the game at their Bucks Head ground; it was instead played some 30 miles away at the stadium of West Bromwich Albion.

On 5 May 1990, Leeds travelled to AFC Bournemouth for the final game of the 1989–90 Second Division season. Victory in the game would give them the Second Division title and promotion back to the top flight after eight years away. Leeds achieved this with a 1–0 win, but the success was marred by a string of vandalism on town centre pubs and shops as well as a series of battles between hooligans and police officers. 104 people were arrested and 12 police officers were injured.

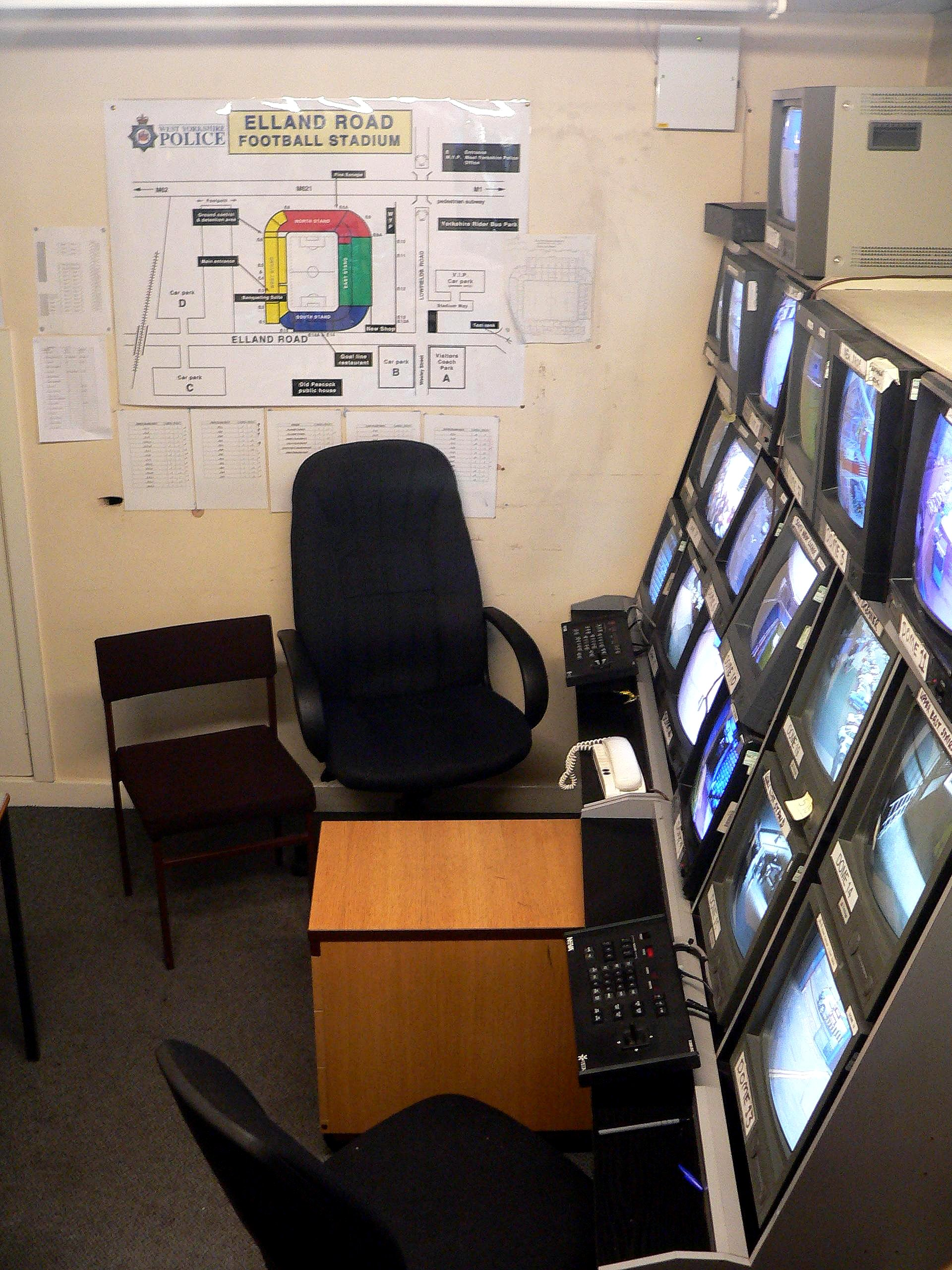
The police control station at Elland Road, used to monitor fans

Modern day crackdowns on football hooliganism and the heavy use of CCTV at grounds have, as with other firms, largely curtailed the activities of the Service Crew. While hooliganism continues at Leeds United, the nature of it has changed since the 1970s and 1980s. Improvements to security in Elland Road as with all grounds in England have led to confrontations more usually taking place away from stadiums.

On 28 April 2007, during the Championship game at Elland Road with Ipswich Town, about 200 home fans spilled onto the pitch and forced a 30-minute delay after a late Ipswich equaliser all but sealed Leeds' relegation to League One. Around 100 of them ran toward the South East stand where the away supporters were located. In January 2008 thirteen Leeds United fans were handed football banning orders totalling 45 years after they pleaded guilty to affray in connection with the pitch invasion.

On 19 October 2012, Leeds United played Sheffield Wednesday at Hillsborough. One Leeds fan entered the pitch after Michael Tonge’s equaliser and assaulted Wednesdays’ keeper Chris Kirkland. The perpetrator was subsequently sent to prison for four months and handed a life ban from attending future matches in England.
