= Taurunum Boys =

Taurunum Boys 1987
- Таурунуми
- Abbreviation: TB87 / ТБ87
- Nickname: The Zemuns (Zemunci)
- Named after: Latin name for Zemun
- Formation: 1987; 39 years ago
- Founded at: Zemun, Belgrade, Serbia
- Legal status: Active
- Purpose: Ultras, fans of FK Zemun
- Region served: mainly Zemun
- Members: Unknown, possibly around 20-100

Taurunum Boys, full name Taurunum Boys 1987 or simply Taurunumi (lit. transl in Latin: people from Zemun) is the collective name for ultras and supporters of FK Zemun. The Zemun fans united in 1987, and the Latin name for Zemun, Taurunum, was used as the group's name and trademark.

Zemun fans gathered around FK Zemun and organized their first joint cheering for the club in 1986, when the football club was called Galenika. They are located in the northern stand of the City Stadium in Zemun. The motto of this fan group is "One city, one club, only Zemun". Immediately after their foundation, they received a fan section from Pančevo called Rangers, and there are supporters throughout Belgrade and Serbia as a whole. The fraternal and friendly group of Taurunums since 1998 is the Crveni Đavoli (Engl. Red Devils), an organized supporters group of FK Radnički 1923 from Kragujevac. They also have friendly relations with the fans of FC Iraklis from Thessaloniki, whose group is called Autonomo. Also, in addition to FK Zemun, Taurunums organizes their trips to Serbian national football team matches too.

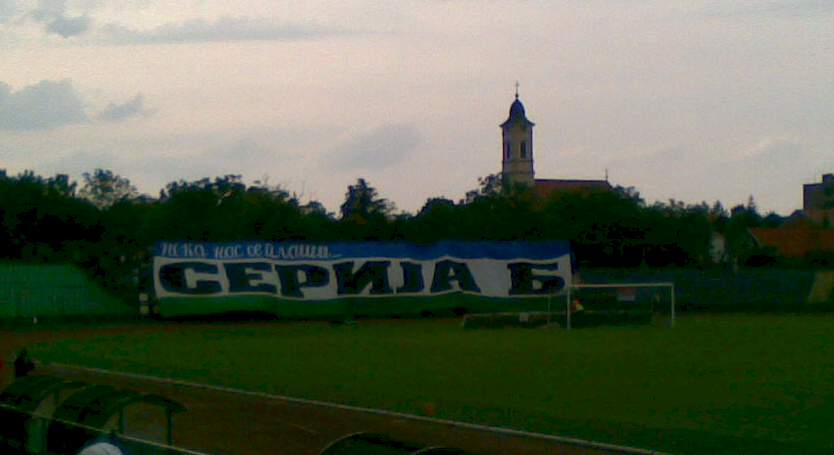
A picture of Taurnum Boys during a match.

== History ==
The history of Zemun fans can be divided into four phases, the first covering the period in the 1970s when people began to come to the matches in an organized manner by trucks and buses to cheer on FK Zemun. The second phase covers the mid-1980s, when banners were first seen in the stands of these fans. The first groups gathered around FK Zemun were Testas Caldas, Pajtosi and the Godfathers, and they later merged into the group Taurunum, in 1987. After the outbreak of a war in the SFRY, the group fell into crisis and matches were played less frequently, and although some of the fans went to the battlefield, the organization was at a high level. The third phase of the development of the Taurunum group covers 1995, when the two subgroups split, which were the prerequisites for today's groups Boys 1995 and Dragons 1995. They were young groups that had been developing for the previous sixteen years and which today represent the old city of northern Zemun. The fourth phase of the group's development began in the mid-2000s, when the group expanded as a result of the good work of the Boys 1995 and Dragons 1995 groups. At that time, the group from Zemun trg was formed, which at that time consisted of young people who gathered around Nova Garda. All of them together represent the fans of Taurunum Boys 1987, and the aforementioned subgroups have their own flags and come from parts of Zemun such as Ćukovac, Nova Galenika, Novi Grad and Zemun Polje.

=== Current status ===
Group is active on both away and home matches of its beloved club, FK Zemun, that is now competing in Serbian First League, a second-tier of Serbian football league system. It is one of the most organized in Serbia, beside Grobari, Delije, Crveni Đavoli and many others.

== See also ==
- Ultras groups in Serbia
- Crveni Đavoli
