= Millwall F.C. in European football =

English club in European football

- Club: Millwall
- Seasons played: 1
- First entry: 2004–05 UEFA Cup
- Latest entry: 2004–05 UEFA Cup

Millwall Football Club is an English association football club based in South Bermondsey, London. They were founded in 1885 and first joined The Football League in 1920. Their first and only season playing in a major European cup competition was in 2004 when they qualified for the 2004–05 UEFA Cup. They had also played in the Anglo-Italian Cup

== 1992–93 Anglo-Italian Cup ==
Millwall were entered into the Anglo-Italian Cup for the first time in 1992. In their group they were drawn with Charlton Athletic and Portsmouth. However they failed to progress as they finished bottom of the group with a 2–1 loss to Charlton at The Old Den and a 1–1 draw with Portsmouth at Fratton Park.

== 1993–94 Anglo-Italian Cup ==
Millwall entered the Anglo-Italian Cup again in 1993. They were drawn with Charlton and Crystal Palace. However they again finished bottom of the group with a 3–0 loss to Crystal Palace at Selhurst Park and a 2–2 draw with Charlton at The Den.

== 2004–05 UEFA Cup ==
Millwall qualified for their first UEFA competition by reaching the final of the 2003–04 FA Cup. As their opponents Manchester United had already qualified for the UEFA Champions League by virtue of their placing in the 2003–04 Premier League, it was guaranteed that Millwall would play in the UEFA Cup, regardless of whether they won or lost the FA Cup final (in the event, they lost 3–0). In the first round they were drawn against Hungarian side Ferencvárosi TC. Millwall drew the first leg 1–1 at home at The New Den with Dennis Wise scoring Millwall's first European goal. Prior to the second leg, there was violence between the clubs' supporters; supporters of Millwall and Ferencváros both have reputations for football hooliganism. Two Millwall fans were stabbed in the hooligan violence. Millwall brought 3,000 fans to Budapest for the return leg, which the club lost 3–1 at Stadion Albert Flórián, going out 4–2 on aggregate. Ferencváros were later charged by UEFA for the violence and racist abuse during the second leg. There were reports that Millwall hooligans would be travelling to Edinburgh when Ferencváros were due to play Heart of Midlothian in later rounds; however, Millwall sent a security expert, who stated it was unlikely to happen due to the risk of arrest and spending Christmas in a Scottish prison.

Season	Competition	Round	Opposition	Score
2004–05	UEFA Cup	First round	(Hungary) Ferencváros	1–1 (H), 3–1 (A)

== Aftermath ==
Since then, Millwall have played in leagues below the Premier League. In 2013, the club reached the semi-finals of the 2012–13 FA Cup. As the other finalist Manchester City had already qualified for Europe, the winner of the semi-final would have entered the 2013–14 UEFA Europa League. However, Millwall lost 2–0 to Wigan Athletic at Wembley Stadium and changes to UEFA qualifying criteria later meant that runners-up of the FA Cup would no longer enter the UEFA Europa League if the winners had already qualified for Europe.
