= LUSC =

The acronym LUSC might refer to:

- Leeds United Service Crew, an English football hooliganism firm
- Squamous-cell carcinoma of the lung, a type of cancer
