= Aston Villa Hardcore =

Aston Villa Hardcore (Villa Hardcore)
- Founded by: Steven Fowler
- Founding location: Birmingham, England
- Years active: 1993–present
- Territory: Birmingham, England
- Membership (est.): 250-500
- Criminal activities: Football hooliganism riots street fighting

Aston Villa Hardcore (often shortened to Villa Hardcore or known as Villa Youth when referring to the younger element of the group) is a football hooligan firm associated with the Premier League club Aston Villa, based in Birmingham, England.

== Background ==
The firm have been active since circa 1993, following on from previous Aston Villa hooligan firms the Steamers, C-Crew and Villa Youth. The name 'Hardcore' reportedly arising from a Metropolitan Police officer announcing on his radio: "Here come Villa's hardcore" following the firm's emergence from a train station before an away match against West Ham United in November 1996. The Hardcore have clashed a number of times with the Zulu Warriors, associated with Aston Villa's fiercest rivals Birmingham City.

== Incidents involving Aston Villa Hardcore ==
Fifteen people were arrested in October 2002 in a series of dawn raids in connection with serious disorders committed in the Rocky Lane area of Aston before the game between Aston Villa and Birmingham City in September 2002, in what was described as the "Battle of Rocky Lane". In 2004, Steven Fowler, a Category C hooligan and member of Villa Hardcore, was jailed for six months for his part in the fight in 2002. In 2005 he received a twelve-month jail sentence and was banned from attending football matches for ten years, for his part in an organised brawl between the Villa Hardcore and Chelsea Headhunters at King's Cross in London on 27 March 2004, while five other Villa fans were also jailed. Fowler was jailed again in 2006 when he and 57 other people were found guilty of involvement in a riot at a Handsworth pub on 22 August 2004 - the same day as Villa's Premier League clash with local rivals West Bromwich Albion.

A younger wing of the firm emerged under the banner "Hardcore Youth" with two members of the firm being banned in January 2010 from attending Aston Villa matches, being in the vicinity of Villa Park on match-days, and, when Villa are playing away from home, using trains to travel the country and from entering the relevant town-centre. The pair were branded as "ring-leaders" by police and also were made to pay a fine of £500 each in court. Later on in the year another known Villa youth hooligan was handed a 3-year banning order at Warwick Crown Court whilst being held on remand after serving a 12-month prison sentence. He was handed the banning order after troubled flared outside Birmingham City's ground in 2009 after Villa won the game 1–2 with Gabriel Agbonlahor scoring a late winner. Police statistics claim that after the three leaders of the Youth faction of the Hardcore were all banned, reports of violence and potential organised clashes fell by 75%.

In October and December 2010, Aston Villa played Birmingham City, at Villa Park (Premier League, 31 October) and St Andrew's (League Cup, 1 December) and in both games violence between the two sets of supporters and hooligan firms occurred, with many fans being arrested. In the first game, there were scenes of violence outside Villa Park, with Villa fans throwing a flare into Birmingham fans leaving the stadium. There was a small number of arrests including a Birmingham City club chef. In the second of the games, after Birmingham had beaten Villa 2–1, Birmingham supporters invaded the pitch and confronted the visiting Villa fans. In retaliation, Villa fans ripped out seats and hurled them into the Birmingham supporters. A flare was thrown from the Villa fans section into the Birmingham fans on the pitch. Villa fans were convicted for offences relating to an attack on a pub near St. Andrews after the match, frequented by Birmingham City supporters after being identified on CCTV.

On 14 January 2017, around 35 members of the Hardcore were issued with dispersal orders at The Angel Inn in Bilston, where around 55 had gathered before a 5:30pm EFL Championship match against Wolverhampton Wanderers at Molineux. The Angel Inn was ordered to stop serving drinks and nearby pubs told to lock their doors amid fears of violent disorder. The Midland Metro service was briefly disrupted as a tram was handed over to police for the purpose of transporting the fans out of the city. About 30 police officers, some with dogs, took part in the operation between 3pm and 5pm. In a statement, West Midlands Police said: “To be really clear, these were a group of people we strongly believed were together to cause trouble.” Villa lost the match 1–0, and Villa fans were criticised after destroying toilets in the away section of the stadium.

On 12 August 2017, after Aston Villa's Championship match against Cardiff City F.C. at the Cardiff City Stadium, around 30 Villa Hardcore members attacked The Cornwall public house in the Grangetown area of the city where Cardiff supporters had gathered following the final whistle. In November 2017, South Wales Police released a statement saying 14 individuals had been arrested in connection with the incident and posted images of six more men they wished to speak to. On 10 December 2018, ten Villa fans received prison sentences varying between nine months and three years for their part in the pub brawl; three Cardiff supporters were also jailed.

On 8 April 2025, the day before Villa's UEFA Champions League quarter final match against Paris Saint-Germain at the Parc des Princes, members of the Hardcore took part in a street fight with PSG's Kop of Boulogne (KoB) hooligan firm outside a bar in the Pigalle district of Paris. Video footage captured by eye-witnesses at the scene which was later posted online captured "a chaotic scene with punches, glasses, and chairs being hurled".

== In popular culture ==
In November 2006, a planned launch of the book Villains about the various Aston Villa hooligan firms, which included details of clashes with the Zulu Warriors, which was due to be held at Sensations Club in the Balsall Heath area of Birmingham, had to be cancelled due to threats that the Zulus would turn up and cause trouble at the event. Members of the Zulu Warriors were said to have taken exception to the launch of the book and the presence of rivals on what they considered "their territory".

In October 2008, Fowler, along with Michael Lutwyche released a book entitled Hardcore about the firm.

On Sunday, 10 April 2011, an episode of Police Academy UK, a TV show aired on BBC Three, which documents four overseas police officers introduction to British crime and policing, was set in Birmingham and covered the violence that occurred at the game between Birmingham City and Aston Villa on 1 December 2010.

In April 2011, a DVD was released with the title Aston Villa Hardcore Lads; the 70-minute-long DVD shows footage of the Hardcore involved in violence with rival hooligan firms, for example fans of Oxford United, West Bromwich Albion and various clashes with fans of Birmingham City. The DVD also includes pictures of Aston Villa hooligans and sections where Villa's rivals are ridiculed.

In February 2014, an episode of the BBC series Inside Out followed officers from West Midlands Police as they attempted to combat football hooliganism at a West Bromwich Albion v Villa game in November 2013.
