= Section 5 (hooligan firm) =

- Founded by: West Bromwich Albion Fans
- Founding location: West Bromwich
- Years active: Late 1970s–
- Territory: Black Country area, Birmingham area
- Ethnicity: Mixed Races (White, Black, brown British)
- Membership (est.): 70-120
- Criminal activities: Football hooliganism, riots, fighting, breach of the peace, armed fighting
- Allies: VVV-Venlo
- Rivals: Subway Army; Wolverhampton Wanderers; Zulus; Birmingham City; Villa Hardcore; Aston Villa; Naughty Forty; Stoke City

Section 5 (or known as Albion Youth when referring to the younger element of their firm) are a football hooligan firm associated with Championship football club West Bromwich Albion F.C. Whilst Albion have had several other firms since the 1960s, including Clubhouse and the Smethwick Mob, Section 5 is the largest, with activity peaking in the 1980s and 1990s.

It was a progenitor of hooligan firms of mixed racial heritage during a time of ethnic homogeneity and racist attitudes, both of which were prevalent among firms and some football fans in general during the heyday of hooliganism.

== Background ==
Section 5 are known for their involvement in violent clashes with supporters of rival teams, especially with local clubs Wolverhampton Wanderers, Birmingham City and Aston Villa.

In 2002, West Bromwich Albion and Wolverhampton Wanderers supporters met up in Amsterdam ahead of the England vs. the Netherlands game. Over 50 men fought in the town centre, a conflict that was captured on CCTV. Footage showed a number of Wolves fans throwing bottles into a pub and waiting outside. West Bromwich Albion then ran out of the pub and attacked the Wolves hooligans.

The infamous Battle of Bramall Lane match between Sheffield United and WBA saw violence off the pitch as well as on it. Trouble broke out in the ground after the match was abandoned when Sheffield United were left with just six players on the pitch. There was also fighting outside the ground in a match marred by fighting between opposing players on the pitch.

Also in 2004, West Bromwich Albion's Section 5 met up with Cardiff City's Soul Crew in a massive brawl in Cardiff. As Section 5 was getting an escort to the ground, several men broke through the police line and charged at the Soul Crew.

On 22 August 2004, up to 80 West Brom and Aston Villa fans fought a pitched battle, with some using baseball bats, wooden posts, bricks, glasses and iron bars, at the Uplands pub, in Handsworth after a game against Aston Villa. Eight people were injured. The organised fight led to the conviction of 60 hooligans (23 from West Brom and 37 from Aston Villa) at Birmingham Crown Court on 5 December 2006. 58 received football banning orders with prison sentences of up to 21 months.

During the 2011 Black Country Derby Premier League match between West Bromwich Albion and Wolverhampton Wanderers, trouble started when a smoke bomb was thrown from the visiting fans' section into a volatile section of home crowd. The Albion supporters responded by hurling objects back at the Wolves fans, one of whom was pictured with blood streaming from his head. Following Albion's 1–1 draw with Wolves, 7 people were jailed after fans of the two clubs clashed at a pub in Great Bridge.

In 2012 a 40-strong group of West Bromwich Albion fans fought with an opposing group of 40 hooligans linked to Queens Park Rangers at a pub near The Hawthorns, involving weapons and bottles being thrown. Nine people were charged with violent disorder.

On 25 November 2013, fans were arrested after clashes with rival fans of Aston Villa at a Tavern in the Jewellery Quarter area of Birmingham before the two sides met in the Premier League at The Hawthorns, which was later the subject of an episode of the BBC series Inside Out.

Around 30 fans of West Brom, Aston Villa and Wolves engaged in a huge brawl at Birmingham New Street station on a train departing for Worcester Foregate Street in September 2015. The flare-up saw suspects using belts as weapons.

In 2016 West Brom fans and Birmingham City fans clashed at a gig in the O2 Academy in Birmingham.

== Name ==
One explanation for the name is 'Section 5' is derived from the old Birmingham Road End terracing of The Hawthorns where a number of associated fans used to stand. The terracing was split into sections, with the number of each area situated overhead. Section 5 was in the middle at the rear of the stand and was where chanting often originated from, which then spread across the ground. This was where many if not most of the firm stood with a smaller amount congregated in the Smethwick End. Active members of Section Five not banned from attending football matches are today primarily located in the Smethwick End stand.

An alternative derivative of the name 'Section 5' may originate from a section of law (possibly the Public Order Act) aimed at football hooliganism and violent behaviour.

== Literature ==
A book titled Sons of Albion: The Inside Story of the Section 5 Squad Incorporating the Clubhouse and Smethwick Mob 30+ Years of West Brom's Hooligan Firms, was published in 2009. Written by former Section 5 members, it documents the firms evolution and activities, as well as the authors' experiences as hooligans.
