= Čika Dača Stadium =

Stadium in Kragujevac, Serbia

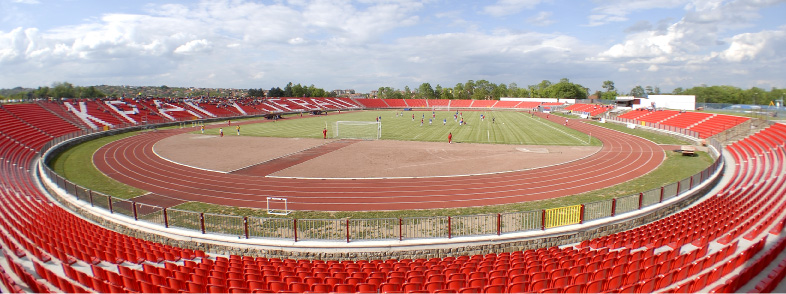
- Interactive map of Čika Dača Stadium
- Full name: Čika Dača Stadium
- Location: Kragujevac, Serbia
- Coordinates: 44°01′15.14″N 20°53′57.10″E
- Owner: City of Kragujevac
- Operator: FK Radnički 1923, AK " Radnički", Kragujevac Wild Boars
- Capacity: 15,100
- Surface: Grass
- Scoreboard: Yes

Construction
- Groundbreaking: November 1949
- Built: 1949–1957
- Opened: 6 June 1957
- Renovated: 2007, 2024

Tenant
- FK Radnički 1923 (1957–present)

Čika Dača Stadium (Serbian: Стадион Чика Дача) is a multi-use stadium in Kragujevac, Serbia. It is currently used mostly for football matches and is the home ground of FK Radnički 1923 and Kragujevac Wild Boars. The stadium was named in memory of Danilo Badnjar, known as Čika Dača, who is considered to be a pioneer of football in Serbia.

== History ==
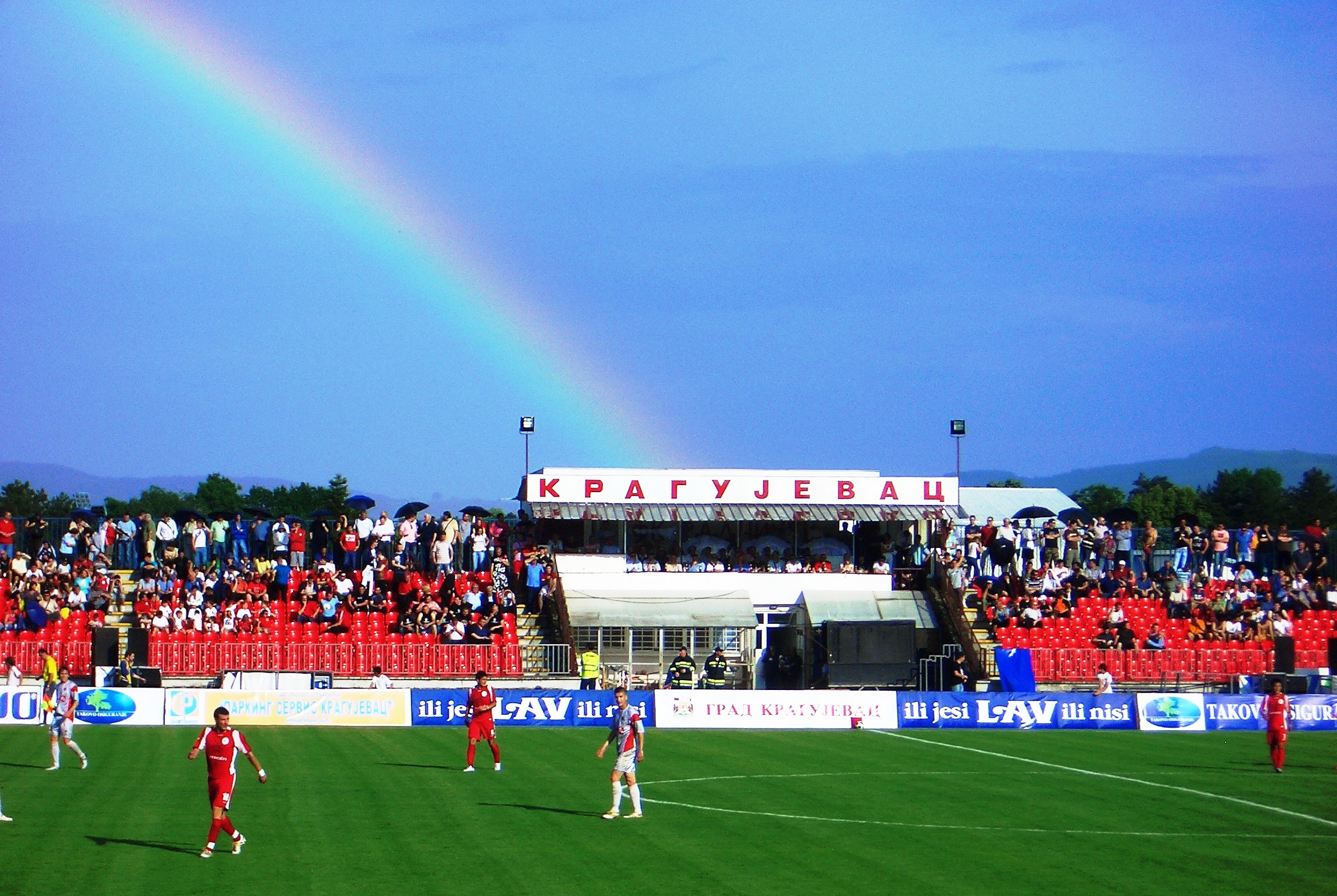
A rainbow behind Stadion Čika Dača in 2010.

The construction of the stadium began in November 1949 and took eight years for various reasons. Finally, the club's new football home was finished on 6 June 1957. The newly built stadium has received 30,000 spectators and the first game which was played on, was between Radnički Kragujevac and Partizan Belgrade and it ended 2-2. The largest attendance in a Yugoslav First League game was on 24 August 1969 when Radnički played against Hajduk Split in front of a crowd of 35,000. The largest attendance ever recorded in the stadium took place in 1969 when Radnički played a friendly match against Santos at which 40,000 spectators came to watch the legendary Pelé play in Yugoslavia for the first time.

In 2007, the stadium underwent a refurbishment, which included the installation of 15,100 bucket seats. However, in 2012, seats were removed from the nine northeasternmost sectors of the stadium. The stadium remained limited by the lack of floodlights, restricting game schedules to daylight hours.

=== Failed plans to build new stadium ===
In May 2023, the construction works of a new 20,000 seater stadium had been expected to start, costing around €70,000,000.

In January 2024, the government suspended the process due to all received offers surpassing the predetermined maximum budget for the project by at least 50%. Later in 2024, the plans to rebuild the stadium were abandoned, with the new stadium now planned in a separate location near the Maršić settlement.

The stadium underwent a minor refurbishment instead, with floodlights being installed and is planned as a training facility in the future, according to the Mayor of Kragujevac. FSS aided €500,000 for the process.

== Concerts ==
- Zdravko Čolić - 6 July 2004

== Gallery ==
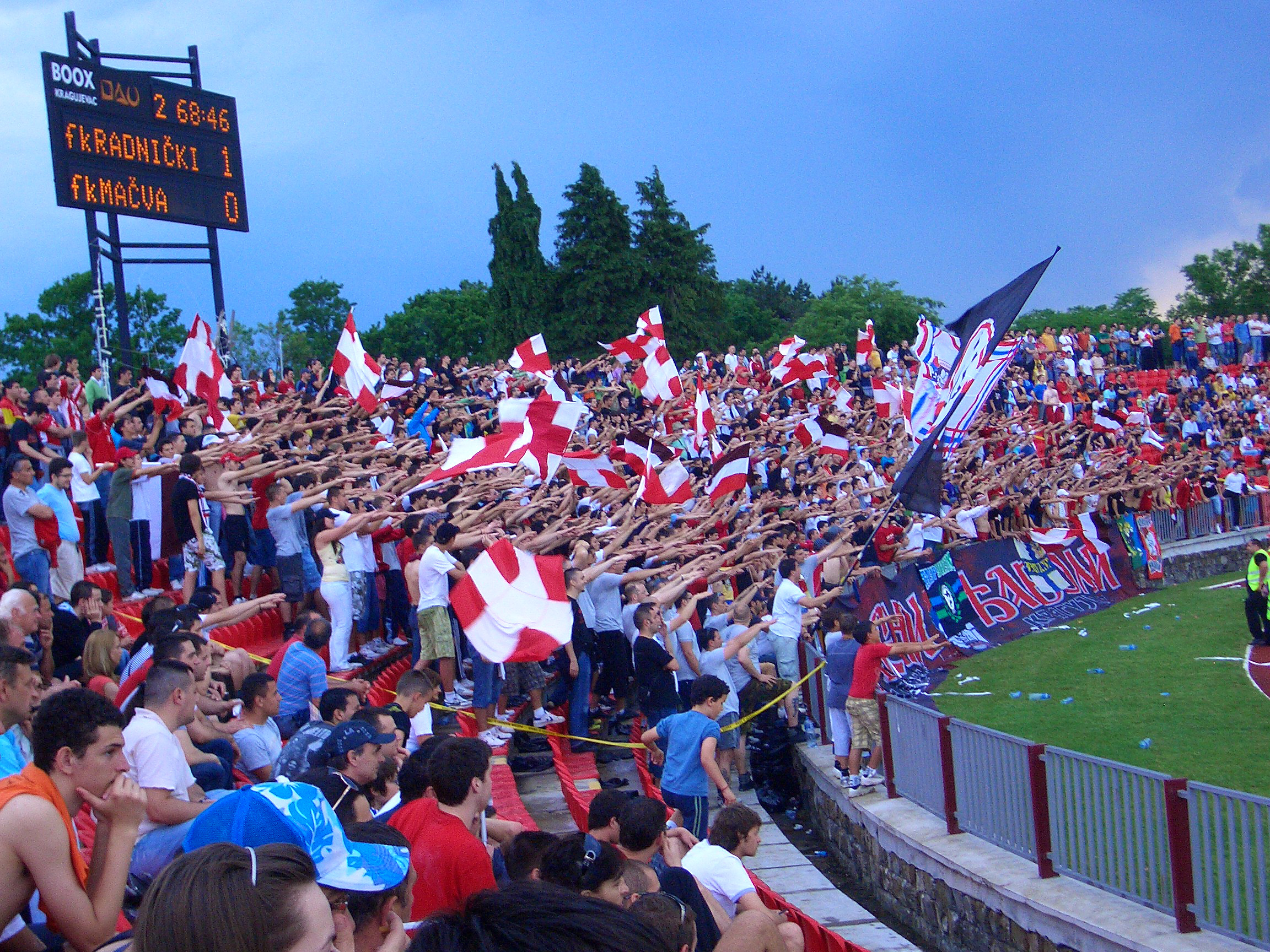
Crveni Đavoli at Stadion Čika Dača

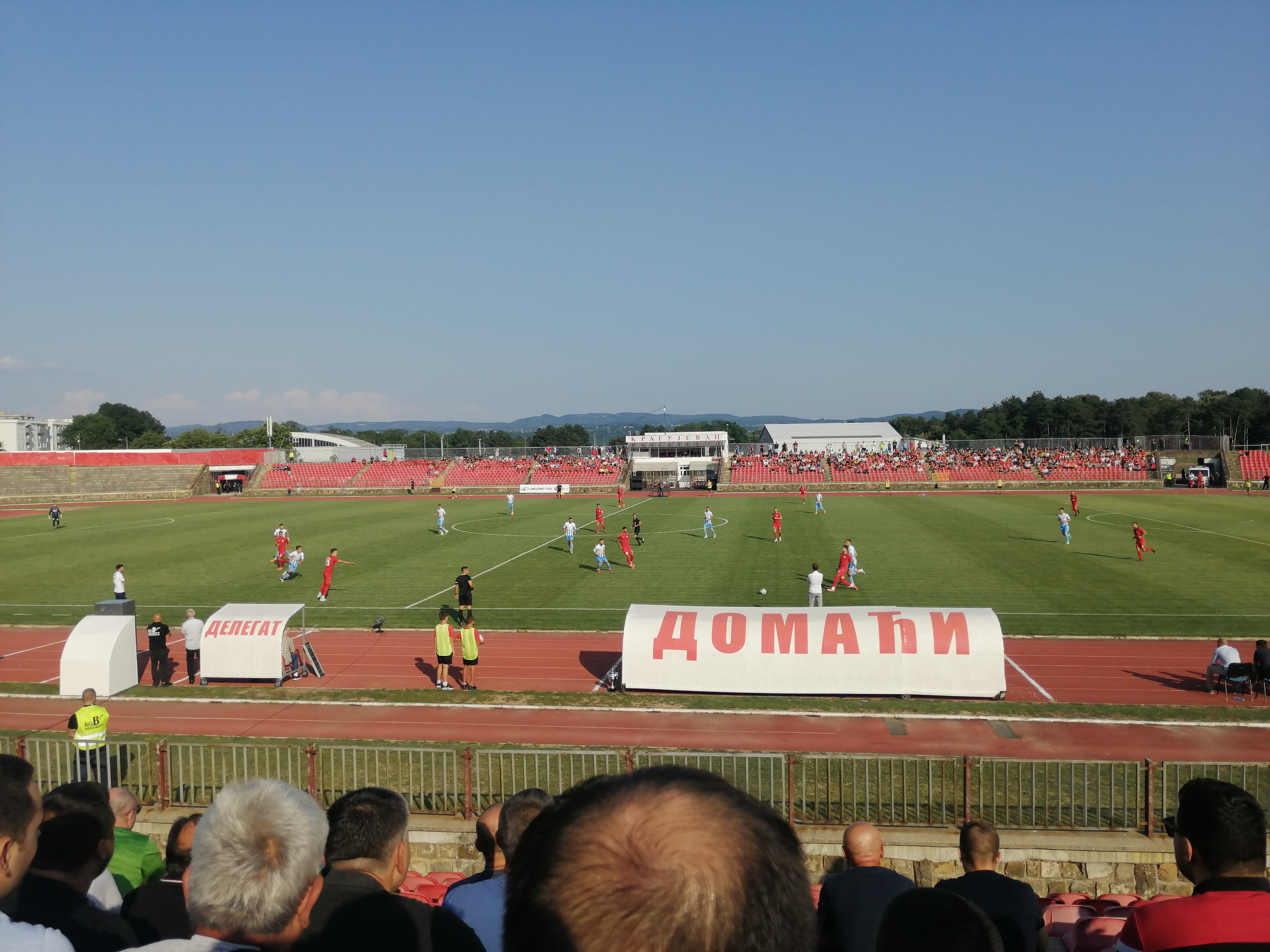
Inside the stadium

== See also ==
- List of stadiums in Serbia
