= Suicide Squad (hooligan firm) =

- Founding location: Burnley, Lancashire
- Territory: Burnley area
- Criminal activities: Football hooliganism, riots and fighting

The Suicide Squad is a hooligan firm linked to English football club Burnley. The self-imposed title was derived from the group's previous behaviour at away games, where its members' willingness to engage in violence despite overwhelming odds was perceived as reckless or near-suicidal. By 1985, the name had become synonymous with the group.

== History ==
From the mid-1970s to the mid-1980s, when Burnley F.C. went down from the First to the Fourth Division, the football hooligan firm Suicide Squad emerged from within the club's fanbase. The firm developed a reputation for its organised and disciplined approach to football hooliganism, and soon became one of the best-known hooligan groups in British football.

Although the group had partially disbanded, a younger generation of hooligans began to emerge under the name Burnley Youth, while retaining associations with the Suicide Squad. The police began to receive intelligence reports from members of the Suicide Squad who were concerned that the younger group were "out of control" and were travelling to away matches with weapons. The level of violence and the circumstances surrounding these incidents strongly supported these concerns.

In November 2002, Burnley police and the football club jointly established "Operation Fixture", a scheme aimed at tackling football hooliganism in and around the club's home stadium, Turf Moor, with more bans, more arrests and quicker convictions. The scheme also aimed to target "racists", with the example of a Burnley fan having given a Nazi salute during a League Cup game against Tottenham Hotspur.

In December of the same year, a 17-year-old Nottingham Forest fan was killed when Burnley hooligans attacked Forest fans in Burnley town centre. Shortly afterwards, the 19-year-old Andrew McNee, a member of the Suicide Youth Squad, was arrested and charged with murder. He was sentenced to seven years in youth custody after he pleaded guilty to manslaughter in July 2003. He was also banned from football matches for ten years. When passing sentence, the trial judge commented that the attack had happened, "for absolutely no reason, other than he supported a different football team and had the temerity to visit a public house the defendant and others believed he should have kept away from"; adding that football hooliganism was a "scourge on the sport" and said the courts should make it clear that anyone involved in violence would face harsh sentences. McNee was released from prison in 2006. Within weeks however, he was fined £200 after pleading guilty to breaching his ten-year football banning order. On 22 July 2006, police caught him outside Turf Moor when Burnley played Bolton Wanderers, Burnley's first home game since McNee had been released from prison.

The Suicide Squad featured in the 2006 television documentary series The Real Football Factories which was first shown on the Bravo television channel.

In July 2007, one of the founding members of the Suicide Squad, Andrew Porter, was coming to the end of a three-year ban from attending both England and domestic matches. However, Burnley police applied for a fresh banning order with the start of the new season only weeks away under "Operation Fixture".

In May 2009, another founder member of the Suicide Squad, Philip Holmes, was banned for a further three years from English and Welsh football grounds. The ban followed a steady stream of incidents since Holmes' original ban expired in February 2007, including being the central figure in games against Stoke City and Sheffield United in the 2008–09 season.

On 18 October 2009, following the East Lancashire derby between Blackburn Rovers and Burnley at Ewood Park, members of the Suicide Squad clashed at the Station public house in the Cherry Tree area in a riot described by police officers as "like something out of Braveheart". In January 2011, 12 members of the Suicide Squad received prison sentences totalling 32 years along with lengthy banning orders. Andrew Porter was discovered to have organised the riot, receiving the heaviest sentence; a five-year prison sentence along with a ten-year banning order. In 2005, Porter had written a book — Suicide Squad: The Inside Story of a Football Firm — about his experiences as a football hooligan.
