= Baby Squad =

- Founding location: Leicester
- Years active: 1981–present
- Territory: Leicester area
- Ethnicity: Mostly White and Asian British
- Membership (est.): 90-110
- Criminal activities: Football hooliganism, riots and fighting

The Baby Squad is a football hooligan firm linked to Leicester City F.C.

== History ==
Some of the Baby Squad's most notable clashes have been with the Chelsea Headhunters, who are affiliated to Chelsea F.C. In August 2000, Leicester were listed as the 2nd most violent football club in England and Wales.

In February 2008, eleven men were arrested after up to 100 hooligans were involved in running battles between fans from Leicester City and Coventry City outside a pub in Coventry. Police confiscated knives and one man suffered minor head injuries. The week before the incident with Coventry fans, 13 men were arrested after clashes between fans from Leicester and Norwich in which some men sustained minor injuries.
