= HooNaRa =

Far-right Chemnitzer FC hooligan group

Hooligans-Nazis-Racists (HooNaRa) is a far-right hooligan group based around the German association football club Chemnitzer FC, which has been active since the early 1990s.

== History ==
HooNaRa was founded in the early 1990s by Thomas Haller, who also ran the security service CFC Security. Accordingly, the followers and members of the association were the target of various police investigations in the 1990s. About once a month, the group drove to various fights with other firms in the hooligan milieu. In 2006, CFC Security broke from Haller, as his comments to the football magazine Rund were considered harmful to its image. Shortly thereafter, HooNaRa was banned from Chemnitzer FC's Stadion an der Gellertstraße.

Haller was replaced as a leading figure in the firm by martial artist Rico Malt. Since 2007, the group is officially considered dissolved. However, it still exists as a loose network of about 20 to 30 hooligans. Journalist Steffen Dobbert said Haller told him: "Actually, there is no longer 'HooNaRa', on the other hand, we are there in half an hour."

Haller died of cancer in 2019 and Chemnitzer FC held a tribute to him shortly before kick-off against VSG Altglienicke. The controversial tribute resulted in the resignation of the club's chief executive Thomas Uhlig and the firing of several staff members.

== See also ==
- List of hooligan firms
