= Blades Business Crew =

Football hooligan group in Sheffield

- Founding location: Sheffield
- Years active: 1983–present
- Territory: Sheffield area
- Membership (est.): 1000–2500
- Criminal activities: Football hooliganism, riots and fighting

Blades Business Crew (BBC) is a football hooligan firm linked to the English football club, Sheffield United F.C.

The term 'Blades' is taken from the football club's nickname, "The Blades".

== Background ==
A notable former member of the Blades Business Crew is former Housemartins and Beautiful South front man Paul Heaton. In March 1998, a member of the firm was imprisoned for knocking out the linesman during a Division One game against Portsmouth.

Though now not as active as they were in the 1980s and 1990s, the Crew have been the subject of numerous incidents of fan trouble in recent years. Following the Battle of Bramall Lane in 2002, in which a Division One fixture against West Bromwich Albion was abandoned due to having only six players left on the pitch, fans of the two clubs were involved in fighting outside the ground. During United's 5-3 Division One victory over Cardiff City in 2003, there were numerous incidents of coin-throwing and violence between supporters, and four Cardiff fans were injured. In May 2011, Blades hooligans threw missiles at visiting Barnsley fans at Sheffield station following the clubs' relegation from the Championship. Three men were later convicted with affray. In March 2012, four members of the firm attacked a group of teenage Brentford fans after the League One clash at Griffin Park. Recent members include Kev Kharas of the London band Real Lies, who claimed to have been "completely intoxicated by the organisation" after meeting a member on a National Express coach, and speaking to him on and off for a quarter of an hour.

== In popular culture ==
The book, Blades Business Crew: The Inside Story of a Football Hooligan Gang, published in 2002, was written by a member of the firm, Steve Cowens, who had been associated with them since the early 1980s. As well as informing readers about the activities of the Blades Business Crew, he also told stories of numerous other football firms, including those of smaller and less well known clubs.
