= 6.57 Crew =

Criminal organisation and Football hooligan firm

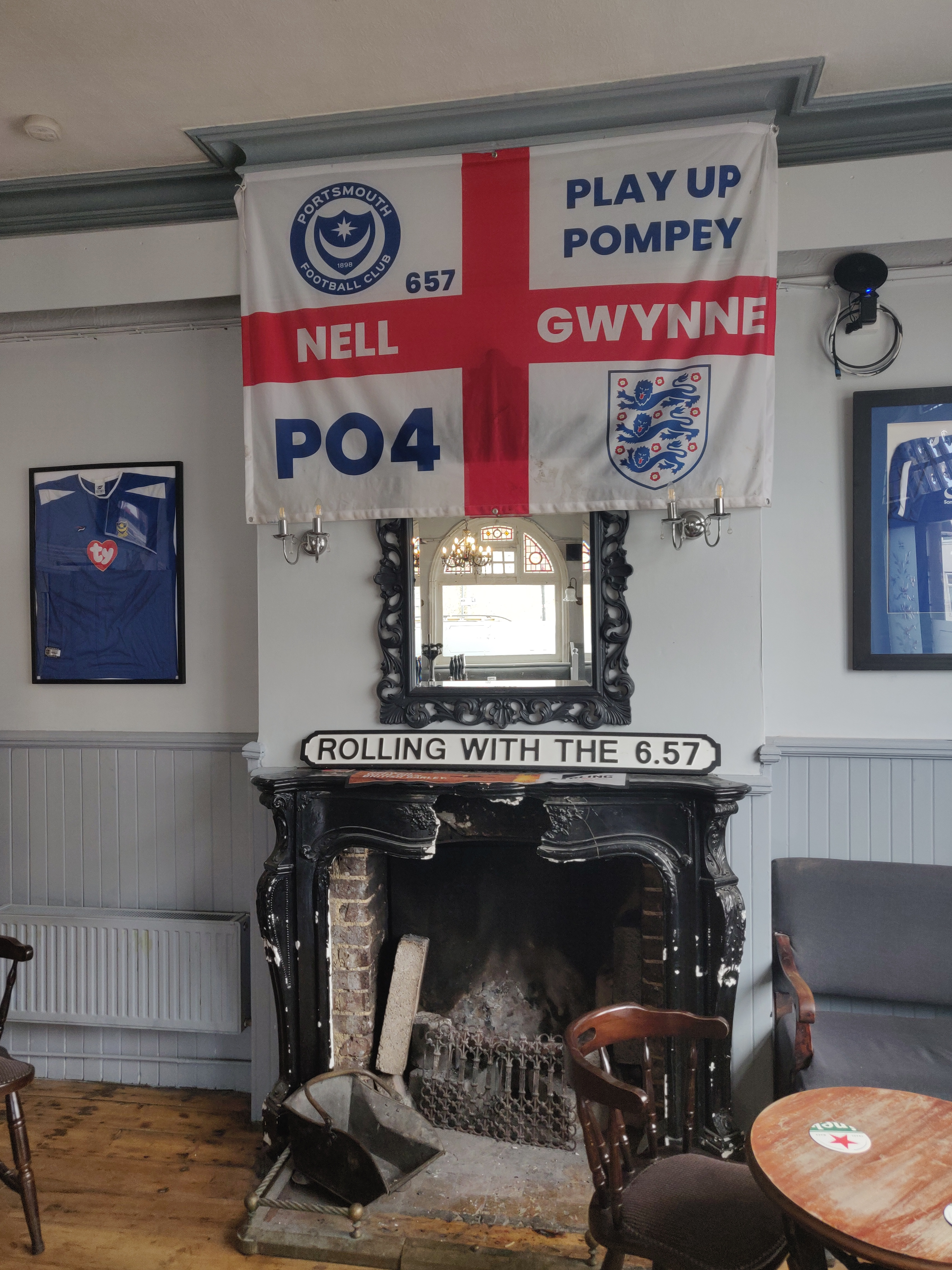
- Founded by: Scott Short
- Founding location: Portsmouth
- Years active: 1980–present
- Territory: Portsmouth area
- Ethnicity: Mostly White British, Northern Irish, Irish
- Membership (est.): 1980s - 200-500 2000 - present - 50-150
- Criminal activities: Football hooliganism, riots fighting Loan sharking, armed robbery, bombing, Racketeering, drug trafficking, witness tampering, murder, human trafficking, extortion, bribery, pimping, bookmaking, money laundering, smuggling, RFID skimming, contract killing, prostitution, art theft fraud, arms trafficking, theft, illegal gambling

The 6.57 Crew is an English football hooligan firm and vigilante group linked to Portsmouth F.C. The name, 6.57 Crew is taken from the time that the Portsmouth to London Waterloo train left Portsmouth and Southsea station. The firm were one of the most active firms in the 1980s.

== Background ==
Although officially apolitical, the 6.57 Crew have tended to have right-wing views, On 4 March 1987, following an away game against Derby County, the 6.57 Crew fought against what was described in the local paper at the time as "local black youths" for four hours. The 6:57 Crew was also reported to have links with far-right political groups. Around that time, some 6.57 Crew members would use the Nazi salute "for a laugh", and members of the 6.57 Crew have acknowledged that they had "right wing" connections.

On 22 September 2001, the 6.57 Crew fought with Coventry City fans both at the match and in Coventry city centre. Before the match hooligans from both clubs clashed in the city centre. Some Portsmouth hecklers tore up seats and hurled projectiles at Coventry supporters during the game. After fighting broke out in the stand, riot police were called in and restored order. Following the match, further violence broke out in Coventry again.

Ninety-three people were arrested for their involvement in riots involving over 300 people before and after a match with South coast rivals Southampton on 21 March 2004. The police were attacked, shops were looted, and cars were vandalised. Of those arrested, 64 were given banning orders, and some were jailed. One of the arrests included a ten-year-old boy who became the youngest-ever convicted football hooligan in the United Kingdom, when he was found guilty of violent disorder. In August that year, 54 Portsmouth hooligans were banned for life by club chairman Milan Mandarić for their involvement in the riots at the Southampton game.

As of 2023 the 6.57 Crew's membership is significantly smaller than it was in the 90s although members have continued to engage in violence, seated stadiums have made trouble inside Fratton Park a rare occurrence.

== In popular culture ==
The 6.57 Crew were featured in an episode of the Bravo documentary series Britain's Toughest Towns, which focused on Portsmouth hooligans. They have also been the subject of three books, Rolling with the 6.57 Crew, Playing Up with Pompey: The Story of the Portsmouth 6.57 Crew and 6.57 The Story of Pompey's Hooligan Crew.

== Travel ban ==
In May 2006, 130 Portsmouth hooligans had to give up their passports so they could not travel to the 2006 World Cup in Germany because of their convictions for football-related crime.

A Home Office report in October 2007 listed all football banning orders by club. Statistics showed that Portsmouth had 95 banning orders in place against who are termed "risk supporters", the most in the Premier League. However, there had been just one banning order, the second lowest in the Premier League, between 10 October 2006 and the date of the report, 9 August 2007.
