= York Nomad Society =

York City Football Club supporters group and hooligan firm

YNS logo

The York Nomad Society, or YNS are a supporters group and hooligan firm associated with York City Football Club, which plays in League two the fourth tier overall in the English football league system, after gaining promotion in the 2025/26 season. They are known for bringing medium level violence to Home and Away games and many members have been arrested over the years.

== Background ==
The YNS was formed in 1981 as alternative travel to away matches for City supporters. The coaches the YNS put on were cheaper and allowed breaks at pubs for drinking. Since the nineties, however, the YNS has become a hooligan group as well as just a supporters group.

In the Hooligans A-Z book, the YNS were described as being more akin to an Italian ultras group than a traditional English football 'firm', due to the fundraising carried out by the group. It was also claimed that, in one way or another, around 1,000 people have been 'members' of the YNS since its formation.

Former YNS member Terry Exelby was the first English fan to be arrested at the 1986 World Cup after drunkenly climbing into the luggage racks of a plane. When the plane landed in Texas he was arrested by the FBI.

== Hooligan firm ==
In March 2002 two York City fans were arrested on suspicion of assault following clashes at an away match against Cheltenham Town. In February 2003, seven people were arrested (four from Bury and three from York) following clashes at a home match against Bury. Between 30 and 40 fans clashed in York with missiles thrown and the police dog unit finally restoring order.

In October 2006 York fans clashed with Oxford United fans in Oxford when over 100 fans from both teams fought near the Blackbird pub. The clash was described by the Oxford Times as being a pre-arranged conflict. Three York City fans were arrested after a window was broken at the Priory pub after the match.
