= Maršić =

Maršić Маршић (Serbian)
- Naselje
- Location within Serbia
- Coordinates: 44°02′00″N 20°59′00″E
- Country: Serbia
- Region: Šumadija and Western Serbia
- District: Šumadija
- Municipality: Kragujevac
- Elevation: 784 ft (239 m)

Population (2019)
  - Total: 3,568
- Time zone: UTC+1 (CET)
  - Summer (DST): UTC+2 (CEST)

Maršić is a settlement in the municipality of Kragujevac, Serbia. According to the 2011 census, the settlement has a population of 267 inhabitants.

== Population ==
Population of Maršić
1931	1949	1965	1971	1989	2000	2009	2020
1,899 |	1,983 |	2,111 |	2,742 |	2,932 |	3,059 |	3,348 |	3,568
