= Millwall Bushwackers =

Prominent English football hooligan firm

- Founding location: New Cross
- Years active: 1950–
- Territory: South London South East London
- Ethnicity: Predominantly White British and Black British
- Membership (est.): 200–250
- Criminal activities: Football hooliganism, riots, fighting and arson
- Allies: Utrecht Bunnikside; Glasgow Rangers ICF
- Rivals: Inter City Firm; Soul Crew; Service Crew; Headhunters; MIGs; 6.57 Crew

The Millwall Bushwackers are a hooligan football firm associated with Millwall Football Club. Millwall have a historic association with football hooliganism, which came to prevalence in the 1970s and 1980s, with a firm made up of Kent residents, known individually as a Bushwacker. The "promotion" of a "Bushwacker", usually as they aged up, was to membership in "F-Troup". The term of self-reference among the Millwall southeast London territorial members is "geezer". Thus someone may refer to themselves as a "right proper millwall geezer". Millwall hooligans were by a wide margin the most notorious and feared of gangs in all of the UK. On five occasions The Den was closed by the Football Association and the club has received numerous fines for crowd disorder. Millwall's hooligans are regarded by their rivals as amongst the stiffest competition, with Manchester United hooligan Colin Blaney describing them as being amongst the top four firms in his autobiography The Undesirables, and West Ham hooligan Cass Pennant featuring them on his Top Boys TV YouTube channel, on which their fearsome reputation for violence was described.

== Background ==
=== Beginnings ===
"No one likes us, we don't care"
The infamous terrace chant of Millwall supporters — No one likes us, we don't care.

The stigma of violence attached to Millwall can be traced back over 120 years. Millwall played local rivals West Ham United away at Upton Park on 17 September 1906 in a Western League game. Both sets of supporters were primarily made up of dockers, who lived and worked in the same locality in east and south London. Many were rivals working for opposing companies and vying for the same business. A local newspaper, the East Ham Echo, reported that, "From the very first kick of the ball it was seen likely to be some trouble, but the storm burst when Dean and Jarvis came into collision (Millwall had two players sent off during the match). This aroused considerable excitement among the spectators. The crowds on the bank having caught the fever, free fights were plentiful." In the 1920s Millwall's ground was closed for two weeks after a Newport County goalkeeper, who had been struck by missiles, jumped into the crowd to confront some of the home supporters and was knocked unconscious. The ground was again closed for two weeks in 1934 following crowd disturbances after the visit of Bradford (Park Avenue). Pitch invasions resulted in another closure in 1947 and in 1950 the club was fined after a referee and linesman were ambushed outside the ground.

=== Hooliganism becomes rife ===
In the 1960s, hooliganism in England became more widely reported. On 6 November 1965 Millwall beat west London club Brentford 2–1 away at Griffin Park and during the game a hand grenade was thrown onto the pitch from the Millwall end. Brentford's goalkeeper Chic Brodie picked it up, inspected it and threw it into his goal. It was later retrieved by police and determined to be a harmless dummy. There was fighting inside and outside the ground during the game between both sets of supporters, with one Millwall fan sustaining a broken jaw. The Sun newspaper ran the sensationalist grenade-related headline "Soccer Marches to War!" Trouble was reported at Loftus Road on 26 March 1966 during a match between Queens Park Rangers and Millwall, at a time when both sides were near the top of the league table pushing for promotion to Division Two, but the London derby was won 6–1 by QPR. In the second-half, a coin was thrown from the terraces, which struck Millwall player Len Julians on the head, drawing blood. The stadium announcer warned that the game would be abandoned if there were any more disturbances from the crowd, prompting some Millwall fans to invade the pitch in an unsuccessful attempt to get the game abandoned. When Millwall's unbeaten home record of 59 games came to an end against Plymouth Argyle in 1967, the windows of the away team's coach were smashed. In the same year, a referee was attacked and the FA ordered the club to erect fences around The Den's terracing.

The BBC documentary Panorama was invited into the club by Millwall in 1977 to show the hooligan reputation was a myth and being blown out of proportion by reporting. Instead the BBC portrayed hooliganism as being deeply rooted in Millwall, and attempted to link them to the far-right political party National Front. The show was extremely damaging for the club.

On 11 March 1978 a riot broke out at The Den during an FA Cup quarter-final between Millwall and Ipswich Town, with the home team losing 6–1. Fighting began on the terraces and spilled onto the pitch; dozens of fans were injured, with some hooligans turning on their own team's supporters leaving some innocent fans bloodied. Bobby Robson, then manager of Ipswich, said of Millwall fans afterward, "They [the police] should have turned the flamethrowers on them". In 1982 Millwall club chairman Alan Thorne threatened to close the club because of violence sparked by losing in the FA Cup to non-league side Slough Town.

=== Kenilworth Road riot ===
The 1985 Kenilworth Road riot, after an FA Cup sixth-round match between Luton Town and Millwall on 13 March 1985, became one of the worst and widely reported incidents of football hooliganism to date. On that night, approximately 20,000 people packed into a ground that usually only held half that number to watch Luton beat Millwall 1–0. Violence started before the match when Luton Town fans hurled bricks, bottles and other projectiles from the roofs of buildings at Millwall fans making their way from the train station to the stadium. Overcrowding on the terrace holding the Millwall fans forced police to open security gates to allow supporters onto the pitch side to avoid a crush in the oversold terrace. Numerous pitch invasions, fighting in the stands and missile-throwing occurred, of which one such object hit Luton's goalkeeper Les Sealey. It led to a ban on away supporters by Luton from their Kenilworth Road ground for four years. Luton were asked by Millwall to make the Wednesday night match all-ticket, but this was ignored. As a result, rival hooligan firms gained access to the stadium. As well as the Millwall hooligans and those belonging to Luton's firm the MIGs, many of the 31 fans arrested after the violence were identified as being from Chelsea's Headhunters firm and West Ham United's Inter City Firm. The FA commissioned an inquiry which concluded that it was "not satisfied that Millwall F.C. took all reasonable precautions in accordance with the requirements of FA Rule 31(A)(II)." A £7,500 fine was levied against Millwall, though this was later withdrawn on appeal. The penalty that Millwall faced was perhaps that the club's name was now "synonymous with everything that was bad in football and society".

=== Birmingham play-off riot ===
In May 2002, hundreds of hooligans attaching themselves to Millwall were involved in disorder around the ground, after the team lost a play-off game to Birmingham City. It was described by the BBC as one of the worst cases of civil disorder seen in Britain in recent times. A police spokeswoman said that 47 police officers and 24 police horses were injured, and the Metropolitan Police considered suing the club after the events. The then chairman Theo Paphitis responded that Millwall could not be blamed for the actions of a mindless minority who attach themselves to the club. "The problem of mob violence is not solely a Millwall problem, it is not a football problem, it is a problem which plagues the whole of our society", he said. Paphitis later introduced a membership scheme whereby only fans who would be prepared to join and carry membership cards would be allowed into The Den. Scotland Yard withdrew its threat to sue, stating: "In light of the efforts made and a donation to a charity helping injured police officers, the Metropolitan Police Service has decided not to pursue legal action against Millwall F.C. in relation to the disorder". Some legal experts said it would have been difficult to hold a football club responsible for something that occurred away from its ground and involved people who did not attend the match. The scheme introduced by Paphitis now only applies to perceived high-risk away games. Many fans blame the scheme for diminishing Millwall's away support, such as at Leeds United where fans are issued with vouchers which are then exchanged for tickets at a designated point of West Yorkshire Police's choosing on the day of the game. Also, early kick-off times arranged by the police often result in only a few hundred fans making the trip.

=== Upton Park riot ===
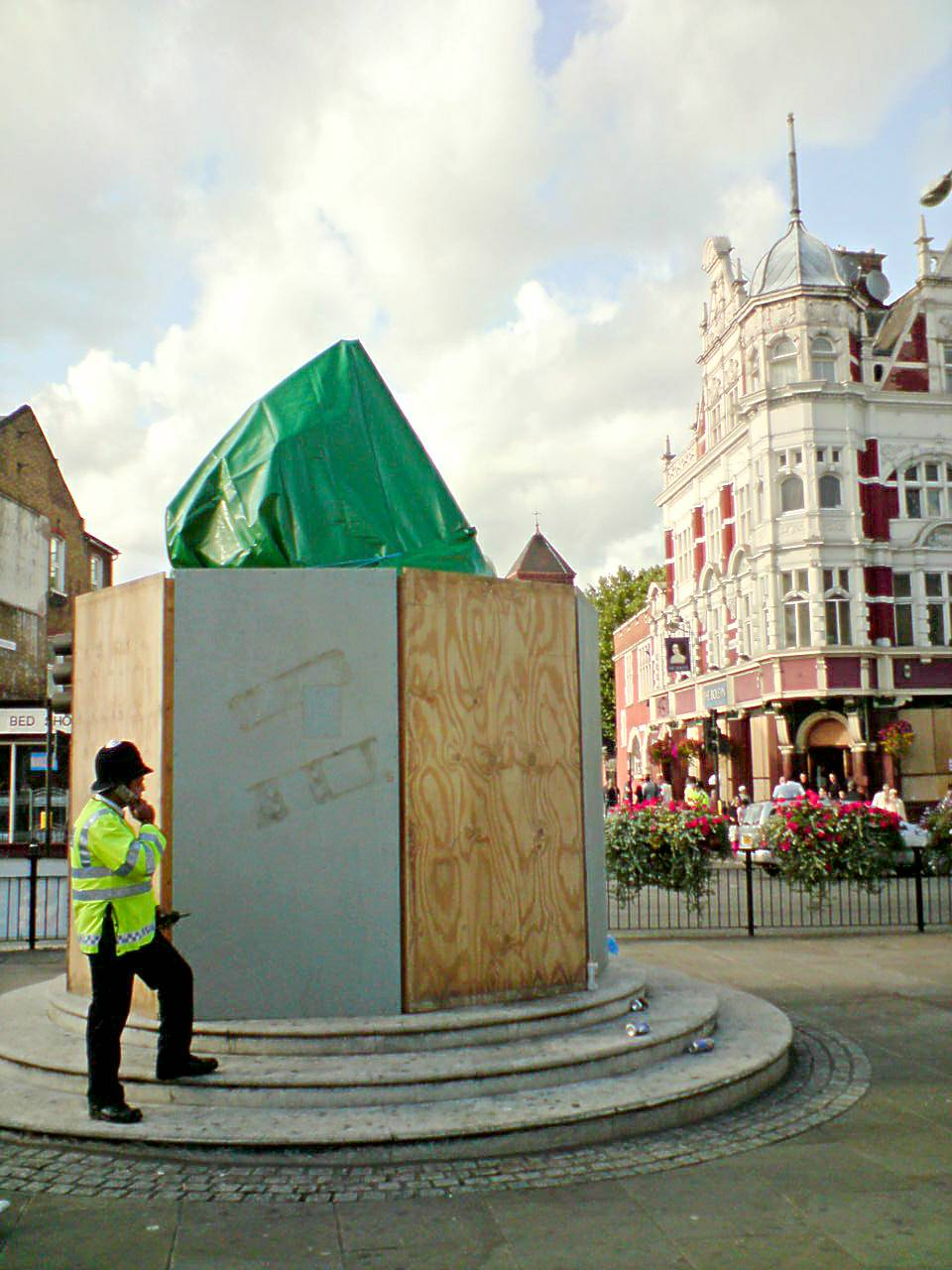
The World Cup Sculpture near Upton Park was boarded-up for protection before the visit of Millwall in August 2009.

The most infamous recent example of the rivalry between Millwall and West Ham flaring up was when, in the 2009–10 season, The Lions were drawn against The Hammers in the Football League Cup. The police halved the number of tickets given to travelling Millwall fans from 3,000 to 1,500, sparking anger among Lions fans.

On the evening of 25 August 2009, clashes between some Millwall and West Ham fans outside Upton Park resulted in 20 people being injured, including one Millwall fan who was stabbed. The game itself saw about fifty West Ham supporters invade the pitch on three occasions, forcing the game to be temporarily suspended once. The police later said the violence, because of its large scale, was organised beforehand.

The Football Association later handed Millwall three charges and West Ham four. Millwall were cleared of all charges while West Ham were found guilty of two: violent, threatening, obscene and provocative behaviour and failing to prevent their fans entering the field of play. The Hammers were fined £115,000 by the FA.

=== Sporadic incidents ===
In January 1988, when Millwall were knocked out of the FA Cup by Arsenal in a third round match at Highbury, 41 Millwall hooligans, were arrested after clashing with Arsenal's firm The Herd. In August 1993, Millwall relocated to the New Den and ended that season third in Division One, entering the playoffs to try and win a place in the FA Premier League. However, they were eliminated in the playoff semi-finals by Derby County, and the game at the New Den had to be halted twice due to pitch invasions by Millwall hooligans. There was also widespread fighting in the stands.

In October 2004, during a Football League Cup tie at home to Liverpool, Millwall fans taunted their Liverpool counterparts with songs making fun of the Hillsborough disaster which had claimed the lives of 96 Liverpool fans in 1989. This escalated into violent clashes between fans of the two teams. Seven months later, three Liverpool fans received three-month prison sentences and a further two avoided prison sentences but received banning orders. Three Millwall fans received three-month prison sentences and six-year banning orders.

In January 2009, hundreds of Millwall fans perceived as "high risk" individuals gained access to an FA Cup fourth-round match away at Hull City. The game, won 2–0 by Hull, was overshadowed when seats, coins and plastic bottles were thrown by some away supporters. There were conflicting reports in the media as to whether missiles were initially thrown by Hull supporters following chanting and jeering by Millwall fans at Jimmy Bullard (an ex-West Ham player) just prior to the fixture. On 25 August 2009, Millwall played away at West Ham United in the Football League Cup, losing 3–1 after extra time. One Millwall supporter was stabbed during clashes between the two sets of fans outside the ground. The game saw hundreds of West Ham fans invade the pitch on three occasions, forcing the game to be temporarily suspended once. The police later said the violence, because of its scale, was organised beforehand. In the aftermath of the disorder, Millwall were handed three charges by the FA and later cleared of all of them; West Ham received four charges and were found guilty on two counts: violent, threatening, obscene and provocative behaviour, and entering the field of play. West Ham were fined £115,000, an amount seen as an insult by Millwall, which staunchly defended the actions of its own fans and the club's inability to do any more than it had for a match at a rival's ground.

Former club chairman Reg Burr once commented: "Millwall are a convenient coat peg for football to hang its social ills on", an example being the reporting of convicted murderer Gavin Grant. Although he had played for eight different clubs, playing his fewest games (four) for Millwall, and was signed to Bradford City at the time, the BBC used the headline, "Former Millwall striker Gavin Grant guilty of murder".

After a game against Queens Park Rangers at Loftus Road in September 2010, manager Kenny Jackett said Millwall's hooligan problems are to a certain extent exaggerated by media sensationalism. "I see it as unjust. We are an easy club to criticise and in my time [at the club], the way we have been reported is unfair", he said. Other examples of this include archive footage of their hooligan element's past bad behaviour being shown, when disorder has occurred at other grounds, not involving them. During a game between Millwall and Huddersfield Town, The Observer reported that a Huddersfield Town fan had thrown a coin at a linesman, and that some Millwall fans had intervened, and handed the culprit over to police. The News of the World, however, bore the headline: "Millwall Thugs Deck Linesman With Concrete". This has led to a siege mentality among supporters of the club, which gave rise to the Millwall fans' famous terrace chant, No one likes us, we don't care, being sung in defiant defence of themselves and their team.

In April 2013, Millwall met Wigan Athletic in a semi-final of the FA Cup. Millwall lost the game 2–0. Towards the end of the match, violence broke out in part of the stand allocated to Millwall, with individuals fighting amongst themselves and then against police, resulting in 14 arrests, of which two were Wigan supporters.

== See also ==
- Millwall F.C.–West Ham United F.C. rivalry
- Leeds United F.C.–Millwall F.C. rivalry
