= Plava Unija =

Supporters of the Serbian football club OFK Beograd

- Nickname: Ofkovci, Unionisti
- Abbreviation: PU94
- Founded: 1994
- Type: Supporters' group, Ultras group
- Team: OFK Beograd
- Motto: One team - one city - one name - Belgrade, B strong, B proud, B U !
- Headquarters: Belgrade, Serbia
- Stadium: Omladinski Stadium
- Stand: South
- Coordinates: 44°46′59.52″N 20°27′53.69″E

Plava Unija (Serbian Cyrillic: Плава Унија, English: Blue Union) are the organised supporters of the Serbian football club OFK Beograd.

== History ==
When Beogradski Sportski Klub (BSK) was founded in 1911, the club which dominated the fields of the Kingdom of Serbs, Croats and Slovenes developed a significant fan base. Throughout the several wars that took place since the founding of BSK, the club's turbulent history (which is corresponding with the volatile history of the Balkans overall) has produced adverse effects onto the average attendance of today's matches in which OFK Beograd plays.

An organized group appeared for the first time in 1984 under the name of "Blue Thunders". The group lived under that name until 1990. When they were influenced by the rise of nationalism in Yugoslavia, they changed their name to "Sokolovi" (Falcons). The group officially collapsed in 1993 about a year after UN sanctions were put on Yugoslavia. The fans' love towards the club was certainly not forgotten and in 1994 a new group is founded – Plava Unija Beograd. The name remains the title of OFK Beograd's main group of ultras.

OFK Beograd's fans have been known to be resistant of past regimes. In the 1990s, FK Milicionar, a pro-regime police-backed team, entered the first division. When OFK Beograd first played against them, the OFK fans reacted with creation of banner which bore the message “Goal Against the Regime”.

== Friendships ==
Plava Unija fostered a friendship with Voždovac's fans, "Invalidi" while the club still played in Yugoslavia's second tier from 1996 to 1998. That friendship still remains to this day. OFK Beograd is also known to be supported by fans of Dynamo Moscow.

== Social activities ==
They Plava Unija express their love for their city, club and country with many creative activities. In March 2011, the Plava Unija started a project called ″Plava unija za zeleni Beograd″ (Plava Unija for a green Belgrade), which is dedicated for the promotion of healthy living and ecology, as well as raising environmental awareness among all the people who watch games in stadiums. It includes also the planting of 100 trees in Belgrade for the 100 anniversary of the club OFK Beograd.
