= Birmingham Zulu Warriors =

Football hooligan firm

Zulu Warriors
- Founded by: Birmingham City F.C Fans
- Founding location: Birmingham
- Years active: 1982-present
- Territory: Birmingham
- Ethnicity: Mixed ethnicities: white British, black British, Irish and Asian British
- Membership (est.): 250-700
- Criminal activities: Football hooliganism, riots and fighting

The Zulu Warriors are a football hooligan firm associated with English football club, Birmingham City. The Zulu Warriors were formed in 1982 out of an amalgamation of other Birmingham City firms including Apex. The name allegedly came from a chant of "Zulu, Zulu" which Manchester City fans aimed at Birmingham in 1982, due to their multicultural following. However, both the "Zulu" chant and the term "Zulu Warriors", in the context of a fan following rather than as an organised gang, were in use from at least the mid 1970s.

The Zulu Warriors have many members from different ethnic backgrounds (in stark contrast to most other hooligan firms which emerged around the same time, were almost universally white, and contained followers of far-right organisations including the National Front), Their main rivals are the fans of fellow Birmingham club, Aston Villa F.C. and there have been a number violent clashes before, during and after the Birmingham derby between the two clubs. The Zulus maintain that they are defending their city from invading firms.

== History ==
In October 1987, police arrested 36 suspected Birmingham City hooligans in an undercover operation in which they uncovered knives, coshes and diaries and photo albums boasting of violent attacks on police officers and supporters of rival clubs.

In May 1989, 20 Birmingham fans were arrested and five police officers injured when fans invaded the pitch at a match against Crystal Palace at Selhurst Park. It took seven mounted police officers to clear hundreds of Birmingham fans off the pitch. The referee took the players off the pitch for 26 minutes as baton wielding police failed to separate rival fans in one stand.

Following disturbances before and after a match in April 1999 between Birmingham City and Wolverhampton Wanderers the Zulu Warriors were the focus of a successful police operation against them, Operation Red Card. In February 2001, nine football fans were charged (seven with public order offences, one with drug possession and one with criminal damage) after Birmingham City and Cardiff City fans clashed in Cardiff before the Worthington Cup final between Birmingham City and Liverpool F.C. on Saturday 24 February. Sixteen people were arrested as fights broke out in Cardiff, with one person assaulted and nine people taken to hospital with minor injuries. St. Mary's Street in Cardiff city centre was closed for two hours and the Philharmonic pub smashed up as rival fans rioted. Three other pubs close by were also forced to close. The local police raised fears that Cardiff City hooligans would seek confrontations with the Zulu Warriors, and that the two firms had been using the Internet to arrange fights.

During the play off semi-final at Millwall in May 2002, violence erupted after the game. Sergeant Russell Lamb of the Metropolitan Police Service, a veteran of the May Day and Poll Tax riots, described this as the worst violence he had ever experienced.

Fifteen people were arrested in October 2002 in a series of dawn raids in connection with serious disorders committed in the Rocky Lane area of Aston before the game between Aston Villa and Birmingham City in September 2002.

Fourteen Birmingham hooligans received banning orders in 2006 following violent clashes on 27 March 2004 in North London. In February 2006 police were attacked as fighting broke out in Stoke-on-Trent after an FA Cup match between Stoke City and Birmingham City. The trouble in the Britannia Stadium started when a group of about 200 Birmingham fans tore down fencing separating them from Stoke fans. As fans left the ground, the police faced what a senior police officer described as "extreme violence" from both Birmingham and Stoke fans. In November 2006 a planned launch of the book Villains about the various Aston Villa hooligan firms, which included details of clashes with the Zulu Warriors, which was due to be held at Sensations Club in the Balsall Heath area of Birmingham, had to be cancelled due to threats that members of the Zulu Warriors would turn up and cause trouble at the event. The members of the Zulu Warriors were said to have taken exception to the launch of the book and the presence of rivals on what they considered "their territory".

In September 2007 five Birmingham hooligans were jailed for up to eight months and one given a suspended sentence for their part in violence at a match in which a steward lost the sight in one eye. The previous month, Birmingham City fans had started ripping up seats in the away end and throwing them as well as coins and a lump of concrete during a match against Cardiff City at Ninian Park in Cardiff. One missile hit a steward in the face causing him to lose the sight in his left eye. In a statement to the court, the steward said, "They paid no regard to the terrified men, women and children around them." Other stewards were also hit and families with children fled the ground as the violence broke out. One Birmingham City fan was struck on the head with a £2 coin. He said, "The behaviour of our fans was appalling."

They are known to clash in particular with Millwall, Stoke City, Aston Villa, Wolverhampton Wanderers, West Bromwich Albion, Cardiff City and West Ham United.

== In popular culture ==
The Zulu Warriors have also seen offshoot gangs created such as the Brew Crew and the Junior Business Boys They have featured in the 2005 film Green Street. The match shown in the film is supposedly between West Ham United F.C. and Birmingham City with a fight after the match between the Zulu Warriors and the Green Street Elite (GSE), the name used in the film for the Inter City Firm (ICF). The Zulu Warriors were also featured in a minor role in the 1989 film, The Firm. The Zulu Warriors have also been featured in the documentary series The Real Football Factories on Bravo. The Zulu Warriors are also a significant part of the story in the Steven Knight miniseries "This Town" released in 2024, although his story sees the Zulus as an already established gang in 1981 when his story starts.

The Zulu Warriors feature in the 2025 music video for the Jaykae song Hooligan, featuring The Streets. This was dedicated to Barrington 'One Eyed Baz' Patterson.
