= Chelsea Headhunters =

English football hooligan firm

- Years active: 1950–1986 (Chelsea Shed Boys); 1986–present (Chelsea Headhunters)
- Territory: West London, Northwest London, South West London
- Ethnicity: Mainly White British and European
- Criminal activities: Football hooliganism, racism, neo-Nazism
- Allies: Rangers F.C., Linfield F.C. SV Hamburg
- Rivals: Millwall Bushwackers, Inter City Firm, Soul Crew, Baby Squad, Leeds United Service Crew, Yid Army, Fulham, Brentford, QPR Bushbabies, The Herd, Celtic

The Chelsea Headhunters are a notorious English football hooligan firm linked to the London football club Chelsea.

== History ==
The Chelsea Headhunters formed in the late 1960s, and grew in importance during the 1970s and 1980s when football hooliganism in the United Kingdom was at its height. The group became notorious for its association with racism and white supremacy. Racist abuse was even levelled at Black Chelsea players such as Paul Canoville by fans of the club. Because of this, the gang initially drew followers with far-right views, including those who had no previous interest in Chelsea F.C..

The gang has links to various white supremacist organisations, such as Combat 18, the National Front, the Ku Klux Klan, and the British Movement. The gang also became affiliated with Northern Irish loyalist paramilitary organisations, such as the Ulster Defence Association and Ulster Volunteer Force. As of 2017, they claimed to have an alliance with the far-right Football Lads Alliance.

The firm was involved in numerous incidents of violence throughout the United Kingdom and Europe during the 1980s and 1990s. Amongst them were the 1996 Trafalgar Square riots.

Kevin Whitton, a high-profile member of the firm, was sentenced to life imprisonment on 8 November 1985 for violent assault after being found guilty of involvement in an attack on a pub on King's Road. After Chelsea lost a match, Whitton and other hooligans stormed into the pub, chanting "War! War! War!". When they left a few minutes later, with one of them shouting, "You bloody Americans! Coming here taking our jobs", the bar's American manager, 29-year-old Neil Hansen, was lying on the floor, close to death. Whitton's sentence was cut to three years on appeal on 19 May 1986. The fan responsible for the actual assault, Wandsworth man Terence Matthews (aged 25 at the time), was arrested shortly after Whitton's conviction and remanded in custody to await trial. He was found guilty of taking part in the violence on 13 October 1986 and sentenced to four years in prison. Matthews came to the public attention again in June 2002 when he and his 21-year-old son William received two-year prison sentences after they and another man were convicted of assaulting two police officers in Morden, Surrey.

On 13 February 2010, members of the firm clashed with the Cardiff City Soul Crew at the FA Cup fifth-round tie at Stamford Bridge. On 25 March 2011, at Isleworth Crown Court, 24 people were convicted of taking part in the violence, which resulted in several people being injured (including a police officer whose jaw was broken). All of those convicted received banning orders from all football grounds in England and Wales ranging from three years to eight years. Eighteen of them received prison sentences of up to two years.

Headhunters were involved in disturbances in Paris before a UEFA Champions League quarter final between Paris Saint-Germain and Chelsea on 2 April 2014. Around 300 hooligans were involved in pre-planned violence around the city, with hardcore hooligans having avoided police detection by entering France via Belgium. Around 50 members of the firm took part in an Islamophobic protest outside of the East London Mosque in 2017. In 2020, three hooligans with ties to the Headhunters were convicted of bodily harm and affray following an attack on journalist Owen Jones, who is gay.

== Allies ==
In 2000, Chelsea Headhunters formed a temporary alliance with other British hooligans supporting Rangers F.C., Cardiff City, Swansea City and Leeds United led by Arsenal's firm, The Herd, to attack Galatasaray fans in Copenhagen and Turkish fans in Brussels during Euro 2000 as part of revenge for the 2000 UEFA Cup semi-final stabbing of two Leeds United fans by a Galatasaray fan. Another alliance is with Hellas Verona fans since 1976 when Brigate Gialloblu's banner was exposed in the famous Shed.

Chelsea Headhunters' activities inspired numerous prominent Russian hooligan firms, and some high-profile members of the Headhunters took part in football hooliganism in Russia.

== In news and media ==
They were infiltrated by investigative reporter Donal MacIntyre for MacIntyre Undercover, a documentary series screened on the BBC. It was released on 9 November 1999, in which MacIntyre posed as a wannabe-member of the Chelsea Headhunters. He had a Chelsea tattoo applied to himself for authenticity, although the hardcore members, especially Jason Marriner, were surprised he chose the hated "Millwall lion" badge rather than the 1960s Chelsea erect lion. He confirmed the racism in the Headhunters organization and their links to Combat 18, including one top-ranking member who had been imprisoned on one occasion for possession of material related to the Ku Klux Klan. The documentary led to the arrest and conviction of several members of the group for the involvement in football violence. MacIntyre received death threats from the group following these events, and in 2009 two Chelsea fans attacked MacIntyre and his wife in revenge for the documentary and investigation.
