= Hull City Psychos =

Football hooligan firm

- Founding location: Hull, East Riding of Yorkshire
- Years active: 1967–2018
- Territory: Kingston upon Hull
- Ethnicity: Mostly White British
- Membership (est.): 200-400
- Criminal activities: Football hooliganism, riots and fighting
- Allies: The Minority, Under 5s/YCC (youth city casuals), Fenerbahce, MI-Side (Cambuur Leeuwarden)

The Hull City Psychos are a football hooligan firm linked to the English Premier League club, Hull City.

== Background ==
The firm dates back to the 1960s and peaked during the 1990s.

The City Psychos evolved from the original Hull skinhead gangs and the Kempton Fusiliers who were named after the east side railway stand at Boothferry Park. They were well known as tough representatives of Kingston upon Hull, a working class port city.

It was not unusual for the City Psychos to number over half Hull City’s away support during the years in the lower leagues at the end of the 1970s and start of the 1980s. They were famous for traveling to away games on Hull Corporation double-decker buses. From 1979 the more traditional scarfer element of support became known as the normals whilst these equally loyal supporters evolved in to City’s casual fans and were some of the earliest casual boys seen in Yorkshire outside the North West and obtained respect for their fierce rivalry with Sheffield United, Middlesbrough and York City.

== Today ==
The mob is now known as The Minority and the youth firm are known as the Young City Casuals or 'YCC' along with the even younger group known as the 'Under 5's'.
