= Crveni Đavoli =

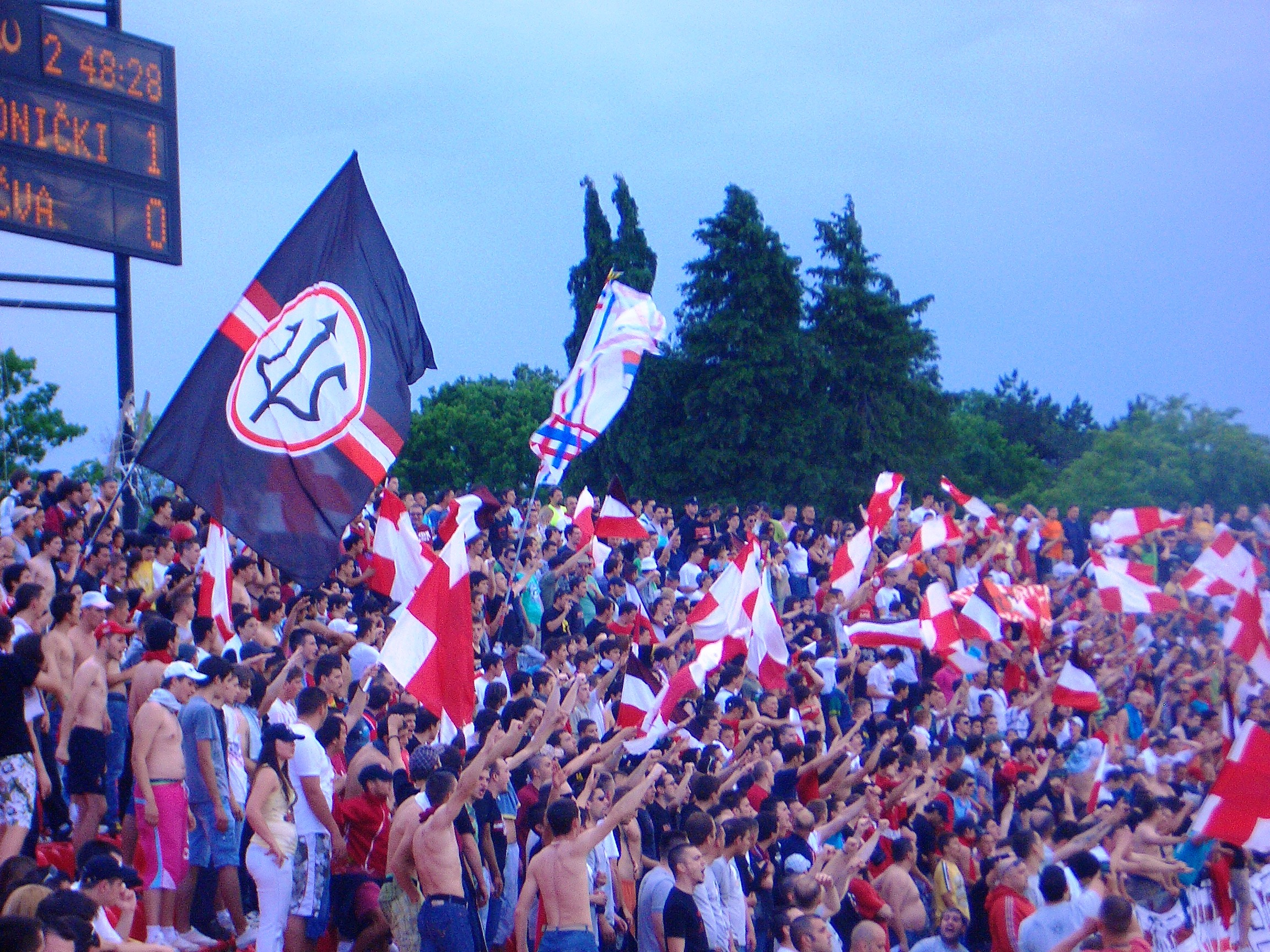
- A part of Đavoli at the Čika Dača Stadium
- Nickname: Pakleni (The Hellish)
- Abbreviation: CD89
- Founded: March 9, 1989
- Type: Supporters' group, Ultras group
- Team: Radnički Kragujevac
- Motto: Radnički and nothing more!
- Headquarters: Kragujevac, Serbia
- Arenas: Čika Dača Stadium; Jezero Hall
- Stand: South
- Coordinates: 44°01′15.14″N 20°53′57.10″E

Crveni Đavoli (Serbian Cyrillic: Црвени Ђаволи, lit. 'Red Devils'), or simply Đavoli, are the organized supporters of the Kragujevac based professional football club Radnički Kragujevac. They are one of main supporter groups in Serbia. Besides football club, they also support other sport sections of the Radnički Kragujevac Sport Association.

== History ==
=== Early years ===
Since its foundation, Radnički has been a magnet for the audience in Kragujevac and its surroundings. During the Kingdom of Yugoslavia (1918–1943), the followers of Kragujevac were one of the most numerous and loyal group of supporters, following their team wherever they played. They were recognizable by the red caps they wore. Trips to away games were organized, usually by train. The first "fan train" started on 29 July, in 1934. About 600 Radnički Kragujevac fans travelled to Belgrade for a qualification match for the national championship against BASK. After Belgrade, the "fan train" became a tradition, and the fans traveling to away games to Zagreb, Sarajevo, Split, Novi Sad, Niš, Skoplje and other cities. At the home games, against teams like Rapid Wien, Olympique Marseille, Ferencváros Budapest and Honvéd Budapest, up to 10,000 fans came to support the club. The support continued after the Second World War. In 1946, Radnički Kragujevac played against Red Star Belgrade for promotion to the Yugoslav First League. At the game there were too many fans at the former City Stadium, which was too small to accommodate all visitors and supporters of Radnički Kragujevac. This situation prompted the city and club to build a new stadium. The first game which was played on the new Čika Dača Stadium, was in 1957 between Radnički Kragujevac and Partizan Belgrade in front of 30,000 jubilant fans.

=== 1969 and the origin of the name ===
The real spectator boom began in Kragujevac in the late sixties. In 1969, Radnički were promoted for the first time to the Yugoslav First League after beating Sutjeska from Nikšić and FK Crvenka in the play-off. To Nikšić traveled more than 1,000 Radnički supporters and in Crvenka came up to several thousand. At that time began the first attempts at organized support. After being promoted the Yugoslavian league Radnički acquired much more supporters. In the home game against Hajduk Split were 35,000 spectators. But the away win against Partizan Belgrade truly made history. On 7 September 1969, the Radnički fans support their team particularly fanatical and organized one of the first torch show. The atmosphere was so good that it was compared with the atmosphere at Old Trafford, home of Manchester United (statements from local and foreign journalists and opponents). On this day, the Radnički fans and the club were given the nickname Crveni Đavoli (English: Red Devils), after the nickname for Manchester United. All thus made headlines. After that game, the Brazilian football giant FC Santos with the legendary Pelé was so impressed by the atmosphere, instead of the friendly game against Partizan Belgrade, they drove to Kragujevac and played against Radnički. They were not disappointed, because 40,000 spectators were at the Čika Dača Stadium with another seven to eight thousand fans surrounding the stadium. Radnički achieved with the support of their Đavoli in a legendary atmosphere a 4-4 draw. After this Đavoli started to attract worldwide attention. In these years Radnički's home games were very well attended and well known for its great atmosphere mainly made by Đavoli. Numerous Đavoli traveled to away games. So they went to the games to Belgrade, Split, Zagreb, Skopje, Ljubljana, Maribor and other cities.

=== Establishment and 1990s ===
The first organized meeting of the Đavoli was on 9 March, in 1989. Together, the fans went to the basketball game between Radnički Kragujevac and Napredak Kruševac. The Đavoli took advantage of this day as the day of its official founding. Initially a small group of kids. Mane, Laze, Amerikanac, Pižon and other local fans have participated in the foundation. The first tour of the Ðavoli was Bor. So they went to the games to Užice, Čačak, Kruševac and other cities. Besides football games, they also attended basketball games. In those years cheering starts again and the Đavoli began slowly to grow. But with the decay of Yugoslavia, Radnički sank deeper and deeper. The civil war (1992-1995), inflation, and the UN sanctions, hit the state and its population hard. Radnički played again in the third division and fewer Đavoli gathered. They struggled for continued existence for about two years. In 1994, the management organized tours for the fans. The first game was in Kraljevo, where the Đavoli went in two buses. For the next away game, there were up to five buses. To all away games, an average of seven buses and to the game after Požarevac even twelve were filled with the Đavoli. Over time, the situation improved and the Đavoli membership continued to grow.

== Characteristics ==
The Đavoli does not consist of a certain group of people with a specific identity. People from different social backgrounds are assembled at the group. The symbol of the Đavoli is a Hajduk with the Serbian traditional cap called Šajkača. In Serbian tradition, the Hajduk is a romanticized hero figure. During the 18th century, the dense forests of Šumadija were the refuge for the Hajduks that fought against Ottoman occupation. Kragujevac is the main city of the Šumadija region and the Šajkača belongs to the traditional folk attire of Šumadija. Hence, they use the rebellious soul of the Hajduks against injustice and the characteristic Šajkača cap as their symbol.

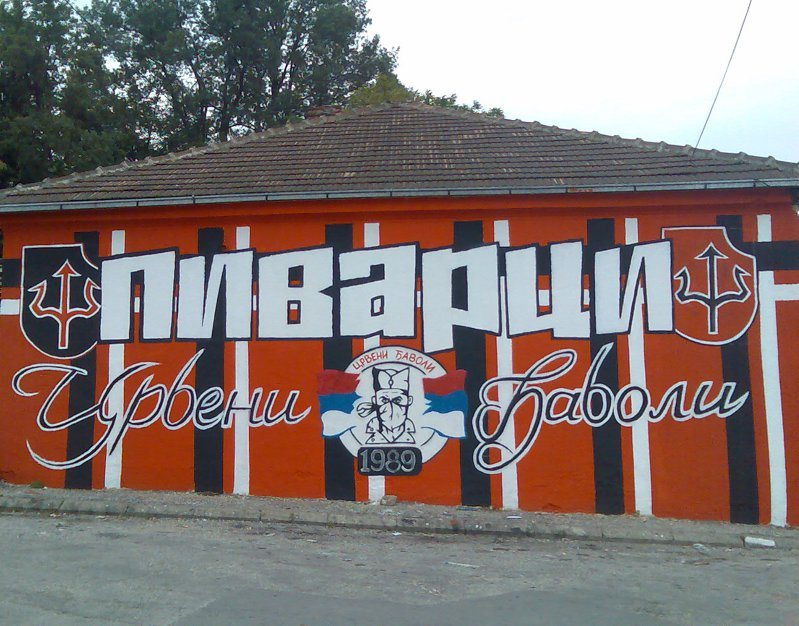
A graffiti of the Đavoli in Kragujevac.

The Đavoli are primarily an anti-fascist supporter group. One reason is the Kragujevac massacre by Nazi German soldiers during World War II. About 7000 Serbian men and boys were murdered. Therefore, there is a deep-rooted antifascist attitude within the Đavoli. The group's traditional colors are mainly red which are also the colors of all the Radnički Kragujevac sports clubs. During games fans will often be clad in red, as well as official team merchandise, and other products. Red caps are especially popular, just like the first fans of Radnički Kragujevac through which they were recognizable. Some also wear the Šajkača. Their style of supporting includes the use of flares and large flags, choreographies, chanting, and displaying banners.

== Friendships ==
They are in brotherhood with the organized fan group of FK Zemun, the Taurunum Boys. They have this relationship since 1998. It all began when a prominent Taurunum Boy member has lived and has a family in Kragujevac and the Taurunum Boys visited a barrage match back when Radnički Kragujevac fought to enter the major leagues. Ever since then the brotherhood has been growing and growing, and today it has been passed to the younger generations. The Đavoli have also a long friendship with fans of Sloga Kraljevo, the Kasapi ("The Butchers"). This friendship can be seen during football and basketball matches, where they chant together in the stands. It also started recently good relations with the organized supporters of Radnički Niš, the Meraklije. Some fans have personal friendship with some fans of Lech Poznan. Their relations began mainly through the mutual support of the growing local patriotism in the Serbian fan scene. There is a connection between the clubs as they share the year which they were founded, 1923. Also, both groups were founded in the same year, in 1989. The name Radnički means "Labour's" in Serbian and its roots come from the relations which the clubs had with Labour movements during the first half of the 20th century. Their often mentioned slogan is: "Radnička deca, radnička braća", which translates to "Workers children, workers brothers". Another connection is their anti-fascist attitude through similar tragedies which happened in both cities during the World War II. In the city of Kragujevac the Kragujevac massacre and in Niš the Bubanj massacre, both committed by Nazi German soldiers, which had in both cities a strong influence on subsequent generations. All reasons, why the first top tier match between these clubs ended during the 2012–13 season especially in a respectful and peaceful atmosphere for each other, although they not played against each other for a long time.

== Trivia ==
In the former Yugoslavia, the Đavoli were considered to be some of the most passionate fans. Being a fan of Radnički Kragujevac for some meant love for their team above all else, even their partners. Many of the male fans were fans before they got married, and so would take their future wives to the stadium and to tell them that this was their first and greatest love of their lives. One even took his girlfriend to the stadium and told her the following sentence: "This is my first love, you're my second". Then he made her a marriage proposal and she accepted it. Another story happened during a wedding. A couple of Radnički Kragujevac fans among the guests quickly went to the stadium, watched the game in their suits and returned quickly to the wedding.

== Crveni Ðavoli today ==
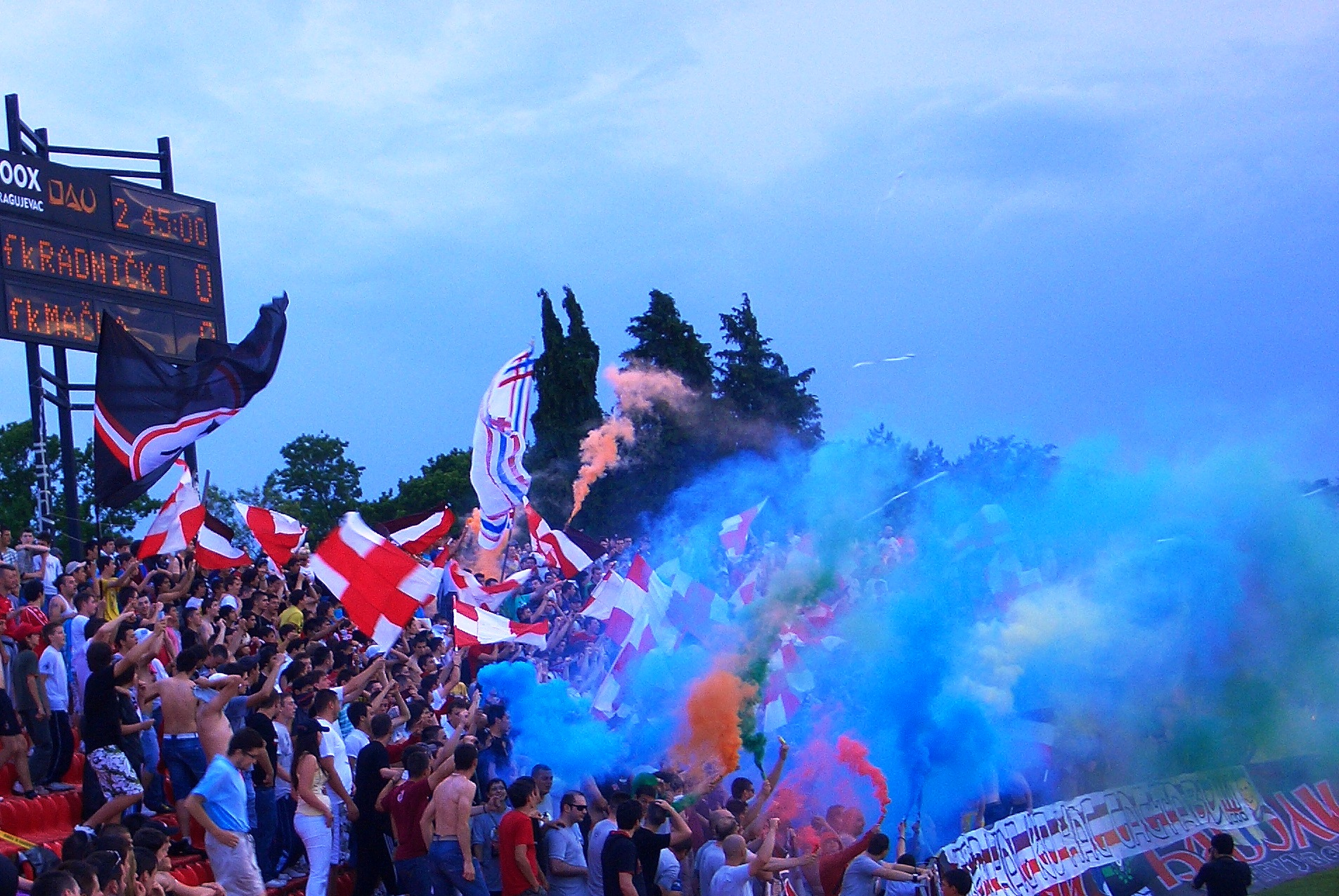
The Đavoli at the stadium in 2011.

The Đavoli grew again to a few thousand men organized fan group. People from Kragujevac and Šumadija District are accepting Radnički Kragujevac as their club, becoming its followers. Moreover, they have in own city the upper hand against fans of the Belgrade clubs Crvena Zvezda and Partizan. They are now one of the Serbian supporter groups and are more known as ultras. They are always on the south side of the Čika Dača Stadium, from where they support their club. Besides football, they also support other sports sections of the Radnički Kragujevac Sport Association, especially the basketball club Radnički Kragujevac, the handball club RK Radnički Kragujevac and the volleyball club OK Radnički Kragujevac. The goal of the Đavoli is to grow as a group and in his organization and the creation of an atmosphere at Radnički's games, especially at home games but also on away games.
