= Soul Crew =

Welsh football hooligan firm

Cardiff City Soul Crew
- Founding location: Cardiff
- Years active: 1983–present
- Territory: Cardiff area

The Cardiff City Soul Crew (commonly known as the Soul Crew) is a football hooligan firm, associated with the Welsh football club Cardiff City. From its formation in 1983 onwards, the Soul Crew would on many occasions become one of the most active football firms in the United Kingdom.

== Background ==
The Soul Crew name was adopted by hooligan followers of Cardiff City in the 1982/83 season, and comes from the small number of aspirant hooligans that had an enthusiasm for soul music. It was alleged that Don Cornelius, former host of the TV show Soul Train gave his blessings for the group to be known as The Soul Crew. They were featured in the 2002 documentary series, Hooligans on BBC.

Eleven suspected members of the Soul Crew were detained before the start of an FA Cup replay against Reading at Ninian Park in February 1998. Riot police were drafted in at the end of the game to prevent further outbreaks of violence between the Soul Crew and Reading's Berkshire Boot Boys.
