= Football hooliganism in the United Kingdom =

Violence associated with football in the United Kingdom

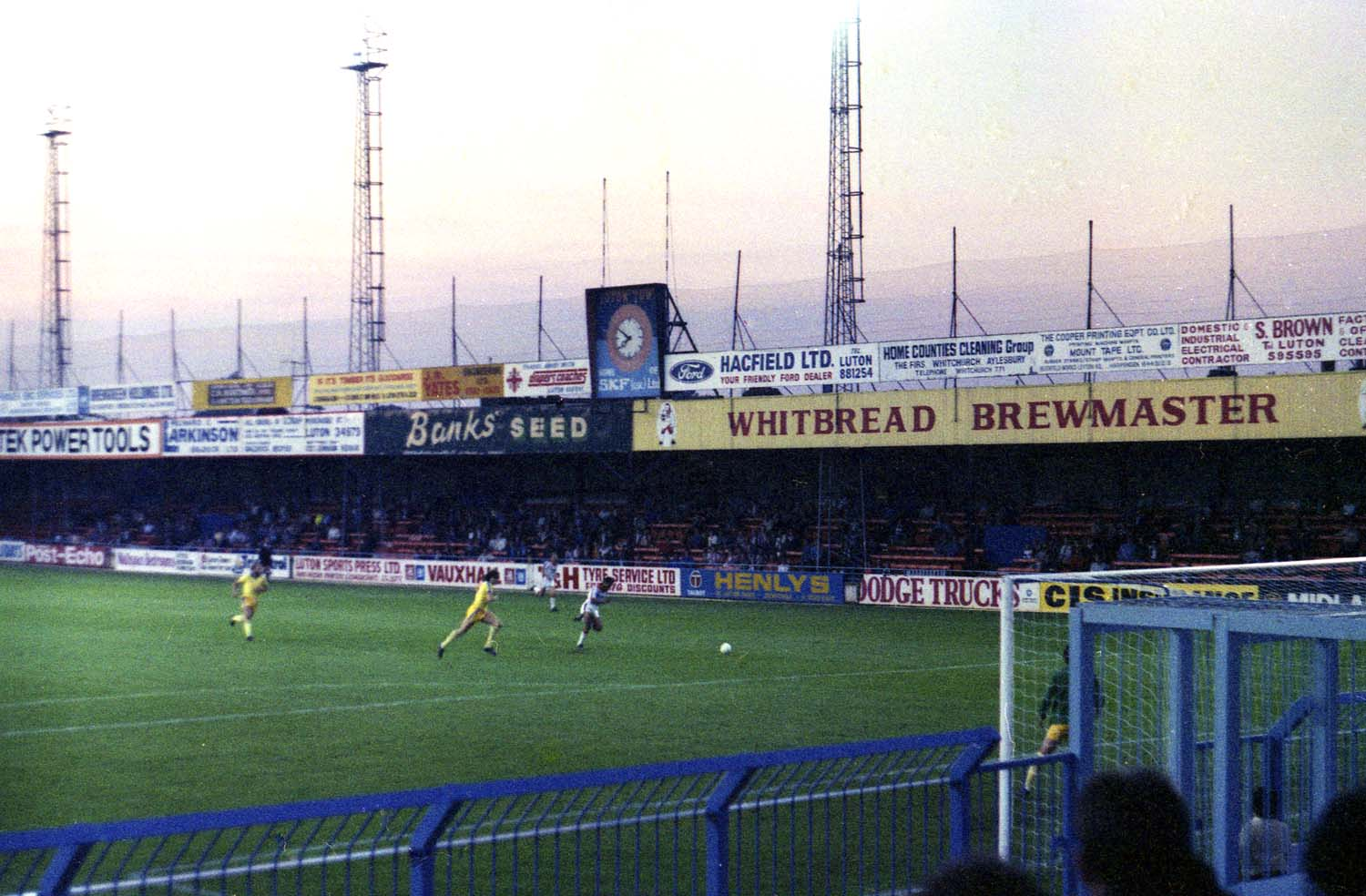
Hooliganism incidents in the 1970s led to fences being built at football grounds, such as this at Kenilworth Road, Luton (1980)

Beginning in at least the 1960s, the United Kingdom gained a reputation worldwide for football hooliganism; the phenomenon was often dubbed the British or English Disease. However, since the 1980s and well into the 1990s, the UK government has led a wide-scale crackdown on football-related violence. While football hooliganism has been a growing concern in some continental European countries in recent years, British football fans now tend to have a better reputation abroad. Although reports of British football hooliganism still surface, the instances now tend to occur at pre-arranged locations rather than at the matches themselves.

== Early history ==
Football hooliganism dates back to the Middle Ages in England. Fights between groups of youths often occurred during football matches organised between neighbouring towns and villages on Shrove Tuesday and other notable Christian days. Merchants concerned over the effect of such disturbance on trade called for the control of football as early as the 14th century. King Edward II banned football in 1314, and then Edward III did so in 1349 because he felt the disorder and violence led to civil unrest. A number of other monarchs and various authorities also tried to ban football over the centuries in England and Scotland but they were largely ineffective.

Hooliganism in the modern game of football in England dates back to its establishment in the 19th century. Individuals referred to as roughs were known to cause trouble at football matches in the 1880s, for example when they attacked the visiting team in a match between Aston Villa and Preston North End in 1885. Local derby matches would usually have the worst trouble in an era when fans did not often travel to other towns and cities, and roughs sometimes attacked the referees and visiting team's players. Incidences of fan violence have been reported from the late 19th and the early 20th century in England and Scotland. In 1909, thousands of Rangers and Celtic fans rioted at the replay of the Scottish Cup Final at Hampden Park. Crowd troubles also extended to areas outside of the ground, into the town as well as trains and railway stations. For example, Leicester City fans vandalised a train in 1934, and several trains were damaged in 1955 and 1956 by Liverpool and Everton fans. John Moynihan in The Soccer Syndrome describes a stroll around the touchline of an empty Goodison Park (Everton's home stadium) on a summer's day in the 1960s. "Walking behind the infamous goal, where they built a barrier to stop objects crunching into visiting goalkeepers, there was a strange feeling of hostility remaining as if the regulars had never left." The News of the World's Bob Pennington spoke of the "lunatic fringe of support that fastens onto them (Everton), seeking identification in a multi-national port where roots are hard to establish." The same newspaper later described Everton supporters as the "roughest, rowdiest rabble who watches British soccer."

Incidences of disorderly behaviour by fans gradually increased before they reached a peak in the 1970s and 1980s. Between 1946 and 1960, there were an average of 13 incidents reported per season, but between 1961 and 1968, the number had increased to 25 per season. Hooliganism in the modern age has been attributed by some sociologists to the decline of the British Empire.

== England ==
=== 1970s ===
Leeds United Service Crew badge, featuring the British Rail symbol.

Many organised hooligan firms emerged in the 1970s, associating themselves with clubs such as Arsenal (The Herd), Aston Villa (Villa Hardcore), Birmingham City (Zulu Warriors), Blackpool (The Muckers), Burnley (Suicide Squad), Chesterfield (Chesterfield Bastard Squad), Derby County (Derby Lunatic Fringe), Cardiff City (Soul Crew), Charlton Athletic, (B Mob), Chelsea (Chelsea Headhunters), Everton (County Road Cutters), Hull City (Hull City Psychos), Leeds United (Leeds Service Crew), Leicester City (Baby Squad), Middlesbrough (Middlesbrough Frontline), Millwall (Millwall Bushwackers), Newcastle United (Gremlins), Nottingham Forest (Forest Executive Crew), Manchester United (Red Army), Portsmouth (6.57 Crew), Queen's Park Rangers (Bushbabies), Tottenham Hotspur (Yid Army), Sheffield United (Blades Business Crew), Sheffield Wednesday (Owls Crime Squad), Shrewsbury Town (English Border Front), Stoke City (Naughty Forty), Sunderland A.F.C. (The Vauxies, Seaburn Casuals), West Bromwich Albion (Section 5), West Ham United (Inter City Firm) and Wolverhampton Wanderers (Subway Army).

In 1974, when Manchester United were relegated to the Second Division, the Red Army hooligan firm caused mayhem at grounds up and down the country, and in the same year a Bolton Wanderers fan stabbed a young Blackpool fan to death behind the Kop at Bloomfield Road during a Second Division match. These two events led to introduction of crowd segregation and the erection of fences at football grounds in England.

A bad-tempered FA Cup quarter-final tie between Newcastle United and Nottingham Forest on 9 March 1974 was halted mid-match when "hundreds of fans" invaded the pitch, one of whom attacked Forest midfielder Dave Serella.

The so-called "relegation battle", when Tottenham Hotspur and Chelsea fans fought on the pitch before Spurs relegated Chelsea in the return fixture in 1975, made national news when shown on the BBC television programme John Craven's Newsround. Leeds United were banned from Europe soon after, when their fans rioted after the 1975 European Cup Final against Bayern Munich in Paris. Manchester United were banned in 1977 after rioting before, during and after their Cup Winners Cup game with Saint-Étienne, also in France. In March 1978, a full-scale riot broke out at The Den during an FA Cup quarter-final between Millwall and Ipswich Town. Fighting began on the terraces and spilled out on to the pitch and into the narrow streets around the ground. Dozens of people were injured.

During the 1970s, black footballers became an increasingly frequent presence in English football, mostly born to Afro-Caribbean immigrants who settled in Britain from 1948. With racial tension high in many parts of Britain and the far-right National Front peaking in popularity at the same time, many of these players were subjected to regular racial abuse from fans of rival teams, whose fans often pelted them with banana skins, as well as making monkey chants or shouting racist obscenities. Perhaps the most notable player to suffer this type of racial abuse during the 1970s was Viv Anderson, the Nottingham Forest full-back who became England's first black senior international player in 1978. Black players became an increasingly frequent feature in the English game during the 1980s, and with hooliganism still widespread, incidents of racial abuse continued on a large scale. John Barnes, who made his Football League debut for Watford in 1981, was soon targeted with racial abuse by rival fans, which continued after he joined Liverpool in 1987, soon after which he suffered severe racist abuse. In 1984, soon after breaking into the England national football team, Barnes was racially abused during a friendly match in Brazil by a section of England supporters identifying themselves as supporters or members of the National Front.

=== 1980s ===
The [Inter City Firm], like the sub-groups from other clubs, specialises in infiltrating the terraces reserved at games for rival fans. Its members wear no club colours, carry apparently inoffensive weapons like umbrellas or hardened hats and maintain their anonymity by avoiding official supporters' transport. [...] Once the game has started they lay into rival fans, cause havoc, and melt away into the crowd.

— Nick Davies, The Anatomy of a Soccer Slaying, The Guardian, 8 August 1983

Sporting Events (Control of Alcohol etc.) Act 1985 (Note: Section 11(1).)
- Act of Parliament
- Parliament of the United Kingdom
- Long title: An Act to make provision for punishing those who cause or permit intoxicating liquor to be carried on public service vehicles and railway passenger vehicles carrying passengers to or from designated sporting events or who possess intoxicating liquor on such vehicles and those who possess intoxicating liquor or certain articles capable of causing injury at designated sports grounds during the period of designated sporting events, for punishing drunkenness on such vehicles and, during the period of designated sporting events, at such grounds and, where licensed premises or premises in respect of which a club is registered (for the purposes of the Licensing Act 1964) are within designated sports grounds, to make provision for regulating the sale or supply of intoxicating liquor and for the closure of bars.
- Citation: 1985 c. 57
- Territorial extent: England and Wales; Scotland (exception sections 1–9 and the schedule; (Note: Section 11(2)–(3).)

Dates
- Royal assent: 25 July 1985
- Commencement: 25 July 1985 (Note: Section 4(b) of the Interpretation Act 1978.)
Other legislation
Amends	Criminal Justice (Scotland) Act 1980
Amended by	Public Order Act 1986; Vehicle Excise and Registration Act 1994; Licensing Act 2003; Serious Organised Crime and Police Act 2005; Veterinary Medicines Regulations 2006

Status: Amended

Text of statute as originally enacted

Revised text of statute as amended

Text of the Sporting Events (Control of Alcohol etc.) Act 1985 as in force today (including any amendments) within the United Kingdom, from legislation.gov.uk.

During the 1980s, clubs which had rarely experienced hooliganism feared hooliganism coming to their towns, with Swansea City supporters anticipating violence after their promotion to the Football League First Division in 1981, at a time when most of the clubs most notorious for hooliganism were playing in the First Division, while those living in Milton Keynes were concerned when Luton Town announced plans to relocate to the town, although this relocation ultimately never happened.

On 1 May 1982, after a London derby between Arsenal and West Ham United, a supporter was killed in a riot between fans of the two teams. On 5 January 1985, an FA Cup third-round tie between Burton Albion and Leicester City was replayed after Albion goalkeeper Paul Evans was wounded by a block of wood thrown from the City end of the neutral Baseball Ground.

On 13 March 1985, Millwall supporters were responsible in large-scale rioting in Luton when Millwall played Luton Town in the quarter-final of the FA Cup, although a number of Luton fans were also involved in the violence. In response, Prime Minister Margaret Thatcher's government set up a "war cabinet" to combat football hooliganism. This was the first of several high-profile incidents of hooliganism in 1985.

Certainly it is a long time since followers of the Scottish national team or [Scotland's] great club sides have caused the sickening mayhem which English fans have produced in Belgium, France, Luxembourg, Spain and Switzerland in the past three years. [...] English fans have come to be regarded in Continental football circles as by far and away the worst in Europe, if not the world.

— The Glasgow Herald on English hooliganism in Europe, 1 June 1984

On 11 May 1985 (the same day as the Bradford City stadium fire) a 14-year-old boy died at St Andrew's stadium when fans were pushed by police onto a wall which subsequently collapsed following crowd violence at a match between Birmingham City and Leeds United. (Note: Fans started fighting when Birmingham took the lead, and riot police were called in to stop Leeds fans pulling down fencing. It was estimated that more than 1,000 fans became involved in the ensuing riot, which saw seats and advertising hoardings being torn up and used as missiles, 96 policemen being injured and the collapsing wall also crushing several parked motor vehicles beyond repair.) The fighting that day was described by Justice Popplewell, during the Popplewell Committee investigation into football in 1985, as more like "the Battle of Agincourt than a football match". (Note: The Popplewell Committee was originally set up to investigate two incidents at English grounds on 11 May 1985—the fire at Bradford City's Valley Parade (which was not hooliganism-related) in which 56 people died, and the riot at the Birmingham City versus Leeds United match. The Bradford fire overshadowed media and public attention to the tragedy in Birmingham on the same day.) Because of the other events in 1986 and the growing rise in football hooliganism during the early 1980s, an interim report from the committee stated that "football may not be able to continue in its present form much longer" unless hooliganism was reduced, perhaps by excluding "away" fans.

On 29 May 1985, 39 people, mostly Italian and Juventus fans, were crushed to death during the European Cup Final between Liverpool and Juventus at Heysel Stadium in Brussels; an event that became known as the Heysel Stadium disaster. Just before kick-off, Liverpool fans broke through a line of police officers and ran towards opposing supporters in a section of the ground containing Italian fans. Many fans tried to escape the fighting, and a wall collapsed on them. As a result of the Heysel Stadium disaster, English clubs were banned from all European competitions until 1990, with Liverpool banned for an additional year.

On 8 August 1986 rival gangs of Manchester United and West Ham United hooligans were involved in violence on a Sealink ferry bound for Hook of Holland. Eight football hooligans, all either Manchester United or West Ham United supporters, received prison sentences totalling 51 years 16 months later. Another incident was soon forthcoming: on 20 September 1986 Leeds United hooligans overturned and immolated a fish and chip van at Odsal Stadium, the temporary home of Bradford City following the fire at Valley Parade the previous year.

On 15 August 1987, thousands of Wolverhampton Wanderers supporters invaded the seaside town of Scarborough for their opening game of their Fourth Division campaign. Fifty-six people were arrested and thousands of pounds' worth of damage was caused in some of the worst violence the town has ever seen.

Millwall hooligans were involved in their third high-profile incident of the decade on 9 January 1988, when in an FA Cup tie against Arsenal at Highbury, 41 people were arrested for rioting after the Herd and the Millwall Bushwackers clashed.

Football hooliganism has also featured prominently with relation to the Hillsborough disaster, with barristers representing the officers policing the ground where 97 people died saying they had a duty to prevent "hooliganism and unruly behaviour" from Liverpool supporters, following the Heysel Stadium disaster. UEFA President Jacques Georges caused controversy by describing the Liverpool supporters as "beasts", suggesting that hooliganism was the cause of the Hillsborough disaster. His remarks led to Liverpool F.C. calling for his resignation. Many newspapers also reported that football hooliganism was a major factor in the tragedy, most notably The Sun, whose article entitled "The Truth" sparked a sharp fall in sales of the tabloid on Merseyside, with many newsagents refusing to stock it. However, a 2016 inquest found the 96 victims (rising to 97 in 2021) unlawfully killed due to failings by police and ambulance services.

Prime Minister Margaret Thatcher made a high-profile public call during 1985 for the country's football hooligans to be given "stiff" prison sentences to act as a deterrent to others in a bid to clamp down on hooliganism. Her minister for sport, Colin Moynihan, attempted to bring in an ID card scheme for football supporters. This scheme, set out in Part I of the Football Spectators Act 1989, was never implemented following criticism by the Taylor Report following the Hillsborough disaster. Documents released in 2014 revealed that the Conservative government of the 1980s crafted a number of schemes to combat hooliganism: these included an initiative to be titled "Goalies against Hoolies", consisting of getting "the more articulate goalkeepers, who are often first in line of hooligan fire" to speak out against the violence. Daniel Taylor, writing in The Guardian in 2015, described the revelations as "a reminder about how hopelessly out of touch the establishment were when it came to football".

Racial abuse of black players was a common feature of hooliganism during the 1970s and even more so in the 1980s, when they were first prominent in the English leagues. Before the early 1970s, only a small number of black players had ever played in English football, but the arrival of Commonwealth immigrants in Britain from 1948 saw many black players born in Britain to Afro-Caribbean parents breaking onto the scene a generation later. The first wave of black players mostly appeared for clubs who were based in areas which now had significant black communities—including Birmingham, Luton, Nottingham and West Bromwich.

John Barnes, capped 79 times for England, was first racially abused by rival fans, from Luton Town, when he began his professional career at Watford in the early 1980s, regularly being targeted with racist chants and having banana skins hurled at him. Soon after his transfer to Liverpool in 1987, Barnes was racially abused by Everton fans in the Merseyside derby. Everton chairman Philip Carter then denounced the racist Everton fans as "scum". Barnes was only the second black player to appear for Liverpool (the first being Howard Gayle, who had played a few games for the club at the beginning of the 1980s) while Everton had still yet to field their first black player at this stage. Also in the 1980s, Paul Canoville became Chelsea's first black footballer and as well as being racially abused by fans of rival clubs, he was even abused by some of his own team's fans—who had a reputation for being some of the worst hooligans in the English game at the time. Viv Anderson, who had become England's first black full international in 1978, was also subjected to regular racist abuse during the 1980s when playing for Nottingham Forest and, later, Arsenal.

=== 1990s ===
In 1990, UEFA lifted its ban on English clubs in European competitions.

In 1994, a few days before a Sunderland A.F.C. vs Nottingham Forest game, police snatched a pile of weapons, drugs worth thousands of pounds from Seaburn Casuals (firm from Sunderland) who were preparing for a showdown with Nottingham hooligans.

A riot on 15 February 1995, during an aborted England–Ireland friendly at Lansdowne Road in Dublin, resulting in 20 injuries and 40 arrests. When an English equaliser was disallowed, English fans in the upper tier threw items into the lower tier, ripped up seats and benches, and fought Garda riot police.

After England's defeat to Germany in the Euro 96 semi-finals, a large-scale riot took place in Trafalgar Square, with a number of injuries, and a Russian youth was stabbed in Brighton after his attackers mistook him for a German. However, by 1997, it was said by Reuters that the English game had "virtually rid itself of the hooligan scourge".

Before the 1998 FIFA World Cup, 26 hooligans from Seaburn Casuals (a Sunderland A.F.C. firm) were arrested in a police raid after a military-issue smoke bomb was let out at a local pub after a fight with bouncers. By the end of the operation, over 60 were facing charges. Some of the Seaburn Casuals hooligans picked up in the raid were also involved with neo-Nazi groups like Combat 18. The operation failed when judge ruled CCTV footage from the pub inadmissible.

France 98 was marred by violence as English fans clashed with the North African locals of Marseille, leading to up to 100 fans being arrested.

At the end of the 1999–2000 season, Sunderland topped the hooliganism table in the Premier League, with 223 fans arrested that season.

According to Colin Blaney in Hotshot: The Story of a Little Red Devil, many of Manchester United's football hooligans turned to serious crime during this period. He states that roughly half of the team's hooligans became involved in selling class A drugs, partly because of the wave of drugs that came with early 1990s rave culture, a scene that football hooligans were at the centre of.

=== 2000s ===
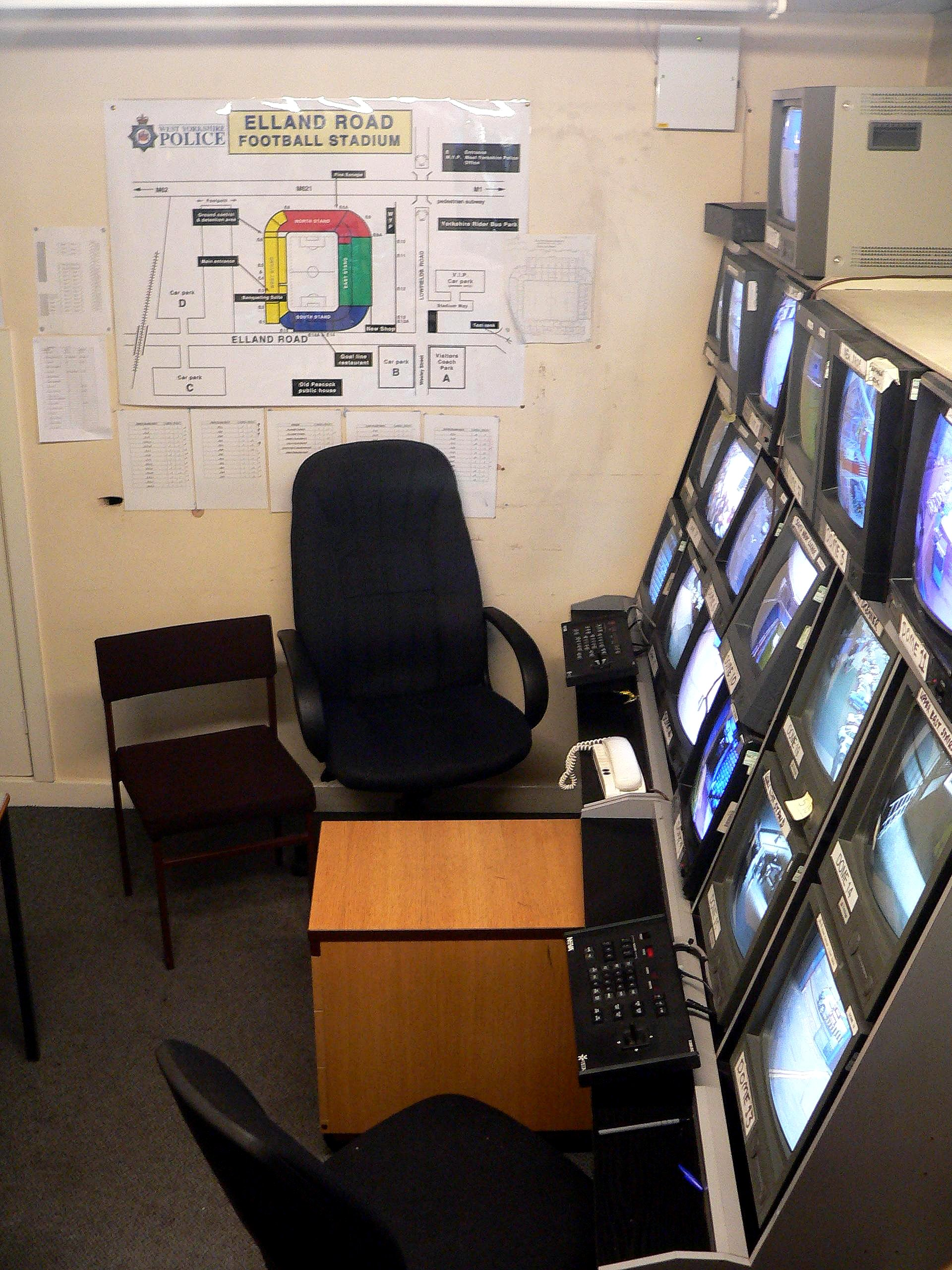
West Yorkshire Police camera system control station at Elland Road, used to identify hooligans and rioters.

In the 2000s English football hooligans often adopted clothing styles associated with the casual subculture, such as items made by Paul & Shark, Burberry, and Stone Island. Prada and Burberry withdrew some garments over fears that their brands were becoming linked with hooliganism. English hooligans began using internet forums, mobile phones and text messages to set up fights or provoke rival gangs into brawls. Fight participants sometimes posted live commentaries on the internet.

Football violence in British stadiums declined after the introduction of the 1989 Football Spectators Act, and in the 2000s much of the trouble occurred away from stadiums or abroad at major international tournaments. The England team was threatened with expulsion from Euro 2000 because of the poor behaviour of fans. The Football (Disorder) Act 2000 was subsequently passed by Parliament to give new powers to the police, including the ability to withhold passports from fans suspected of potential hooliganism before an international fixture.

In 2000, the BBC released a “hooligan league”. Wolverhampton Wanderers topped the league with Leicester City, Manchester City, Wigan Athletic, Cardiff City and Stoke City making up the other top spots.

In March 2002, the Seaburn Casuals (a Sunderland A.F.C. firm) fought with hooligans from the Newcastle Gremlins in a pre-arranged clash near the North Shields Ferry terminal, in what was described as "some of the worst football related fighting ever witnessed in the United Kingdom". The leaders of the Gremlins and Casuals were both jailed for four years for conspiracy, with 28 others jailed for various terms, based on evidence gained after police examined the messages sent by mobile phone between the gang members on the day. By the end of the 2002–03 season, Sunderland topped the football arrests table with 154.

The English reputation improved as a result of good behaviour at the 2002 FIFA World Cup and the 2004 UEFA European Football Championship, despite reports of the arrest of 33 England supporters in the latter tournament.

At the 2006 FIFA World Cup in Germany there were limited incidences of violence. Over 200 preventative arrests were made in Stuttgart, although only three people were charged with criminal offences. Another 400 were taken into preventative custody. Police believe that on average each rioter drank or threw 17 litres (30 imperial pints) of beer on that day.

The 2000s saw several death threats. Peter Ridsdale was a target of death threats from Leeds United fans. Swedish referee Anders Frisk quit his position after receiving death threats from Chelsea fans. Reading players Ibrahima Sonko and Stephen Hunt also received death threats from Chelsea fans in 2006. Fernando Torres received death threats from Liverpool fans. Sol Campbell received death threats from Tottenham fans. A steward died after serious clashes between firms from Aston Villa and Queens Park Rangers after a League Cup game in September 2004.

On 28 January 2007 Wolverhampton Wanderers hooligans rioted after their sides 3–0 home loss to local rivals West Bromwich Albion. 11 officers were injured and 9 hooligans arrested as bricks, bollards and road signs were thrown and gas canisters let off. Police fought running battles with hundreds of thugs as chaos descended on the city centre. Drivers were surrounded by violence in Stafford street and bus passengers looked on as the angry mob surged past. Officers used dogs to catch people who tried to flip over a police vehicle near Molineux, a number of pedestrians were injured after being caught up in the violence.

In February 2008, eleven men were arrested after up to 100 hooligans were involved in running battles between fans from Coventry City and Leicester City outside a pub in Coventry. Police confiscated knives and one man suffered minor head injuries. The week before the incident, 13 men were arrested after clashes between fans from Leicester and Norwich in which some men sustained minor injuries.

After some 20 years of improved behaviour among English football fans, extreme scenes of rioting and hooliganism took place at Upton Park on 25 August 2009 during a Football League Cup second round tie between London rivals West Ham United and Millwall. The pitch was invaded several times during the game by West Ham fans and rioting in the streets followed. In one incident a Millwall fan suffered stab wounds. The West Ham United-Millwall rivalry has led officials to threaten to hold fixtures between the two sides in private, although the threat has never been executed, save for a November 2014 U21 Premier League Cup tie between the two sides' development squads which was ordered by Metropolitan Police to be played at Rush Green with a 12pm kick-off behind closed doors.

=== 2010s ===
On 1 December 2010, supporters of Aston Villa and Birmingham City clashed at St Andrew's stadium after a Second City derby match in the League Cup, and 14 people were injured. Missiles were hurled on to the pitch, a rocket flare was released in the stands, and there were scuffles in nearby streets. By this stage, football hooliganism was rising dramatically, with 103 incidents of hooliganism involving under-19s in the 2009–10 season compared to 38 the season before.

Use of bovver boots in football hooliganism was countered in 2012 by warnings to fans that they would have to remove such boots in order to attend football matches.

In a match between Sheffield Wednesday and Leeds United on 19 October 2012, Leeds United hooligan Aaron Cawley attacked Sheffield Wednesday goalkeeper Chris Kirkland during a pitch invasion to celebrate a goal. The hooligan was identified on social media sites as someone who had previously been banned from every football ground in the UK.

At a semi-final match of the 2012–13 FA Cup between Millwall and Wigan Athletic at the new Wembley Stadium on 13 April 2013, Millwall fans fought amongst themselves although it is believed that a group of Wigan supporters got into the Millwall end, 14 arrests were made. The next day, Newcastle United fans rioted when their team lost 3–0 to Sunderland in their Tyne–Wear derby match in the Premier League. Bottles were thrown, bins were set on fire and a horse was punched as mounted officers tried to move crowds back to allow visiting fans to be escorted away. Twenty-nine arrests were made during the game itself.

On 7 March 2015, during a quarter-final match of the FA Cup between rival clubs from the West Midlands Aston Villa and West Bromwich Albion, hundreds of Villa fans invaded the pitch whilst the game was still in play. A further invasion took place at full time causing players from both teams to flee the pitch. Despite police officers and stewards best efforts to restrain the fans, it is believed almost a thousand fans entered the pitch. On the same day just 21 miles away a group of Wolverhampton Wanderers hooligans clashed with Watford F.C. hooligans, one of who spent three weeks in a coma. Four teenagers were jailed and two more received suspended sentences.

In February 2015, before Chelsea FC played against Paris Saint-Germain F.C. Four Chelsea football fans were convicted of racist violence and given suspended prison sentences after a black citizen was pushed off a Paris Métro in Paris while fans chanted: "We're racist, we're racist, and that's the way we like it." The four men were ordered to pay €10,000 to the black commuter they pushed off Métro carriage.

In December 2018, a Napoli fan by the name of Mattia, who attended a champions league group stage match between Liverpool and Napoli as a gift from his parents, claims to have been attacked by a group of seven Liverpool hooligans who surrounded him upon leaving the stadium. He was said to have been admitted to Royal Liverpool University Hospital with a fractured cheekbone and trauma to one eye. But it was apparently only after flagging down a car that he and a friend managed to get help. "I thought I was going to die," is the chilling quote attributed to the victim. The reports stress that this was an attack on a lone fan and not a fight between rival groups.

In his autobiography 'Undesirables', Colin Blaney, a high-ranking member of Manchester United's Inter City Jibbers firm, claimed that one of the main developments of the 2010s was that football hooligans were no longer involved in acquisitive crimes overseas. Whereas they had once stolen designer clothing from abroad and used international games as an excuse to loot jewellery shops on the continent, the football firms of today solely engage in profit-oriented forms of crime within the UK.

=== 2020s ===
On the day of the UEFA Euro 2020 final between England and Italy, riots broke out at the entrance to Wembley Stadium, and in Piccadilly Circus, Leicester Square and Trafalgar Square. 69 people were arrested.

In September 2021, Leicester City played Napoli at home in a UEFA Europa League group stage match. Supporters of both clubs clashed, which resulted in a street fight around a mile away from the stadium, and disorder at the end of the match.

On 28 January 2024, the FA Cup fixture between Black Country rivals West Bromwich Albion and Wolverhampton Wanderers was delayed by 38 minutes after violence in the stands broke out between fans of the two sides.

Many hooligans of various firms aided right-wing protesters and took part in the 2024 Southport Riots, in a misinformed response to the stabbing committed at a Taylor Swift themed dance class, in which 3 young girls were murdered. They helped rioters loot, commit arson, march and commit acts of violence against asylum seekers and people of different ethnic minorities across the country.

== Northern Ireland ==
Northern Irish football suffered a major set-back in 1948, when supporters of Linfield invaded the pitch after a match against Belfast Celtic, attacking and seriously injuring three Celtic players. A historical rivalry between Linfield and Glentoran has escalated somewhat in recent years – there were riots in 2005 and on Boxing Day in 2008. In the 1970s, the political Troubles in Northern Ireland spilled onto the terraces of the football stadiums. This is seen as a major factor in Derry City leaving the Irish Football League to join the League of Ireland.

== Scotland ==
Rangers and Celtic [...] have the most partisan fans in Britain. Their following has not only sporting, but religious significance. Rangers represents the city's Protestant faction and Celtic's players are the idols of the Catholics. Today's incidents are usual when the teams meet and police always try to keep their respective factions apart on the terraces segregated in stadiums.

— United Press International report on clashes between Glasgow giants Rangers and Celtic during and after the 1969 Scottish Cup Final.

One of the first recorded incidents of large-scale crowd violence took place after a 1909 match between Rangers and Celtic. The Glaswegian clubs clashed at Hampden Park at the 1969 Scottish Cup Final, with 50 arrests reported on the terrace relating to fighting and the throwing of objects onto the pitch. More arrests followed, after post-match fighting between supporters and police. Worse violence took place in the aftermath of the 1980 Scottish Cup Final between Celtic and Rangers. Hundreds of fans from both sides invaded the playing field after full-time and fought a pitched battle with one another. TV commentator Archie MacPherson likened the riot to a scene from out of Apocalypse Now, adding "At the end of the day, let's not kid ourselves. These supporters hate each other." Over 200 arrests were made, and both clubs were fined £20,000 by the Scottish Football Association (SFA). In the aftermath, an Act of Parliament was passed that banned the sale of alcoholic beverages within Scottish sports grounds.

By the 1982 Aberdeen first casuals 1983/84 the Casual manifestation of football hooliganism was adopted by fans of many clubs in Scotland with Aberdeen being the first club with a "casual" following and the established skinhead/punk hooligan elements from Airdrieonians, Hearts and Rangers that had dominated prior to this were then challenged by casual firms (or 'mobs' as they were more popularly known as in Scotland). Casual firms were attached to clubs such as St. Mirren (Love Street Division), Clyde (Shawfield Shed End Boys), Aberdeen (Aberdeen Soccer Casuals), Dundee and Dundee United (Dundee Utility), Hibernian (Capital City Service), Morton (Morton Soccer Crew), Motherwell (Saturday Service), Partick Thistle (North Glasgow Express), Falkirk (Fear) and Dunfermline Athletic (Carnegie Soccer Service). Aberdeen, under the name Aberdeen Soccer Casuals (ASC), becoming the best known.

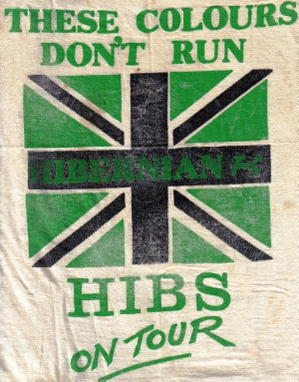
Hibernian firm t-shirt

From the 1980s onwards Aberdeen's ASC and Hibernian's 1983 CCS became the most feared casuals in Scotland, the CCS gaining particular notoriety. From the 2000s Hooliganism has declined in Scotland but Aberdeen, Dundee Utility, Celtic, Hibernian, Hearts, Motherwell, Partick Thistle, Airdrie, St. Mirren and Rangers still have a number of hooligans.

While the Scotland national team's travelling supporters, the Tartan Army, are generally not violent these days, hooliganism does occur in other areas of Scottish football. Pre-arranged fights between firms on match days mostly take place away from the football grounds. Most Scottish football fans are against this behaviour, and authorities have taken several measures to reduce football hooliganism.

Celtic and Rangers are the two biggest teams in Scotland, and the Old Firm rivalry is one of the most heated football rivalries in the world. The Old Firm rivalry is largely motivated by religious sectarianism, and is related to the conflict between Loyalists and Republicans in Northern Ireland. Rangers' hooligan element (the ICF) have a strong rivalry with Celtic's CSC and Aberdeen's ASC, with Celtic being their traditional cultural enemy. They have also had major clashes with Motherwell, Hibs, Partick Thistle and Dundee's Utility. At the 2008 UEFA Cup Final when Rangers reached the final, Rangers fans and the ICF rioted in Manchester with a huge media spotlight

The oldest rivalry in Scotland is between Hibernian and Heart of Midlothian and contained a sectarian hatred from the outset as Hibernian were initially an Irish Catholics only club and Hearts represented the Scottish Protestant establishment—however, this aspect of the rivalry is now almost non-existent. At the first-ever match between Heart of Midlothian and Hibernian on Christmas Day 1875 the Hibs fans chased the Hearts captain, Tom Purdie after allegations of foul play, and since then the rivalry escalated into more serious crowd trouble at virtually every game between them over the next 15 years. This continued as an issue between the clubs and the fans indefinitely.

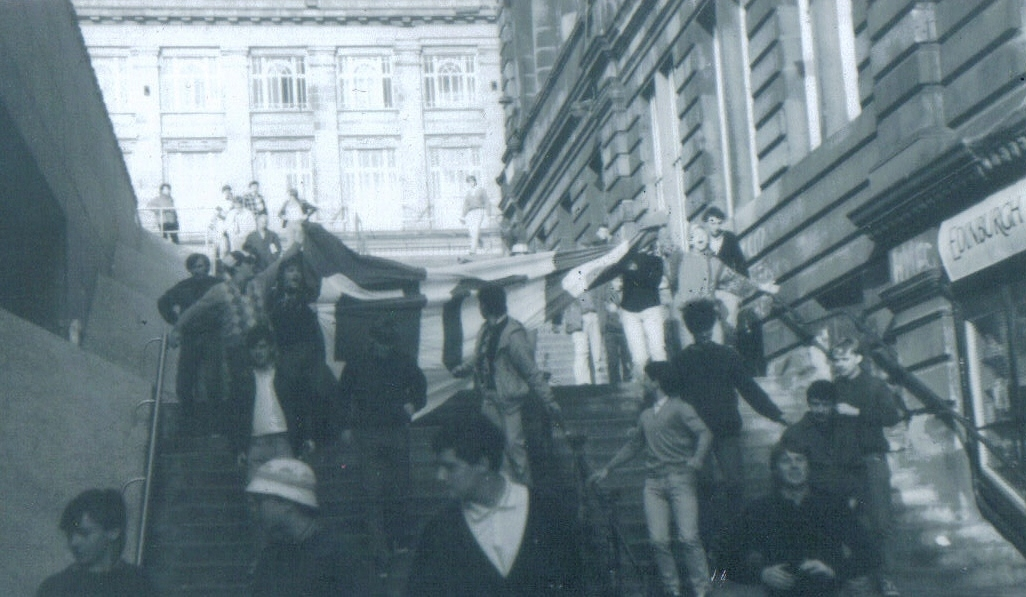
Hibernian supporters show their colours at Edinburgh Waverley railway station (1984)

In the 1980s and 1990s these Hibernian hooligans had documented clashes across the UK with various mobs including notorious hooligan followers from such teams as Aberdeen, Leeds United, Millwall and Chelsea. In European competition the CCS also had clashes with Belgian hooligans and local residents in 1989 and in 1992, in 2005 in Ukraine against FC Dnipro Dnipropetrovsk hooligans. The Hibernian CCS story has been told in books such as These Colours Don't Run and Hibs Boy, and online by former notable members. In Scotland, the CCS had a particular hatred towards Aberdeen's ASC, Rangers ICF, Hearts CSF, Falkirk's Fear and Airdrie's Section B.

During Euro '96, the CCS, along with Celtic's CSC, Dundee's Utility, Partick Thistle's NGE, Motherwell's SS, St. Mirren's LSD, and Aberdeen's ASC organised a well publicised fight against Chelsea, Millwall, Rangers, and Airdrie's Section B Hooligans in Trafalgar Square. The incident attracted worldwide media attention with footage of both sides attacking each other and police.

In the 2000s, Aberdeen Soccer Casuals (ASC) had clashes in England at Bradford and Hartlepool and also in Europe.

On 6 January 2007, when Motherwell came to Airdrie in the 2006–07 Scottish Cup, fighting broke out in the main street.

== Wales ==
Cardiff City's hooligan firm, the Soul Crew, has been involved in full-scale riots since the 1970s. In January 2002, Leeds United and Cardiff City fans, players, and Cardiff chairman Sam Hammam were hit by thrown objects during a game, while hundreds of Cardiff fans invaded the pitch after the final whistle to celebrate knocking the then leaders of the Premier League out of the FA Cup. The Cardiff City club were fined £40,000 by the Football Association of Wales for the events of that day. Hammam was criticised by the head of the English Police Spotting teams for encouraging the hooligans by saying before the game, "It's better for us to play them at Ninian because the intimidatory factor will be so big ... It's a bit like the old Den at Millwall except ten times more." Hammam at first blamed what he called a "racist English media" for exaggerating the trouble at the Leeds game, but he also launched "a war on hooliganism". In October 2004 a BBC report stated that Cardiff had more fans banned than any other Football League club, with 160 banning orders against its fans, showing a willingness to stamp out hooliganism.

Despite the club's historically small size, Wrexham Football Club has a significant football hooligan element known as the Frontline. It has been involved in riots with many firms in the UK, such as those of Chester City, Everton, and Port Vale.
