= Capital City Service =

Scottish football hooligan firm

- Founded: During 1983/84 football season
- Founding location: Edinburgh, Scotland
- Years active: 1984–present
- Membership (est.): recent times, up to 100; at peak, 600 (estimated)
- Criminal activities: Football hooliganism, breach of the peace, vandalism
- Rivals: Section B, Inter City Firm, Aberdeen Soccer Crew, Saturday Service, The Utility, Casual Soccer Firm

The Capital City Service (CCS) is a Scottish football hooligan firm associated with Hibernian F.C. and active from 1984 when the casual hooligan subculture took off in Scotland. Their roots were in the previous incarnations of hooligan groups attached to the club and also the wider Edinburgh and surrounding area's gang culture. They are more commonly known in the media and amongst the public as the Hibs Casuals, although within the hooligan network they may also be referred to as Hibs Boys.

Hooliganism was established at matches with many clubs in Scottish football before the advent of the casuals and violence from Hibernian supporters was recognised as likely to occur by other teams' hooligan supporters. The CCS went on to be regarded by some rivals and observers as the dominant hooligan gang in the Scottish scene from the latter part of the 1980s until the mid-1990s and also from outside Scotland as one of the best from north of the border.

During the latter part of the 1990s, a split in their ranks caused by the formation of a nationwide hooligan firm made up of casuals from different teams and a general decline in football hooliganism in Scotland saw activity of the gang diminish. However, by the early part of the next decade an apparent resurgence in football hooliganism at various clubs in Scotland was being observed by authorities and the CCS attached to Hibernian were involved

== Formation ==
In the early 1980s, Hibs away fixtures were regularly attended by fans travelling on supporters' buses from amongst areas in Edinburgh such as Leith, Niddrie, Tollcross and Granton. This afforded the opportunity for bonds to be forged through the shared experiences of following the team and responding to the actions of opposing fans. An away match in November 1983 against Airdrie resulted in a clash with the well-known local hooligans, Section B, which further strengthened these connections and helped bolster the young Hibs boys confidence into forming a casual-style hooligan firm. This new friendship of youths from different areas of the city was a contrast to the existing area gang ethos that had been a feature of the capital since the 1950s. The camaraderie branched out from match days as the gang members also hung about with each other during the week. Word soon got round and the basis of the first known unified Edinburgh gang was in place.

Edinburgh at that time had become known as the AIDS capital of Europe due to the rampant heroin use that existed there. Coupled with the ongoing poor economic climate throughout the country, for young men who wished to maintain pride in themselves as well as a sense of belonging to something the new casual hooligan culture was an alternative route to embark upon.

However, the congeniality was not a constant throughout the rest of the Hibs support who, in the main, still wore team colours at matches. Referred to as scarfers, or more playfully as cavemen by the Hibs boys, a popular chant at the time that was adopted by some Hibs scarfers was Oh it's magic, you know, Hi-bees and casuals don't go and this dislike between the CCS and other sections of the Hibs crowd was tangible at home matches.

A pivotal moment in this formative season was when the CCS encountered the leading casual gang at the time in Scotland - the Aberdeen Soccer Casuals - before a Hibernian v. Aberdeen game in Edinburgh. The two mobs clashed on Easter Road and after some fighting the CCS ran away, but one Hibs boy got severely beaten and was in a coma for a week. Rather than deter them, this near-tragedy emboldened the fledgling gang to continue with their efforts in being casual hooligans. At the next Hibs match, against local rivals Hearts at Tynecastle, the CCS fared a lot better when they came up against the notorious Gorgie Aggro. This also proved to be a turning point in the Edinburgh football hooligan scene.

== Structure within the gang ==
As the CCS evolved an informal hierarchy appeared but there was no singular leader or 'top boy' as was usual for other crews. Instead, a committee of five individuals who had garnered enough respect amongst their peers took to the task of planning and organising for the gang's activities at football. By the early to mid-1990s this system had expired and was replaced mainly by two protagonists who arranged most battles and who were also striving for control of the mob.

Membership wasn't even restricted to only Hibs fans. Over the years casuals from Hearts and sometimes Old Firm fans who lived in Edinburgh were integrated into the mob. These individuals usually had a more rigorous initiation than normal as asides from the reservations of some CCS members they also had to prove their worth against the team that they were originally associated with.

There was also the need initially for hooligans younger than ones in the main mob to form their own identifiable group and could also be managed and trained by older more experienced hooligans. In later times a type of apprenticeship scheme was used to enable the veterans in the CCS to select and mentor prospective younger hooligans. Eventually some offspring of Hibs casuals took to being the new younger additions to the Hibs mob. This father-to-son tradition also occurred with other mobs as was exampled in action when sons from the CCS and CSF were involved in an altercation outside an entertainment complex in Edinburgh.

The following is a list of elements of the CCS that are recognised internally by the gang as well as outside parties.

Blackleys Baby Crew (BBC) - Formed in 1985 mainly by the younger siblings and associates of the original members. Named after the manager of the football club at the time, John Blackley. This group was dissolved once its prolific members attained full acceptance by the main mob.

Lassie Soccer Trendies (LST) - Females who were either girlfriends or groupies of CCS members. The older or more male only gang purists amongst the CCS were often embarrassed by the existence of this set of wanna-be gang members. Despite these reservations this group flourished and was never really dropped completely until 1988, though by then the women involved in it had taken on a more jocular approach to what they had participated in.

The Family - In 1986 a hardcore section of the gang wanted to create a specific identity for the most dedicated and enthusiastic members. The nomenclature of CCS was felt by the participants to be the generic title for all casual hooligans who had attached themselves to Hibernian regardless of the individuals capabilities or reputation.

Hibs Baby Crew (HBC) - Circa 1987 the popularity of football hooliganism and of the CCS activities had attracted another set of young and eager recruits in much the same way as the previous baby crew. The dissolution of this group followed the same pattern as the BBC. By the early part of the 21st century there was a further wave of casual styled hooligans attached to Hibernian who had resurrected the moniker of the Hibs Baby Crew. This consisted of youths attracted to football hooliganism for similar reasons as their predecessors and quite often enough they could have been sons or nephews of older hooligans.

== Strategies and tactics ==
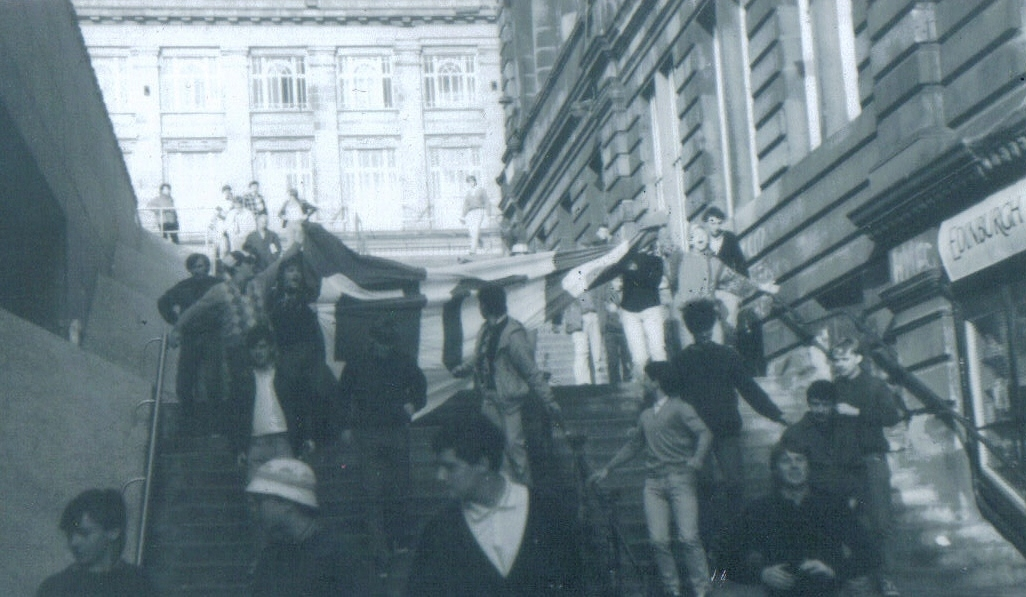
The CCS enters Waverley Station in 1984

A concerted effort was made to apply some strategic thinking to the CCS activity at the football. In readiness to face other hooligan gangs a formation was opted for that consisted of a front line of around twenty self-proclaimed "nutters" who initiated the confrontation with their rivals and directly behind them were other enthusiastic battle lines ready to support the attack.

Whenever possible they tried to ambush another crew and strike them at the weakest point which was usually in the middle of their mob, the perception being that this section contained few if any of their adversaries' more competent fighters. This tended to make an easier job of splitting up the other mob and dispatching their less robust members quickly. If the opposing gang were in a police escort then a group of Hibs boys made their way to the front of it while another group would hang around at the back. The bunch at the front would act as a decoy and start causing trouble in an attempt to lure all the police officers to rush in and assist their colleagues. This left the area at the back of the opposition firm open to attack by the expectant Hibs mob positioned there.

On match days in Edinburgh a favoured gathering place would be the Penny Black pub on West Register Street situated near to Waverley station just off the east end of Princes Street. This back-street public house, and the convenience of a café and betting office below it, kept the Hibs boys out of the eyes of police in the days before adequate CCTV coverage of the city centre. Members of the Baby Crew would be positioned with a line of sight on the exits from the station to enable them to determine what potential route visiting soccer crews would take and likely points where to confront the opposition. Likewise, after games had finished the city centre bars were sometimes used as the last opportunity to engage with their rivals as they made their way back to the railway station.

Nearer to the stadium the CCS would frequent pubs such as the Thistle Bar, Albion Bar and the Royal Nip, which was considered by many Hibs boys as their spiritual home. Often though the CCS would head to the Ladbrokes bookmakers that was situated on Easter Road at the junction with Bothwell Street to hang around the premises and wait for their moment of opportunity to take on other firms. It was here that visiting fans were finally marshalled away from the accessible public area and either directed to or escorted to their allocated section of the ground.

As the segregation techniques used by the police to escort fans to the game became more effective whenever the opportunity arose for the Hibs casuals they would enter into the section of the ground allocated for away fans. Often Hibs boys would leave the ground before the match had finished while avoiding police attention to try to position themselves better to launch attacks on the opposition. The pubs were usually closed on Easter Road at this time so the side streets that lead onto it or the cover of the bushes and trees on London Road Gardens would be used in attempts to initiate gang fights. It has also been known for Hibs boys to mooch around the A & E department of the Edinburgh hospital looking for their victims and associates from earlier on in the day.

For away matches the favoured mode of transport in the first few years was on the scheduled train services from either Waverley or Haymarket stations. Word of mouth was the usual method of relaying to gang members of the where and when to meet though in the 1984/85 season the section in the local evening paper put aside for football fans travelling into and out of Edinburgh was also used on occasion. In later seasons the information for the meeting point was often communicated by the use of party invitation cards that detailed the venue and time. The railway network provided convenient access to the requisite city or town centre and from there the CCS would walk to the football stadium regardless of distance. This would allow the Hibs boys to be on show for any rival crews along the way to have the opportunity to interact with them.

To try to overcome the hurdle of effective policing of football match days in other cities the idea came about of arriving early enough to avoid detection and the subsequent police escort. Within the space of a fortnight in December 1986 the Hibs casuals twice met and took early trains to their destination enabling them to arrive well before noon. This was early enough to catch the police off-guard in Aberdeen when they arrived at 10.30 a.m. but in Dundee two weeks later the police were soon alerted to their mid-morning arrival. Similarly, as with games at Easter Road the CCS would gain entry to the opposition's end whenever possible, although this time it meant entering the part of the ground designated for the home supporters, such as against Celtic and St. Mirren.

When the casual presence at Scottish football was eventually acknowledged by the authorities the hooligans travelling in this manner became easier targets for the police to intercept and contain. Sometimes it was necessary to make use of scheduled express coach service routes, hired coaches, rented or privately owned vehicles like cars, mini-buses and transit vans to circumvent anticipated police measures in place around main railway stations and city centres.

For some away fixtures it was important to carry out a pre-matchday recce at the football ground the game was to be played at in order to scheme for a specific ploy to be carried out successfully. This would entail attending a match between their future opponents and another club to be able to ascertain what options would be made available to them to enact their plan. At a game to be played at Ibrox in the late 1980s the idea was to smuggle in a set of pyrotechnics so the gang needed to know beforehand what the search procedure was likely to be. At a match at Parkhead the following season the Hibs boys were planning to attack the Celtic casuals inside the stadium so needed to be up to speed as to where the CSC assembled at that time. A friendly fixture against the south London side Millwall in 1990 threw up a completely new challenge of getting to know the lay-out of the area where the game was to be played, transport links and crucially, where the opposition mob's favoured pubs would be.

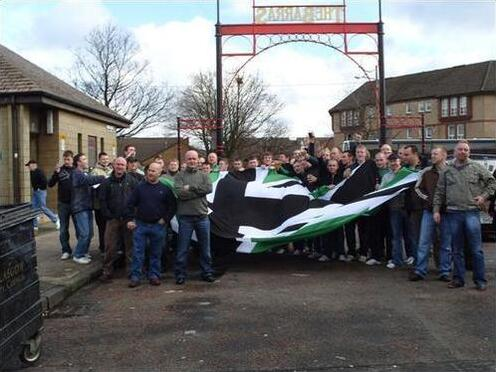
CCS in the Barras 2008

From the mid 1990s onwards police intelligence efforts and the effective use of closed-circuit television cameras impinged upon these methods of initiating gang fights so meetings via mobile phones became the preferred means to make arrangements with rival mobs. The internet has also claimed to have been utilised in such a way to co-ordinate football related disorder.

If practicable, the venue for the brawl to take place had to be sufficiently far away from the anticipated area of police surveillance on the day. For example, during the 1994/95 season, for a visit of Dundee hooligans, it was a public house in a quiet white collar part of the New Town area and against the Rangers mob it was at a suburban railway station in Slateford, which was regarded as deep within Hearts fans territory. For the 1996 Euro Championship game between England and Scotland a pub with a suitably sized car park for a mob fight was opted for in the London area of High Barnet, ten miles away from the usual battleground of Trafalgar Square. This mode of confrontation was still evident in 2011 for a match against Celtic in Edinburgh but with the added twist of taking place while the game was being played three miles away from the fight.

Another approach employed to evade police observation involved meeting representatives of an opposing gang the day before a match and showing them a route and pub to congregate in that could avoid CCTV detection. An illustration of this occurred prior to a pre-season friendly at Easter Road Stadium against Leeds United in 2004.

== Disorder at football ==
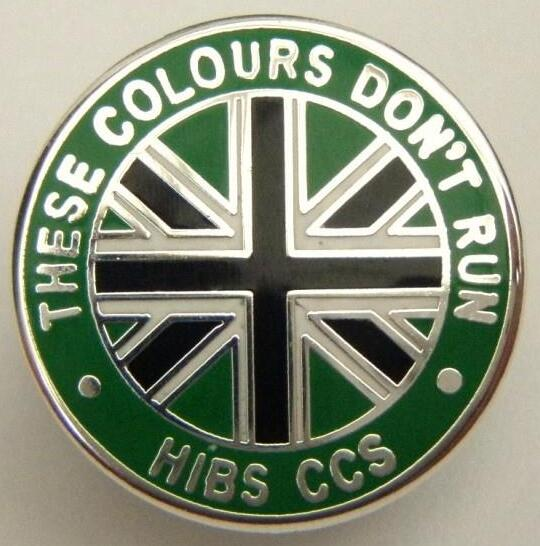
CSS pin badge

Against Rangers at Easter Road August 1985

The CCS has had clashes all across Scotland, England and Europe either when Hibernian or Scotland were playing or as invited guests of other English hooligan firms at various English league games. There have been instances of them making an appearance at Scottish or English club matches without the prior knowledge of the hooligan element of the teams playing each other that day.

Pre-season friendlies that were played against English clubs such as Newcastle United, Oldham Athletic, Burnley, Aston Villa, Millwall, Leeds United, Preston North End, Sunderland, Bolton Wanderers and Nottingham Forest have also led to hooligan incidents. One friendly at home that had been arranged with Chelsea in the early 1990s had potentially serious trouble averted by police action against a travelling group of well known Chelsea hooligans.

In the brief appearances the club has made in European competitions since the inception of the gang there has also been incidents of note against FC Liege, Anderlecht, Dnipro Dnipropetrovsk and Maribor.

For Scotland national team games they were most active when they played England on either side of the border but were also heavily involved for a match against the Netherlands in Utrecht in the mid-1990s.

=== Pre-season home ties ===
The first English mob that the CCS encountered was in August 1984 when Newcastle United were invited to play Hibernian, though it was as part of a larger group of Hibs hooligans who were mainly skinheads when the thugs from both clubs clashed on London Road after the game.

Hibernian twice played Chelsea, the first game was in August 1986 but yielded nothing in terms of football violence. The second fixture in August 1991 had potentially serious trouble averted when a group of known Chelsea Headhunters being tracked by an intelligence lead police operation were apprehended on the outskirts of Edinburgh. Three mini-buses were stopped and searched which revealed that hidden behind the panelling were baseball bats, distress flares, smoke grenades, ammonia filled plastic lemons, knives and Headhunter calling cards. The Chelsea boys plan was to meet up with hooligans from Hearts and Rangers to take on the CCS.

Leeds United also played two friendly matches at Easter Road. In August 1993 police resources were stretched as there were running battles between the gangs before and after the game near to pubs in the High Street and Rose Street area as well as vicious fighting outside Waverley station where a Leeds boy suffered serious head injuries. For the next meeting in July 2004 the day before the match was due to be played Hibs boys rendezvoused with a couple of Leeds hooligans and took them to a pub near Meadowbank stadium called the Hop, Step and Jump which was intended to be used by the Leeds mob and then showed them the nearby Loch Inn which was designated for the CCS. There were no CCTV cameras covering this area and the intention was to use these two pubs on the day in order to set about each other without readily alerting the police. However, the next day Leeds boys declined the invitation and instead met up with some Hearts casuals for a drink in the Standing Order bar on George Street. The only fighting that occurred before the match between the CCS and the Leeds Service Crew was a brief skirmish on Easter Road. As Leeds lads started to leave the ground from half-time onwards there were a few more scuffles between small groups of each mob and near to Waverley station some Hibs boys were seen carrying knives

Another team to play twice at Easter Road was Sunderland. The initial game was played in July 2003 and there was a fight outside the Balmoral Hotel on the North Bridge between the CCS and Sunderland boys who apparently had the numerical advantage. When the teams met again in August 2011 there were running battles on Easter Road between the Hibs boys and Sunderland casuals before and after the game resulting in two men from Sunderland being seriously injured. One eyewitness claimed that it was a nightmare of football violence and it was believed that this was a continuation of events from when the teams played each other in 2003. The Hibs mob were being blamed for instigating the violence and "looking for fans to hurt".

A game was scheduled to be played against Barnsley in July 2011 but was postponed late in the day due to a waterlogged pitch. By 3 p.m. some Hibs boys attacked a group of Barnsley fans who were drinking in Lloyds No.1 bar at the Omni Centre.

=== Pre-season awaydays ===
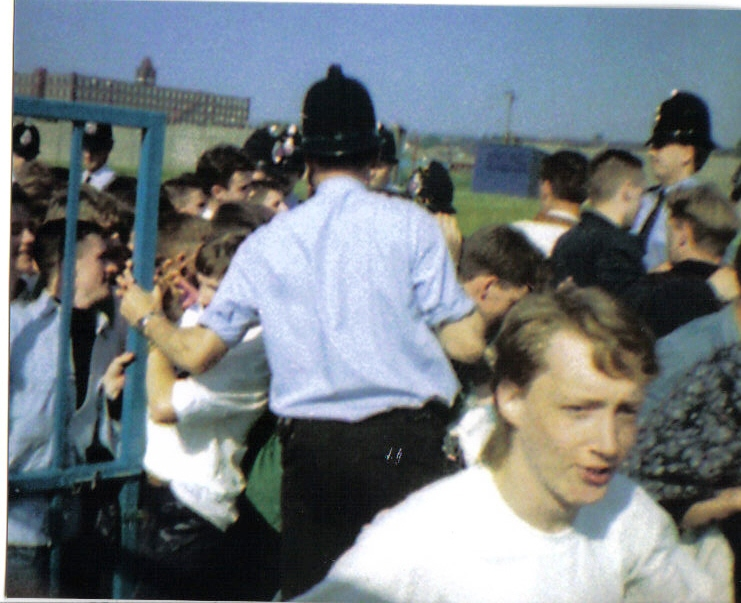
CCS leaving the terracing pen at Boundary Park August 1988

In August 1988 Hibernian played Oldham Athletic at Boundary Park and the majority of the CCS made their way there by train whilst the HBC hired a coach with the intention that they all meet up in Oldham. As the train crew arrived in Manchester they were met by two of Oldham's Fine Young Casuals who asked them if they would like to take on a mob of Manchester City hooligans who were in a pub, the Brunswick Cellar, close to the Manchester Arndale. The Hibs boys duly obliged and after attacking the Manchester City boys and wrecking the bar there were further street battles as more Manchester lads appeared on the scene.

Whilst all this was happening the HBC had arrived in Oldham and ended up fighting with the FYC mob that proved to be too strong for the Hibs youngsters. The Oldham boys thought that was it for the day until the remainder of the CCS turned up belatedly due to their earlier exertions. When it was discovered what had happened prior to their arrival the Hibs mob anger was tangible enough for the police to attempt to contain them within the away terracing. This section of the ground was enclosed by a series of metal pens and the police tried to lock the gates on them but were met by resistance from the Hibs boys throughout the game. Eventually the police abandoned this plan and then relied upon securing the huge wooden gates at the perimeter of the stadium. Even this didn't stop the rampant CCS who after the final whistle managed to crash open this last obstacle between them and the FYC. The raging Hibs mob quickly overcame the police lines outside the ground and steamed into Oldham's mob.

The following year Hibernian played three games in a week from the end of July until early August, Hull City at Boothferry Park, Burnley at Turf Moor and Aston Villa at Villa Park.

For the match in Hull fourteen CCS made the trip in two hired transit vans. At the game they went into the home end of the ground and after decking someone who was wearing a Hearts strip they fought with Hull boys before being escorted by the police into the away end.

Before the next game at Burnley another transit van full of Hibs boys arrived and they all met up in a pub in the town centre. Their presence there soon attracted the Burnley mobs attention and eventually both gangs fought a pitched battle in the pedestrian precinct outside the pub. A hotel adjacent to this pub was the accommodation being used by the Hibernian team and some players were hanging out the windows watching the gangs fight. Outside the ground after the game the police kept most of the Burnley mob at bay whilst the Hibs boys made an attempt to break through the police lines. A breakaway group of Burnley lads had made their way to a lane behind the Hibs casuals and it was there that the two mobs finally clashed.

The Aston Villa game was played on the Saturday and a fleet of mini-buses and cars brought more Hibs boys down south and they all met up at Hilton Park services before travelling onto Birmingham to meet up with the remainder of the CCS contingent who were arriving at New Street railway station. When the Hibs mob exited the ground after the match they saw the Villa crew outside the main stand and attacked them resulting in the Villa boys running back into the stadium. Later on in Birmingham city centre some Hibs casuals clashed with an ice-hockey team exiting from an ice-rink. During this street fight one Hibs boy was randomingly stabbing people with a hypodermic needle whilst informing them that he was an Edinburgh junkie and that they had now contracted AIDS.

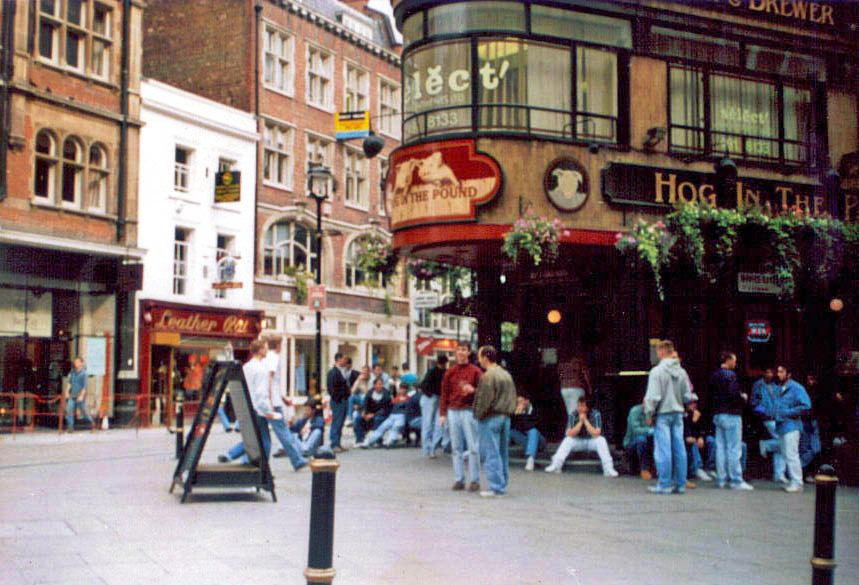
Hibs boys at the Hog in the Pound pub in London August 1990

In August 1990 there was one fixture that really captured the attention of the CCS, a game against Millwall at The Den. All the Hibs mob excitement was tempered somewhat when an hour before they were due to depart the Edinburgh police appeared at the pub and instructed the drivers of the hired coaches that the trip was cancelled. Not to be outdone the Hibs boys who could manage it made their own way to London in a trains, planes and automobiles type operation and met up in a pub off Oxford Street called the Hog in the Pound. They made their way to the game via the Tube and alighted at New Cross where some plainclothes police stepped in and made arrests. As the CCS approached the Crown & Anchor pub on New Cross Road they encountered some of Millwalls mob and fighting broke out. Hibs boys started to smash the windows of the pub, wreck the vehicles in the car park with one of them being overturned causing car alarms to go off and also vandalise some wooden fencing in order to make weapons. This chaos lasted for approximately five minutes before the police arrived to contain matters and arrest more of the Hibs casuals as the remainder of the mob headed towards the ground. Outside the away end as more Hibs boys arrived by taxi a mob of Millwall thugs turned up and there was a further pitched battle between both sets of hooligans, with a plainclothes Edinburgh policeman getting caught up in the rammy. After the match a robust police escort took the CCS to the nearest Tube station whilst managing to hold off any reciprocal attacks from the enraged Millwall boys. In the following weeks Evening Standard a message appeared in the classified section, "Congratulations Hibs on a job well done – West Ham ICF".

Even when a match was played against Telford United of the Conference League in July 1998 the Hibs boys still took a mob down in a mini-bus and a handful of cars. After kicking in a fire-exit door and gaining free admission into the Bucks Head stadium they took up a position behind one of the goals which was used by home supporters and they were soon embroiled in a terracing battle with Telford boys. During the game the Hibs casuals were told that one of their boys who hadn't made it into the game had been stabbed so they left the ground immediately. Upon reaching the town centre it transpired that there had been no knife injury but in fact four Hibs boys had been beaten severely by a group of Telford hooligans. There were further clashes between the mobs as the CCS sought revenge.

Preston were Hibernians opponents at Deepdale in July 2003 and the CCS arrived with an impressive mob that was enough to deter their hosts from making an appearance. After the game, a small group of Hibs boys fought with Preston's mob in the market area.

Hibernian returned to Greater Manchester in August 2009 this time to play Bolton Wanderers at the Reebok Stadium and before the match the Hibs mob, who had some of Oldham's firm the FYC with them as guests, which was in the Market Street Tavern in Kearsley was large enough to deter the Bolton hooligans from taking them on directly. Though some of Bolton's crew, the Cuckoo Boys, waited until the match had started then slashed the tyres on a mini-bus and smashed the windows of a coach that had been used by the CCS that day. There was chanting during the second half of the match that was deemed offensive enough to have some Hibs boys ejected from the stadium. Shortly after this the CCS fought with the Bolton hooligans in the Middlebrook retail park next to the Reebok, in what was described as a mini-riot windows were also smashed and mounted officers with riot police arrived to restore order. There was a further disturbance near to Kearsley station outside the Hare and Hounds pub when Hibs boys returning to their vehicles fought with more of Bolton's mob who had turned up in taxis to confront them. Again it took the arrival of police officers in riot gear before the situation was brought under control. The Bolton crew went to the Market Street Tavern and there was a further minor incident when a car-load of Hibs boys arrived at the premises where a brief skirmish took place.

The final match of a southern European tour in July 2013 saw Hibernian play Nottingham Forest in the Portuguese town of Vila Real de Santo António at the Estadio Municipal. An explicit Scottish/English hostility was present between both sets of supporters inside the stadium and nationalistic chanting created an unpleasant atmosphere. The temporary barrier that split the stand was the flash point area between Hibs boys and Forest fans shortly before half-time and as the over zealous local police tried to control this their baton wielding tactics merely exacerbated the situation. The barrier was broken up between the warring factions and used as weaponry and it took the arrival of the riot police who were even more unrelenting with their batons to finally calm things down.

=== Aberdeen ===
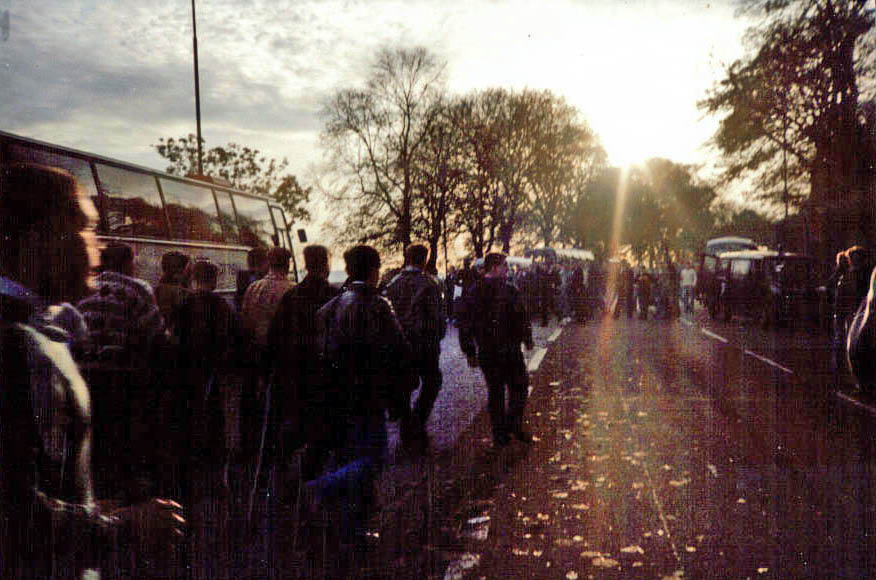
CCS in the foreground about to confront ASC on Regent Road Edinburgh in the 1980s

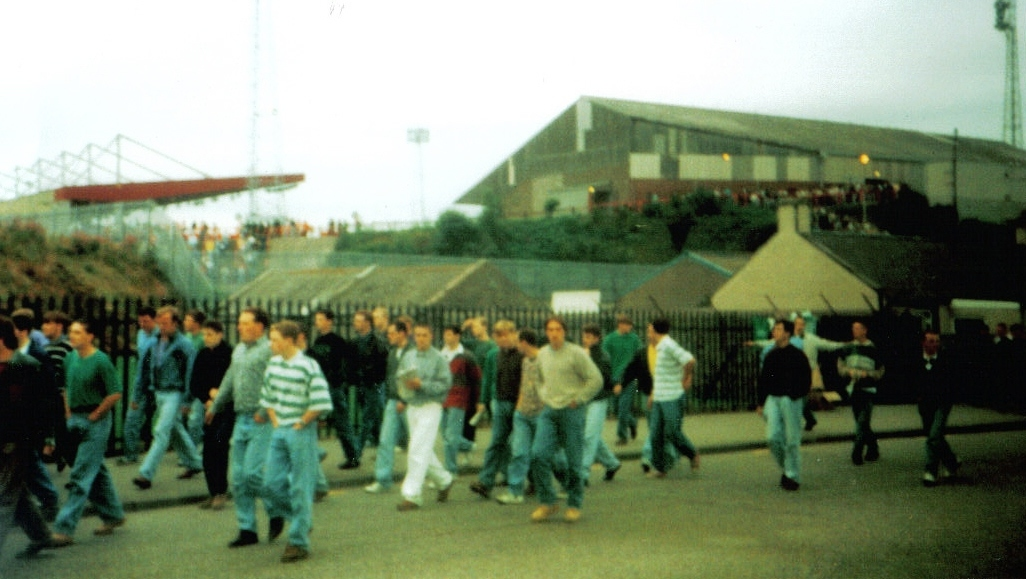
CCS at Pittodrie stadium in the early 1990s

From the outset their foremost casual adversaries were the Aberdeen Soccer Casuals, who were the leading hooligan gang in Scotland at the time, so the main ambition within the Hibs crew was to take on their northern rivals, defeat them and therefore ascend to the ephemeral position of being the number one mob in Scotland.

There was a couple of tentative clashes during their preliminary encounters of the 1984/85 season around a game postponed due to inclement weather and its mid-week replay and the CCS even attempted to take on the ASC at other matches where Hibernian were not Aberdeen's opponents. Aberdeen were due to play Raith Rovers in a Scottish Cup match at Starks Park in February 1985. the CCS then took the somewhat foolhardy decision, considering the difference in experience and sizes of the two mobs, to attend. Their plan was to enter the ground and try to launch a surprise attack on the ASC though this was foiled when the Aberdeen boys spotted them as they made their way to the game and subsequently it was the Hibs casuals who were attacked on the terracing, After being escorted away and onto the train by the police the Hibs boys Parthian shot of the day was to pull the emergency cord as the train was about to pass the stadium and then launch bottles onto the Aberdeen mob still watching the game.

So it was a determined crew of Aberdeen casuals that made its way to Edinburgh in March, for the last game against Hibs of that season, who had firmly in their minds the idea that nothing less than a result against the CCS would do. As the mobs approached each other on Easter Road there was some missile throwing between them and a few frontline skirmishes before the numerical advantage of the ASC was enforced and the CCS ran away. Unfortunately as one of the Hibs boys threw a traffic cone and then tried to run he fell to the ground either by being tripped up or by stumbling on some debris that littered the road. He was then set upon by the Aberdeen mob and kicked and punched so severely, especially by blows to the head, he had to be taken to the intensive care unit where he was in a coma for a week before regaining consciousness. During half-time the rumour spread amongst the CCS and then onto the rest of the Hibs support that he had died and the atmosphere rapidly turned poisonous. The Aberdeen section of the ground came under a hail of missiles from the Hibs casuals and Hibs scarfers then the Aberdeen players were also attacked in the same manner, eventually when a linesman was struck on the head the referee stopped the game until the police restored order. He was quoted as saying the scenes in the ground were the worst he'd ever witnessed. After the match had finished, a huge police presence ensured that no further clashes took place despite the efforts of the Hibs mob to seek revenge.

To further humiliate the Hibs crew the Aberdeen lads had devised a chant taken from a pop song in the charts at the time, "99 Red Balloons" by Nena, and adapted it to mock the near killing of the Hibs boy. The events of that day seemed to be what cemented an intense rivalry between the hooligan gangs and there were incidents at almost every fixture between them for a number of years after.

In Edinburgh asides from the frequent street battles that occurred between the gangs the CCS on separate occasions threw a petrol bomb, fired a shipping-distress flare, vandalised mini-buses and smashed the windows of a coach that had been hired by the ASC, stabbed an Aberdeen casual, went into the Aberdeen section of the ground to attack them, ambushed the Aberdeen mob whilst it was in a police escort on London Road and before another match when the ASC exited Haymarket station.

At matches played in Aberdeen amongst the various mob clashes there was one of the ASC slashed with a Stanley knife whilst before another fixture an Aberdeen boy was stabbed, also a pub that contained a mob of ASC had its windows smashed by Hibs boys trying to entice them outside. The Aberdeen boys managed to return the compliment one day of having their hired vehicles vandalised by way of attacking a mini-bus full of Hibs casuals and smashing it up on Union Street.

In 1986 the clubs also played each other in Dundee for a Scottish Cup semi-final match and there were assorted running battles throughout the city between fragmented groups of CCS and ASC.

By 1994 media attention was vigorously highlighting the casual hooligan element within Scottish football and it coincided with more pro-active police measures to prevent violence between the Aberdeen and Hibernian mobs. This included twice stopping and detaining coach loads of Aberdeen casuals on their way to Easter Road as well as on one occasion rounding up a bar full of Hibs boys in Edinburgh and keeping them locked up until the match that day had finished. This appears to have been an effective strategy as the scale of the violence between the two gangs ceased thereafter.

=== Heart of Midlothian ===
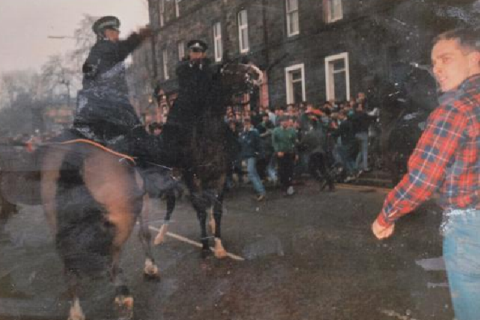
CCS outside Green Tree pub on Gorgie Road 1980s

The initial confrontations the CCS had with their city rivals was with the pre-casual era gangs of the Gorgie Aggro and Hearts Service Crew as the Hearts casual mob, the Casual Soccer Firm, didn't evolve as effectively as the Hibs boys and weren't much of an opposition at first. The battles with the scarfers lasted until April 1985 when they were decidedly routed by the CCS after a match at Tynecastle and this effectively ended their tenure as one of Scotland's notorious hooligan gangs. Now the focus of the Hibs casuals was firmly on the CSF and during the summer of that year there was continual gang fights between them

During the latter half of the 1980s the Wimpy burger bar on the junction of Princes Street and Castle Street provided a suitable hang out for the perennial presence of the Hibs casuals on the main thoroughfare in the city. Mainly in attendance were the BBC, who were known to be there from mid-morning until midnight, and by the evening a mob of around 50-60 CCS could gather there.

Frequently in the evening after the game had finished at either of the football grounds or sometimes even if they had not played each other that day, the two mobs would clash at pubs in the Haymarket, Gorgie Road or Lothian Road areas of the city. In the late 1980s the Hearts player Gary MacKay ran a pub in Morrison Street and it was regularly a target of the Hibs casuals.

=== European competition ===
In 1989 Hibernian played in a European football competition for the first time in eleven years. It was CSS's first foray into hooliganism on the continental stage. In the first round of the UEFA Cup Hibernian played Videoton of Hungary, and even though some Hibs casuals travelled for the away game there were no hooligan incidents reported in what was still an Eastern Bloc communist controlled state. The highlight of the trip was when the Hibs boys handed out 'These Colours Don't Run' T-shirts to the Hibernian team although much to the annoyance of one well-known player who missed out as there wasn't enough to go round.

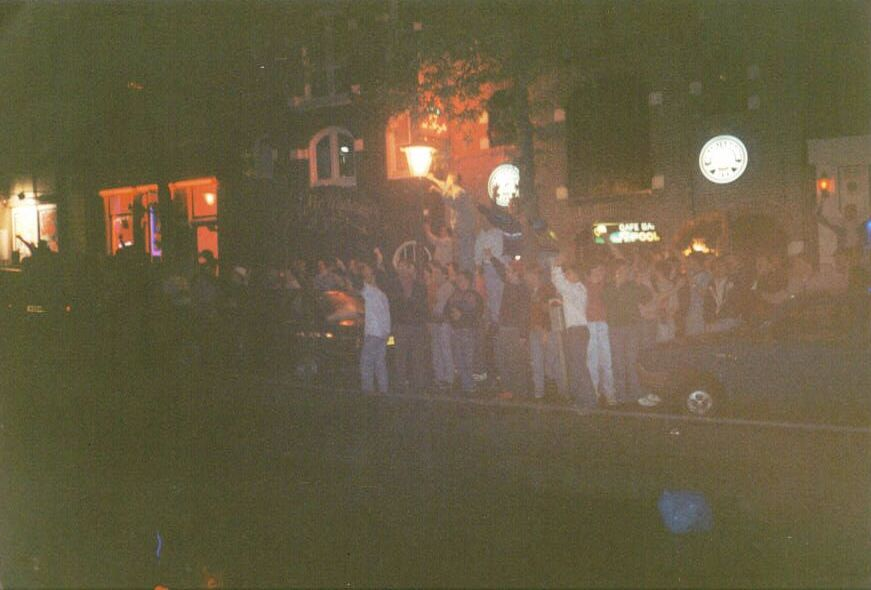
CCS in Brussels October 1989 the night before the game in Liege

The second round match against FC Liege was much more eventful both in Brussels and Liege. The Hibs mob based themselves in the Belgian capital and the night before the game they were embroiled in various running battles in and near to the Grand-Place with an assortment of foes; bikers, mods, Anderlecht boys and a more violent evenly-sided rammy with local Maghrebis. This armed battle resulted in stab and slash wounds to both parties and was halted when police arrived who quickly turned their attention on the Hibs boys, liberally brandishing their guns and striking a couple of the Hibs casuals with them. More than 50 CCS were handcuffed with plastic ties and detained overnight in police cells.

The next day in Liege after the game whilst being escorted by a sizeable police presence the Hibs boys noticed a large group of people hanging around at the bottom of the road. When one of the casuals asked a police officer who they were the Hibs mob were warned by the police that it was Liege hooligans and it was best to avoid going near them. This information had the opposite effect on the CCS as they broke through the police lines and engaged in a street battle with the Liege boys. That night in Brussels some Hibs boys went on a looting spree by smashing shop windows and stealing the goods on display, though one of them was nearly apprehended when the police noticed him walking around the city centre with a mannequin under his arm still clad in the leather jacket he coveted.

Whilst aboard the boat train from Dover to London Victoria as the Hibs mob were making their way back to Scotland one carriage was ruthlessly vandalised with seats being ripped out and hurled through windows to break them, toilet areas smashed up and other passengers put into a state of fear.

Hibernian returned to European competition three years later and was again drawn against a Belgian club, this time it was Anderlecht in the first round of the UEFA Cup so another trip to Brussels was planned by the CCS. The majority of the Hibs boys travelled via Amsterdam ostensibly to take on Rangers fans who had been harassing Hibs scarfers. There was some resistance from police and ferry officials in Harwich that resulted in the Hibs mob taking a detour to Dover though upon their arrival in Ostend Belgian police were again unrelenting in their use of batons and display of guns. In the capital of the Netherlands the Hibs mob were soon on the prowl looking for the Rangers fans and as well as dishing out beatings the CCS wrecked a bar and one Rangers fan jumped into a filthy detritus filled canal rather than suffer at the hands of the revenge seeking Hibs mob. The Dutch police also sought retribution by assaulting a couple of the Hibs casuals on the street and then visiting the accommodation that was being used by the CCS and telling them in no uncertain terms to leave for Belgium the next day.

Brussels Grand-Place was the main congregation point and as with the previous trip there were clashes with Anderlecht boys and Maghrebis in and around this locale. As the atmosphere got rowdier in the square a police captain tried to address the crowd with his loud-hailer but this was rapidly taken from him by some Hibs boys who started chanting ‘CCS, CCS’ through it much to the delight of the rest of the mob. It was rumoured that the previous evening a couple of Hibs fans had been stabbed by Maghrebis so a small group of Hibs casuals slipped out of the intended police escort to the match and boarded a Metro train, then after smashing its windows they exited into the mainly Arabic immigrant area near to the stadium. A major confrontation evolved after some more drunken Hibs boys trashed a shop display stand and fought with the stores occupants as an enraged local populace mobbed up with knives, machetes and other weapons also took on the Hibs mob. In the melee that followed a Hibs casual got his throat brutally slashed and the CCS ran towards the Metro station where the fighting continued onto the train platform.

Near to the stadium the CCS clashed with some of Anderlechts mob outside a bar and then attempted to coax another bar full of Anderlecht boys onto the street. The police broke all this up by firing CS gas into the Hibs mob and making a mass arrest. Inside the stadium the Hibs boys attempted to rip down the perimeter and segregation fences to get at Anderlechts mob which resulted in the police baton charging them. During the game as Anderlecht boys were taunting their Hibs adversaries the CCS starting ripping out the seats and throwing them towards the Belgians, as the police arrived there was another terrace battle between them and the Hibs casuals. When the match ended the Hibernian team approached the away end to raise the flags and banners brought by the fans as a sign of their appreciation. One set of players innocently hoisted the CCS flag but upon realising what section of the Hibs fans it belonged to they dropped it immediately, whilst one of the players picked it up and returned it to its owners who were again in the process of trying to rip down the perimeter fence. Later in Grand-Place there were a series of skirmishes between the CCS and mobs of Maghrebis which kept the police force busy most of the night. At Ostend ferry port the next day the Belgian police gleefully informed the departing Hibs mob about the boy who'd had his throat slashed that "Your friend is dead", thankfully this turned out not to be true.

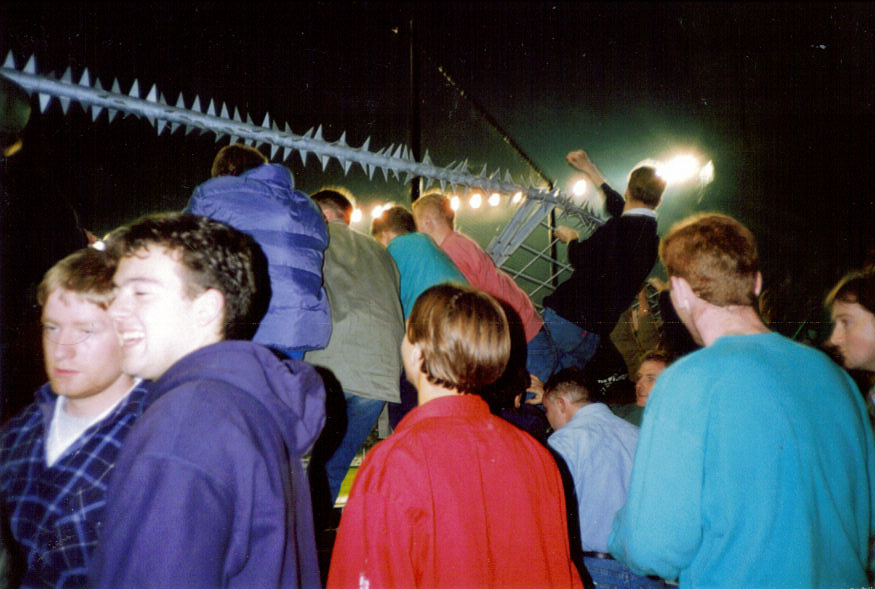
Hibs boys inside Anderlechts stadium

It wasn't until the first round of the UEFA Cup in 2005 when Hibernian played Dnipro Dnipropetrovsk in Ukraine before another instance of continental football violence occurred when the CCS fought battles with Dnipro hooligans prior to the match taking place. A bar containing Hibs fans was also attacked by Ukrainian thugs using smoke canisters.

European hooligans turned up on the streets of Edinburgh in 2010 for a Europa League third round qualifying match between Hibernian and NK Maribor from Slovenia. On the evening of the game an hour before kick-off there was a street brawl on the Canongate near to the Pancho Villa restaurant between the CCS and Maribor hooligans. As the fighting spread all over the road plant pots, café table and chairs, bottles, bricks even a newspaper stand were being used as weapons or being thrown whilst some thugs took off their belts and tried to strike people with the buckle end. The Scottish police in an apparent resemblance of Belgian police tactics arrested only a mass group of visiting thugs from Slovenia.

=== The Auld Enemy ===
In the latter half of the 1980s the national teams met each other in the Rous Cup and for the May 1987 fixture to be played at Hampden Park there was trouble in Edinburgh on the morning of the game in the vicinity of Waverley station between Hibs boys and English supporters. The CCS agreed with the ASC to a truce on the day of the game and they met up with each other beforehand in George Square, Glasgow where they fought with a mob of England hooligans. Later on in the city there were further battles with other English firms that included lads from Manchester City. In Edinburgh after the match Hibs boys clashed on Princes Street with thugs from Newcastle United.

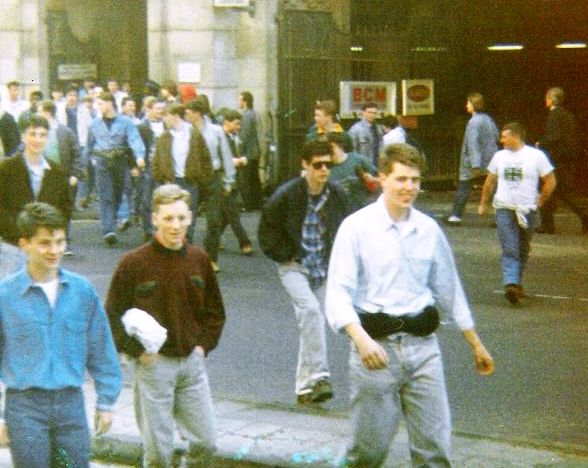
CCS exiting Kings Cross Station May 1988

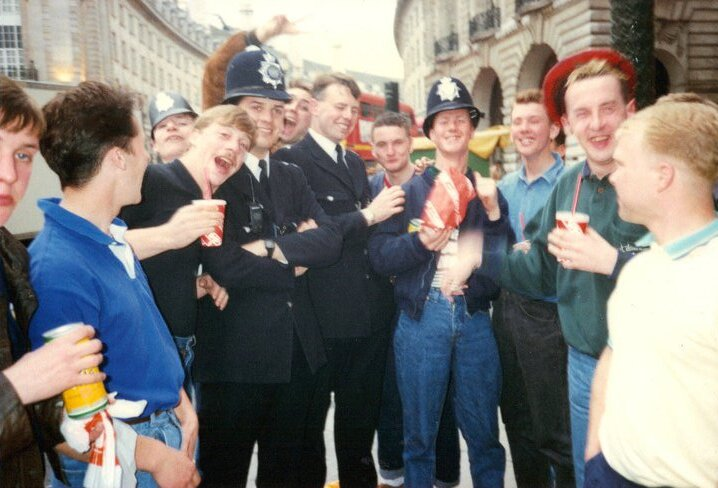
Hibs boys have a laugh with police in Trafalgar Square

The following year the match was to be played at Wembley Stadium and avoiding the large police presence at Trafalgar Square on the day of the match the CCS set off on a search for opposition firms to fight. At Euston railway station outside the main entrance they spotted a crew of English hooligans and the Hibs boys wasted no time in setting about them. The Hibs mob then made their way to the Soho area where they attacked a pub containing English lads with a minor street battle breaking out. In Leicester square a gang of Hibs casuals encountered an English firm made up of Chelsea Headhunters and other thugs from northern England and again the CCS steamed in. The ensuing pitched battle was an unexpected site for the tourists in one of London's famous thoroughfares as they observed the hooligan chaos of mob violence, people being decked, a series of fight and flight responses and then the English lads applauding themselves.

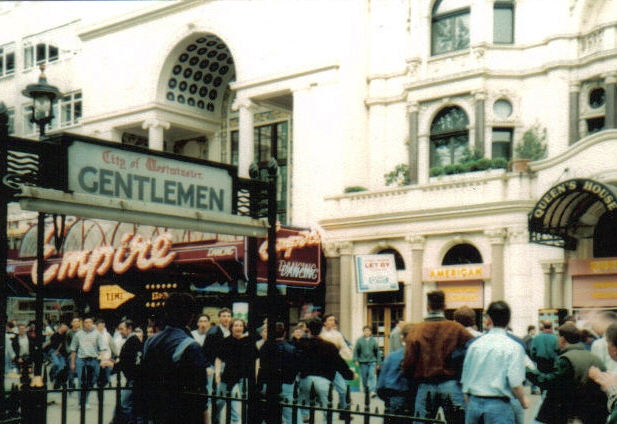
CCS clash with Headhunters in Leicester Square

Upon exiting Wembley Way tube station the Hibs casuals clashed with hooligans from Leeds United and the hostilities resumed inside the stadium in sections N and O. The fighting initiated in the upper tier between some CCS and their English counterparts and as the police restored order here the section below this saw battling recommence as casuals from Hibs and other Scottish clubs took on the English crews. This prompted the Hibs boys to drop down and join in with their compatriots in the melee. As the police intervened and made arrests some Hibs boys fought with them on the trackside of the pitch in attempts to rescue members of their crew. After the game there was a brief skirmish between thugs from both countries in a car-park near to the ground and Hibs boys coming to the rescue of some Tartan Army in central London by attacking a group of Portsmouth 6:57 Crew.

On the Saturday morning of the 1989 tie that was to be held in Glasgow the CCS were anticipating the arrival in Edinburgh of a contingent of English hooligans from clubs such as Sunderland, Middlesbrough and Leeds and had positioned themselves near to Waverley station. After all their foes had exited the station, the Hibs crew attacked them causing the English mob to split in two. As one group continued to fight it out on Princes Street much to the alarm of shoppers, halting traffic and causing shops to lock their doors a further running battle took place on St. Andrews Square.

It wasn't only the Hibs boys who were expecting the opposition to appear as the Scottish police had received intelligence reports from various English constabularies of the likelihood of English hooligans travelling to Edinburgh to fight with the CCS as had been the case two years earlier.

The British Transport Police based in Edinburgh passed onto their colleagues in the Strathclyde region that a large gang of Hibs Casuals who had been involved in disturbances that morning were making their way to Glasgow Queen Street on the 12.30 train. Around the same time the Lothian & Borders police force also relayed details through that two well known Hibs boys were travelling via a silver coloured Ford Sierra and that in view of their intelligence reports of the gang they suspected that this vehicle was being used to transport weapons to be used by the CCS that day.

The Hibs mob made their way to Glasgow and as on the previous occasion they met up with the ASC on George Square and agreed to an alliance for the day. They fought with English thugs on Victoria Road as the Scottish casuals firstly broke through the police line surrounding them then burst through the police cordon that had corralled the English near to a petrol station where the two mobs fought a frenetic street battle. This disorder disrupted the police control of the situation and the opposing gangs slipped away from their respective escorts. A public house that the English plotted in was soon discovered by Hibs boys and its windows were smashed forcing the tooled up English yobs to take to the streets. The mob fighting recommenced with vigour that progressed into running battles and missiles being thrown the rest of the way along the road as all and sundry were dragged into the bedlam while the road was closed by the police due to it being too unsafe for traffic to enter. The mêlée continued all the way onto the red-blaes pitches near Hampden Park and the red dust was soon swirling around getting into the mouths and covering the clothes of the combatants.

Here the police finally managed to restore order and escorted the mobs to the stadium where both gangs had tickets for the same section. The violence erupted once again at the bottom of the terracing as the Hibs and Aberdeen boys set about their task once again while the police resorted to climbing over the perimeter fence in order to intervene and they eventually managed to keep the rivals apart for the remainder of the match. After the game the CCS clashed with English hooligans near to Mount Florida station and also on Jamaica Street Bridge.

There had been 260 arrests in Glasgow that day, 100 English and 160 Scots, and 200 football related injuries dealt with in Glasgow hospitals. There was further calls for the fixture to be scrapped as well as questions raised in the House of Commons over the level of violence.

=== Dutch times ===
A challenge match had been arranged between Scotland and the Netherlands to be played at Utrecht in May 1994. A pre-arranged fight had been organised between Dutch and Scottish hooligans so the CCS, ASC and Utility casuals all agreed a truce for this fixture. The Scottish crew met up in the Grasshopper coffee shop in Amsterdam and travelled to the game in Utrecht by train where they were met by armed Dutch police with dogs lining the station platform. The police had ordered the train doors not to be opened but this didn't stop the Hibs boys from forcing them open and the Scottish mob exiting the train. There was clashes with police on the platform as one officer reached for his gun and he was attacked by two Hibs boys whilst several other Hibs casuals came to the rescue of one of their mob who had been handcuffed. Eventually the Scotland mob left the station and had a brief skirmish with the Dutch boys in Utrecht's main square as well as scuffles outside the stadium.

When the police arrived on the scene a few Dundee boys sought refuge in a local bar and to their surprise the handcuffed Hibs boy from the station also made an appearance after the successful rescue attempt. They all settled down to have a beer or two but it shortly became apparent that there was a chance of being arrested so they took a taxi to Amsterdam. Whilst there they tried to convince several shop keepers to sell them a hacksaw as their friend had been a victim of a stag-do prank but to no avail. The local police were soon on their trail and despite the Hibs boys' attempt to escape them he was arrested.

A police spokesman later said there was more trouble involving casuals during the game and the SFA's security adviser, Mr David McLaren, commented that it was the first time there had been trouble at a Scotland game outside of the UK.

=== Collaborations with other football hooligan gangs ===
In the 1984/85 season during the growth of the casual phenomenon the desire to fight against the ASC meant some CCS appeared at other Scottish clubs' games against Aberdeen.

A Motherwell boy who attended a Hibernian match in Glasgow that season was pulled up in the crowd by Hibs casuals, which lead to an accepted friendship regarding the casual scene as primarily both clubs were in separate leagues that season. A few SS also made trips through to Edinburgh for nights out with their new Hibs pals and even turned up once for a match between Hibernian and Aberdeen. In the December some Hibs boys met up with Motherwell's SS when the Lanarkshire club were in Edinburgh playing Meadowbank Thistle and Aberdeen were playing Hearts at Tynecastle and they were involved in fights with the ASC at Waverley station. Normal hostilities arose between the two gangs the following season

In the same season there was even a dalliance with arch-rivals Hearts fledgling crew the CSF on two occasions that Aberdeen were in town for Scottish cup games. The first was against Hearts and as the ASC walked from Waverley station to Gorgie Road there were a few skirmishes between them and Hibs boys. A number of the CCS had decided to put aside their antipathy for their city rivals that day and attended the match in order to fight with the Aberdeen boys and not with the CSF. After the game at the junction of Mcleod Street and Gorgie Road the Aberdeen crew burst through their police escort and clashed with the mixed mob of Edinburgh casuals that also included Hearts scarfer thugs. Aberdeen were next in Scotland's capital for cup duty in April 1985, again played at Tynecastle but the opponents this time were Dundee United. A delegation of Hibs casuals once more entered into a truce with Hearts boys to take on ASC together but things didn't work out as planned and the Hibs boys accused the CSF of "bottling it". An open letter was created by the CCS renouncing the Hearts mob, dubbing them the Casual Shitter Firm, and stating that Hibs boys would never join forces with them again.

Acquaintances had been made with hooligans from the Newcastle Bender Squad and in August 1984 a couple of Hibs boys went with them to the Leicester City away game and were involved in the clashes between Newcastle Gremlins and the Leicester Baby Squad. By 1985 a few of the CCS was occasionally attending games in England with them for the prospect of football violence and some Geordie lads were doing likewise in Scotland.

When Manchester United played at St. James' Park in April 1986 the Hibs boys were invited to bring a mob down as it was likely that there would be a sizeable crew of Manchester hooligans present. The CCS paid into the away end of the ground and within ten minutes of the match starting they located the Manchester mob and started fighting with them as the Newcastle lads looked on through the segregation fence at a raging battle that took the police a while to control. This direct action was regarded as an affront by the main older Newcastle boys and when the Hibs casuals met up with them later on that day words were exchanged as the atmosphere between hosts and guests became heated.

Despite this the next month, in order to get away from Scotland and the looming prospect of Hearts winning the Scottish League with the unbearable celebrations that would ensue, a smaller group of Hibs boys travelled down to Newcastle to meet up with the Geordies for another away fixture at Leicester City. The night before the match several Hibs boys were out on the town in Newcastle in a jovial mood, at one point in a nightclub an older Hibs lad was wandering around with a dead bird in his jacket pocket asking Newcastle boys "Huv you met mah new bird?"

On the day of the game the Hibs boys along with the younger crew of Newcastle hooligans fought with the Leicester mob before the match. Once more the older set of Newcastle boys missed out on this violence and were disgruntled again that Hibs casuals were at the forefront. During the game as the unbelievable news began to filter in that Hearts had blown their chance of winning the title the Hibs boys exuberantly began to smash up the plastic seats in their section of the stadium, throwing them about and singing "lost the league, lost the league, lost the league" to which the Newcastle mob joined in with the singing and vandalism.

However, in the next season when West Ham United were playing in Newcastle the Hibs mob wanted to have the chance to take on one of the superior crews in England, the Inter City Firm, and opted to turn up unannounced. A large mob of CCS arrived at the Newcastle boys pub and volunteered to offer their services much to the chagrin of the Newcastle hooligans who expressed their dissatisfaction at the Hibs boys presence in such numbers and at the way they were again seemingly wanted to run the show. A robust police presence, as was the norm for this fixture at the time, ensured that it was a trouble free day and the hooligan agreement between Hibs casuals and the Geordie lads began to wither. It was finally severed when the two mobs clashed in Edinburgh after the Scotland v England fixture at the end of that season.

Also in the mid-1980s another similar hooligan bond had developed between the CCS and the newly formed Fine Young Casuals (FYC) associated with Oldham Athletic and in March 1987 the Hibs boys were invited to travel with them to their game against Sunderland at Roker Park. They had arranged to meet up in Newcastle railway station but the English police had already prevented a large section of the Oldham crew from travelling north so when the CCS arrived at the station they held the superior numbers. The police immediately rounded up the Hibs casuals and put them on the next train bound for Edinburgh and walked away assuming job done. However the Hibs mob duly exited the train via the windows onto the track, left the station and then returned to catch the train to Sunderland in time with their Oldham allies.

After the match the joint mob of Hibs and Oldham fought a series of running battles with Sunderland's crew all the way from Roker Park to the railway station. When the police eventually arrived the Hibs boys avoided being corralled with the Oldham lads and watched as Sunderland's mob entered the station. The CCS followed them and the two gangs clashed on one of the platforms. On the way back to Newcastle on the train there were some of the Sunderland hooligans in the same carriage as the Hibs boys whom they praised for their efforts that day. They also asked the CCS to join up with them during their upcoming mid-week game with Leeds United but this offer was declined.

Coincidentally in the summer of that year at the Okell's Football Festival pre-season football tournament held in the Isle of Man Hibernian and Oldham Athletic were amongst the clubs that had been invited to play and the hooligan alliance was strengthened further. Remarkably in the summer of the next year the two teams had a pre-season friendly fixture at Boundary Park and even with the CCS taking most of the battle honours the friendship continued.

Over the next ten years there was collaborations at Hibernian games in Scotland against Hearts, Rangers, Celtic and Aberdeen whilst in England for Oldham games versus Leeds, Spurs, Aston Villa, Huddersfield, both Manchester United and City as well as a cup game against Bolton in 1993. At this fixture twenty of the CCS made the trip which was a fifth of the combined firm's total. Upon arrival in Bolton the police intercepted this mixed mob of hooligans and began the process of bodysearching them, the weaponry offloaded by the Hibs boys was considered both numerous and awesome by their hosts. The mob was sent back to Manchester where they fought with Manchester United hooligans in a city centre bar. The Oldham-Hibs crew eventually made it back through to Bolton after pressganging a bus driver and after the game they clashed with Boltons mob. When Hibernian played Bolton in a friendly fixture in 2009 some of the Hibs boys lodged with the FYC the night before the game and a small crew of Oldham boys went along to the game the next day.

== Other law & order issues ==
Over the years accusations of a range of criminal activity not linked to football has been levelled towards the CCS as a whole as well as individuals within it. The police have been quoted in the Scottish press as stating the gang (or its members) have carried out or are responsible for organising armed robberies, shoplifting sprees, street muggings, housebreakings, protection rackets, extortion, drug dealing and murders as well as continuous public order offences around night life in pubs and clubs. This led to their inclusion in a Home Office Affairs Committee investigation into football hooligan gangs activity in the UK in the early 1990s.

== Club in crisis ==
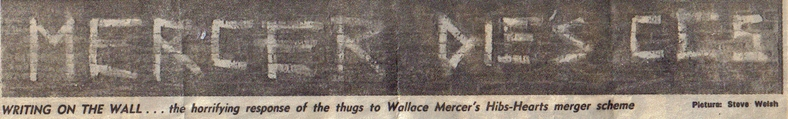
An example of the graffiti campaign aimed at Wallace Mercer.

After mismanagement during the late 1980s, Hibernian were on the brink of financial ruin in 1990 and in June of that year, Wallace Mercer, the chairman of Edinburgh derby rivals Hearts, proposed a merger of the two clubs. The Hibs fans believed that the proposal was little more than a hostile takeover and they formed the Hands off Hibs group to campaign for the continued existence of the club.

Although the CCS were never accepted by the club as real fans and despite the antipathy often shown towards them from other Hibs supporters, the gang were also opposed to this threat to the club's future. The CCS launched a graffiti campaign aimed directly at the Hearts chairman as well as issuing threats via the media and in letters and telephone calls to Tynecastle. One group of Hibs casuals went to Mercer's Edinburgh suburban home with the intention to confront him directly but upon realising he wasn't there they painted slogans on his house such as 'Mercer is dead' and 'Long Live Hibs'. Police with dogs were soon guarding his home as windows at his business properties were also smashed and bullets were being sent to him in the post. The Hands off Hibs committee quickly disassociated themselves from the vandalism and threatening behaviour.

The 'Mercer' derby

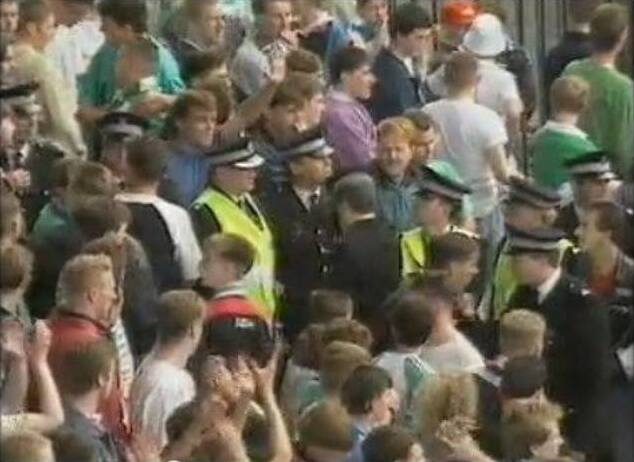
Police presence amongst the CCS during 15 September 1990 Hearts game

The first match to be played between the clubs after the failed takeover bid was at Easter Road the following September and in anticipation of trouble the police cancelled weekend leave and drafted in extra officers from outside Edinburgh. This decision was vindicated as this emotionally charged game was played in what was described as a volatile atmosphere. On the section of the east terracing next to the Dunbar end there were outbreaks of disorder throughout the first half, including incursions onto the playing field that caused the game to be halted and players' leaving the pitch until order was restored. During the interval there was more trouble on the terracing and fans again encroached onto the touchlines which delayed the start of the second half of the match. The police entered the Hearts dressing room during half-time and made a plea with them not to score any more goals as there was a real threat of a full pitch invasion by Hibs fans. Police later revealed that half of the arrests made at the game were of Hibs casuals.

== Splinter group ==
By the late 1990s a split within the gang led to some members creating a Scottish National Firm (SNF), made up of hooligans from other clubs in the country and also included hooligans from traditionally hated clubs such as Hearts, Airdrie and Rangers. The SNF was unreservedly right wing in its political motivations, and there was media suggestions that it had been encouraged by groups such as the British National Party. The intention of this new mob was to cause trouble at any game they appeared at, regardless of who was playing, either in Scotland, England or abroad, such as during the 1998 World Cup in France. This gang existed for only a short time and when it was disbanded the CCS members of it went on to become a significant part of the Manchester United superfirm the Men in Black. According to Manchester United hooligan Colin Blaney the Men in Black's trend of wearing black clothing was inspired by Hibs, who did this as a means of avoiding being recognized by the police.

== In popular culture ==
By 2005 the Scottish Football Museum at Hampden Park had in its popular culture section a display case that contained a pair of Adidas training shoes and a sweater worn by a Hibs casual in the 1980s.

=== Literature ===
The author Irvine Welsh has included many references to the gang in his works with the most noted being the eponymous story in The Acid House collection and the novel Marabou Stork Nightmares. In The Acid House Coco Bryce is a Hibs boy who while tripping on LSD is struck by lightning which also strikes an ambulance containing a woman in the process of giving birth. He is transplanted into the baby's body in which later on he contrives a meet-up with the CCS in a pub prior to a Hibernian match. Marabou Stork Nightmares is a tale related through the perspective of Roy Strang who is in a comatose state. He was a frontline participant of the CCS and the story relays confrontations between them and other mobs as well as Roy's personal discourse on what it was like to be a Hibs casual. There are references to other fictional Hibs casuals and events in Filth, Glue, Porno, Reheated Cabbage and Skagboys.

For the film adaptation of The Acid House in 1998 directed by Paul McGuigan a Hibs boy was involved in assisting on wardrobe and providing some bona fida Hibs casuals as extras for the final scene in the pub. Some clothing suggested for the scene and also the use of club colours were rejected by the Hibs boys as they would deem the portrayal of casuals as being non-authentic. During filming the director requested that the Hibs boys sing some CCS songs and chants and they complied much to his approval.

Decade by Pat W. Henderson is a novel about Scottish criminals set in the rave music scene of the early 1990s. It touches upon the football hooliganism around that time and the Hibs casuals make an appearance as they attack Houlihans bar in Dundee to take on the Utility.

The Scots actor-writer Ruaraidh Murray based his one-man show Big Sean, Mikey and me around his life in Edinburgh during the 1980s and 1990s, his close friendship with a renowned Hibs casual and includes their encounters with other casual gangs. He first performed this at the Gilded Balloon during the Edinburgh Festival Fringe of 2012 and is currently adapting the stage script of it for a radio and film production.

=== Documentary, television and cinema ===
In June 1989 the Radio Forth documentary magazine Forth File aired its interviews with six members of the CCS, Jim Gray Managing Director of Hibernian F.C., Alistair Darling MP, Superintendent Tom Wood of Lothian & Borders police and Bert Moorhouse a senior lecturer at Glasgow University. The shows presenter Andrew Glover declared that the gang were planning a campaign of terror in Europe in the approaching football season and coined the phrase "A nightmare in Europe part 1". The Hibs casuals talked about why they were hooligans and also about the prospect of entering the upcoming UEFA Cup. One hooligan was quoted as saying that "We'll be doing it for Hibs, for pride of the club, for pride of Edinburgh".

The Trouble on the Terraces documentary released in 1994 on VHS format looked at football hooliganism in the UK and on the European continent prior to the Euro 96 tournament. Some Hibs boys were among the interviewees while they were in Amsterdam before the friendly international fixture between the Netherlands and Scotland.

Sky Sports Soccer AM team unwittingly accepted a request from one of the CCS for a chance to represent Hibernian in the shows Fans of the week feature and seven of them were invited to appear on the 2 September 2000 broadcast. The Hibs boys travelled to London on the Friday and their evening was spent drinking, while some were smoking cannabis as well, as they recounted hooligan tales from the past which ran into the wee small hours. So it was a shabby looking bunch that were mostly still blatantly in an alcoholic haze who shuffled onto the mini-bus bound for the studios at 6 a.m. the next morning. While in the dressing room as one of the production assistants was handing out the white Hibernian away jerseys provided by the club they noticed that the Hibs casuals were wearing t-shirts with hooligan slogans on them and instructed them that during the show not to make any noise until prompted and on no account should they reveal their CCS shirts while on air. Also, both of the shows presenters at the time, Tim Lovejoy and Helen Chamberlain, went into the room and reiterated the instructions regarding behaviour with the latter revealing the Torquay United tattoo on her posterior upon request from the still inebriated Scotsmen. When the show started and they were introduced the Hibs boys burst into chants of CCS, CCS and one of them danced in front of the camera and instantly revealed his These Colours Don't Run t-shirt with further sporadic outbursts similar to this throughout the show. Their antics were picked up by the News of the World and the next day they ran a story highlighting that Scotland's most notorious hooligan gang had tricked their way onto the show.

BBC Scotland's investigative current affairs programme Frontline Scotland broadcast in 2004 its report Policing the casuals on the rise of football hooliganism in the country and the legislation proposed by Scottish police forces dealing with it. Included in the show was coverage of how the police dealt with a Category A match involving Hibernian away to Hearts in October of that year and the casual gangs associated with both clubs.

In 2006 the documentary series The Real Football Factories created by Zig Zag Productions was shown on the Bravo TV channel which looked at football hooligans and firms throughout the UK. The episode that focused on Scottish hooligans included a segment on the CCS and there were interviews with two of its former members as well as a journalist who had reported on them during the emergence of Scottish casuals in the mid 1980s.

=== Music ===
Rave music, Madchester and baggy scenes were all touched upon by CCS in some way. In Edinburgh Hibs boys ran dance clubs like Bubble Funk or organised other musical promotion events in venues such as the Calton Studios.

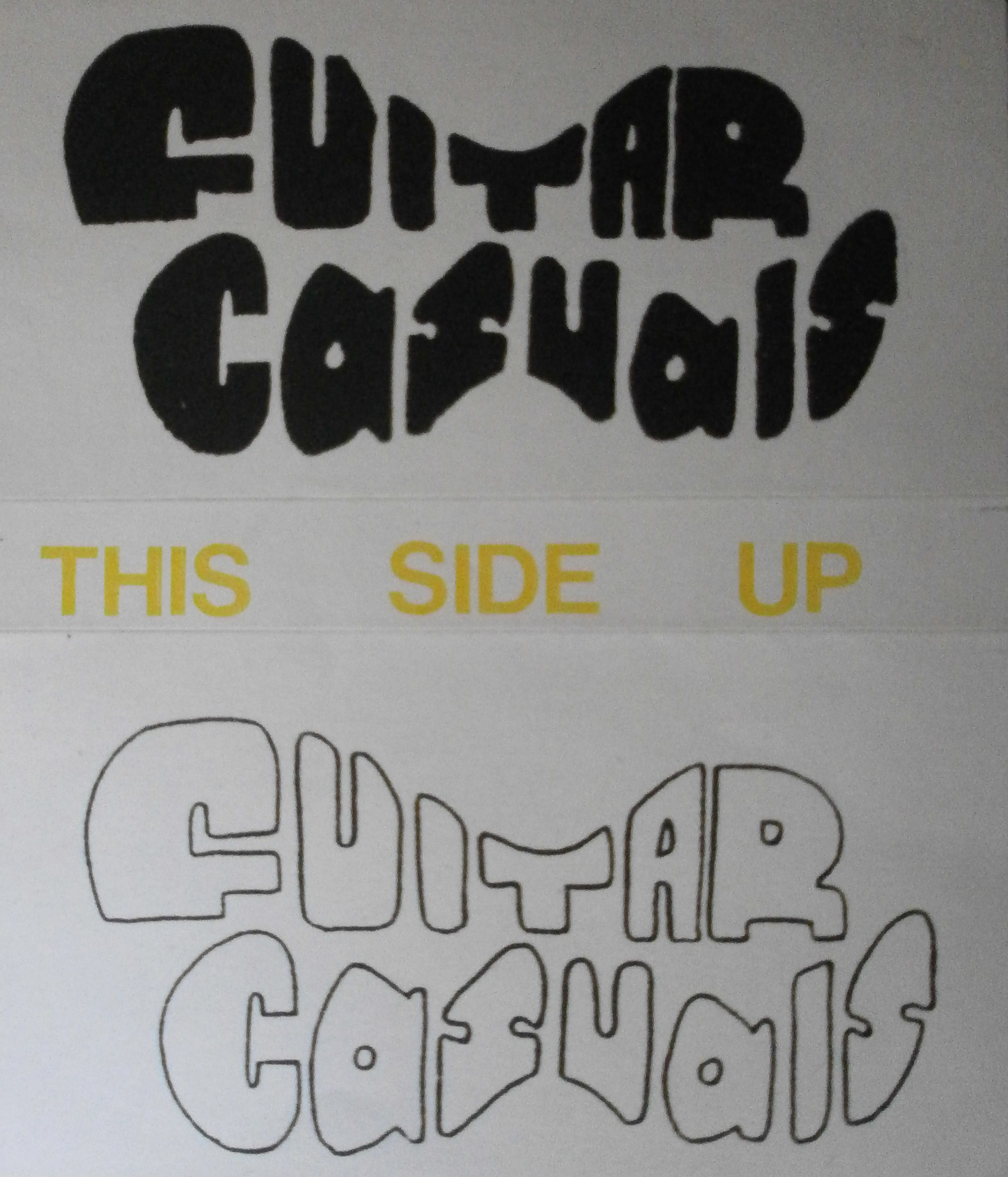
Guitar Casuals Demo Tape Cover

At an Inspiral Carpets gig played in Edinburgh some Hibs boys clashed with their roadies who were chanting the name of Manchester City's firm the Guvnors. Another band from Greater Manchester Northside played at the Calton Studios to a crowd mainly of Hibs casuals and students. Their lead singer Warren "Dermo" Dermody pleased a section of the audience by wearing a These Colours Don't Run t-shirt during their show. The Shamen also performed at this venue and towards the end of their set a Hibs boy climbed onto the stage and started dancing, As the security went to remove him Will Synott of the band stopped them by saying just let the guy dance. The intoxicated casual then commandeered a microphone and while holding his Burberry scarf aloft he burst into a rendition of Move Any Mountain. Will Synott fell over as he now went to intervene and as the security tried to assist he fell off the stage and the concert ended prematurely.

Influenced by these music scenes a local Edinburgh band was formed called the Guitar Casuals, one of whom was a Hibs boy. Trouble frequently occurred wherever they played and they were ultimately banned from most of the live venues in the city.

=== Fashion ===
By the late 1990s a leading Hibs casual had opened a clothes shop on South Clerk Street in Edinburgh called Original Casuals.

Fashion designer and owner of Norton & Sons bespoke tailors Patrick Grant has stated that it was his encounters with Hibs casuals in his formative years that aroused his interest in fashion.

== See also ==
- Casual (subculture)
- List of hooligan firms
