= Andrew Nicol =

Andrew Nicol may refer to:

- Andy Nicol (born 1971), Scottish rugby union player
- Andrew Nicol (judge) (1951–2026), British judge
- Andrew Niccol (born 1964), New Zealand screenwriter
- Andrew Nicholl (1804–1886), New Zealand screenwriter
- Andy Nicholls (born 1962), Welsh football hooligan
