= Andy Nicholls =

Welsh football hooligan

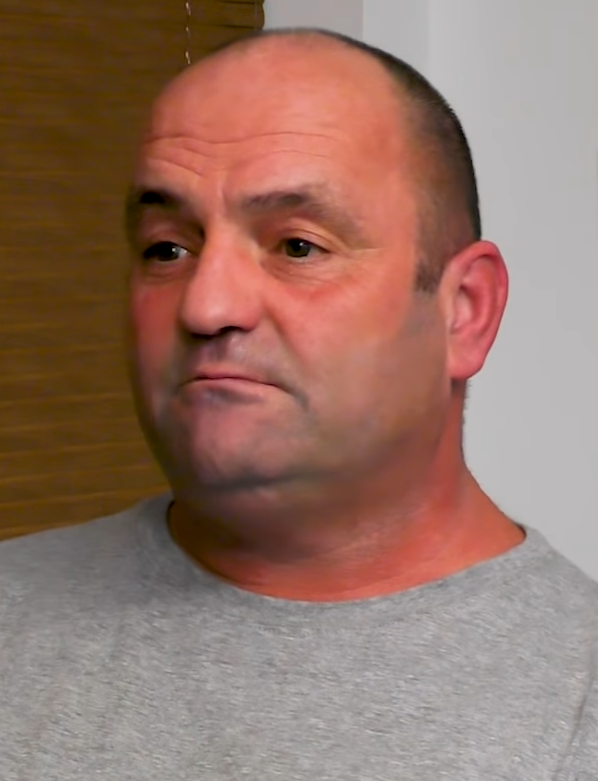
- Nicholls in 2021
- Born: 1962 (age 63–64)
- Education: Alun School
- Occupation: Author
- Writing career
- Period: Modern
- Genres: Fandom and autobiography
- Subject: Football hooliganism
- Organization: County Road Cutters
- Style: Casual
- Website: andy-nicholls.co.uk

Andy Nicholls (born 1962), is a Welsh former football hooligan, manager, and author of a number of books on football hooliganism. He has been banned from every ground in England and Wales and has served time in prison for football related violence. Nicholls has said he "would change nothing" about his time as a football hooligan, including "pillaging and dismantling European cities, leaving horrified locals to rebuild in time for our next visit" and having "seen visiting fans at Goodison Park pleading not to be carved open after straying too far from the safety of their numbers;" however, he is wary of violence coming to his own doorstep since he has had children.

== Background ==
When he was a boy he went to the Alun School in Flintshire. For over twenty years he was regularly involved with the violent followers of the club. Nicholls was classified by the National Football Intelligence Unit (NFIU) as a Category C hooligan, the highest NFIU rating. He has been arrested more than twenty times for football related offences and has been deported from Belgium, Iceland and Sweden. He created the terrace fanzine Get into Them which was closed down by authorities.

Nicholls received a new Football Banning Order (FBO) on 6 October 2003 banning him from every football ground in England and Wales for two years, apart from games where he was there as manager of Welsh Alliance League club, Holywell Town F.C. when he admitted to being involved in football hooliganism in his book, Scally: Confessions of a Category C Football Hooligan and for his involvement in a pub fight between Everton and Aston Villa fans, in which he claimed he was only helping injured victims to escape. He had been summoned to Liverpool Magistrates Court under the Football Disorder Act over the publication of the book, and banned for two years, with £500 costs.

In April 2004, Nicholls was convicted by Flintshire magistrates for breaching the banning order, after he attended a match in Russia between Wales and Russia. Nicholls who lived in Rhosesmor in North East Wales, at the time had attended the match as part of a Holywell Town club trip. Nicholls claimed that he did not know the ban applied to Welsh games, as being an England supporter he thought the ban only applied to England. Nicholls would later become chairman of Holywell Town. Nicholls' ban from Everton means he has to stay a minimum of 10 miles from any match they play home or away. As part of his banning order he also had to sign in at a police station on match days, and hand in his passport every time a British team played abroad. His banning order expired in 2005.

Nicholls appeared on the BBC documentary programme Panorama during an undercover investigation into previously unreported violence at the 2006 World Cup. In the programme he was quoted as saying, "To stamp out hooliganism once and for all, you'd have to get every man between 14 and 40 and chop off their arms and legs."

Nicholls' first book, Scally: Confessions of a Category C Football Hooligan dealt with the victim knife attacks perpetrated by the County Road Cutters firm, who are associated with Everton. He chronicles the bitter Manchester-Merseyside battles that left hundreds injured. He also confronts the alleged problems of racism at Goodison Park and he describes rivalries with the gangs of Aberdeen, Chelsea, Millwall, Middlesbrough and other clubs. He has also co-authored three other books with fellow former football hooligan, Cass Pennant.

== Bibliography ==
- Nicholls, Andy (2002). Scally: Confessions of a Category C Football Hooligan. Milo Books. ISBN 1903854113.
- Lowles, Nick; Nicholls, Andy (2005). Hooligans Vol.1: The A-L of British Football Hooligan Gangs. Milo Books. ISBN 1903854636.
- Lowles, Nick; Nicholls, Andy (2006). Hooligans Vol.2: The M-Z of Britain's Football Hooligan Gangs. Milo Books. ISBN 1903854644.
- Pennant, Cass; Nicholls, Andy (2006). 30 Years of Hurt: A History of England's Hooligan Army. Pennant Books. ISBN 0955039428.
