= Gorgie Aggro =

Scottish football hooligan firm

Gorgie Aggro were a notorious football firm of the 1980s and 90s, being associated with Heart of Midlothian F.C.
