= County Road Cutters =

Football hooligan firm of Everton FC

- Nickname: Cutters
- Type: Hooligan firm
- Purpose: Everton F.C. supporters group
- Location: Liverpool, England

County Road Cutters
- Ethnicity: White British, Irish
- Activities: football hooliganism , riots, vandalism, arson, ticket tout

The County Road Cutters are a hooligan firm associated with Premier League football club Everton F.C.

== Origins ==
The County Road Cutters were, at their peak throughout the 1980s and early 1990s, one of the largest hooligan firms in England. Their name derives from County Road, the long road leading up to Everton's previous home ground, Goodison Park, in Walton, Liverpool, and also from the firm's use of Stanley knives in fights with other hooligan firms.

== History and rivalries ==
Members of the Cutters are known to be one of the first firms to adopt casual clothing and designer garments in the 1970s along with hooligan supporters of local rivals Liverpool F.C.

Andy Nicholls, a former 'general' in the County Road Cutters throughout the 1980s and 1990s, who was branded a category C football hooligan by the National Football Intelligence Unit (NFIU), the highest NFIU rating, claims that the Cutters had strong rivalries with hooligan firms of the two Manchester teams, Manchester United F.C. and Manchester City F.C., the Sunderland firm Seaburn Casuals, as well as with the Chelsea Headhunters, a firm associated with Chelsea F.C., and the Millwall Bushwackers, a firm associated with Millwall F.C. As of 6 October 2003, Nicholls was banned for life from Goodison Park.

The Cutters have been involved in a number of high-profile clashes with other firms, most notably in 2005 with the Red Army, a firm associated with Manchester United. Hooligan supporters of the two teams clashed outside Goodison Park after the game, in which Everton triumphed 1-0 thanks to a Duncan Ferguson headed goal. The fight between the supporters is known as 'The Battle of Everton Valley', and is widely thought to be the worst incident of football related violence Merseyside has ever seen. Around 100 United fans were left bloodied and injured, and within hooligan circles, the 'battle' is widely regarded as a 'win' for the County Road Cutters. Some sources claim that Liverpool FC hooligans joined forces with the Cutters to battle against the Red Army. According to Manchester United hooligan Colin Blaney in his book Undesirables, the Cutters have also come to blows with Manchester United's Red Army firm over disputes stemming from both firms' involvement in illegal ticket touting at pop concerts.
