= Section B =

- Founding location: Airdrie, Scotland
- Years active: 1977–present

Section B are a group of football supporters founded in 1977 who follow Airdrieonians F.C., and before the current club's formation in 2002, followed the original Airdrieonians.

== Formation ==
During the late 1960s and early to mid-1970s the town of Airdrie often witnessed hooliganism and misbehaviour in and around Broomfield Park where Airdrieonians played. The larger clubs, namely Celtic, Rangers, Hearts and Hibs, would often have an element of their support that would cause bother to the local fans. Section B were formed as a direct response to this threat, and were originally made up of an amalgamation of smaller groups of gangs from around the town. This diverse mixture combined punks, mods and others.

Contrary to popular belief, Section B were not named after the stadium they frequented, but in tribute to a local punk band by the same name who were active at the time.
