= Red Army (football) =

English Manchester United hooligan firm

The Red Army is a hooligan firm who follow English football club Manchester United. Although today the term Red Army is used mostly to refer to fans of the club in general, the hooligan firm has been one of the largest firms in British football. Firm members – and the firm itself – are sometimes known as the Men in Black, due to the members dressing in all black clothing. In his book Hotshot, Red Army hooligan Harry Gibson states that there are also sub-divisions of the firm known as the Young Munichs, the Inter City Jibbers (ICJ), the M58 Firm and the Moston Rats. In his book Undesirables, Colin Blaney has also stated that the ICJ is dedicated to carrying out acquisitive forms of crime in addition to football hooliganism. He claims that members of the group have been involved in smuggling drugs to Europe and Asia from Latin America and the Caribbean, organizing jail breaks, carrying out armed robberies, travelling overseas to Asia and mainland Europe in order to steal jewellery and committing street robberies. It is the criminal wing of the Red Army.

== Background ==
The Red Army was the name given to Manchester United's away support during the 1970s. Most notoriously in 1974–75, when United had been relegated from the top flight of English football and played one season in the Second Division, the Red Army caused mayhem at grounds up and down the country, visiting stadiums where they would at times outnumber the home support. Together with a Bolton Wanderers fan stabbing a young Blackpool fan to death behind the Spion Kop at Bloomfield Road in Blackpool during a Second Division match on 24 August 1974, this led to the introduction of crowd segregation and fencing at football grounds in England.

The Red Army were featured in the 1985 documentary Hooligan, based around West Ham United's trip to Old Trafford in the FA Cup sixth round. It shows the Red Army fighting with the Inter City Firm (ICF) around Manchester. They were also featured in The Real Football Factories documentary series. An episode of the BBC drama, Life on Mars centred on football hooliganism by Manchester United fans in the 1970s.

Tony O'Neill, the man behind the firm and a former member, has released two books about the firm: Red Army General in 2005 concentrating on the 1970s and early 1980s; and The Men in Black in 2006 which told the history from the mid-1980s to the present day.

Their activities have declined since the late 1980s as football hooliganism in general has become a less prolific problem than it was for more than a decade before that.
