= Newcastle Gremlins =

- Founding location: Newcastle
- Years active: 1985–present
- Territory: Tyne and Wear
- Membership (est.): 250-300
- Criminal activities: Football hooliganism
- Allies: English Border Front (Shrewsbury Town)
- Rivals: Seaburn Casuals, The Frontline, Inter City Firm

Newcastle Gremlins are a football hooligan firm associated with the English football club Newcastle United F.C.

== Altercations with the Seaburn Casuals ==
In March 2002, the Gremlins fought with hooligans from Sunderland's Seaburn Casuals in a pre-arranged clash near the North Shields Ferry terminal, in what was described as "some of the worst football related fighting ever witnessed in the United Kingdom". with 28 others jailed for various terms, based on evidence gained after police examined the messages sent by mobile phone between the gang members on the day.

On 2 April 2003, about 95 fans were arrested when around 200 fans of Sunderland and Newcastle clashed in Sunderland city centre before an England UEFA Euro 2004 qualifying match against Turkey in the city. The fans then attacked the police, pelting them with missiles including bottles, cans and wheel trims. Some sources attributed these clashes to a resurgence in the conflict between the Gremlins and Seaburn Casuals.
