= List of gangs in the Netherlands =

The following is a list of gangs, organized crime syndicates and criminal enterprises in the Netherlands.

Street gangs have become a significant concern in several major Dutch cities, including Amsterdam, Utrecht, and especially Rotterdam. These gangs, often involved in illegal activities like drug trafficking, violent crime, and robberies, have a growing presence in urban areas. In Amsterdam and Utrecht, gang activity is typically concentrated in certain neighborhoods, with tensions rising between rival groups. However, Rotterdam stands out as a particularly troubled city, where gang violence, shootings, and turf wars over drug markets have become more common, the rise of these gangs has prompted both local and national authorities to step up efforts to combat organized crime and restore safety to these communities.

== Dutch Gangs ==
- Eight Tray Gangster Crips (ETG)
- Rollin’30s Harlem Crips (Dirt Gang)
- LARAZA MAFIA CRIPS (LMC)
- Hopi Boys
- Kloekhorststraat Gang
- 6 Boys
- 075 Zaandam Crips
- 800Side Crips
- Wijk 14
- C34 Vlaardingen Oost
- D31 Vlaardingen
- NOL Nation
- 022 Tilburg
- Scheme015
- Cash Rules On Our Streets (CROOS)
- Zone 6 Holendrecht
- Green Street boys (#GreenGang)
- Mob Street Crips
- 6th Rotterdam Gangster Disciples (#GDN)
- Amsterdam Insane Gangster Disciples (#GDN)
- Grape Street Crips
- porteum764
- Gangster Disciples (#GDN)
- 241 Gangster Crip (#SinQuinGang)
- Rollin 70 Insane Crips (#Koppel)
- No Limit Soldiers
- Rollin 200 Crips (#SK6)
- 88 neighborhood stones
- LSG
- Hippolytushood Gang
- Southside First Tray Crips
- The Traynity
- United Blood Nation
- zone 13 Amsterdam
- Jongens van de straat
- Rollin 60 Neighborhood Crips (Also young #SK6 members)
- Rollin 20 Crips
- EastCoast Crips (#62ECC #66ECC #53ECC)
- Delft Pirus (#ZQ)
- Main Triad Crips
- Fully Op Gevaar (#FOG)
- KikkenStein Bende (#KSB)
- 73 De Pijp
- 22 stown (schiedam)
- The Sybrenboys
- SK6
- + Many Many More

== Hispanic and Latino ==
- Latin Kings
- Mob Street Crips
- 16 street blue devils
- Lanzas Chilenos (Chilean)
- MS-13 (Salvadorans)
- 18th Street Gang

== Asian triads ==
- 14K (Chinese)
- Ah Kong (mainly Singaporean Chinese)
- Shui Fong (Chinese)
- Sun Yee On (Han Chinese)
- Wo Shing Wo (mainly Chinese and Vietnamese)

== Turkish ==
- Black Jackets

== Southeastern European ==
- Albanian mafia
- Greek mafia
- Romanian mafia

== Italian organized crime ==
- Camorra
  - Contini clan
  - Di Lauro clan
  - Licciardi clan
  - Secondigliano Alliance
- 'Ndrangheta

== Eastern European ==
- Bulgarian mafia
- Serbian mafia
- Solntsevskaya Bratva

== Football hooligan firms ==
- A.F.C.A.
- S.C.F. Hooligans
- F-side

== Outlaw motorcycle clubs ==
- Bandidos Motorcycle Club
  - Chicanos Motorcycle Club
- Black Sheep Motorcycle Club
- Caloh Wagoh
- Confederates Motorcycle Club
- Demons Motorcycle Club
- Gladiators Motorcycle Club
- Gringos Motorcycle Club
- Hells Angels
  - Flying Eagles Motorcycle Club
  - Hardliners Motorcycle Club
  - Red Devils Motorcycle Club
- Mongols Motorcycle Club
- No Surrender Motorcycle Club
- Rebel Crew Motorcycle Club
- Road Knights Motorcycle Club
- Rogues Motorcycle Club
- Satudarah
  - Saudarah
  - Supportcrew 999
  - Yellow Snakes
- Spiders Motorcycle Club
- Trailer Trash Travelers Motorcycle Club
- Veterans Motorcycle Club

== Defunct organized crime groups ==
- Bruinsma crime syndicate
- Chieftains Motorcycle Club
