= Martin van de Pol =

Dutch criminal (1964–2021)

- Born: 23 October 1964
- Died: 4 March 2021 (aged 56); Amsterdam-Zuidoost, Netherlands
- Cause of death: Gunshot wound
- Occupations: Bandit, football hooligan

Martin van de Pol nicknamed Polletje and Boeroe (23 August 1964 – 4 March 2021) was an AFC Ajax football hooligan frontman.

From 1997 he was imprisoned for three years for raping his ex-girlfriend and stabbing her new boyfriend. After being released he killed four men by opening fire in sex club Esther in Haarlem in 2000, including members of the Hells Angels. Polletje was initially sentenced to life for his role in the murders, but on appeal it was reduced to 15 years. He was also an Ajax football hooligan, having big influence in the club. He was visited in prison by then-Ajax chairman Michael van Praag, who gave him a shirt of player Richard Witschge. Polletje wais said knew who had killed Ajax hooligan Carlo Picornie during the Battle of Beverwijk in 1997 and Polletje wanted to take revenge; van Praag prevented this.

Upon release in 2010 Van de Pol became a security guard at the Ajax fan club and an influential leader of the group of Ajax hooligans. He was linked with a drug-smuggling incident involving a bus of Ajax fans travelling to Dortmund, Germany, in September 2012. The next day he was arrested in Dortmund with some others. Later in 2012 he was standing close to Martin Hilligers, a notorious rapist and convicted murderer, when they were attacked by men wearing balaclavas in Badhoevedorp. Both of them survived the attack, but Martin Hilligers' brother, Remco Hilligers, died after being shot by one of the attackers. A few months later he was filmed during football riots in Milan.

Van de Pol was shot and killed in Amsterdam-Zuidoost on 4 March 2021, aged 56, while he was picking up his 7-year-old daughter from school. When they arrived at his ex-wife's house, a man was waiting for him in the porch and shot Martin in the head. The suspect then ran away, and Martin died shortly after in presence of the police who responded to the scene.

== See also ==
- A.F.C.A (hooligans)
- F-side
