= AFCA =

AFCA may refer to:

== Organizations ==
=== Sports ===
- A.F.C.A (hooligans), a Dutch hooligan firm linked to A.F.C. Ajax
- AFCA Supportersclub, an independent and official supporters' association linked to AFC Ajax football club
- American Football Coaches Association, an association of over 11,000 American football coaches and staff

=== Other organizations ===
- A.F.C.A (clothing), a brand of urban lifestyle clothing founded by the late Sven Westendorp
- Australian Film Critics Association, professional association for film critics, reviewers and journalists
- Australian Financial Complaints Authority, an external dispute resolution scheme for consumers
- Cyberspace Capabilities Center (previously the Air Force Communications Agency), the organization for cyber IT requirements in the US Air Force
