= A.F.C.A =

A.F.C.A may refer to:

- A.F.C.A (clothing)
- A.F.C.A (hooligans)
