= Battle of Beverwijk =

1997 football hooligan incident in the Netherlands

Coordinates: 52°28′31.57″N 4°40′48.63″E

- Date: 23 March 1997
- Location: Beverwijk, Netherlands
- Caused by: Football hooliganism
- Result: Ajax hooligans chased away by Feyenoord hooligans, then both fled the police

Parties
| Ajax hooligans: F-side | Feyenoord hooligans: S.C.F. Hooligans |

Lead figures
| Carlo Picornie † | Unknown |

Number
| 150 | 300 |

Casualties and losses
| 1 dead | Low |

The Battle of Beverwijk (Dutch: "Slag bij Beverwijk") was a violent confrontation between two hooligan supporter groups of Dutch Association football clubs Ajax and Feyenoord, the F-Side and the S.C.F. Hooligans. The incident took place on 23 March 1997 along the A9 motorway near Beverwijk, from which its name is derived.

== Prelude ==
The intent of the meeting between the two groups was revenge after a previous fight between both the F-Side and S.C.F firms which had taken place on 16 February 1997 along the A10 motorway. On that day Feyenoord was playing away against FC Volendam - a town to the North of Amsterdam and the Feyenoord fans used the A10 Amsterdam ring road on their way to the match. Both groups were to arrive with 50 hooligans each, ready for combat. The Feyenoord hooligans S.C.F., however, arrived with 75. The F-Side group were forced to escape, since they had actually arrived with 100 fighters as previously agreed upon between the two groups. The S.C.F. didn't hold their promise, as other occasions showed that the F-side group often did the same to other groups. On the date of the event, Ajax and Feyenoord were scheduled to play in Waalwijk and Alkmaar and the police were made aware that both supporter groups were going to clash on that date, but they did not know at which location. A platoon of police mobile units was deployed to the Beverwijk Bazaar nonetheless, to protect the crowd from a potential hazard. Beverwijk is just like Volendam also located north of Amsterdam. The Feyenoord fans would almost certainly pass here on their way to the game against AZ Alkmaar.

== The confrontation ==
Due to road construction, the two hooligan groups of both clubs met in a meadow near the motorway, armed with knives, baseball bats, iron bars, electroshock weapons and claw hammers, along with other armaments; the groups went into combat in an unprecedented fashion. The Feyenoord hooligans kept the upper-hand, trapped the Ajax hooligans along the motorway while attacking from both sides. The remaining Ajax hooligans were forced to fight or run for their lives. When the police arrived on the scene, they were very surprised by the speed and intensity of the fighting. The Police had arrived so late that no arrests were actually made, but several weapons were seized from both parties involved.

== The death of Carlo Picornie and the aftermath ==
During the scuffle, one of the Ajax hooligans, Carlo Picornie, was killed. He was one of the more long-term members within the hard core of the F-Side. He died due to 3 knife stabs which filled his lungs. One member of S.C.F. was convicted due to Carlo Picornie's death, namely 21-year-old Leonardo Pansier, who was given an unconditional prison sentence of 5 years. During the procedure, following the murder of Carlo Picornie, Leonardo Pansier was also found guilty of attempted murder on H. Joos, another Ajax hooligan. Joos was also present in the violent attack in Beverwijk and was seriously injured here as well. Feyenoord hooligan Marco P. and 25-year-old hooligan Daniël C. were sentenced to four years in prison. Daniël C. was convicted because he stabbed H. Joos with a knife, and likely was involved in the death of Carlo Picornie. Charged with attempted murder, Marco P. was also charged with the same sentence for his involvement in the murder of Carlo Picornie. Feyenoord hooligan Vincent M. was also convicted in the attack on H. Joos, having beaten him with a bat. Although he claimed to have not hit hard with the bat, he too was convicted of attempted murder, as well as having raised suspicion regarding his involvement with the murder of Carlo Picornie. Leonardo Pansier was the only participant to have continuously denied involvement in the murder of Picornie.

In 2009, Leonardo Pansier was invited as a guest on the TV show Sophie op 3 of BNN where he revealed that he felt betrayed by members of his own hooligan group. The stories that made the rounds regarding several people who were involved in those incidents during the court process failed to include those who executed the final blow. Claiming that those who actually killed him were never caught. But the fact of the matter is that more Feyenoord hooligans made accusative recounts towards Leonardo Pansier in their statements, which ultimately led to the conviction of Leonardo Pansier in the case. Multiple witnesses at the scene had reported to have seen Leonardo enraged with a bicycle lock beating on Carlo's head. Furthermore, the videotape of the A9 motorway security cameras had captured the act on camera. However the footage from the camera was deemed as insufficient because it was of poor quality and did not capture a lot of what had actually happened along the motorway.

== Alleged scheme ==
Carlo Picornie was born 15 October 1961 and due to his age was no longer considered an active member of the hard core of the F-Side. But Picornie wanted to set an example for the young emerging hooligans at Ajax and attended the Battle in Beverwijk. During the fight, Picornie was separated from his group, along with H. Joos with both Ajax hooligans being surrounded by Feyenoord Hooligans, leading to their injuries and Carlo's death on the scene.

Following the funeral of Picornie, in which Ajax chairman Michael van Praag was in attendance, unrest began amongst the F-Side hooligans. The Ajax hooligans started to blame each other for Picornie's death, claiming that not enough was done to protect his life. It was also not being considered an accident that alone "Picornie" was targeted and coincidentally murdered. Picornie had been an icon for Ajax hooligans for years, an old member with a violent reputation amongst the F-Side. Prior to his death Picornie was known to never avoid a confrontation. It was believed that the Feyenoord hooligans were looking to send a message to the Ajax hooligans group by murdering Picornie. During the TV show "De Harde Kern" from 1998 with host Bas van Hout, which focused on the hooligan groups of the biggest clubs of the Netherlands, Bas van Hout interviewed two masked members of the Feyenoord hooligan group who offered some information over the events that occurred in Beverwijk. According to one of these hooligans, it could not just as easily been a different hooligan than Picornie. That due to the circumstances Picornie had been singled out by the Feyenoord hooligans due to his reputation as an Ajax hooligan. Given the manner in which he was killed, probably at the hand of more than one person, his murder was largely considered intentional, and that the Feyenoord hooligans had singled out Picornie (considering the reputation of the fighter) to consciously send a message to the hooligans of Ajax. But whether it was known from the Feyenoord group that Picornie would be in attendance, or whether they had singled him out remains unknown. It is also said that Picornie simply had bad luck to encounter a bunch of Feyenoord hooligans who were under the influence of drugs and alcohol who simply beat him to death.

During the broadcast of "De harde kern", the Feyenoord hooligans had revealed to Bas van Hout that a certain hierarchy was present within the hooligan groups which was comparable to that of a criminal organization. Those who stood accused by the Public prosecution were later wiped from the table by a Judge, because there was no substantial evidence delivered. Even though the meeting and intention had been declared as premeditated, with an example of both hooligan groups being delivered due to their previous encounter along A10. It is also noteworthy that although the police were present during the incident, that very little police intervention was done. Weapons were simply confiscated and people were being searched for weapons to prove whether or not they were participants in the incident instead. Nobody at the time of the event was held accountable or arrested. It was said that the police were possibly scared that arrests would lead to more violence. Later when more clarity regarding the incident had come to light, it became clear that some arrests actually had been made. A few days prior to the battle of Beverwijk, Ajax hooligans had been called "pussies" by ex-Feyenoord hooligan Daniël C. As Daniël was being interviewed by a journalist of NOS after a short altercation along the A10 motorway. Later Ajax hooligans were made the laughing stock on camera, by Feyenoord hooligan Gijs van D. through a banner in De Kuip which read: "A'dam lopen altijd weg, A10, mietjes" (English: "A'dam always run away, A10 pussies"). Events such as this one along with other incidents are also regarded as contributing factors in the battle of Beverwijk, for which Carlo Picornie paid with his life.

== Aftermath ==
During the broadcast of the show Sophie op 3 it became clear that the death of Picornie had caused great unrest in the S.C.F. hooligans group of Feyenoord as well. People reportedly told on each other resulting in several convictions. Noninvasive statements had been made about each other with many people lying about their involvement regarding Picornies death. The three Feyenoord hooligans who were guests on the show reported that those truly responsible for the death of Picornie could no longer live in Rotterdam, and that they themselves had already left the city, out of fear for revenge from fellow members. The only person who was eventually convicted of the murder of Picornie stated in the broadcast that: "His life had changed to a peaceful one due to the events he had experienced in Beverwijk, although he would remain a hooligan" The definite responsible for Picornies death never became clear, as Leonardo Pansier kept denying his involvement in the murder. As a so-called "vow of silence" exists amongst the hooligans group of people involved, this may never become clear.

The death of Picornie lead to a lot of anxiety in the media. He had not been the first deadly victim of hooligan-club violence. In 1991 FC Twente-hooligan Eric Lassche had been beaten to death during riots. The novel "de Movo Tapes" by Dutch writer A.F.Th. van der Heijden is partially based on the Battle of Beverwijk.

== See also ==
- Iron rod incident
- 1989 De Meer nail bombs
- 1999 Rotterdam riots
