= 1989 De Meer nail bombs =

Football hooligan incident in the Netherlands

- Date: 22 October 1989
- Location: Amsterdam, Netherlands
- Caused by: Football hooliganism

Parties
Ajax fans: F-side	Feyenoord fans: S.C.F. Hooligans

Casualties and losses
19 injuries	none

On 22 October 1989 during an association football match, two home-made nail bombs were thrown by a Feyenoord hooligan at De Meer Stadion, the home ground of AFC Ajax in Amsterdam, Netherlands. The explosions injured 19 people.

== Background ==
The rivalry between Ajax and Feyenoord football clubs, who hail from Amsterdam and Rotterdam respectively, is one of the fiercest in the continent. During the 1980s there has been a large number of significant hooligan incidents between the two clubs and amongst other Dutch clubs. Another major hooligan incident not related to the derby in 1989 was the Staafincident, when an Ajax hooligan threw a metal rod at the goalkeeper during a match against Austria Wien.

== Incident ==
A Feyenoord hooligan threw the bombs, containing nails and fireworks, at a home section of the ground. Nineteen fans were hurt, nine of them seriously. Riot police immediately cleared the away section and searched all the away fans when exiting. The game continued as usual, ending in a 1–1 draw.

== Aftermath ==
The incident was widely reported in national and international media. An article in The Times said that "the Dutch reputation for football violence is rapidly overtaking that of the British as the worst in Europe."

By Tuesday 24 October, three Feyenoord fans were arrested by police. Feyenoord was ordered to play its next match against FC Den Haag behind closed doors.

The incident, among others, influenced the decision to build the all-seater Amsterdam ArenA.

== See also ==
- Battle of Beverwijk
- Iron rod incident
