= 2014 De Kuip fireworks incident =

Instance of football hooliganism in the Netherlands

The Fireworks incident (Dutch, "Vuurwerkincident") was a case of football hooliganism which took place on Easter Sunday, 20 April 2014 in De Kuip, Rotterdam, during the KNVB Cup final match between AFC Ajax and PEC Zwolle. Mass amounts of fireworks, flares and smoke bombs were launched into the penalty box around Ajax goalkeeper Kenneth Vermeer in the early minutes of the match, which had been thrown onto the pitch by the Ajax hooligan firm VAK410 twice in the early build up of the game. After a 30-minute recess in which marketing director Edwin van der Sar addressed the crowd, Ajax would go on to lose the match 5–1 to Zwolle.

== Background ==
On 20 April 2014, Easter Sunday the 2013–14 KNVB Cup final was played at De Kuip, the home stadium of Feyenoord, between Ajax and PEC Zwolle. Ajax had previously eliminated arch-rivals Feyenoord at home 3–1 in the Quarter-finals, and PEC Zwolle had advanced to the Cup final, having only been promoted from the Eerste Divisie the previous season. The match began with a long-distance 'cannonball' of a shot from Ricardo van Rhijn from long range which provided the one goal advantage for Ajax in the third minute of the game.

== Fireworks and flares ==
Following the opening goal several fireworks, flares and smoke bombs were launched into the penalty box around Ajax keeper Kenneth Vermeer, from the Ajax supporters section behind the goal by members of VAK410, during PEC Zwolle's first attack on goal. The amount of fire and smoke on the pitch made the match impossible, while endangering the lives of the players on the pitch. Match referee Bas Nijhuis was forced to interrupt the match, taking a 30-minute recess, with the players retreating to the changing rooms. Ajax marketing director Edwin van der Sar was furious with the crowd and took to the pitch to plea with the supporters to get them to stop.

== Ensuing match play ==
The match resumed after the break with PEC Zwolle taking immediate control of the game and finding the equalizer only three minutes later. New Zealander Ryan Thomas goal in the eighth minute of the game was vital, as Thomas cut past Van Rhijn and surprised Ajax keeper Vermeer with a shot into the near corner. Ajax defender Niklas Moisander had made contact with the ball but it was not enough to prevent the equalizer. Mere minutes later Zwolle took the lead after Ryan Thomas scored from a rebound off the post in the twelfth minute, resulting from a free kick from Maikel van der Werff, making it 2–1 for De Blauwvingers. PEC Zwolle never let up pressure and increased the margin when Guyon Fernandez, who was on loan from Feyenoord, scored the third goal in the 22nd minute off an assist from Mateusz Klich and then moments later headed in his second goal into the far corner off a cross from Bram van Polen in the 34th minute. The two teams then headed into halftime with a scoreline of 4–1 in favour of Zwolle.

Ajax manager Frank de Boer was visibly infuriated from the sidelines but there was little his team could do. While his club were at the top of the league table, one point away from winning their fourth consecutive (33rd overall) national title, winning the Cup would seem impossible considering the performance of his team in the first half, with the only chance coming from a shot by Bojan Krkić which hit the crossbar. In the second half Zwolle team captain Bram van Polen scored the fifth and final goal for PEC, making it 5–1 after converting a successful corner kick from close range. PEC Zwolle had several more great opportunities to score, with missed chances by both Thomas and Fernandez. Ajax would lose to PEC Zwolle for the first time since 1988, with PEC Zwolle qualifying to compete in the 2014–15 UEFA Europa League, thus making their continental debut. PEC Zwolle had previously played in two other Dutch Cup finals, but secured their first against the Dutch champions, under manager Ron Jans. The club went on to make a boat tour in Zwolle to celebrate the following day on Easter Monday.

== Consequences ==
Following the incident, 19 Ajax supporters were arrested as the fanatical core had caused mass destruction of the Stadion Feijenoord, breaking the chairs in the stands and writing graffiti everywhere, having even defaced the restrooms with faecal matter. The damage was reportedly estimated to be around €60,000, which was then billed to the Amsterdam club. The supporters group F-side distanced themselves from the actions in disagreement, as VAK410 made repeated attempts to apologize for their actions from the firms own website. It was later revealed that the supporter groups had left in three busses from Amsterdam to Rotterdam, while the bus that was transporting the F-side was stopped and held at a rest stop for one and a half hours. VAK410 then tried to stall the match in protest of the police action. This was however never communicated between the supporters groups at the time of the incident. The Supportersvereniging Ajax released an official statement distancing themselves from the actions as well, calling it unacceptable behavior.

Private investigator John van den Heuvel later revealed the involvement of the notorious criminal Martin P. alias Polletje in the fireworks incident in Rotterdam as one of the culprits. Polletje had been sentenced to life in prison in 2000 for his involvement in a quadruple murder case at the sex club Esther in Haarlem. After an appeal the sentence was reduced to 15 years, of which he served half the time based on good behavior. The police reportedly also have records showing that Polletje was blackmailing other members of the hardcore of Ajax to pay a percentage of the profits made from sold merchandise. Polletje himself had barely escaped an attempt on his life, in an attempted murder case in Badhoevedorp in 2012.

Ajax revealed that they would not bring any supporters to away matches in Rotterdam when the team contest in De Klassieker for the following three years as a result of their actions. The KNVB (Royal Dutch Football Association) have not yet voiced their ruling over the incident, but immediately forbade 400 Ajax supporters from attending the Eredivisie away match against Heracles Almelo the following week as a result of their actions. The match in which Ajax could win the national championship. An additional 100-150 tickets to the match were subsequently cancelled as well.
