= Iron rod =

Iron rod or rod of iron may refer to:

- Wrought iron, an iron alloy used in building and heavy construction
- Tree of life vision in the Book of Mormon, a rod of iron symbolizing the word of God
- Iron rod incident, a case of football hooliganism which took place on 27 September 1989 at the De Meer Stadion of Dutch football club Ajax Amsterdam
- Rod of Iron Ministries, a religious group led by Hyung Jin Moon and named after a passage in Revelation 2
