= A.F.C.A (hooligans) =

Dutch hooligan firm linked to A.F.C. Ajax

A.F.C.A Hooligans
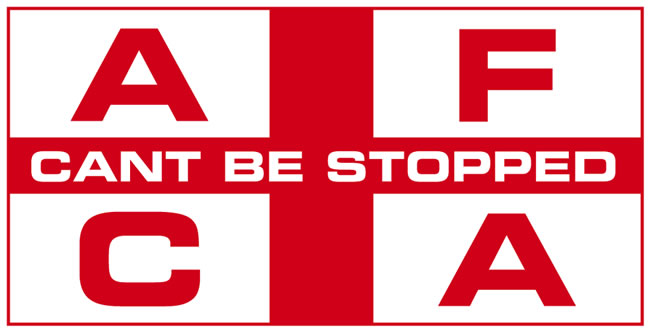
- Named after: Amsterdamsche Football Club Ajax
- Founding location: Amsterdam
- Territory: Amsterdam and surrounding towns
- Criminal activities: Football hooliganism, riots, fighting, arson, drug trafficking,
- Allies: BCS-R.S.C. Anderlecht, Gate 11-Maccabi Tel Aviv F.C., Judegang & Ultras Opravcy-Cracovia
- Rivals: S.C.F, FIIIR, R.J.K-Feyenoord Rotterdam. Bunnikside, Midden Noord

A.F.C.A (or just AFCA) is a Dutch hooligan firm linked to A.F.C. Ajax. In the past the Ajax fans consists only out of one firm: the well known F-side. Nowadays there are more firms active such as VAK410. Although they are separated groups, there is cooperation between them. This is especially the case during riots, the AFCA firm then consists of a mix with members from all of the groups, and they operate as one firm: the AFCA firm.

== Main groups ==
The main groups within the AFCA hooligan firm are:

- Oude Garde (Old school members from Vak-F)
- F-side
- Vak M (founded as a sub-group from the F-side, now probably the group with the most influence due to their reputation)
- ULTRAS AmsterdamVAK410
- AFCA Youth (3rd generation)
- AFCA 4th (4th generation)
- Amsterdam Hooligans 5th (5th generation)
- GajesGang
- AFCA Maluku

== Notes ==
- In the media the AFCA Supportersclub is often wrongly accused of being the same as the AFCA Hooligans. The AFCA supporters club is in no way connected with the AFCA Hooligans other than their love for Ajax.
- The A.F.C.A (clothing) was founded as clothing especially for the hardcore (hooligan) element of the Ajax supporters. Nowadays regular fans wear the same clothing.
