= Jan Baas =

Dutch politician

J.G.A. "Jan" Baas (born 24 October 1950) is a Dutch politician. He is a member of the Labour Party (PvdA).

Baas was an alderman of Beverwijk from 1990 to 1996 and mayor of Wieringen from 1996 to 2004. Since 2004 he has been mayor of Enkhuizen.
