= Beverwijk =

- Municipality
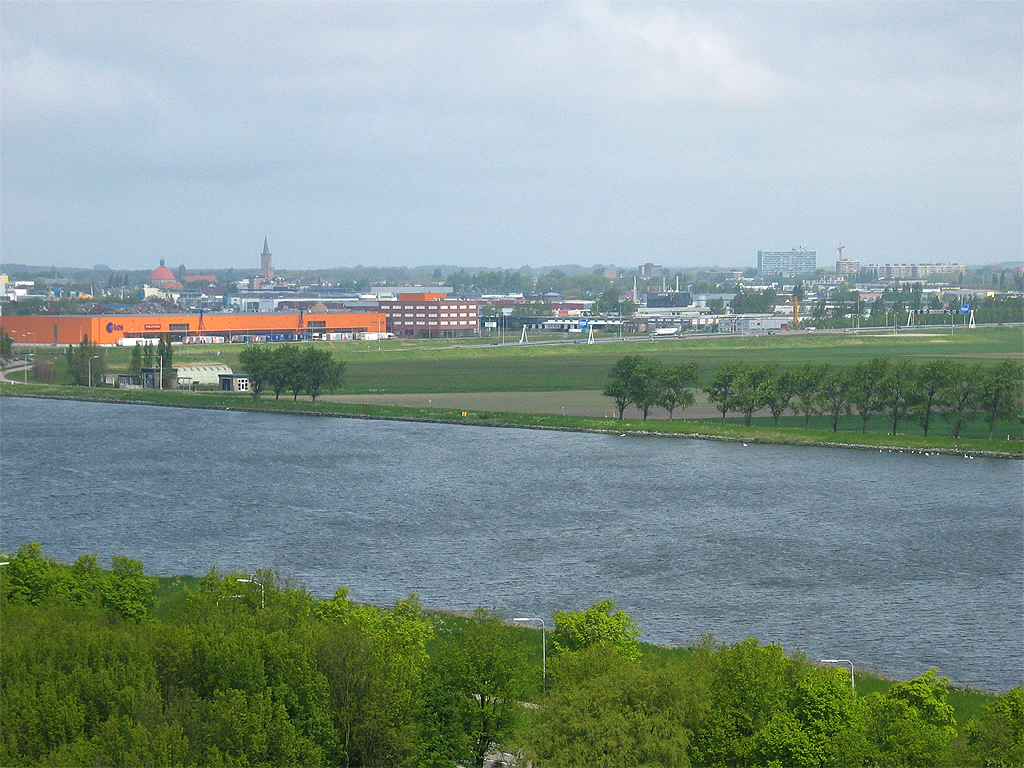
- Beverwijk as seen from the North Sea Canal

- Flag Coat of arms

- Location in North Holland
- Coordinates: 52°29′N 4°39′E
- Country: Netherlands
- Province: North Holland
- Region: Amsterdam metropolitan area

Government
  - Body: Municipal council
  - Mayor: Martijn Smit (PvdA)

Area
  - Total: 20.09 km^{2} (7.76 sq mi)
  - Land: 18.40 km^{2} (7.10 sq mi)
  - Water: 1.69 km^{2} (0.65 sq mi)
- Elevation: 2 m (6.6 ft)

Population (January 2021)
  - Total: 41,863
  - Density: 2,275/km^{2} (5,890/sq mi)
- Demonym: Beverwijker
- Time zone: UTC+1 (CET)
  - Summer (DST): UTC+2 (CEST)
- Postcode: 1940–1949
- Area code: 251
- Website: www.beverwijk.nl

Beverwijk (Dutch pronunciation: [ˌbeːvərˈʋɛik]) is an industrial port city in the Netherlands, in the province of North Holland. The town is located about 20 kilometres (12 mi) northwest of Amsterdam in the Randstad metropolitan area, north of the North Sea Canal very close to the North Sea coast. A railway tunnel and two motorway tunnels cross the canal between Beverwijk and the nearby city of Haarlem on the south side of the canal.

In 1652, a town called Beverwyck was founded in the Dutch colony of New Netherland. That town would become the city of Albany, the state capital of New York.

== Population centres ==
The municipality of Beverwijk consists of two cores, Beverwijk proper and Wijk aan Zee, 5 km (3.1 mi) to the west, right on the coast.

== History ==
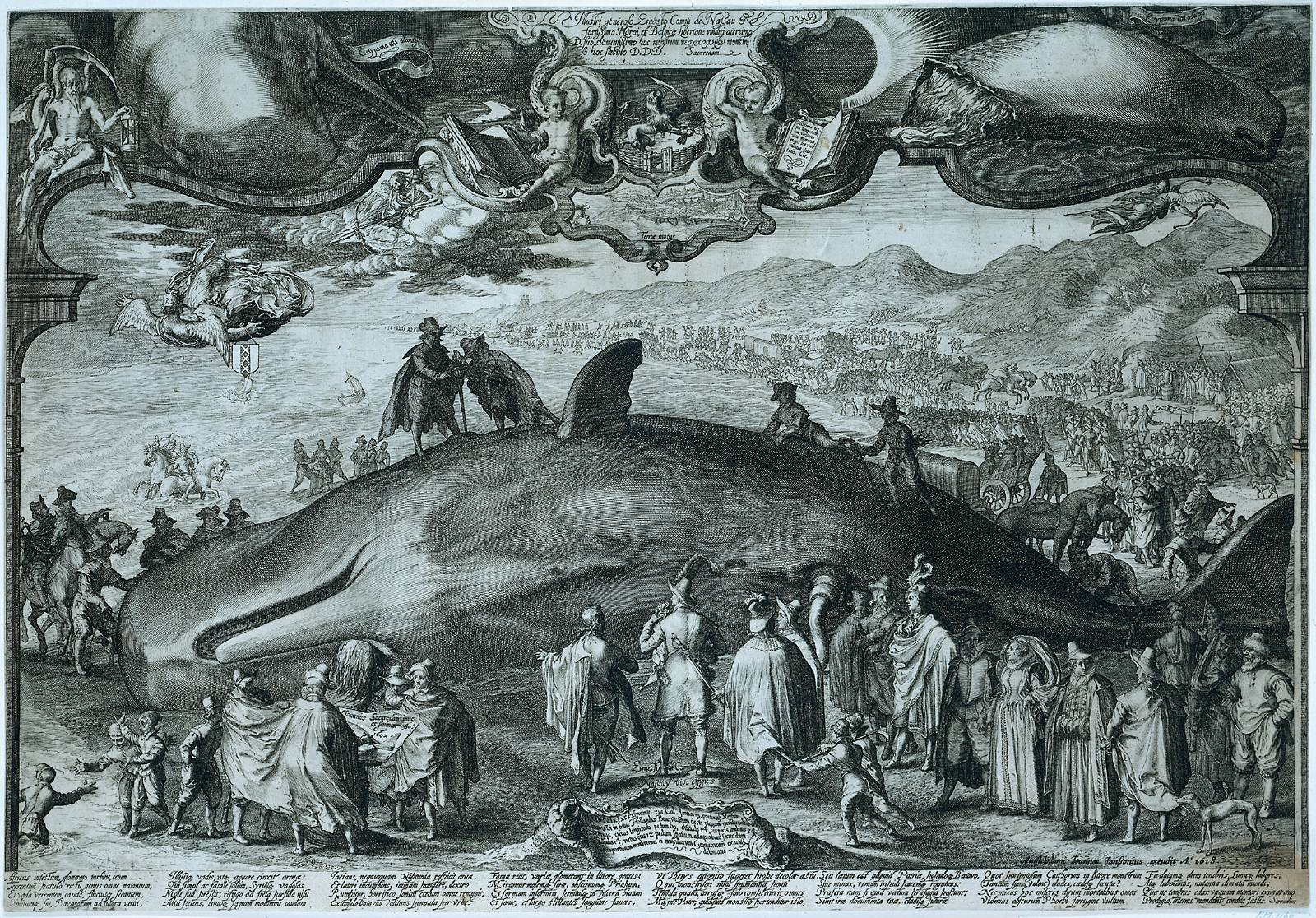
Engraving from 1601 by Jan Saenredam of a beached whale on the coast near Beverwijk

The name Beverwijk comes from Bedevaartswijk, meaning "pilgrimage neighbourhood". The town formed at the Saint Agatha Church which was a pilgrimage location in the Middle Ages. Allegedly Agatha of Sicily appeared there in the 9th century to a virgin from Velsen who was fleeing from the Count of Kennemerland.

In 1276, Beverwijk was granted market rights by Floris V, and in 1298 it was granted city rights by John I, both Counts of Holland.

During the 17th century, wealthy merchants from Amsterdam built their estates, such as Huize Akerendam, Huize Westerhout, and Huize Scheijbeeck, in the scenic dunes surrounding Beverwijk. Or they changed former strongholds in country retreats like Adrichem Castle.

Before the reclamation of the IJ Bay, the narrowest point in the North Holland peninsula was at Beverwijk. Therefore, a defensive line was built there in 1800 following the Battle of Castricum in 1799.

In 1944, during the Second World War, the Germans conducted a house-to-house raid in Beverwijk and Velsen-Noord, seizing nearly 500 persons as hostages to force the murderers of three collaborators to surrender themselves. In all, 63 of them never returned.

Around 1977, the first furniture stores opened along the Parallel Road, forming the first "furniture boulevard" in the Netherlands. By 1981, 10 businesses had been established there. South of the furniture boulevard, the Bazaar was introduced in 1980.

On 23 March 1997, Beverwijk was the location of a clash of two football teams. Supporters of the Dutch football team AFC Ajax met with Feyenoord supporters in what has come to be known as the "Battle of Beverwijk". During this incident, one Ajax supporter was beaten to death.

Since 1997, Special Needs Judo Foundation has organised its annual OBG (Open Beverwijk G-judo) tournament in Sporthal De Walvis, featuring over 1,000 special needs judoka from all over the world. The tournament takes place every year in April.

== Local government ==
The municipal council of Beverwijk consists of 27 seats as of 2026, which are divided as follows:

- Samen Lokaal Beverwijk - 7 seats
- Vrij! - 5 seats
- VVD - 3 seats
- D66 - 3 seats
- GroenLinks / PvdA - 3 seats
- Forum voor Democratie - 3 seats
- CDA - 1 seat
- Ons Beverwijk - 1 seat
- Denk - 1 seat

== Notable residents ==
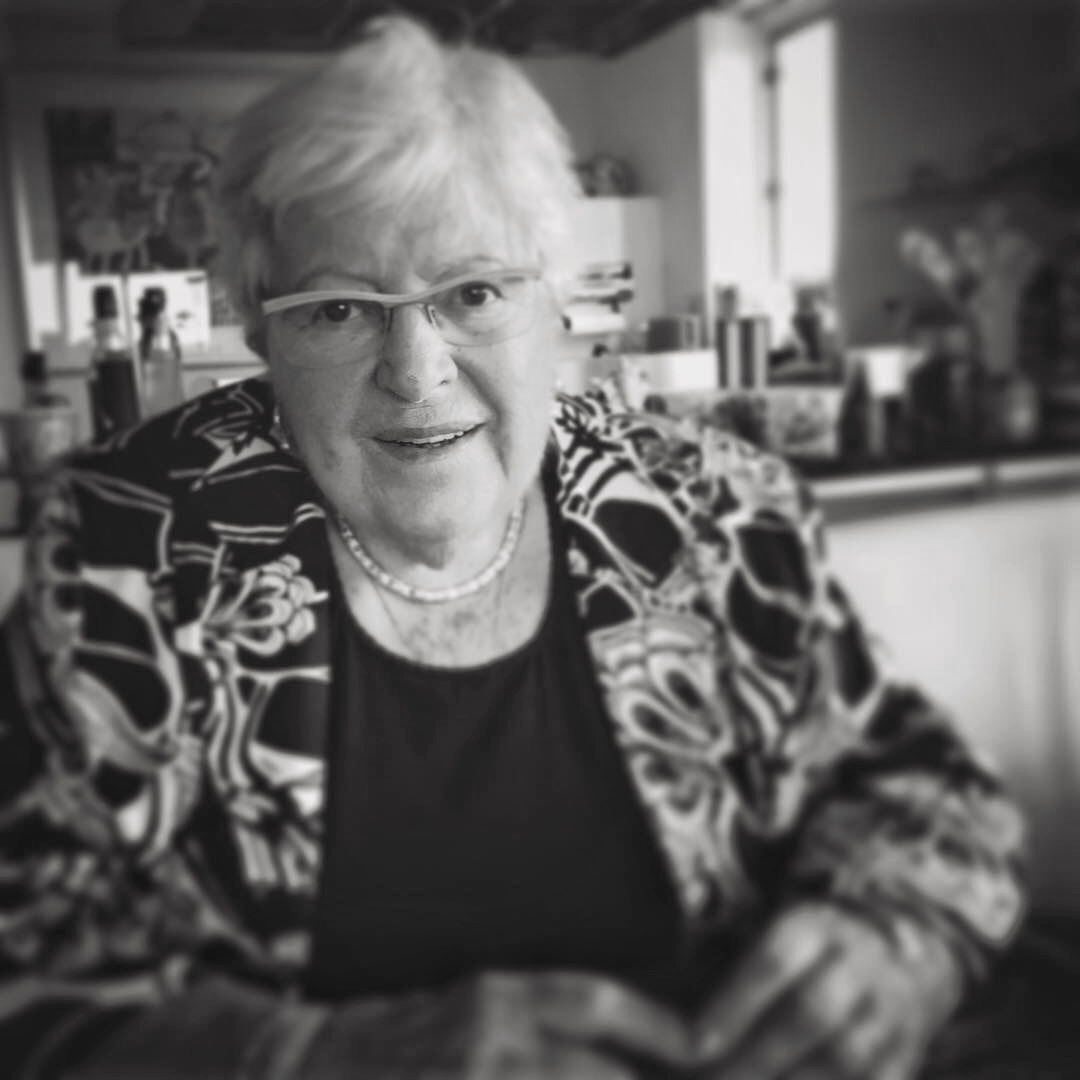
Wil Velders-Vlasblom, 1970

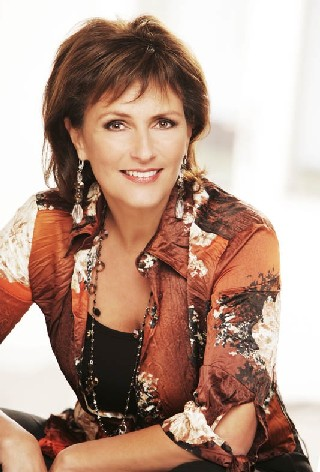
Astrid Joosten, 2010

- Gerard van Velsen (died 1296) Lord of Beverwijk, Noordwijk, and Velsen
- Richard Aertsz (1482–1577) a Dutch Renaissance painter of historical allegories
- Jan Cornelisz Vermeyen (1500-1559) a Dutch Northern Renaissance painter
- Thomas Wijck (1616-1677) a Dutch painter of port views and genre paintings
- Rochus van Veen (1630–1693) was a Dutch Golden Age painter
- Isaac Johannes Lamotius (1646–1718) Governor of Mauritius 1677 to 1692 and an ichthyologist
- Wil Velders-Vlasblom (1930–2019) a politician and woman's rights activist, Mayor of Beverwijk 1986 to 1995
- Albert Boer (1935–2002) the author of Kamp Schoorl
- Henk Tijms (born 1944) a Dutch mathematician and academic
- Jan Baas (born 1950) a Dutch politician, alderman of Beverwijk 1990 to 1996
- Peter Pontiac (1951–2015) a Dutch cartoonist, comics artist and illustrator
- Peter de Wit (born 1958) a Dutch comics artist and cartoonist
- Astrid Joosten (born 1958) a Dutch TV personality and presenter
- Ilse Huizinga (born 1966) a Dutch jazz singer
- Willem de Rooij (born 1969) mixed media artist
- Kim-Lian van der Meij (born 1980) a musical actress, presenter and singer-songwriter

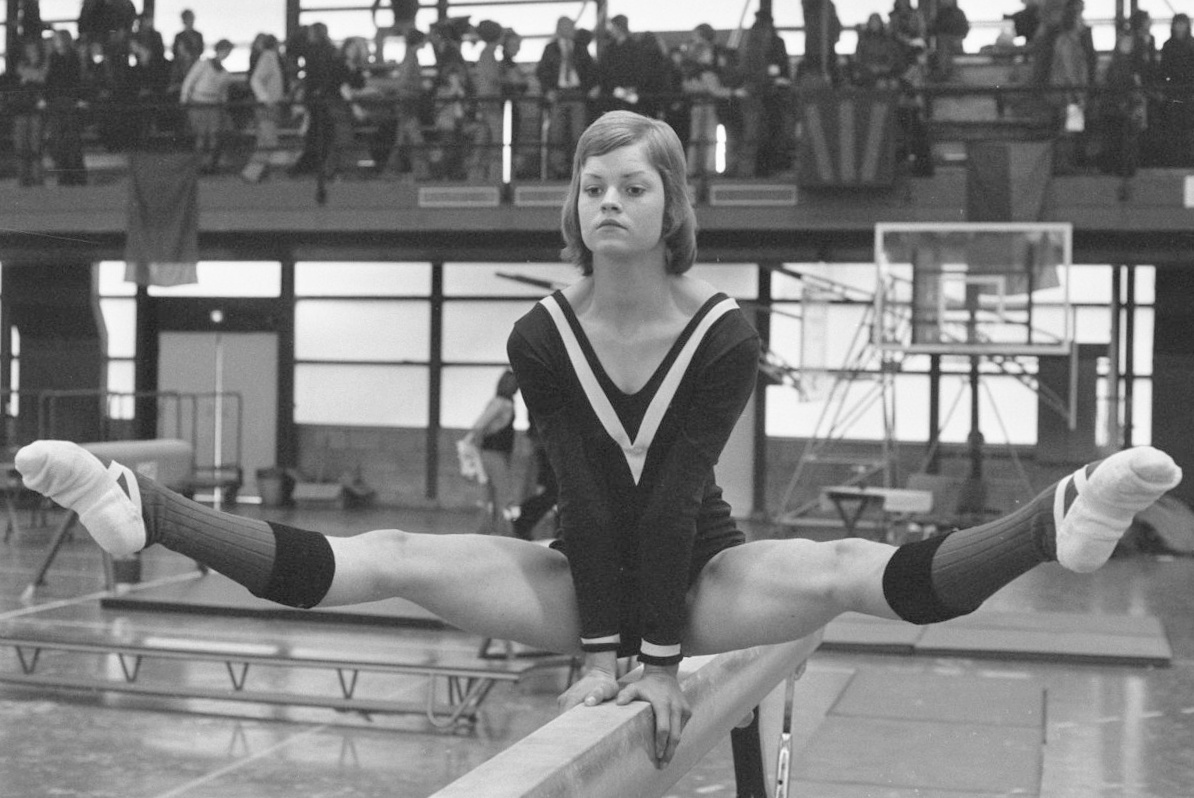
Ans Dekker, 1974

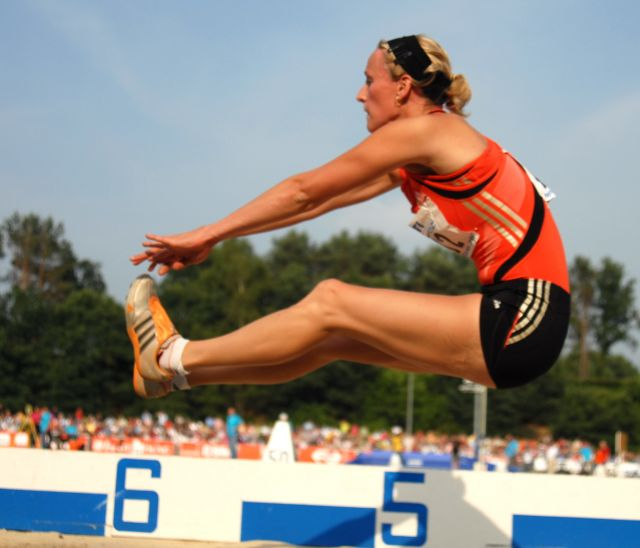
Laurien Hoos, 2007

=== Sport ===
- Cor Tabak (1907–2001) a male weightlifter who competed at the 1928 Summer Olympics
- Ab Geldermans (born 1935) a former professional road bicycle racer and directeur sportif
- Jos Niesten (born 1945) a former marathon speed skater
- Ans Dekker (born 1955) a former artistic gymnast, competed at the 1972 and 1976 Summer Olympics
- Wouly de Bie (born 1958) a former water polo goalkeeper, participated in two Summer Olympics
- Michel Doesburg (born 1968) a retired Dutch professional footballer with over 400 club caps
- Dorus de Vries (born 1980) a retired Dutch football goalkeeper with 431 club caps
- Laurien Hoos (born 1983) a Dutch heptathlete and hurdler, competed at the 2008 Summer Olympics
- Niki Terpstra (born 1984) a Dutch racing cyclist
- Stefan Struve (born 1988) mixed martial artist
- Paul de Lange (born 1981) a retired Dutch footballer with nearly 400 club caps
- Arthur Numan (born 1969) a retired Dutch footballer with 436 club caps
- Daphne van Domselaar (born 2000) goalkeeper for the Netherlands

== Transport ==
- Beverwijk railway station

== Gallery ==
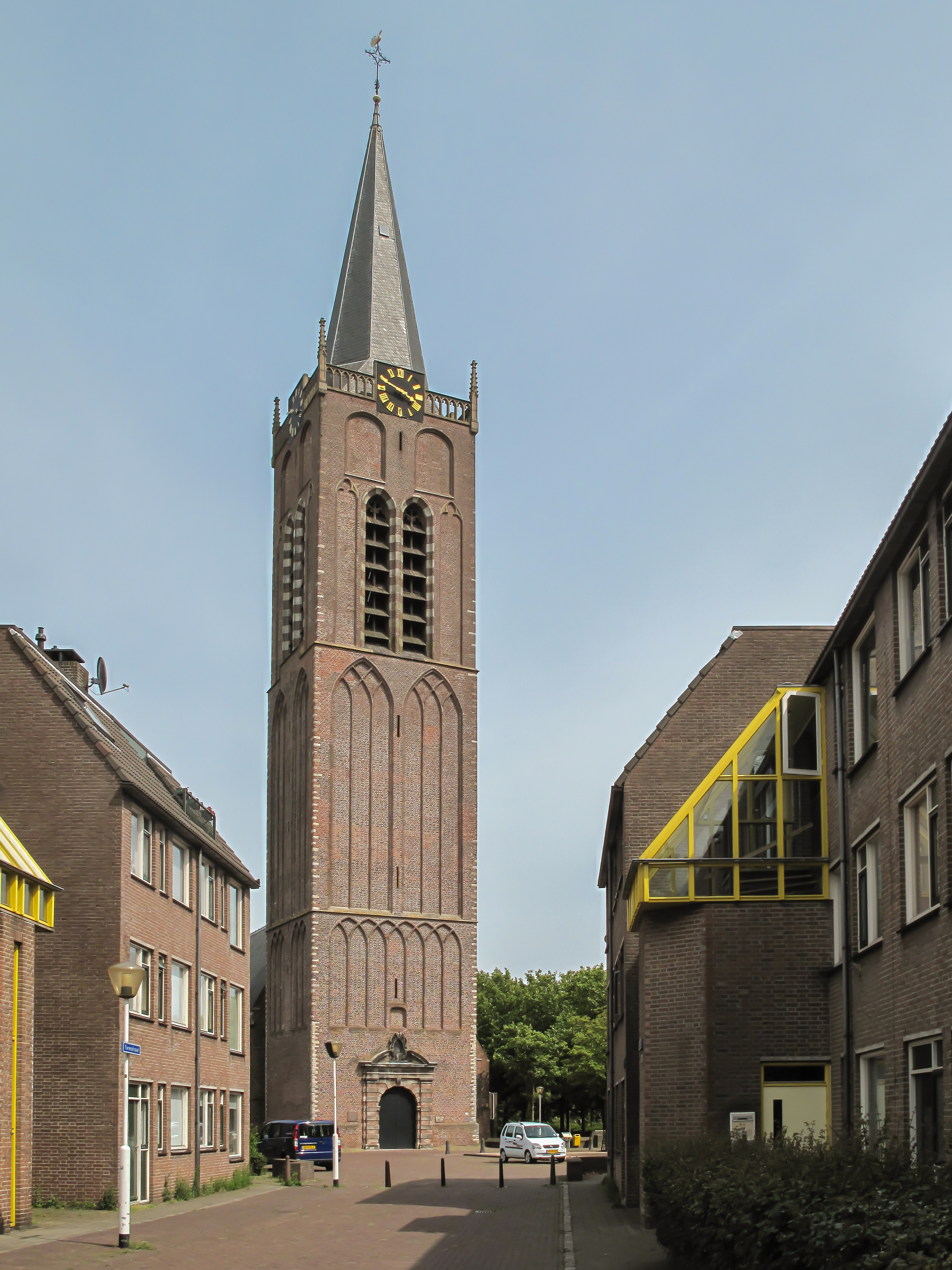
Beverwijk, church: de Grote Kerk

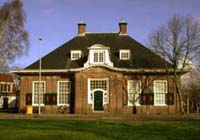
Museumkennemerland

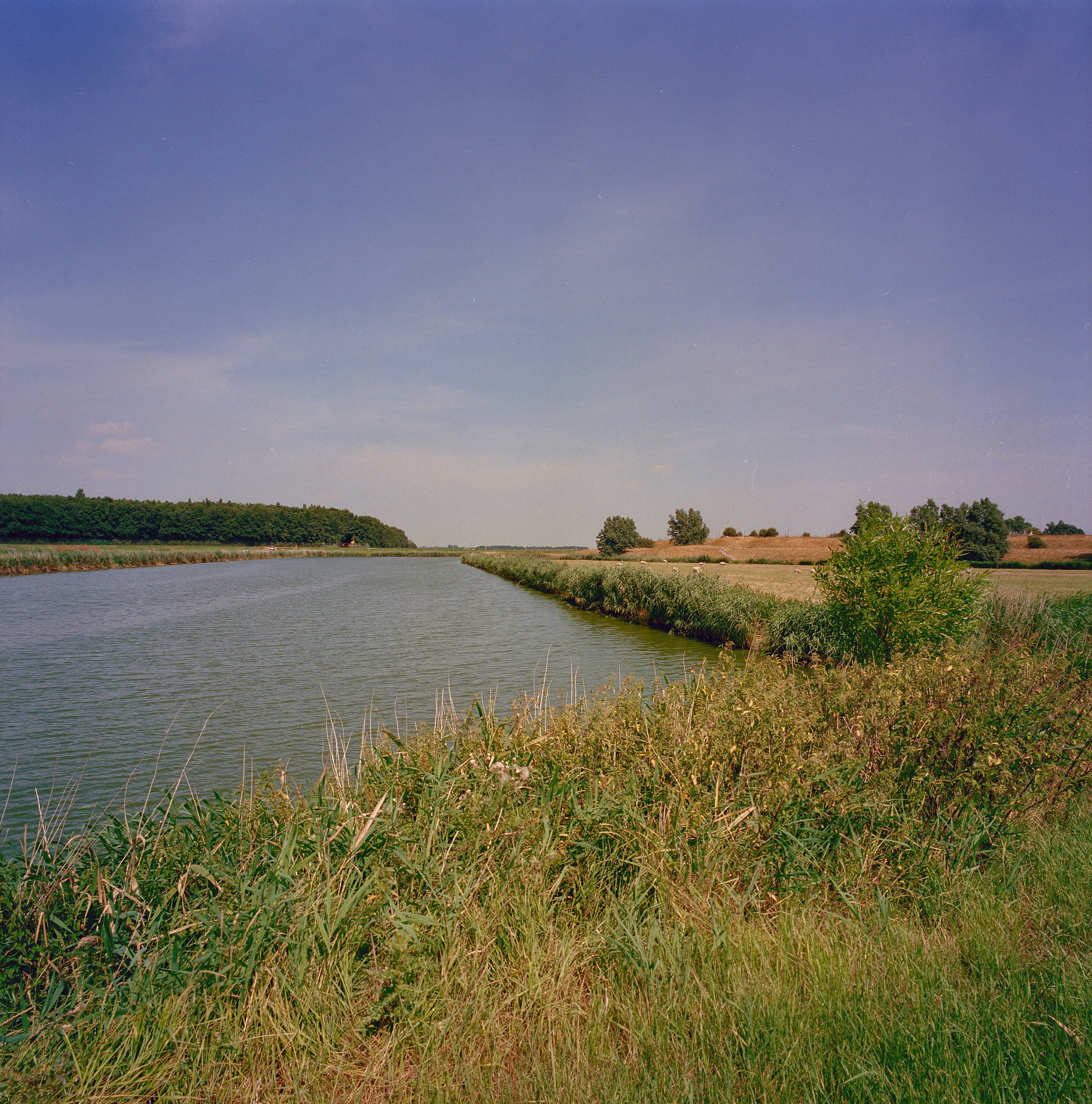
Inundatiekanaal van de Pijp naar de inundatiesluis in de Sint Aagtendijk - Beverwijk

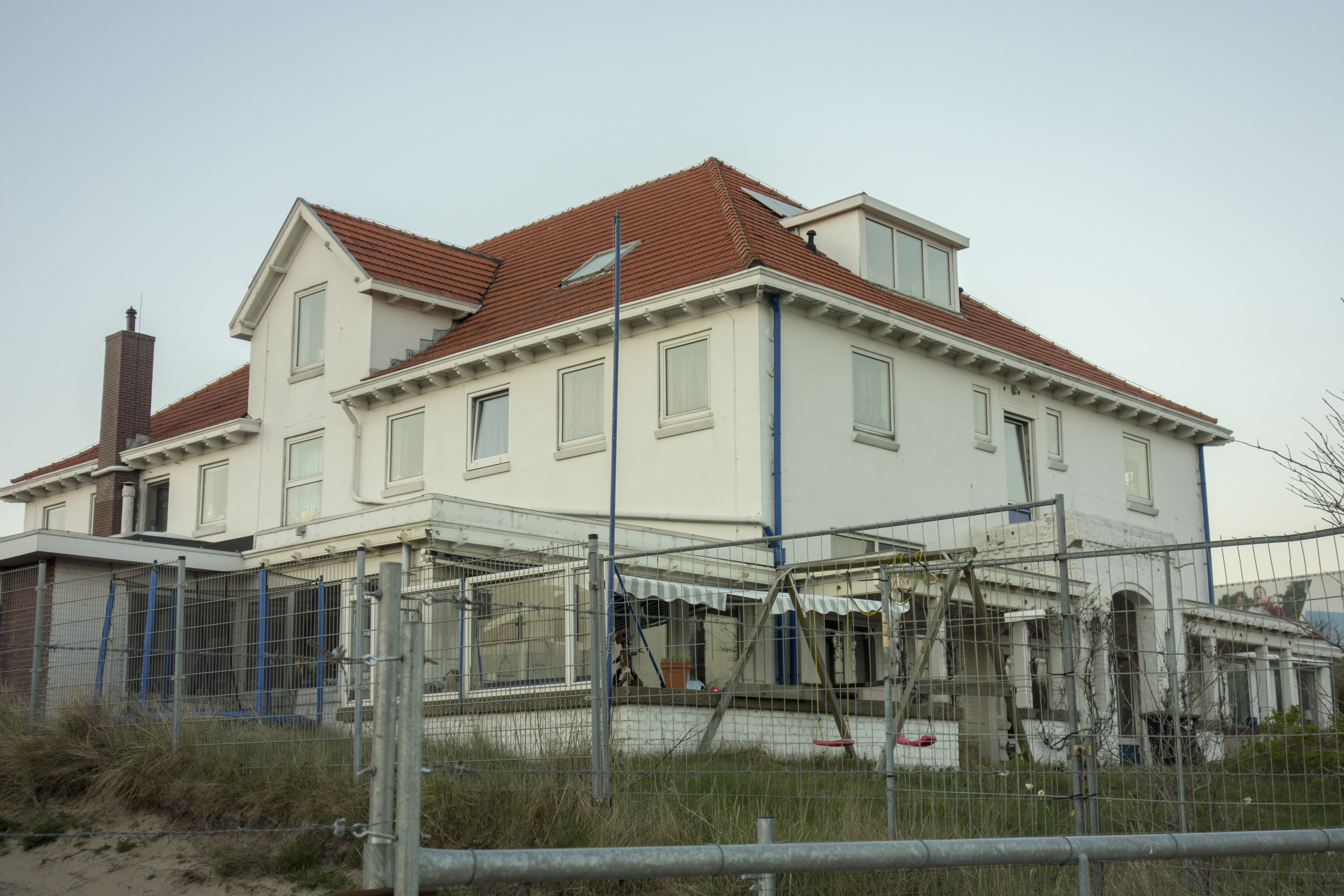
Relweg 57, Wijk aan Zee

== See also ==
- Museum Kennemerland, Beverwijk
