= North Up Alliance =

Dutch football supporter group

Logo of the N.U.A, since 2012

The North Up Alliance ("N.U.A.") is a Dutch football tifosi group associated with AFC Ajax. The name is from their location the stand in Ajax' home stadium Johan Cruyff Arena, namely rows 409 to 414 in the 2nd ring of the Stadium.

== Background ==
North Up Alliance was founded in June 2012 as a collective atmosphere group of the upper North ring of the Stadium. With approximately 300 members occupying rows 409 to 414 of the second ring, the various supporters groups united to create much larger banners, and to help bring more atmosphere near the section for the away supporters. Due to their close proximity to the away supporters section, the group are more restricted then others in the Stadium. The group have reached an acceptable agreement with the club and were granted permission to occupy the Northern ring, as long as they stay within their boundaries and adhere to the guidelines which were agreed upon. Every Thursday night the group actively meet at the Amsterdam ArenA to prepare their massive banners for the weekend. The group distance themselves from the hooligan nature of other groups, such as the F-side and VAK410, but are known in Dutch media for their Tifosi activity, and for the manner in which they deliver messages revolving around Ajax current events. North Up Alliance and the South Crew are also the two groups at Ajax responsible for the graffiti pieces that are found inside the tunnels of the Amsterdam Arena, from the players entrance to the locker rooms.

== See also ==
- F-side
- South Crew
- VAK410
- Tifosi
- Ultras
