= Daniël Dekker =

Dutch disc jockey and radio host

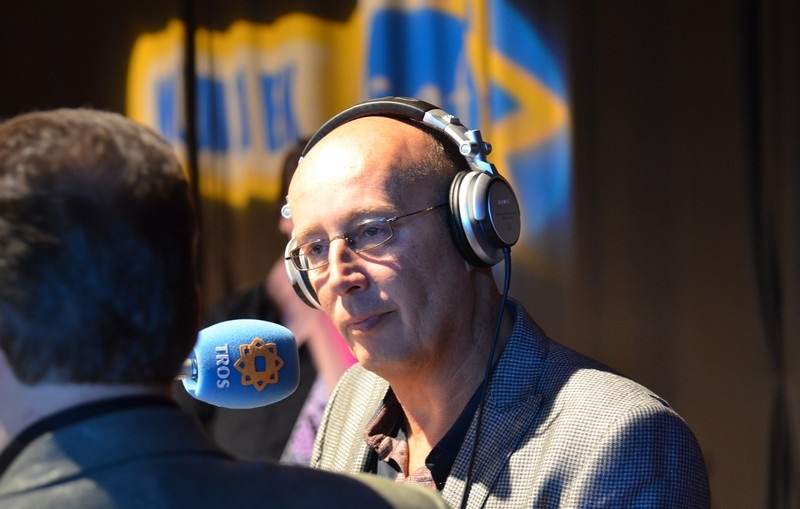
Daniël Dekker

Daniël Dekker (born Henk Bakhuizen on 8 April 1960 in Amsterdam) is a Dutch disc jockey and radio host. In 1980 Dekker began his radio career on Decibel Radio before working for 3FM and Radio 2.

Between 2010 and 2013 he was the Dutch commentator for the Eurovision Song Contest although he was the Dutch radio commentator for the 1990 and 1992 contests.

He is also the chairman of the SVA, the fan club of the Dutch football club Ajax Amsterdam.

== See also ==
- Radio 2
