= South Crew =

Dutch football tifosi group

Logo of South Crew, since 2007

The South Crew ("STH-CRW") is a Dutch football tifosi group associated with AFC Ajax. The name is from their location the stand in Ajax' home stadium Amsterdam Arena, namely Zuid-1 and Zuid-2.

== Background ==
South Crew was founded on 26 August 2007 by hardcore supporters of the club who wanted to help create more atmosphere in the stadiums south end. The group occupied the Zuid-1 and Zuid-2 stands of the Amsterdam ArenA from where they raise massive banners at the beginning of Ajax home matches. Although the group commonly work together with the likes of VAK410 to coordinate much larger spectacles in the stands, due to their close proximity in the stadium, the South Crew do however distance themselves from the hooligan activities of VAK410, as the South Crew restrict their actions to choreography and atmosphere in the stadium and do not partake in the violent clashes as the other Ultras do before and after the games. The South Crew and the North Up Alliance are also the two groups at Ajax responsible for the graffiti pieces that are found inside the tunnels of the Amsterdam Arena, from the players entrance to the locker rooms. The South Crew also organize the South Crew Lottery giving away prizes to the winners, in order to fund the operation and the construction of the massive banners. Known as one of the most popular Tifosi groups in the Netherlands, often finding themselves in Dutch press for the manner in which they present their statements, the South Crew also collaborate with AFC Ajax, Axion and the City of Amsterdam in the annual Ajax Campus initiative. With Ajax Campus, club representatives and members of the South Crew visit various school campuses in and around Amsterdam, teaching children (ages 14–17) how to create banners, which in turn are then displayed in the stands of the South Crew during one of the home matches of Ajax each season.

== See also ==
- F-side
- North Up Alliance
- VAK410
- Tifosi
- Ultras
