= Ajax Business Associates =

The ABA, est. 1991

The Ajax Business Associates (ABA) is an organisation linked to AFC Ajax football club, based in Amsterdam, Netherlands.

The group is independent of the club and consists of a variety of members. With the public being the driving force behind the association, the ABA is the business club of Ajax, the organization contribute to Ajax affairs, as well as help the various corporate endorsers of the club to communicate and collaborate in order to assist in reaching the goals of the club. Founded in 1991, the ABA has been registered in the Chamber of Commerce (V53735) since its inception. The organization also has strong ties to the other supporter clubs of Ajax, namely the SVA and the AFCA Supportersclub. For a small price members of the ABA may also make use the clubs' amenities and luxury suites at the Amsterdam ArenA, reserved for ABA members.

== Events ==
Since 21 February 1997, the ABA hold their own rooming and seating in the ArenA, including the ABA club and lounge, which can be reserved by the members of the ABA to host events. The ABA is also responsible for organizing all travel to National and International away matches of Ajax for its business associates. The ABA also publish a bi-monthly journal called the ABA-Today which is mailed to all is subscribers and members of the ABA. The journal is a magazine with articles surrounding events and on-goings of the club and its supporters. Events surrounding the undertakings of the ABA are highlighted and advertising in the magazine is possible.

The ABA is also responsible for organizing the annual Ajax Business Golf Trophy, an amateur golf tournament that has seen several past and active Ajax players participate against prominent Dutch figures and ABA members. ABA member Harry Kunst won the first edition of the tournament.

== Board and Staff ==
The board consists of the following members:

- Chairman: Roy Klockenbrink
- Treasurer: Henny Kok
- Board member: Frank ter Huurne
- Secretary: Marjolein Pinkster-Butzelaar
- Secretary: Daniëlle Poelstra

== See also ==
- History of AFC Ajax
- AFCA Supportersclub
- Supportersvereniging Ajax
