= Coat of arms of Beverwijk =

Coat of arms of Beverwijk

Coat of arms of the city and municipality of Beverwijk.

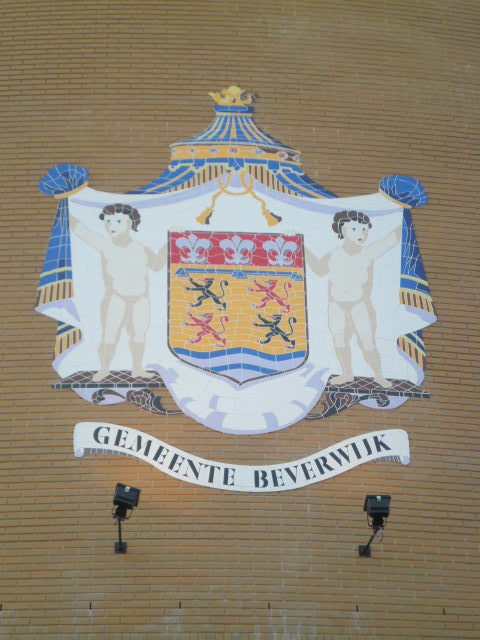
Coat of arms on the facade of the city hall next to the Railway station.

The coat of arms as it was granted in 1818

The coat of arms of Beverwijk is a coat of arms that has been renewed several times. The coat of arms of Beverwijk is the only coat of arms of a Dutch municipality that is surrounded by a cloak. This is highly unusual in the Netherlands, where such a cloak is normally reserved for nobility, the pope and national coats of arms.

== History ==
There are several symbols combined in the coat of arms, amongst them are the three fleurs de lis, who can be found in the oldest known coat of arms of Beverwijk. This oldest coat of arms is actually a seal. This seal dates from 1322 and it shows not three but four fleur de lye standing on top of a shield.

In 1548 and 1561 Beverwijk used three fleur de lye, but underneath these three there are waves and above the fleur de lye two figures of uncertain origin (possibly roosters) and topping those a label. In the same period the city used a second seal depicting only the three fleur de lis. In 1601 a seal was used showing four lions with underneath waves on top of a label and three fleur de lis in the chief. These three fleur de lis are positioned in the formation of 2 + 1. This seal also has supporters in the form of two naked boys holding up a mantle. A seal dating from 1615 has the same scenery except the boys have been swapped for a winged head above the shield.

== Origin ==
The lions in the coat of arms derive form the coat of arms of John of Beaumont, lord of Blois en Wijk. Beverwijk was the capital of the Bailiff Wijk. The fleur de lis are from the old Beverwijk of the 14th century.

== Blazon ==
There are three known blazons from either the city or the municipality of Beverwijk. The first by the High Councill of Nobility recorded blazon was:

An escutcheon gules, charged with three golden lilies, standing 2 and 1; the lower with 4 lions of gold. A label of silver with 3 pendants over the entire escutcheon. The coat of arms is covered by a tent azure decorated of gold en held on both sides by an angel.

— High Councill of Nobility

This blazon is about the coat of arms of 26 June 1816. The second coat of arms is of 10 November 1899, a small number of changed have been made, amongst them are the supporters. This blazon is as follows:

In gold under a separate standing label azure four lions, the first and fourth of sable, tongued and nailed of gules, the second and third lion of gules, tonged and nailed of azure (Beaumont); a chef gules loaded with three fleur de lis (city of Beverwijk) and a waving base (champagne in French), wavy barry of four azure and silver. The escutcheon is placed on a support of natural wood colour and held by two naked boys, they hold up on both sides a white lined and bordered with gold fringe mantle with baldachin azure.

— High Councill of Nobility

The blazon was changed on 24 Octobre 1936, but the actual coat of arms wasn't changed. The new blazon was needed because the municipality of Beverwijk was merged with the municipality of Wijk aan Zee en Duin.
