= Ivar Vičs =

Dutch graffiti artist

DR. RAT
- Born: Juris Tjerk Emiles Ivars Vičs; 21 May 1960; Amsterdam, Netherlands
- Died: 29 June 1981 (aged 21); Amsterdam, Netherlands
- Known for: Graffiti, Vandalism, Punk rock

Juris Tjerk Emiles Ivars Vičs, "DR. RAT" (21 May 1960 — 29 June 1981) was a graffiti artist from Amsterdam, Netherlands. Since his early years as a graffiti writer in the 1970s Ivar was tagging the name "DR. RAT" pioneering the movement in the Netherlands. He was a well known supporter of the association football club AFC Ajax, and would commonly tag "AJAKS" next to his name, misspelling it on purpose. He is largely considered the pioneer of the graffiti movement in the country, emerging out of the punk rock scene of the late 1970s.

== Biography ==
Born in Amsterdam 21 May 1960 to a Latvian father and a Dutch mother who were both studying at the Gerrit Rietveld Academie, he was the first known graffiti artist in the Netherlands, and played a major role in the punk rock scene in Amsterdam in the late 1970s. He made his first graffiti in Hondecoeterstraat as a child. It was near Nicolaas Maesstraat, where he then lived with his parents. Together with Diana Ozon he founded the famed punk club DDT666 (Dirty Dutch Trix 666), and was also a contributor the fanzine de Koekrant dedicated to punk rock and street culture, while working on other art related projects as well. The graffiti culture was born in the Netherlands at the same time it was born in the US, but is connected with the punk subculture rather than with hip-hop as it is in New York.

He had a short lasting relationship with German singer and actress Nina Hagen, who had advised him to change his name to "DR. ART". Aside from the pseudonyms Dr. Rat and Dr. Art, Vičs other known aliases include Fritz Zanzibar, Stanley Sneeuwschoen de Verschrikkelijke, and Dr. Death, with which he would commonly sign his paintings. A majority of DR. RAT's work in Amsterdam is no longer visible.

His contemporaries largely consider him as a cult figure and an enfant terrible. Ivar Vičs was always seeking out the extremities in life, frequently abusing drugs and alcohol which eventually led to his untimely death. After his passing Diana Ozon dedicated a poem to him, punk rock band "The Helmettes" wrote a song dedicated to Dr. Rat, and Nina Hagen released the song "Dr. Art" dedicated to Ivar as well. Rare footage of Dr. Rat was featured in the 2006 documentary film Kroonjuwelen, and in 2011, journalist Martijn Haas published a biography of Ivar Vičs under the title Dr. Rat, godfather of Dutch graffiti.

== Biopic ==
Independent film director Fedor Sendak, was reportedly working on a biographical film about Dr. Rat. The film was scheduled to be released in 2013.

== Bibliography ==
- (in Dutch) nl: Martijn Haas, Dr. Rat, Godfather van de Nederlandse graffiti, Lebowski, Amsterdam, 2011, ISBN 978-90-488-0851-9
