= 1999 Rotterdam riots =

1999 civil disorder in the Netherlands

The 1999 Rotterdam riots refers to serious riots and clashes between Dutch security forces and football hooligans in Rotterdam, the Netherlands on 26 April 1999.

== Riots ==
Feyenoord football club won the Dutch title (1998-99 Eredivisie) on 25 April having beaten NAC Breda in a game. In celebration a large street party ceremony of up to 250,000 people took place in Coolsingel in Rotterdam city centre. Trouble from about 100 to 150 youngsters and hooligans soon broke out who clashed with police on Stadsplein. Shortly after, shops and property were smashed in wide-scale looting in Lijnbaan, with windows of 93 stores smashed.

Riot police used water cannons to disperse the crowd. Officers were also forced to open fire, shooting four hooligans. Altogether 16 people were injured, whilst 80 were arrested. It is thought hooligans fired back at police.

These were some of the worst instances of hooligan violence in the country.

== Aftermath ==
The violence caused 10 million guilders in damages. Furthermore, four people were hospitalised, including a Feyenoord supporter who was shot in the stomach. It was later reported that most of the hooligans were simply opportunistic, with only loose connections to the football club.

The riots were yet another troubled event in the lead up of the Netherlands co-hosting UEFA Euro 2000, coming two years after the infamous Battle of Beverwijk, as well as widescale riots and fighting in Rotterdam during the 1998 Dutch cup final between supporters of AFC Ajax, PSV Eindhoven and Feyenoord. Furthermore, a friendly match between the Netherlands and Morocco in Arnhem on 21 April 1999, days before the riots in Rotterdam, involved a group of Moroccan fans invading the pitch and violence between Moroccan youth and police in the city of Rotterdam.

Bild Zeitung, a German tabloid newspaper, made an article at the time asking "Is Holland safe enough for Euro 2000?"

== See also ==
- Afrikaanderwijk riots
