= Sven Westendorp =

Graffiti artist

HIGH
- Born: Sven Westendorp; 22 December 1969; Amsterdam, Netherlands
- Died: 17 August 2011 (aged 41); Amsterdam, Netherlands
- Known for: Graffiti, Vandalism, Hooliganism, Crime, Fashion design
- Website: www.afca.nl/sven-king-high/

Sven Westendorp, "HIGH" (December 22, 1969 — August 17, 2011) was a criminal, graffiti artist, and designer from Amsterdam, Netherlands. Since his early years as a graffiti writer in the 1980s Sven was tagging the name "HIGH" helping to pioneer the movement in the Netherlands. He was a well known supporter of the association football club AFC Ajax, and a member of the hooligan firm F-side. He is also the creator of the A.F.C.A clothing brand.

== Biography ==
Born in Amsterdam, Sven Westendorp got involved with hooliganism and graffiti in the mid 1980s when he started tagging the name "HIGH" together with "C.B.S." crew, which stands for Criminal Bombing Squad or Can't Be Stopped in the tunnels, on trains and on walls around the city. CBS grew to become one of the most notorious graffiti crews in the Netherlands, helping to pioneer the movement, as shown in Kroonjuwelen, a documentary film on Graffiti in the Dutch Capital. A well known supporter of Ajax, Sven was a key member of the F-side, a hooligan firm associated with the club from Amsterdam. In 1997 he was commissioned by AFC Ajax N.V. and with permission of the Amsterdam Arena, together with fellow writers DELTA, OASE, RHYME and GASP to create a graffiti mural dedicated to the club. The mural has been situated behind the goal line along the south-end of the Stadium where the F-side are situated ever since. HIGH also started a clothing line for his own designs dedicated to hooliganism and Ajax, initially starting by creating T-shirts, he soon expanded into all areas of fashion, to footwear and eventually accessories. He funded his A.F.C.A brand with the success of his company Ticketbureau Ticket Unlimited, an important vendor for tickets to concerts and sporting events in the Netherlands. He also opened an official A.F.C.A store in the neighborhood of Hoogoorddreef (Zuidoost).

Known in the Netherlands for his involvement in several criminal cases, some which were never resolved, with most cases revolving around graffiti, drug trafficking and his activity as a hooligan since the mid-eighties. He was no stranger to trouble, and his A.F.C.A store was eventually set on fire in 2009. On 12 August 2011 Sven was gunned down in front of his house on Borgloonstraat in the neighborhood of Slotervaart (Nieuw-West) by a man on a scooter. He was then kept in an artificial coma in hope that he would recover from his injuries. On 17 August 2011, the doctors who were treating Sven for his gunshot wounds pulled the plug on his life support. He was survived by a daughter. On 18 November 2011 it was announced that Rick Halman was the prime suspect in the murder of Sven Westendorp, who was arrested on 20 April 2012 as also a suspect in another murder.

American hip-hop and Street culture magazine Complex Magazine, listed HIGH as the 9th most influential graffiti artist in their Top 25 Graffiti writers from Amsterdam article in December 2011.

== See also ==
- A.F.C.A (clothing)
- F-side
