= Kroonjuwelen =

- Produced by: Stunned Film
- Cinematography: Tjitte Jan Nieuwkoop
- Edited by: Chris van Oers
- Music by: Big Marty & Marshall Blueberry; Combo Di Conjo; Delic; DJ Automatic; I-Wah; Kubus; Men-O-Dee
- Production company: Stunned Film
- Distributed by: TopNotch / PIAS
- Release date: October 11, 2006
- Running time: 76 minutes
- Country: Netherlands
- Language: Dutch

Kroonjuwelen - Hard Times, Good Times, Better Times (English: Crown jewels) is a 2006 documentary film produced and directed by independent Dutch film crew Stunned Film.

This film premiered 11 October 2006 at the Paradiso in Amsterdam. The film is entirely spoken in Dutch, but English subtitles are shown.

On Saturday, 14 October 2006 the film premiered on national television, when it was broadcast by MTV Netherlands.

The film continues to receive screenings at film festivals around the World, such as at the Tate Modern in London, U.K. at the Street Art Exposition in 2008.

== Synopsis ==
In the 2006 documentary "Kroonjuwelen" is a production of Stunned Film. A collective of designers, multimedia developers and filmmakers headed by Erwin Bok. The idea for the film was brought into existence at the Mokum Master graffiti reunion in 2004 in Amsterdam. An event where the graffiti writers of Amsterdam gather to redefine the art form. The film sheds light on the Dutch graffiti scene, specifically the scene in and around Amsterdam, with rare video footage dating from 1978 to 2005. Stunned Film follows various known graffiti writers and features interviews with well-known artists. The film covers the birth of Graffiti in the Dutch Capital from out of the punk and squatting scene of the city in the late seventies, and into the emergence of hip-hop culture in the Netherlands in the early eighties when graffiti in the Netherlands took to the trains, following the evolution of the art form up to modern artists.

== Cast ==
- AGAIN
- ALIEN
- ANGEL, member of the 'USA crew', appears in the book, not in the movie
- DAZE
- DE ZOOT
- DELTA, member of the 'USA crew'
- Diana Ozon
- DR. RAT
- HIGH
- Hugo Kaagman
- JAZ, member of the 'USA crew'
- JEZIS, member of the 'USA crew'
- JOKER, member of the 'USA crew'
- QUIK
- RHYME
- SHOE, member of the 'USA crew'
- VENDEX
- ZAP

== Music ==
- KUBUS
- DELIC
- MEN-O-DEE

== Release ==
The film was later released on DVD 14 May 2007. The DVD release comes in a 48-page linen hardcover book, which features several photographs from the early years of graffiti in Amsterdam.

== See also ==
- Dutch hip hop
