= A.F.C.A (clothing) =

Dutch clothing brand

- Type: Independent
- Industry: Fashion
- Headquarters: Amsterdam, Netherlands
- Key people: Sven 'High" Westendorp, founder and CEO
- Products: Clothing, footwear, accessories
- Owner: AFCA Supportersclub
- Website: Official website

A.F.C.A (also styled as " *A.F.C.A (Can't Be Stopped) ") is a brand of urban lifestyle clothing founded by Sven Westendorp, a Dutch fashion designer, graffiti artist and supporter of association football club AFC Ajax. His brand has been popular since the mid 2000s and moved into the mainstream urban culture in the late 2000s. It is most often associated with association football. The style is based on graffiti art, hip-hop, association football culture, hooliganism and Ajax Amsterdam.

== History ==
The creation of A.F.C.A came into being from selling t-shirts and doing graffiti. Sven "High" Westendorp began doing graffiti with C.B.S. in the tunnels and on the trains in Amsterdam in the early 1980s and founded his clothing brand A.F.C.A years later. A prominent F-sider, he eventually expanded from Clothing to footwear, and accessories. He funded his clothing line with the success of his company Ticketbureau Ticket Unlimited, an important company for concert tickets and football matches in the Netherlands. On 24 December 2009 the A.F.C.A outlet store in Hoogoorddreef (Zuidoost) was set on fire. After he died on 12 August 2011 the AFCA Supportersclub continue to manufacture his line with the proceeds going to his widow and daughter.

== See also ==
- AFCA Supportersclub
