= Lanza (Chilean slang term) =

- Years active: 1940/1950 - present
- Territory: Chile, Spain, France, Netherlands, Austria, Germany
- Ethnicity: Chileans
- Activities: pickpocketing, shoplifting, burglaries

In Chile, a skilled pickpocket is known as a lanza, ("spear" in English). Most lanza members come from impoverished neighborhoods.

Chilean journalist Eduardo Labarca^{(es)}, who has written three books about these criminals, reports that lanza activity dates back to at least the 1940s and 1950s. Labarca describes them as "masters of disguise," able to blend in seamlessly with different groups in society by altering their appearance and accents. However, he notes that the younger generation of lanza members is more violent and audacious.

Today, lanza gangs operate in several countries, including Spain, the Netherlands, Germany, Austria, and France. They are widely recognized as a highly skilled and professional criminal organization, with both the FBI and Scotland Yard referring to them as "the best thieves in the world".
