= Supportersvereniging Ajax =

Supporters' club

Supportersvereniging Ajax logo

The Supportersvereniging Ajax (SVA) (English: "Supporters Club Ajax"), also known as Ajax Life, is an independent supporters' organization associated with AFC Ajax, the football club based in Amsterdam, Netherlands.

The SVA brings together a diverse community of fans, each known as an Ajacied, though their involvement with the club can vary. The organization serves the needs of all its members, whether they are season ticket holders (including away card holders), occasional match attendees or supporters who follow the club through media platforms.

SVA members are spread across the Netherlands, with an active branch in Belgium. With a membership base ranging from 110,000 to 135,000, it is the largest supporters' club in the Netherlands. The average age of its members is 35, and approximately 9% of the members are season ticket holders.

In addition to its domestic activities, Supportersvereniging Ajax is a member of Football Supporters Europe (FSE), a prominent platform representing the interests of football supporters and communicating them to UEFA.

== Events ==
The SVA is primarily responsible for organizing events like the annual Ajax Open Training Day. This event, held at the beginning of each season, allows fans to meet the new Ajax squad members in the Amsterdam Arena. It takes place in and around the team's home stadium and the nearby training ground, Sportpark De Toekomst. The event attracts thousands of spectators each year and is one of the largest pre-season events for the Amsterdam-based club.

The supporters' club frequently appear on Dutch media to address issues such as stadium bans, which prevent supporters from attending away matches due to past incidents.

== Ajax Life ==
The SVA is also responsible for the Ajax Life website and the Ajax Life newspaper, a bi—weekly publication with 20 issues published per year. The newspaper is mailed to all the members, with a reported circulation of 94,000.

== Ajax Kids Club ==
In addition to Ajax Life membership, the SVA offers a membership for children aged 0–12 through the Ajax Kids Club. A collaboration with the Ajax football club, the Kids Club organizes several events aimed at children, centered around the team mascot Lucky Lynx and the club itself. These include the Ajax Kids Clubblad (kids' magazine), which releases eight issues per year.

== Board and Staff ==
The board of Supportersvereniging Ajax consists of the following members:

- President: Daniël Dekker
- Secretary: Tijn van Hooven
- Treasurer: Patrick van Amelsvoort
- Board member, Supporters Policy: Ine van Brenk
- Board member, General Affairs: Martine Eikelhof

== See also ==
- AFCA Supportersclub
- Ajax Business Associates
