= AFCA Supportersclub =

Supporter's Association

AFCA Supportersclub logo

The AFCA Supportersclub is an independent and official supporters' association linked to AFC Ajax, a football club based in Amsterdam, Netherlands.

The group's administration and financial structure is separate from that of the football club, which allows the group to fully dedicate themselves to the interest of the club's supporters without there being any conflict of interest. The group is particularly dedicated to preserving the Ajax traditions, taking a stand on topics such as the club's appearance, the integration of youth players and has been particularly aggressive in the restoration of the former Ajax logo.

Together with the SVA (Supportersvereniging Ajax), the organization has officially been recognized by Ajax as the club's second supporters group, since their integration into the supporters structure in 2006.

== History ==
Founded on August 31, 1999 as the Onafhankelijke Fanclub Ajax (OFA) the fan club became an official supporters club of AFC Ajax on October 10, 2006, after the group merged with the Ajax Supporters Delegatie (ASD) to form the AFCA Supportersclub after representatives of the group attended a board meeting that same day. The newly formed AFCA Supportersclub would give the club supporters a more solid ground from which to express their views and an organization to discuss matters of interest pertaining to both parties, such as the collective influence surrounding the atmosphere in the stadium during home matches. With a reported 42,000 members, the supporters club holds a degree of influence in matters pertaining to the club and was even able to introduce honorary club member Ronald Pieloor as an official member of the board at AFC Ajax, giving the group a voice to address the supporters needs within the scope of actual team affairs.

OFA logo (1999–2006)

== Supporters Advisory Committee ==
The Supporters Advisory Committee (SAC) (Dutch: Supporters Advies Commissie) is an initiative by Axios, the AFCA Supportersclub and the SVA (Supportersvereniging Ajax). The committee provides advice and support in disputes with the KNVB, if one has been wrongfully banned from a stadium due to past incidents the SAC can also help to provide a neutral standpoint without being affected by the outcome. Many supporters are often overwhelmed by the vast amount of rules and regulations of the ruling committee over football in the Netherlands, and the SAC help to bring clarity to any given situation.

Supporters who have been banned can appeal the ban with the aid of the AFCA according to the KNVB Guidelines for Stadium bans '13/'14, after sufficient support has been provided and the supporter has expressed his remorse regarding previous actions, the SAC will then testify to AFC Ajax who can then decide on whether or not to appeal the ban and enroll the supporter in the KNVB forgiveness program. Supporters with bans exceeding the three-year limit are exempt from the SAC.

== Events ==
The AFCA Supportersclub has been responsible for several fundraisers for various causes, and organizes various events, including indoor/outdoor sporting events, such as the Para Smit Tournament.

AFCA is also largely responsible for organizing the commute to away matches for the various support groups such as F-side and VAK410, as well nationally as for continental away matches, such as for the UEFA Champions League for example.

=== Geef Ajax z'n gezicht terug! ===
Geef Ajax z'n gezicht terug! (English: Give Ajax his face back!) was a widespread campaign which was launched by the organization during the 2013–14 Eredivisie season, requesting to have the face of Ajax returned to the team crest by reverting to the logo which was in use prior to the current one. Posters appeared everywhere in Amsterdam with the catchphrase "Give Ajax his face back", with the campaign even finding its way into prominent Dutch media with significant news coverage, the group were able to collect a vast number of signatures in support of the logo change. in 2025 it was announced that the old logo would be returned to the crest from the 2025/2026 season onwards.

== Ajax Supportershome ==
The AFCA is responsible for the upkeep as well as various events which take place at the official Ajax Supportershome located right outside the Amsterdam Arena. The building is completely covered in graffiti pertaining to the history and imagery of the club, made by various CBS (Can't Be Stopped) members, a famed graffiti crew from Amsterdam associated with the AFCA Supportersclub

At 3:30 AM on Friday morning of January 23, 2015, the Ajax Supportershome was set on fire and burned to the ground, two days ahead of the Klassieker match against arch rivals Feyenoord. The building was completely destroyed, damage which included a large collection of art and memorabilia of the club, from the late honorary member Bobby Haarms and a large collection of shirts of past players were all destroyed in the fire.

A few days later the fire department ruled the fire as a result of arson, with the police releasing a video showing two men entering and then fleeing the burning building. It was the second time the building had been set on fire, after the supporters of ADO Den Haag had previously set fire to it in 2005. In the aftermath of the fire, various former Ajax players such as Klaas-Jan Huntelaar, John Heitinga, Hedwiges Maduro, Wesley Sneijder and Patrick Kluivert donated shirts and memorabilia for the new supporters home, while the RSCA Supportersclub of RSC Anderlecht in Belgium started a fund raiser to help the club, since the supporters of both clubs have kept close ties for many years.

== Honorary members ==
The AFCA Supportersclub currently has two honorary club members.

- (Netherlands) Bobby Haarms
- (Netherlands) Ronald Pieloor

== Board and staff ==
The board consists of the following members:

- Chairman: Seal
- Secretary: Sander
- Treasurer: Antoinette
- Board member Supporters Policy: Bert-Jan
- Board member Legal Affairs: Ric
- Board member General Affairs: Joost

All functions on the board and staff of the organization are completely voluntary and unpaid.

== See also ==
- Ajax Business Associates
- Supportersvereniging Ajax
