= Beverwijk Bazaar =

Coordinates: 52°28′43″N 4°40′1″E

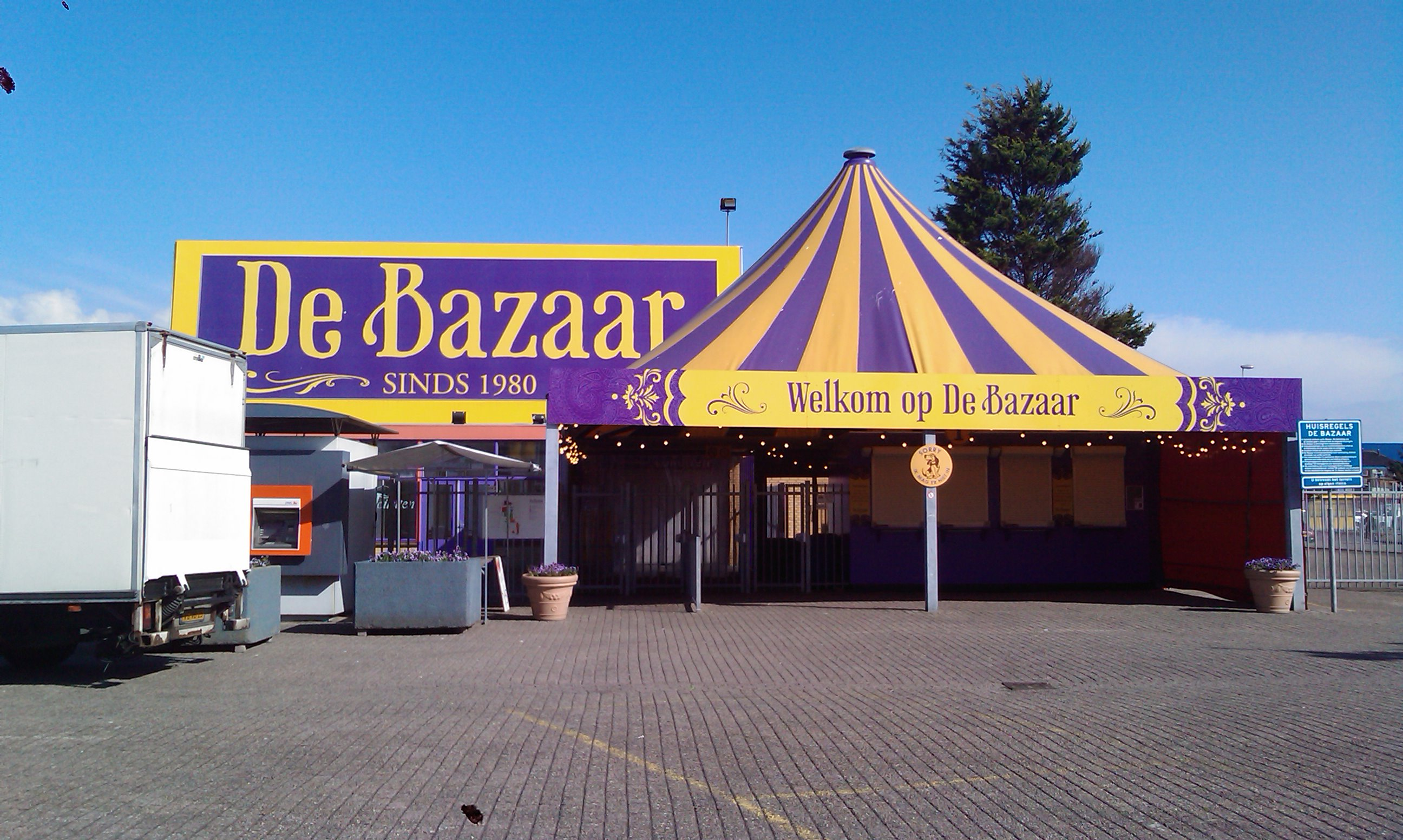
Main entrance to the Bazaar

The Beverwijk Bazaar (Dutch: Beverwijkse Bazaar) is a covered market in Beverwijk, the Netherlands. With over 2000 shops and stalls on 75,000 m^{2}, it claims to be the largest recreational covered market in Europe.

== History ==
On 13 September 1980, Bart van Kampen started the "Black Market": a flea market, housed in the produce and flower auction hall of Beverwijk. With 500 stalls, the first Black Market attracted 14,000 visitors. Initially, the market was open only on Saturdays, but since the addition of the "Turkish Market" in 1982 (renamed to "Oriental Market" in 1984), it is also open on Sundays. In 1986, the "Grand Bazaar" opened, followed by the "Computer Market", "Hall 30" (initially "China Town") in 2007, "Mihrab" in 2014, and the "Gold Souk" in 2015.
