= VAK410 =

Dutch association football fan group

Badge of VAK410, since 2001

The VAK410 (Dutch, "Section 410") was a Dutch Ultras group associated with AFC Ajax. The name comes from the name of their initial stand in Ajax's home stadium, the Amsterdam Arena.

== Background ==
VAK410 was founded on 26 January 2001 by fanatic supporters of the club who were tired of being on the waiting list for the already existing hooligan firm F-side. On that day, young Ajacied Karel organized the first meeting of the group's in the Amstel Cup home match against SBV Vitesse in row 114. The match resulted in a 1–2 loss. However, the club took a positive stance towards the initiative to create more of an atmosphere in the North side of the stadium, and so VAK410 was born.

Originally known as the Ajax Ultras, with ajaxultras.nl being the official website, the group relocated to row 415 on 11 February 2001 ahead of the home match against Willem II, right next to the "Away row" for visiting supporters. Ajax' fanzine De Ajax Ster, otherwise known as DAS, reported on the development of the row, despite the low turnout of the ultras during the match. However, two weeks later, on 25 February 2001, the group celebrated its first big success when a large gathering managed to silence the visiting crowd during the home match against FC Utrecht.

The first match in their current location in the stadium, from which they took the name VAK410, was held on 19 August 2001, at which point the group had approximately 400 members. Considered one of the most famous Tifosi groups in the sport, the group considered itself to be an ultra fan group, and it distanced itself from hooliganism.

The group dissolved in the summer of 2016, after disagreements with Ajax Amsterdam's management, over the decision of the club's board to move them away from their years long location at VAK 410 of the Amsterdam Arena.

== Incidents ==
Since the formation of the group, there have been several incidents that have led to negative press or even to the club being fined. In August 2010, Ajax was fined €10,000 for the group's behavior during a UEFA Europa League away match against Juventus due to severe destruction inside the stadium, the lighting of fireworks, and for injuring an Italian steward in the stadium. Ajax was fined €10,000 once more in 2013 during the UEFA Champions League home match against Manchester City after VAK410 revealed a massive banner showing a crossed out Sheikh holding a bag of money, with the phrase 'Against Modern Football!' under it. UEFA called the banner tasteless and completely unfitting. During the final of the KNVB Cup in 2014, the group sabotaged the match by throwing fireworks onto the pitch in the vicinity of their own goalkeeper. They did this because the final was held in 'De Kuip', the stadium of rival club Feyenoord. The match was stopped twice with Ajax leading 1–0. After resuming the match, Ajax eventually lost 1–5 to PEC Zwolle. The group first stated that throwing fireworks is an inalienable part of such finals. After pressure from authorities and the F-side, the group eventually did apologise for its behaviour in what would get known as the Vuurwerkincident.

== See also ==
- North Up Alliance
- South Crew
- Barra Brava
- Casual (subculture)
- Curva
- Hooliganism
- List of hooligan firms
- Major football rivalries
- Torcida
