= Iron rod incident =

Football hooliganism incident in 1989

The Iron rod incident (Dutch: Staafincident) was an incident of football hooliganism at the De Meer Stadion of Dutch football club Ajax Amsterdam on 27 September 1989. During a home match against Austria Wien, the Austrian goalkeeper Franz Wohlfahrt was struck by an iron rod launched onto the pitch by an Ajax supporter from the F-side hooligan group. As a result, Ajax had to concede the match by default and were excluded from competing in European football for a year.

Earlier that year, Ajax chairman Ton Harmsen had been succeeded by Michael van Praag, the son of Harmsen's predecessor Jaap van Praag. Under the initiative of the new chairman, popular Dutch celebrities would accompany the team on match days as public speakers, in order to promote fair play. After TV personality Frank Masmeijer and singer Harry Slinger had previously accompanied the team on a match, it was Dutch comedian Freek de Jonge's turn during the UEFA Cup match between Ajax and Austria Wien. Ajax had already lost the away match against Austria Wien 1–0 and therefore would need at least a 1–0 victory at home. At the time of the match Austria made the headlines because the country's president at that time, Kurt Waldheim, appeared to have been involved in deportations and actions against partisans during World War II, which he had concealed in his autobiography.

== Phonecall for Waldheim ==
Freek de Jonge started the evening as a host with an innocent joke about Ajax defender Danny Blind. During the second half of the match however he jokingly stated that a telephone call had been received for Mr. Waldheim, who was kindly requested to call back Simon Wiesenthal. After 90 minutes of play Ajax were up 1–0, but during extra time Austria Wien were able to equalize which would ultimately lead to the ejection of Ajax. The hooligan firm F-side of Ajax began to chant: "Nazis! Nazis!", and 17-year-old Ajax-supporter Gerald M. launched an iron rod from the fence onto the pitch, which hit Austria Wien keeper Franz Wohlfahrt in the back, after which the match was halted at a score of 1–1. The next day De Jonge expressed to the press his regret in making his comments, but denied any responsibility for the actions that occurred in the stadium henceforth. According to journalist Nico Scheepmaker, De Jonge had gone too far, following his previous comments on the Hillsborough disaster as well as the 1977 Dutch school hostage crisis.

== Consequences ==
Ajax lost the home match by default with a score line of 3–0 after the actions that took place, and were subsequently banned from competing in European football for two years due to the incident (1990–1992). They challenged the last ruling of UEFA, upon which the punishment was reduced to one year (1990–1991) plus the obligation to play the next three European home matches at least 100 km away from Amsterdam. The appeal committee let the reprehensible behavior of Freek de Jonge weigh in on the decision to lighten the punishment. Ajax settled with the thrower of the iron rod after he had been sentenced in 1996 to pay half a million guilders for damages plus 15 thousand guilders costs. Gerald M. had been arrested a few days after the incident and was sentenced in late 1989 to five months in prison, and two months probation. After serving his sentence, he asked Ajax permission to apply for a yearly subscription, which was granted.

The rod incident, along with the nail bombs incident shortly afterwards, made it clear that the safety at the De Meer Stadion was hopelessly outdated, and it indirectly influenced the club's decision to build the Amsterdam Arena, now known as the Johan Cruyff Arena.
