= S.C.F. Hooligans =

Dutch football hooligan firm

S.C.F. Hooligans (Sport Club Feyenoord) is a Dutch football hooligan firm associated with Feyenoord. The number of supporters in the year 1990 was estimated at around 350 people (often called hooligans). The characteristics are a tattoo on the right forearm, some clothing and a hat. The group consists of a mix of men from different backgrounds, both workers and students and working fathers. There are often two distinct groups: the 'old' hard core (active from the year 1970) and the 'new' hard core (active since 1990 and violent), also known as Feyenoord third generation Rotterdam (FIIIR).

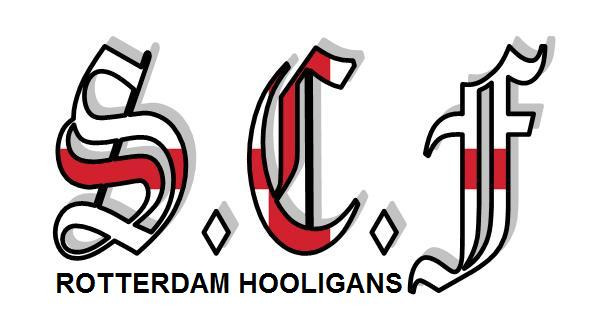
S.C.F. Hooligans emblem

After this there came a third younger group, who frequently used hard drugs. In order to distinguish them, the SCF hooligans sometimes calls themselves 'real S.C.F.' analogy of the Real IRA. Moreover, the distinction between the 'new' hard core and the 'elusive hooligans' are thin: both groups afford football a subordinate role and focus more on riots.

== Violence and composition ==
Violence forms an integral part of the SCF. In clashes with rival hooligans such as F-side of AFC Ajax, there are often carried weapons (such as knives, bats and brass knuckles), but firearms are rejected. Recordings of fights are sometimes made by members to return home to see. There is a silence within the group.

Within the SCF there is clear hierarchy. Newcomers ("errand boys") can be set by the SCF 'scout' or voluntary base, where boys with acquaintances in the SCF often easier to be included. All entrants must prove themselves. Running away from battles means for example that they be put out. If they are part of the SCF, it is often 'for life', as they describe themselves. By showing strength, members can progress to a higher status. The highest status have the 'leaders' or 'controls'. Fastly the S.C.F was seen as one of the most feared hooligan firms in Europe.

== History ==
The first time the group (then often called simply "Vak S", after the fixed position in the stadium) wide in the headlines was during the final of the UEFA Cup in 1974 when Feyenoord hooligans and Tottenham Hotspur went to blows with each other, with 200 wounded. In 1982 there was a bomb thrown by a Feyenoord hooligan during a game against AZ. In 1983 followed a rematch between Feyenoord and Tottenham Hotspur, which was widely condemned by the press, which exclude images from a Feyenoord hooligan with a knife stabbing a hooligan from Tottenham Hotspur. In the 1980s, many acts of vandalism were committed (scrapping trains and buses) were gas stations and shopping (in the city of the party) robbed and many fights were organized, especially with Ajax and the police. The authorities and the police did everything possible to thwart the group, with success: the group disintegrated.

Early 1990s there was a violent new group, according to journalist Paul Gageldonk by UEFA were considered the most violent core of Europe. This group was among others involved in the 'Battle of Beverwijk', where one or more Feyenoord hooligans killed F-side boy Carlo Picornie. Several other people were seriously injured. Because the fight was so heavy the riot police could look on only. According to some it was a miracle that "just" one man was killed. Feyenoord hooligans came armed with bats, chains, bottles, Molotov Cocktails, and tasers, many of which were seized by police after the battle. Earlier, in 1991 it was also a Feyenoord hooligan who killed FC Twente hooligan Erik Lassche, reportedly the first football death by violence. The violent reputation had its appeal to violent types who cared little about football.

== Measures against SCF ==
Police seized hard after the murder and the prosecutor tried unsuccessfully to prosecute Feyenoord hooligans for participating in a criminal organization, the court found the evidence insufficient. However, the leaders of the SCF were often observed by a special unit of the Rotterdam police, who also visited the SCF hooligans at home and warned them that they were followed. During the period from the year 1990 followed also various other measures like camera surveillance, the introduction of the season ticket with pictures and the introduction of stadium bans. Feyenoord is also attempted to prevent youth with problems to go on the hooligan tour, for example by organizing football tournaments for young people in Rijnmond. Because many previous measures are only partly led to results, Feyenoord agreed with Ajax to play away games in the coming years without fans. In March 2009 the Lower House on the football law to prepare for fights that offense. The law gives more powers to mayors nuisance groups area ban for a long time and contact ban to impose, including a notification can be imposed.

== Literature ==
- Paul van Gageldonk (1996), Hand in hand: op stap met de hooligans van Feyenoord. Amsterdam: Nĳgh & Van Ditmar.
- Paul van Gageldonk (1999), Geen woorden maar daden: het drama van Beverwĳk en hoe het verder ging met de hooligans van Feyenoord. Amsterdam: Nĳgh & Van Ditmar.
- E J van der Torre (1999), Voetbal en geweld: onderzoek naar aanleiding van rellen en plunderingen bij een huldiging in Rotterdam. Crisis Onderzoek Team. Alphen aan den Rijn: Samsom.
