= F-side =

Dutch football hooligan group

F-Side
- Logo F-side, founded in 1976
- Named after: Vak-F, De Meer Stadion
- Founding location: Amsterdam
- Years active: 1976–16.10.2026
- Territory: Mainly Amsterdam and surrounding towns
- Membership: at the peak 350(today not exactly known)
- Criminal activities: Football hooliganism; riots; fighting; arson; drug trafficking; murder (by some of their members)
- Allies: Brussel Casual Service; Gate 13; Opravcy Ultras; Maccabi Fanatics
- Rivals: S.C.F. Hooligans; Bunnikside; Midden Noord; Lighttown Madness

The F-side is a Dutch football hooligan group associated with AFC Ajax. The name came from the stand in Ajax's former stadium De Meer Vak F.

== Background ==
The F-side was founded in 1976. The biggest rivalry was between the F-side and Vak S of Feyenoord. The F-side also has many clashes with the North Side of ADO Den Haag and the Bunnikside of FC Utrecht. After the infamous Staafincident ( Iron Bar incident ) in 1989 Ajax took measures. After a very high fence was installed in front of the F-side's traditional seating in Vak F, the F-side decided to move to Vak M, next to the stand for away supporters. Other supporters from other cities in the Netherlands came to use the old F-side stand. The old F-siders came mainly from Amsterdam. On the F-side, there were two groups: the old and the new generation.

=== The Battle of Beverwijk ===
On 23 March 1997 the F-Side boys met with Feyenoord hooligans on a freeway outside Amsterdam in Beverwijk and the violence which followed has come to be known as the Battle of Beverwijk. Feyenoord and Ajax had not played that day. During the battle Carlo(s) Picornie, an F-Side top boy, was killed and several other people were seriously injured. According to some it was a miracle that "just" one man was killed. The fighting only lasted about five minutes. When the police arrived, the fighting had already stopped and no arrests were made. Feyenoord fans came armed with bats, chains, bottles, Molotov cocktails, and tasers, many of which were seized by police after the battle. The death of Picornie is still fresh in the minds of Ajax fans and, to this day, his seat is left unoccupied at the stadium in remembrance of his murder.

=== Amsterdam Arena ===
In 1996 Ajax moved to a new stadium: the Amsterdam Arena. The Ajax board decided to spread the members of the F-side in the stadium. The F-side made an agreement with the Ajax board to give the F-side a stand in the south side of the stadium (old and new generations on the same stand). In 2009 another Ajax hooligan group called (Ultras) VAK410 was moved from the north side of the Arena to the south side above the F-side. VAK410 and the F-side dominate a large area on the south side of the stadium.

Because the hooligan problem in the Netherlands was a big problem, the government decided to make a combi arrangement. The away supporters can only come to the game by train (or by bus) from their city to the other stadium. There is also a chopper above the train the whole rail track. Nearby the other stadium the away supporters go from the (separate) rail station in a tube to the away stand. In spite of this the games AFC Ajax - Feyenoord, Feyenoord - Ajax, Ajax - ADO Den Haag and ADO Den Haag - Ajax are played without away supporters because there is always trouble and there is an enormous police force power needed.

In the last few years, the F-side has become less active. Most of the original members are no longer active as hooligans and because the F-side is nowedays not the only "hardcore group" of Ajax (the hooligans of Ajax also includes members from VAK410 and other groups). The F-side (and the other Ajax groups) use to name A.F.C.A (hooligans) to identify themself as the Ajax hooligans. Nevertheless the influence of the F-side is considered one of the strongest among the Ajax hooligans.

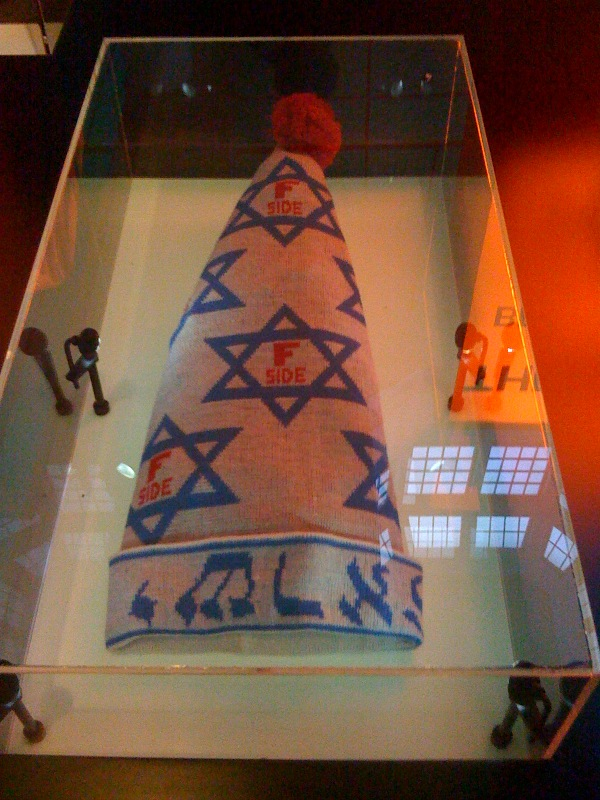
F-Side hat on display at the Jewish Historical Museum in Amsterdam.

== See also ==
- Sven Westendorp
- VAK410
- South Crew
- North Up Alliance
- Barra Brava
- Casual (subculture)
- Curva
- Hooliganism
- List of hooligan firms
- Major football rivalries
- Torcida
- Ultras
