= 1999–2000 Arsenal F.C. season =

English football club season

Arsenal F.C.
1999–2000 season
- Chairman: Peter Hill-Wood
- Manager: Arsène Wenger
- Stadium: Highbury (home domestic and UEFA Cup matches); Wembley Stadium (home UEFA Champions League matches)
- FA Premier League: 2nd
- FA Cup: Fourth round
- League Cup: Fourth round
- FA Charity Shield: Winners
- UEFA Champions League: Group stage
- UEFA Cup: Runners-up
- Top goalscorer: League: Thierry Henry (17); All: Thierry Henry (26)
- Highest home attendance: 73,336 vs Fiorentina (27 October 1999)
- Lowest home attendance: 15,239 vs Preston North End (12 October 1999)
- Average home league attendance: 38,033 (in all competitions)
| Home colours | Away colours |

The 1999–2000 season was Arsenal's eighth season in the FA Premier League and their 74th consecutive season in the top flight of English football. The club ended the campaign second in the league, 18 points behind Manchester United. Arsenal exited both domestic cup competitions on penalties, being eliminated by Leicester City in a FA Cup fourth round replay and by Middlesbrough at the same stage of the Football League Cup. For the second consecutive season Arsenal failed to progress past the group stage of the UEFA Champions League; a third-place finish, however, earned them a consolation place in the UEFA Cup. Arsenal eventually reached the final to play Galatasaray in Copenhagen – the match was overshadowed by altercations between both sets of supporters. Arsenal lost 4–1 on penalties after a goalless draw.

A number of signings were made by Arsenal in the summer transfer window, namely defenders Sylvinho and Oleh Luzhnyi and striker Thierry Henry, who joined from Juventus on a club record fee. Davor Šuker departed Real Madrid to sign for Arsenal, following Nicolas Anelka's move in the opposite direction. Steve Bould left Arsenal to play for Sunderland, while Stephen Hughes signed for Everton in the spring.

Inconsistent performances in the league, particularly away from home, meant Arsenal never posed a serious threat to Manchester United, the reigning champions. Midfielder Patrick Vieira was suspended from playing for much of late autumn after a confrontation with West Ham United player Neil Ruddock. In October, Arsenal notably staged a comeback against Chelsea, with Nwankwo Kanu scoring a hat-trick in the final 15 minutes of the game. A run of eight straight wins between March and May propelled Arsenal from fifth to second and the team finished on 73 points.

== Background ==
Arsenal ended the previous season as runners-up to Manchester United in the FA Premier League. The club made an indifferent start to the campaign as reigning league champions and failed to progress past the group stages of the UEFA Champions League. After defeat to Aston Villa in December 1998, Arsenal embarked on a 19 match unbeaten run (21 in all competitions) to climb up the league table. The run in all competitions ended against Manchester United in a FA Cup semi-final replay. In April, Arsenal moved to the top of the Premier League after beating Middlesbrough 6–1, albeit having played a match more than Manchester United. A 3–1 away win against Tottenham Hotspur put Arsenal three points clear as United drew to Liverpool on the same night. Going into the final two matches of the season, both clubs were on the same points, but Arsenal's defeat to Leeds United all but ended their chances of retaining the title.

At the start of the 1999–2000 season, Arsenal ended its long-standing kit sponsorship with JVC. The club signed a three-year deal with SEGA as replacement, worth £10 million. The SEGA Dreamcast name was carried on the home kit, while SEGA was embroidered on the new yellow away kit.

=== Transfers ===
Frenchman Rémi Garde retired from career football at the end of the 1998–99 season. Kaba Diawara left Arsenal six months after joining to sign for Marseille. Defender Steve Bould moved to Sunderland for an estimated fee of £500,000, which ended his 11-year association with Arsenal. The player felt it was the "right decision" as he wanted first-team football.

In May 1999, Nicolas Anelka stated his desire to leave Arsenal and cited the English media as a reason for wanting to leave the club as they caused him "enormous problems on a personal level". Lazio was interested in signing the player, but the Italian club refused to pay Arsenal's asking price of £23 million. After Real Madrid reopened negotiations with Arsenal and Anelka, a deal was finally reached on 1 August 1999 and the player signed for the club, the next day. Arsenal sought to strengthen the squad's attacking options first by signing Davor Šuker from Real Madrid; the player was prepared to take a pay cut to join the club. The club then signed Juventus forward Thierry Henry for a club record fee of £11 million. Wenger, who served as the player's mentor at Monaco, believed his best position was as a goalscorer: "He was the top scorer in the Under-17s for France when I first had him and I think that, as well as having the qualities of youth, pace and power, he is a good finisher. That is something he has not worked on enough in the last two years because he has played more wide, but I think he can become a central striker again. That is what we will try to develop together."

Other additions to the squad included Sylvinho and Oleh Luzhnyi. Striker Luís Boa Morte moved to Southampton in August 1999, while midfielder Stephen Hughes completed his transfer to Everton in March 2000.

==== In ====
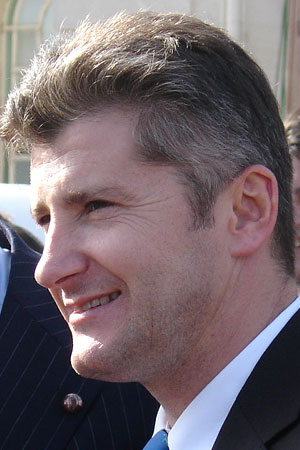
Striker Davor Šuker left Real Madrid and signed for Arsenal in August 1999.

| No. | Position | Player | Transferred from | Fee | Date | Ref |
|---|---|---|---|---|---|---|
| 22 | DF | Oleh Luzhnyi | Dynamo Kyiv | £1,800,000 | 28 May 1999 | |
| 26 | DF | Moritz Volz | Schalke 04 | Undisclosed | 1 June 1999 | |
| 19 | MF | Stefan Malz | 1860 Munich | £650,000 | 24 June 1999 | |
| 16 | DF | Sylvinho | Corinthians | £4,000,000 | 30 June 1999 | |
| 9 | FW | Davor Šuker | Real Madrid | £3,500,000 | 2 August 1999 | |
| 14 | FW | Thierry Henry | Juventus | £11,000,000 | 3 August 1999 | |

==== Out ====
| No. | Position | Player | Transferred to | Fee | Date | Ref |
|---|---|---|---|---|---|---|
| 27 | FW | Kaba Diawara | Marseille | Undisclosed | 1 June 1999 | |
| 26 | FW | Fabián Caballero | Tembetary | Undisclosed | 9 June 1999 | |
| 19 | MF | Rémi Garde | Retired | | 9 June 1999 | |
| 5 | DF | Steve Bould | Sunderland | £500,000 | 2 July 1999 | |
| 29 | DF | Jason Crowe | Portsmouth | Free | 7 July 1999 | |
| 28 | MF | Michael Black | Tranmere Rovers | Free | 8 July 1999 | |
| 9 | FW | Nicolas Anelka | Real Madrid | £23,500,000 | 4 August 1999 | |
| 21 | MF | Luís Boa Morte | Southampton | Undisclosed | 26 August 1999 | |
| 32 | MF | Omer Riza | West Ham United | Undisclosed | 8 December 1999 | |
| 23 | MF | Stephen Hughes | Everton | Undisclosed | 7 March 2000 | |

==== Loan out ====
| No. | Position | Player | Loaned to | Loan commenced | Loan expired | Ref |
|---|---|---|---|---|---|---|
| 23 | MF | Alberto Méndez | SpVgg Unterhaching | 6 October 1999 | End of the season | |
| 31 | GK | Stuart Taylor | Bristol Rovers | 24 September 1999 | October 1999 | |
| 22 | MF | David Grondin | Saint-Étienne | 1 August 1999 | End of the season | |
| 36 | DF | Brian McGovern | Queens Park Rangers | 4 January 2000 | April 2000 | |

== Pre-season and friendlies ==
In preparation for the forthcoming season, Arsenal played a series of friendlies. In England, they travelled away to play Boreham Wood, and Notts County, before travelling to France to play Saint-Étienne and Monaco.

| 9 July 1999 Friendly | Boreham Wood | 1–6 | Arsenal | Borehamwood |
| | | Report | (?) Wreh (?) Lincoln (?) Barrett (?) Pennant | Stadium: Meadow Park; Attendance: 3,892 |

| 17 July 1999 Friendly | Notts County | 1–2 | Arsenal | Nottingham |
| | | Report | (?) Wreh (?) Ljungberg | Stadium: Meadow Lane |

| 24 July 1999 Friendly | Saint-Étienne | 2–2 | Arsenal | Saint-Étienne |
| | | Report | (?) Ljungberg (?) Kanu | Stadium: Stade Geoffroy-Guichard |

| 26 July 1999 Friendly | Monaco | 1–1 | Arsenal | Clermont-Ferrand |
| | | Report | 23' Pignol (o.g.) | Stadium: Stade Gabriel Montpied |

=== Lee Dixon Testimonial ===
The club also staged a testimonial for defender Lee Dixon once the season commenced against Real Madrid.

| 8 November 1999 Lee Dixon testimonial | Arsenal | 3–1 | Real Madrid | London |
| | Vieira 12'; Bergkamp 41'; Malz 71' | Report | 73' Karembeu | Stadium: Highbury; Attendance: 22,486 |

== FA Charity Shield ==
The 1999 edition of the FA Charity Shield was contested between Manchester United and Arsenal. The game took place at Wembley Stadium on 1 August. Manchester United went ahead seven minutes before the end of the first half, but late goals from Kanu and Ray Parlour gave Arsenal victory in the match. Wenger believed the result showed that his team were "ready for the season" and thought it was "...psychologically important to beat United, especially after the great run they have had".

| 1 August 1999 Final | Arsenal | 2–1 | Manchester United | Wembley Stadium, London |
| 15:00 BST | Kanu 67' (pen.); Parlour 78' | | Yorke 36' | Attendance: 70,185; Referee: Graham Barber (Hertfordshire) |

== FA Premier League ==
=== August–October ===
"At a Stamford Bridge saturated by drama, he worked his magic when Arsenal looked dead and buried. Despair turned into delirium for the visiting supporters. With 15 minutes left they trailed 2–0 to a Chelsea team who hadn't conceded at home all season. Arsène Wenger feared for his season and what happened next aged him 10 years, he wheezed afterwards."

— Amy Lawrence's account of Kanu's impact against Chelsea in The Observer, 24 October 1999.

Arsenal began the league season with a home fixture against Leicester City. Henry started the match on the substitutes' bench along with Overmars and Upson, while Šuker was absent as he was unfit. After a quiet first half, Leicester scored the opening goal when Neil Lennon's intervention prompted striker Tony Cottee to "gleefully pounce from inside the six-yard box". Dennis Bergkamp equalised for Arsenal in the 65th minute and with time running out, the home team scored the winner in unexpected circumstances. Defender Frank Sinclair headed the ball into the back of his team's goal net, after Leicester failed to deal with a corner. Three days later, Emmanuel Petit and Bergkamp scored in Arsenal's win against Derby County; the team's performance was described by Wenger as "more resilient than brilliant". Arsenal drew 0–0 with newly promoted Sunderland on 14 August 1999, in a match where Petit and Bergkamp both suffered injuries. A week after the team faced Manchester United at Highbury. It was billed as "the world's first live interactive match", allowing viewers of Sky Digital access to statistics and alternative camera angles. United midfielder Roy Keane scored twice to overturn Arsenal's 41st-minute lead and inflict the home team's first defeat since December 1997. Arsenal recovered three days later to defeat Bradford City by two goals to nil, but lost to Liverpool at Anfield in their final game of August.

September saw Arsenal win all of their league matches. At home to Aston Villa, Šuker scored his first goals for the club and earned the praise of his manager Wenger: "He is just obsessed by goals. You feel when he is inside the box he hits the target." Away to Southampton, it was the other signing Henry who scored his first goal for Arsenal. The player, on as a substitute, received the ball from Tony Adams and with his back to goal "some 20 yards out", turned and curled it past goalkeeper Paul Jones. Henry later admitted his failure to score for Arsenal before then was getting him down: "My goal today was very important for me. I have missed at least 14 or 15 chances for Arsenal and my confidence was low." Kanu scored the only goal of the match against Watford, which moved Arsenal in third position, two points behind leaders Manchester United.

Arsenal faced West Ham United in the first weekend of October. Dixon, Nigel Winterburn and Overmars were rested for the match, replaced by Oleh Luzhnyi, Slyvinho and Davor Šuker. In spite of general dominance from Arsenal, West Ham striker Paolo di Canio scored in each half to win his team the match. Patrick Vieira was dismissed during play for a foul on Di Canio. A confrontation soon after occurred between the player and Neil Ruddock. Vieira was subsequently charged, banned for six matches and fined a record £45,000 by The Football Association. Šuker scored twice against Everton at Highbury on 16 October 1999. Arsenal then travelled to Stamford Bridge to face Chelsea. Goals from Tore André Flo and Dan Petrescu seemed to have given the home side victory, before Kanu scored a hat-trick in the space of 15 minutes. His first involved extending his legs and stabbing the ball past goalkeeper Ed de Goey, once it fell kindly in his direction. The equaliser came in the 83rd minute: Kanu received the ball from Overmars, which took him away from goal but hit the ball to the left of De Goey's dive. In injury time Kanu, in the downpour, chased down the ball and dribbled past the stranded Chelsea goalkeeper on the byline, before curling the ball over Frank Leboeuf and into the far corner of the goal net. Kanu's teammate Šuker described the third goal as "beautiful", while Bergkamp added: "The skills he has got, the moves he makes, are something you like to watch and learn from. I watch him in training and it is a joy." The month ended with a goalless draw at home to Newcastle United, which left Arsenal fourth, three points behind league leaders Leeds United.

=== November–February ===
Arsenal's first fixture of November was the North London derby against Tottenham Hotspur. After 20 minutes, Tottenham were 2–0 up after goals from Steffen Iversen and Tim Sherwood. Vieira scored for Arsenal from a header, but there were no further goals in the game. In the second half Ljungberg was sent off, as was Keown in stoppage time, to reduce Arsenal to nine men. The team responded with a 5–1 win against Middlesbrough, in which Overmars scored three goals. Arsenal then came from behind to beat Derby County on 28 November 1999; they ended the month in third, three points behind Leeds United in first.

Gilles Grimandi, Dixon and Overmars scored a goal apiece in Arsenal's victory at Leicester City in early December. Matthew Upson was forced to come off the pitch before the half-hour mark, after suffering a knee injury. Arsenal only managed a draw against Wimbledon on 18 December 1999; Henry's second half goal cancelled out Wimbledon's opener – a cross by Marcus Gayle met Carl Cort, whose shot hit goalkeeper Alex Manninger's left leg and went in. The poor form over Christmas continued: Arsenal lost 3–2 to Coventry City on Boxing Day. Rob Hughes of The Times noted his concerns about Arsenal's defence, which: "...conceded 17 goals last season but now, at the halfway stage, [...] have already let in 20", but did go on to add "there was nothing lacking in the tenacity of Arsenal." Vieira made his return for the match against league leaders Leeds United, who were eight points in front of Arsenal. Wenger reshuffled the defence, dropping Dixon and Winterburn for Luzhnyi and Sylvinho, while Grimandi replaced Keown who was injured. Ljungberg and Henry scored for Arsenal in their 2–0 win to put the team third at the end of 1999. Adams suggested after the Leeds match that his opponents' inexperience and thin squad would jeopardise their chances of winning the league: "They are still involved in the UEFA Cup and the FA Cup as well. So come February time they will start to feel that pressure – and you don't know what it is like until you have been through it."

On 3 January 2000, Arsenal played Sheffield Wednesday at Hillsborough and were held to a 1–1 draw. Two concerns for Arsenal were Overmars' ankle injury sustained during the match and the absence of Kanu, who left to represent his country in the African Nations Cup. Arsenal recorded a 4–1 win against Sunderland to move level on points with Manchester United in second, though the champions had three games in hand. The first was against Arsenal at Old Trafford on 24 January 2000. Wenger selected five midfielders in his starting team, as injuries limited his forward options. Arsenal began the match the better of the two teams and led 1–0 after 11 minutes, after good play from Ljungberg. United as the game went on looked "fresher", with substitute Teddy Sheringham equalising in the second half.

February saw Arsenal's title challenge take a turn for the worse, with consecutive defeats. The first came at Valley Parade, away to Bradford City. Striker Dean Saunders scored the match winner in the 57th minute, which marked Arsenal's fifth defeat in a dozen away league games. The team then lost to Liverpool at home a week later, who moved into third place. Wenger said it "had been a very bad week" for Arsenal, and noted "qualification for third place [was] not over ... it's still possible if we get our players back in the right shape". The month ended with a 3–1 win against Southampton, in which Bergkamp and Kanu returned to the starting line-up.

=== March–May ===
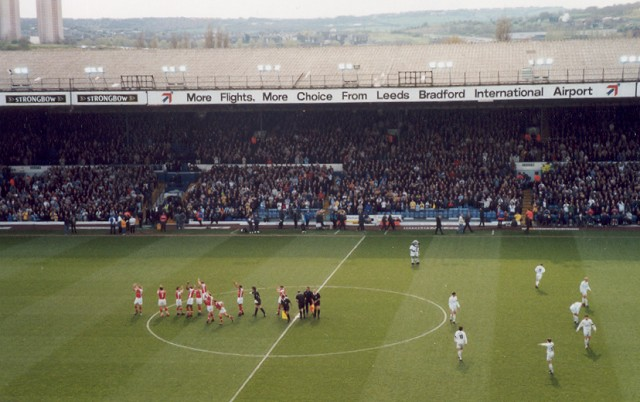
Arsenal and Leeds United players after observing a minute's silence, April 2000.

Dixon's late goal earned Arsenal a point against Aston Villa on 5 March 2000. The team, without Adams, Keown and Overmars, lost to Middlesbrough a week later. Wenger conceded afterwards his team were paying for their participation in the UEFA Cup, as "...the recovery time is too short. We only had two and a half days, which is not enough, especially when you are travelling". Arsenal beat their rivals Tottenham a week later. Henry, Grimandi and Kanu each scored in Arsenal's 3–0 victory against Coventry City. After 30 games, Arsenal were in fourth position, two points behind Liverpool in third and 13 away from leaders Manchester United.

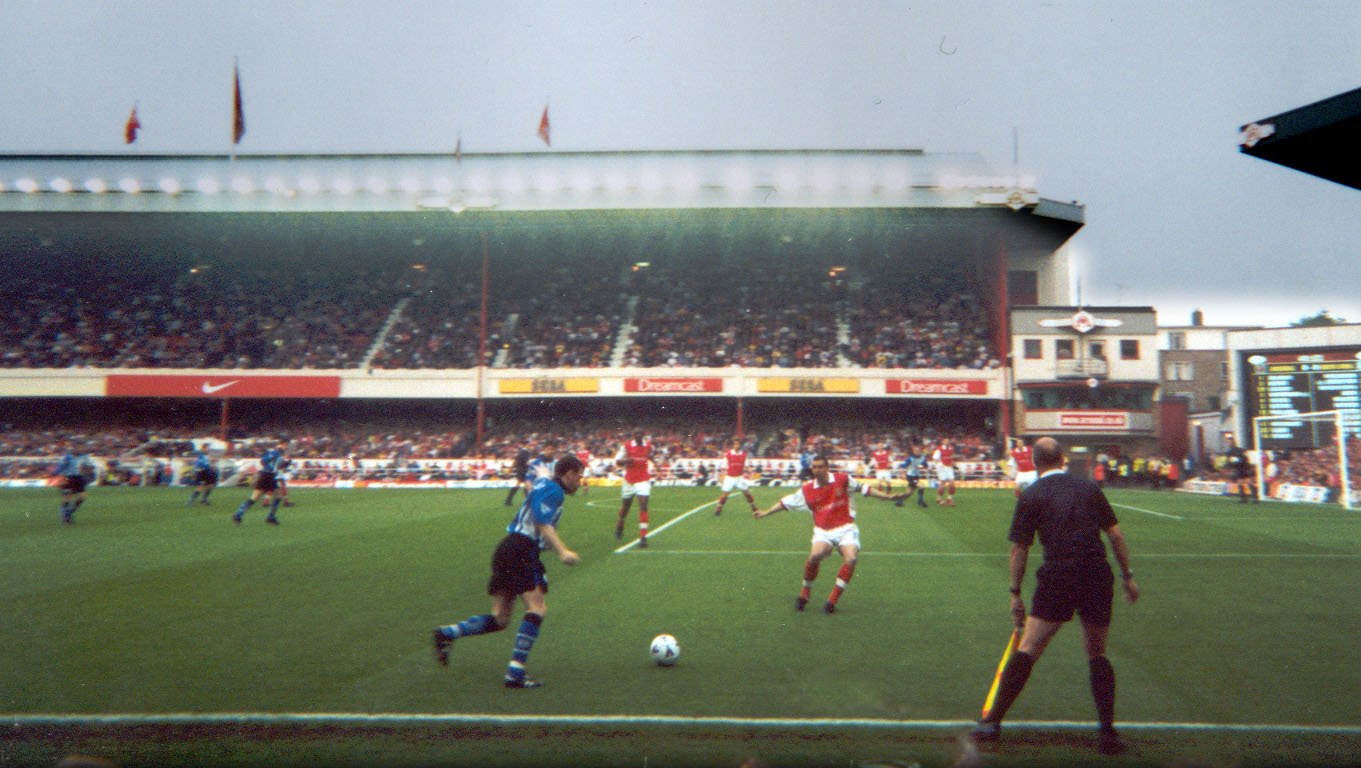
Arsenal and Sheffield Wednesday players in action, May 2000.

In spite of playing the second half against Wimbledon with ten men after the dismissal of Luzhnyi, Arsenal defeated their London rivals by three goals to one. Before the game away to Leeds United on 16 April 2000, both clubs observed a minute's silence to honour the two Leeds fans who were murdered in Istanbul. Wenger and his players then presented bouquets of flowers to their counterparts. Arsenal went ahead in the 21st minute – Henry beat defender Jonathan Woodgate for pace and scored his 20th goal of the season. Further goals by Keown, Kanu and Overmars resulted in a 4–0 win and lifted Arsenal above Leeds into third, with a better goal difference. Arsenal beat Watford and continued their strong finish to the season with a 1–0 win at Everton to move into second place. Wenger believed Manchester United, who retained their status as champions in April, had benefited from the league being "organised" in their favour: "They had a winter break. They didn't play in the FA Cup. It was all wrong from the start. The break was good for them because at the same time we dropped points and so did the other teams. So when they came back they had the psychological advantage."

Petit scored a 90th-minute winner for Arsenal against West Ham United and a further win against Chelsea ensured Arsenal finished second, as Leeds and Liverpool failed to win their respective matches. Arsenal played out a 3–3 draw against Sheffield Wednesday, which relegated their opponents in the process. Arsenal ended their league campaign against Newcastle United at St James' Park. Wenger rested several first-team players to prioritise the 2000 UEFA Cup Final the following week. Arsenal lost 4–2, with Newcastle striker Alan Shearer notably scoring the 300th goal of his career.

=== Match results ===
| 7 August 1999 1 | Arsenal | 2–1 | Leicester City | London |
| 15:00 BST | Bergkamp 65'; Sinclair 90' (o.g.) | Report | 57' Cottee | Stadium: Highbury; Attendance: 38,026; Referee: Alan Wilkie |

| 10 August 1999 2 | Derby County | 1–2 | Arsenal | Derby |
| 20:00 BST | Delap 45' | Report | 40' Petit; 47' Bergkamp | Stadium: Pride Park; Attendance: 25,901; Referee: Stephen Lodge |

| 14 August 1999 3 | Sunderland | 0–0 | Arsenal | Sunderland |
| 15:00 BST | | Report | | Stadium: Stadium of Light; Attendance: 41,680; Referee: Uriah Rennie |

| 22 August 1999 4 | Arsenal | 1–2 | Manchester United | London |
| 16:00 BST | Ljungberg 41' | Report | 58', 88' Keane | Stadium: Highbury; Attendance: 38,147; Referee: Graham Poll |

| 25 August 1999 5 | Arsenal | 2–0 | Bradford City | London |
| 19:45 BST | Vieira 8'; Kanu 17' (pen.) | Report | | Stadium: Highbury; Attendance: 38,073; Referee: Alan Wiley |

| 28 August 1999 6 | Liverpool | 2–0 | Arsenal | Liverpool |
| 15:00 BST | Fowler 8'; Berger 76' | Report | | Stadium: Anfield; Attendance: 44,886; Referee: Dermot Gallagher |

| 11 September 1999 7 | Arsenal | 3–1 | Aston Villa | London |
| 15:00 BST | Šuker 45', 49'; Kanu 82' | Report | 44' Joachim | Stadium: Highbury; Attendance: 38,093; Referee: David Elleray |

| 18 September 1999 8 | Southampton | 0–1 | Arsenal | Southampton |
| 15:00 BST | | Report | 79' Henry | Stadium: The Dell; Attendance: 15,242; Referee: Graham Barber |

| 25 September 1999 9 | Arsenal | 1–0 | Watford | London |
| 15:00 BST | Kanu 86' | Report | | Stadium: Highbury; Attendance: 38,127; Referee: Paul Durkin |

| 3 October 1999 10 | West Ham United | 2–1 | Arsenal | London |
| 16:00 BST | Di Canio 29', 72' | Report | 77' Šuker | Stadium: Boleyn Ground; Attendance: 26,009; Referee: Mike Reed |

| 16 October 1999 11 | Arsenal | 4–1 | Everton | London |
| 15:00 BST | Dixon 40'; Šuker 54', 61'; Kanu 90' | Report | 16' Collins | Stadium: Highbury; Attendance: 38,042; Referee: Steve Dunn |

| 23 October 1999 12 | Chelsea | 2–3 | Arsenal | London |
| 15:00 BST | Flo 38'; Petrescu 52' | Report | 75', 83', 90' Kanu | Stadium: Stamford Bridge; Attendance: 34,958; Referee: Alan Wilkie |

| 30 October 1999 13 | Arsenal | 0–0 | Newcastle United | London |
| 15:00 BST | | Report | | Stadium: Highbury; Attendance: 38,106; Referee: Peter Jones |

| 7 November 1999 14 | Tottenham Hotspur | 2–1 | Arsenal | London |
| 16:00 GMT | Iversen 7'; Sherwood 20' | Report | 38' Vieira | Stadium: White Hart Lane; Attendance: 36,085; Referee: David Elleray |

| 20 November 1999 15 | Arsenal | 5–1 | Middlesbrough | London |
| 15:00 GMT | Overmars 26', 61', 78'; Bergkamp 40', 49' | Report | 68' Ricard | Stadium: Highbury; Attendance: 38,082; Referee: Neale Barry |

| 28 November 1999 16 | Arsenal | 2–1 | Derby County | London |
| 16:00 GMT | Henry 11', 51' | Report | 2' Sturridge | Stadium: Highbury; Attendance: 37,964; Referee: Andy D'Urso |

| 4 December 1999 17 | Leicester City | 0–3 | Arsenal | Leicester |
| 11:30 GMT | | Report | 23' Grimandi; 53' Dixon; 75' Overmars | Stadium: Filbert Street; Attendance: 20,495; Referee: Dermot Gallagher |

| 18 December 1999 18 | Arsenal | 1–1 | Wimbledon | London |
| 15:00 GMT | Henry 61' | Report | 7' Cort | Stadium: Highbury; Attendance: 38,052; Referee: Graham Barber |

| 26 December 1999 19 | Coventry City | 3–2 | Arsenal | Coventry |
| 17:30 GMT | McAllister 6'; Hadji 40'; Keane 71' | Report | 67' Ljungberg; 86' Šuker | Stadium: Highfield Road; Attendance: 22,757; Referee: Rob Harris |

| 28 December 1999 20 | Arsenal | 2–0 | Leeds United | London |
| 15:00 GMT | Ljunberg 32'; Henry 58' | Report | | Stadium: Highbury; Attendance: 38,096; Referee: Graham Poll |

| 3 January 2000 21 | Sheffield Wednesday | 1–1 | Arsenal | Sheffield |
| 15:00 GMT | Sibon 56' | Report | 40' Petit | Stadium: Hillsborough; Attendance: 26,155; Referee: Mike Reed |

| 15 January 2000 22 | Arsenal | 4–1 | Sunderland | London |
| 15:00 GMT | Henry 3', 81'; Šuker 28', 33' | Report | 49' Quinn | Stadium: Highbury; Attendance: 38,039; Referee: Paul Alcock |

| 24 January 2000 23 | Manchester United | 1–1 | Arsenal | Manchester |
| 20:05 ^{1} GMT | Sheringham 73' | Report | 11' Ljungberg | Stadium: Old Trafford; Attendance: 58,293; Referee: Mike Reed |

| 5 February 2000 24 | Bradford City | 2–1 | Arsenal | Bradford |
| 15:00 GMT | Windass 10'; Saunders 57' | Report | 13' Henry | Stadium: Valley Parade; Attendance: 18,276; Referee: Andy D'Urso |

| 13 February 2000 25 | Arsenal | 0–1 | Liverpool | London |
| 16:00 GMT | | Report | 18' Camara | Stadium: Highbury; Attendance: 38,098; Referee: Steve Dunn |

| 26 February 2000 26 | Arsenal | 3–1 | Southampton | London |
| 15:00 GMT | Ljungberg 22', 69'; Bergkamp 36' | Report | 51' Richards | Stadium: Highbury; Attendance: 38,044; Referee: Jeff Winter |

| 5 March 2000 27 | Aston Villa | 1–1 | Arsenal | Birmingham |
| 15:00 GMT | Walker 63' | Report | 84' Dixon | Stadium: Villa Park; Attendance: 36,930; Referee: Graham Poll |

| 12 March 2000 28 | Middlesbrough | 2–1 | Arsenal | Middlesbrough |
| 15:00 GMT | Ince 48'; Ricard 63' | Report | 70' Bergkamp | Stadium: Riverside Stadium; Attendance: 34,244; Referee: Rob Harris |

| 19 March 2000 29 | Arsenal | 2–1 | Tottenham Hotspur | London |
| 15:00 GMT | Armstrong 20' (o.g.); Henry 45' (pen.) | Report | 31' Armstrong | Stadium: Highbury; Attendance: 38,131; Referee: Paul Durkin |

| 26 March 2000 30 | Arsenal | 3–0 | Coventry City | London |
| 16:00 BST | Henry 50'; Grimandi 79'; Kanu 80' | Report | | Stadium: Highbury; Attendance: 38,027; Referee: Barry Knight |

| 1 April 2000 31 | Wimbledon | 1–3 | Arsenal | London |
| 15:00 BST | Lund 12' | Report | 33', 41' Kanu; 89' (pen.) Henry | Stadium: Selhurst Park; Attendance: 25,858; Referee: Uriah Rennie |

| 16 April 2000 32 | Leeds United | 0–4 | Arsenal | Leeds |
| 16:00 BST | | Report | 21' Henry; 70' Keown; 82' Kanu; 90' Overmars | Stadium: Elland Road; Attendance: 39,307; Referee: Steve Dunn |

| 23 April 2000 33 | Watford | 2–3 | Arsenal | Watford |
| 15:00 BST | Helguson 58'; Hyde 60' | Report | 18', 45' Henry; 43' Parlour | Stadium: Vicarage Road; Attendance: 19,670; Referee: Rob Harris |

| 29 April 2000 34 | Everton | 0–1 | Arsenal | Liverpool |
| 15:00 BST | | Report | 34' Overmars | Stadium: Goodison Park; Attendance: 35,919; Referee: Dermot Gallagher |

| 2 May 2000 35 | Arsenal | 2–1 | West Ham United | London |
| 19:45 BST | Overmars 69'; Petit 90' | Report | 40' Di Canio | Stadium: Highbury; Attendance: 38,093; Referee: Paul Durkin |

| 6 May 2000 36 | Arsenal | 2–1 | Chelsea | London |
| 15:00 BST | Henry 21', 48' | Report | 79' Poyet | Stadium: Highbury; Attendance: 38,119; Referee: Mike Reed |

| 9 May 2000 37 | Arsenal | 3–3 | Sheffield Wednesday | London |
| 19:45 BST | Dixon 34'; Sylvinho 78'; Henry 79' | Report | 58' Sibon; 60' De Bilde; 70' Quinn | Stadium: Highbury; Attendance: 37,271; Referee: Jeff Winter |

| 14 May 2000 38 | Newcastle United | 4–2 | Arsenal | Newcastle upon Tyne |
| 16:00 BST | Speed 6', 59'; Shearer 23'; Griffin 63' | Report | 7' Kanu; 53' Malz | Stadium: St James' Park; Attendance: 36,450; Referee: Graham Poll |

- ^{1} Kick-off was scheduled at 20:00, but Mark Bosnich was given time to change his shirt because the colour of it had the same colours as Arsenal's away shirt.

=== Classification ===
| Pos | Team | Pld | W | D | L | GF | GA | GD | Pts | Qualification or relegation |
|---|---|---|---|---|---|---|---|---|---|---|
| 1 | Manchester United (C) | 38 | 28 | 7 | 3 | 97 | 45 | +52 | 91 | Qualification for the Champions League first group stage |
| 2 | Arsenal | 38 | 22 | 7 | 9 | 73 | 43 | +30 | 73 | Qualification for the Champions League first group stage |
| 3 | Leeds United | 38 | 21 | 6 | 11 | 58 | 43 | +15 | 69 | Qualification for the Champions League third qualifying round |
| 4 | Liverpool | 38 | 19 | 10 | 9 | 51 | 30 | +21 | 67 | Qualification for the UEFA Cup first round (Note: Chelsea qualified for the UEFA Cup as FA Cup winners.) |
| 5 | Chelsea | 38 | 18 | 11 | 9 | 53 | 34 | +19 | 65 | Qualification for the UEFA Cup first round |

Source: Premier League
Rules for classification: 1) points; 2) goal difference; 3) number of goals scored.
(C) Champions

==== Results summary ====
| Overall | | | | | | | | Home | | | | | | Away | | | | | |
| Pld | W | D | L | GF | GA | GD | Pts | W | D | L | GF | GA | GD | W | D | L | GF | GA | GD |
|---|---|---|---|---|---|---|---|---|---|---|---|---|---|---|---|---|---|---|---|
| 38 | 22 | 7 | 9 | 73 | 43 | +30 | 73 | 14 | 3 | 2 | 42 | 17 | +25 | 8 | 4 | 7 | 31 | 26 | +5 |

==== Results by round ====
| Round | 1 | 2 | 3 | 4 | 5 | 6 | 7 | 8 | 9 | 10 | 11 | 12 | 13 | 14 | 15 | 16 | 17 | 18 | 19 | 20 | 21 | 22 | 23 | 24 | 25 | 26 | 27 | 28 | 29 | 30 | 31 | 32 | 33 | 34 | 35 | 36 | 37 | 38 |
|---|---|---|---|---|---|---|---|---|---|---|---|---|---|---|---|---|---|---|---|---|---|---|---|---|---|---|---|---|---|---|---|---|---|---|---|---|---|---|
| Ground | H | A | A | H | H | A | H | A | H | A | H | A | H | A | H | H | A | H | A | H | A | H | A | A | H | H | A | A | H | H | A | A | A | A | H | H | H | A |
| Result | W | W | D | L | W | L | W | W | W | L | W | W | D | L | W | W | W | D | L | W | D | W | D | L | L | W | D | L | W | W | W | W | W | W | W | W | D | L |
| Position | 3 | 1 | 2 | 8 | 3 | 6 | 5 | 2 | 3 | 5 | 2 | 3 | 3 | 4 | 3 | 3 | 2 | 4 | 4 | 3 | 3 | 3 | 3 | 3 | 4 | 3 | 4 | 5 | 4 | 4 | 4 | 3 | 3 | 2 | 2 | 2 | 2 | 2 |

A = Away; H = Home; W = Win; D = Draw; L = Loss

== FA Cup ==
Arsenal entered the competition in the third round, by virtue of their Premier League status. Their opening match was a 3–1 win against Second Division Blackpool, where Grimandi, Adams and Overmars got themselves on the scoresheet. In the fourth round, Arsenal faced Leicester City at Highbury. The match ended goalless, meaning a replay was staged at Filbert Street. With neither side able to score in the 90 minutes and extra time, the game was settled on penalties. Leicester goalkeeper Pegguy Arphexad blocked Dixon and Grimandi's spot-kicks to help his side win. Wenger said he was "upset" with the loss, adding "the most important thing is the championship and we have to concentrate on it".

| 13 December 1999 Third round | Arsenal | 3–1 | Blackpool | London |
| 15:00 GMT | Grimandi 24'; Adams 65'; Overmars 90' | Report | Clarkson 39' | Stadium: Highbury; Attendance: 34,143; Referee: Uriah Rennie (Sheffield) |

| 9 January 2000 Fourth round | Arsenal | 0–0 | Leicester City | London |
| 16:00 GMT | | Report | | Stadium: Highbury; Attendance: 35,710; Referee: Mike Riley (West Yorkshire) |

| 19 January 2000 Fourth round replay | Leicester City | 0–0 (a.e.t.) (6–5 p) | Arsenal | Leicester |
| 19:00 GMT | | Report | | Stadium: Filbert Street; Attendance: 15,235; Referee: Mike Riley (West Yorkshire) |
| | Penalties |
| | Gunnlaugsson (penalty scored); Savage (penalty scored); Fenton (penalty scored); Elliott (penalty scored); Oakes (penalty missed); Campbell (penalty scored); Heskey (penalty scored) | | (penalty scored) Šuker; (penalty missed) Dixon; (penalty scored) Hughes; (penalty scored) Parlour; (penalty scored) Henry; (penalty scored) Vieira; (penalty missed) Grimandi |

== Football League Cup ==
Together with the other clubs playing in European competitions, Arsenal entered the Football League Cup in the third round. The team were drawn to face First Division Preston North End, on the week of 11 October 1999. Kanu and Stefan Malz scored a goal apiece to ensure Arsenal progressed into the fourth round, where they played Middlesbrough away. The team exited the competition on penalties, after a score draw.

| 12 October 1999 Third round | Arsenal | 2–1 | Preston North End | London |
| 19:45 | Kanu 31'; Malz 61' | Report | Macken 38' | Stadium: Highbury; Attendance: 15,239; Referee: Terry Heilbron (County Durham) |

| 30 November 1999 Fourth round | Middlesbrough | 2–2 (a.e.t.) (3–1 p) | Arsenal | Middlesbrough |
| 19:45 | Ricard 8', 83' (pen.) | Report | Henry 38'; Šuker 80' | Stadium: Riverside Stadium; Attendance: 23,157; Referee: Mike Riley (West Yorkshire) |
| | Penalties |
| | Ricard (penalty scored); Ziege (penalty scored); Gascoigne (penalty scored) | | (penalty scored) Šuker; (penalty missed) Vivas; (penalty missed) Upson; (penalty missed) Sylvinho |

== UEFA Champions League ==
=== Group stage ===
Finishing second in Premier League the previous season ensured Arsenal's qualification into the UEFA Champions League. For the second season running, Arsenal played their home matches at Wembley Stadium. The club were drawn in Group B, along with Italian club Fiorentina, Barcelona of Spain and Sweden's AIK. In the opening match against Fiorentina, Arsenal dominated possession and created the better chances of the game, but earned no more than a point after Kanu's late penalty miss. The team defeated AIK at Wembley a week after and drew with Barcelona at the Camp Nou. In the reverse fixture, Barcelona defeated Arsenal 4–2 and Wenger rued afterwards: "The defence did not have a good day. They were exposed and didn't get any protection." Arsenal progressed no further in competition after the team were beaten by Fiorentina; Gabriel Batistuta scored the only goal of the match. Overmars scored twice in Arsenal's final group game away to AIK.

| Pos | Team | Pld | W | D | L | GF | GA | GD | Pts | Qualification |
|---|---|---|---|---|---|---|---|---|---|---|
| 1 | (Spain) Barcelona | 6 | 4 | 2 | 0 | 19 | 9 | +10 | 14 | Advance to second group stage |
| 2 | (Italy) Fiorentina | 6 | 2 | 3 | 1 | 9 | 7 | +2 | 9 | Advance to second group stage |
| 3 | (England) Arsenal | 6 | 2 | 2 | 2 | 9 | 9 | 0 | 8 | Transfer to UEFA Cup |
| 4 | (Sweden) AIK | 6 | 0 | 1 | 5 | 4 | 16 | −12 | 1 | |

Source: UEFA

| 14 September 1999 1 | Fiorentina | 0–0 | Arsenal | Florence, Italy |
| 20:45 CET | | Report | | Stadium: Stadio Artemio Franchi; Attendance: 33,903; Referee: Hellmut Krug (Germany) |

| 22 September 1999 2 | Arsenal | 3–1 | AIK | London, England |
| 20:45 | Ljungberg 28'; Henry 90+1'; Šuker 90+3' | Report | Nordin 53' | Stadium: Wembley Stadium; Attendance: 71,227; Referee: Vítor Melo Pereira (Portugal) |

| 29 September 1999 3 | Barcelona | 1–1 | Arsenal | Barcelona, Spain |
| 20:45 | Luis Enrique 16' | Report | Kanu 81' | Stadium: Camp Nou; Attendance: 87,574; Referee: Markus Merk (Germany) |

| 19 October 1999 4 | Arsenal | 2–4 | Barcelona | London, England |
| 20:45 | Bergkamp 44'; Overmars 85' | Report | Rivaldo 15' (pen.); Luis Enrique 16'; Figo 56'; Cocu 70' | Stadium: Wembley Stadium; Attendance: 73,091; Referee: Urs Meier (Switzerland) |

| 27 October 1999 5 | Arsenal | 0–1 | Fiorentina | London, England |
| 20:45 | | Report | Batistuta 75' | Stadium: Wembley Stadium; Attendance: 73,336; Referee: Ľuboš Micheľ (Slovakia) |

| 2 November 1999 6 | AIK | 2–3 | Arsenal | Solna, Sweden |
| 20:45 | A. Andersson 41', 68' | Report | Overmars 17', 52'; Šuker 56' | Stadium: Råsunda Stadium; Attendance: 33,005; Referee: Hartmut Strampe (Germany) |

== UEFA Cup ==
As Arsenal finished third in their Champions League group, they entered the UEFA Cup. Wenger said he intended to take the competition seriously given the team's poor UEFA coefficient. Arsenal played their home games at Highbury instead of Wembley.

=== Knockout stages ===
Third round

Arsenal faced French club Nantes and won the first leg 3–0; Winterburn scored the pick of the three – "a rare but brilliantly struck goal". The team drew the second leg 3–3, though it was enough to see them progress on aggregate score.

| 25 November 1999 First leg | Arsenal | 3–0 | Nantes | London |
| 20:00 | Overmars 13' (pen.); Winterburn 81'; Bergkamp 90' | Report | | Stadium: Highbury; Attendance: 36,618; Referee: Dani Koren (Israel) |

| 9 December 1999 Second leg | Nantes | 3–3 (3–6 agg.) | Arsenal | Nantes |
| 20:45 | Sibierski 12', 57'; Vahirua 77' | Report | Grimandi 25'; Henry 31'; Overmars 42' | Stadium: Stade de la Beaujoire; Attendance: 17,000; Referee: Jan Wegereef (Netherlands) |

Fourth round

At home to Deportivo La Coruña, Arsenal opened the scoring in the fifth minute through Dixon and further goals from Henry, Kanu and Bergkamp ensured it was the club's first victory over Spanish opposition in Europe. Although the team were defeated in the second leg, Arsenal won 6–3 on aggregate.

| 2 March 2000 First leg | Arsenal | 5–1 | Deportivo La Coruña | London |
| 20:00 | Dixon 5'; Henry 30', 67'; Kanu 78'; Bergkamp 83' | Report | Djalminha 55' | Stadium: Highbury; Attendance: 37,837; Referee: Atanas Uzunov (Bulgaria) |

| 9 March 2000 Second leg | Deportivo La Coruña | 2–1 (3–6 agg.) | Arsenal | A Coruña |
| 21:00 | Víctor 68'; Pérez 90' | Report | Henry 63' | Stadium: Estadio Riazor; Attendance: 25,000; Referee: Oğuz Sarvan (Turkey) |

Quarter-finals

Against Werder Bremen, Arsenal won the first leg 2–0 with goals from Henry and Ljungberg. Parlour scored a hat-trick in the return leg – the first of his career.

| 16 March 2000 First leg | Arsenal | 2–0 | Werder Bremen | London |
| 20:00 | Henry 21'; Ljungberg 77' | Report | | Stadium: Highbury; Attendance: 38,009; Referee: Claude Colombo (France) |

| 23 March 2000 Second leg | Werder Bremen | 2–4 (2–6 agg.) | Arsenal | Bremen |
| 20:30 | Bode 41'; Bogdanović 60' | Report | Parlour 8', 25', 70'; Henry 59' | Stadium: Weserstadion; Attendance: 33,000; Referee: Kim Milton Nielsen (Denmark) |

Semi-finals

Arsenal faced French club Lens in the final four and won the first leg by a solitary goal, scored by Bergkamp in the second minute. Victory in the second leg ensured passage to the final. Wenger commented afterwards: "People say we should not have come into this competition, but we have not got the final the easy way – we have played 14 games to get this far."

| 6 April 2000 First leg | Arsenal | 1–0 | Lens | London |
| 20:00 | Bergkamp 2' | Report | | Stadium: Highbury; Attendance: 38,102; Referee: Günter Benkö (Austria) |

| 20 April 2000 Second leg | Lens | 1–2 (1–3 agg.) | Arsenal | Lens |
| 20:45 | Nouma 73' | Report | Henry 41'; Kanu 87' | Stadium: Stade Félix-Bollaert; Attendance: 41,043; Referee: José García-Aranda (Spain) |

=== Final ===
In the lead up to the final against Galatasaray in Copenhagen, scuffles took place between British and Turkish supporters at City Hall Square after an Arsenal fan was stabbed. The incident, dubbed the "Battle of Copenhagen" by the media led to 19 civilians injured and 60 arrests. The match itself was a lacklustre affair; neither side scored after 90 minutes and in extra time Gheorghe Hagi was sent off. It was decided on penalties and Arsenal lost after Šuker and Patrick Vieira missed their spot-kicks. Wenger was disappointed with the manner of the defeat and criticised Spanish referee Antonio López Nieto for not tossing a coin to decide where the shoot-out would take place like UEFA promised him.

| 17 May 2000 Final | Galatasaray | 0–0 (a.e.t.) (4–1 p) | Arsenal | Copenhagen |
| 20:45 | | Report | | Stadium: Parken Stadium; Attendance: 38,919; Referee: Antonio López Nieto (Spain) |
| | Penalties |
| | Penbe (penalty scored); Şükür (penalty scored); Davala (penalty scored); Popescu (penalty scored) | | (penalty missed) Šuker; (penalty scored) Parlour; (penalty missed) Vieira |

== Player statistics ==
Arsenal used a total of 32 players during the 1999–2000 season and there were 15 different goalscorers. There were also six squad members who did not make a first-team appearance in the campaign. Kanu featured in 50 matches whereas Vieira started the most games for Arsenal – 47 in total.

The team scored a total of 106 goals in all competitions. The highest goalscorer was Henry, with 26 goals, followed by Kanu who scored 17 goals. Six Arsenal players were sent off during the season: Vieira, Keown, Henry, Grimandi (twice), Ljungberg and Luzhnyi.

Key

No. = Squad number

Pos = Playing position

Nat. = Nationality

Apps = Appearances

GK = Goalkeeper

DF = Defender

MF = Midfielder

FW = Forward

= Yellow cards

= Red cards

Numbers in parentheses denote appearances as substitute. Players with number struck through and marked † left the club during the playing season.

| No. | Pos. | Nat. | Name | FA Premier League | | FA Cup | | League Cup | | FA Charity Shield | | Europe | | Total | | Discipline | |
| No. | Pos. | Nat. | Name | Apps | Goals | Apps | Goals | Apps | Goals | Apps | Goals | Apps | Goals | Apps | Goals | A yellow rectangular card | A red rectangular card |
|---|---|---|---|---|---|---|---|---|---|---|---|---|---|---|---|---|---|
| 1 | GK | ENG | David Seaman | 24 | 0 | 2 | 0 | 1 | 0 | 0 | 0 | 9 | 0 | 36 | 0 | 0 | 0 |
| 2 | DF | ENG | Lee Dixon | 28 | 3 | 3 | 0 | 0 | 0 | 1 | 0 | 13 | 1 | 45 | 4 | 8 | 0 |
| 3 | DF | ENG | Nigel Winterburn | 19 (9) | 0 | 0 | 0 | 1 | 0 | 1 | 0 | 9 (1) | 1 | 30 (10) | 1 | 3 | 0 |
| 4 | MF | FRA | Patrick Vieira | 30 (1) | 2 | 2 | 0 | 0 | 0 | 1 | 0 | 14 | 0 | 47 (1) | 2 | 14 | 1 |
| 5 | DF | ENG | Martin Keown | 27 | 1 | 2 | 0 | 0 | 0 | 1 | 0 | 9 | 0 | 39 | 1 | 13 | 1 |
| 6 | DF | ENG | Tony Adams | 21 | 0 | 1 | 1 | 0 | 0 | 0 | 0 | 11 | 0 | 33 | 1 | 5 | 0 |
| ~~7~~ | DF | ARG | Nelson Vivas † | (4) | 0 | 0 | 0 | 1 | 0 | 0 | 0 | 1 (3) | 0 | 2 (7) | 0 | 3 | 0 |
| 8 | MF | SWE | Freddie Ljungberg | 22 (4) | 6 | 2 | 0 | 0 | 0 | 1 | 0 | 11 (3) | 2 | 36 (7) | 8 | 5 | 1 |
| 9 | FW | CRO | Davor Šuker | 8 (14) | 8 | 3 | 0 | 1 | 1 | 0 | 0 | 3 (10) | 2 | 15 (24) | 11 | 8 | 0 |
| 10 | FW | NED | Dennis Bergkamp | 23 (5) | 6 | 0 | 0 | 0 | 0 | 0 | 0 | 11 | 4 | 34 (5) | 10 | 8 | 0 |
| 11 | MF | NED | Marc Overmars | 22 (9) | 7 | 1 | 1 | (1) | 0 | 0 | 0 | 11 (3) | 5 | 33 (13) | 13 | 2 | 0 |
| ~~12~~ | FW | LBR | Christopher Wreh † | 0 | 0 | 0 | 0 | (1) | 0 | 0 | 0 | 0 | 0 | (1) | 0 | 0 | 0 |
| 13 | GK | AUT | Alex Manninger | 14 (1) | 0 | 1 | 0 | 1 | 0 | 1 | 0 | 6 | 0 | 23 (1) | 0 | 1 | 0 |
| 14 | FW | FRA | Thierry Henry | 26 (5) | 17 | 3 | 0 | 2 | 1 | 0 | 0 | 7 (5) | 8 | 38 (10) | 26 | 7 | 1 |
| 15 | MF | ENG | Ray Parlour | 29 (1) | 1 | 1 | 0 | 2 | 0 | 1 | 1 | 9 (2) | 3 | 42 (3) | 5 | 5 | 0 |
| 16 | DF | BRA | Sylvinho | 23 (8) | 1 | 3 | 0 | 2 | 0 | 1 | 0 | 7 (2) | 0 | 36 (10) | 1 | 6 | 0 |
| 17 | MF | FRA | Emmanuel Petit | 24 (2) | 3 | 3 | 0 | 0 | 0 | 1 | 0 | 9 (1) | 0 | 37 (3) | 3 | 8 | 0 |
| 18 | DF | FRA | Gilles Grimandi | 27 (1) | 2 | 3 | 1 | 1 | 0 | 1 | 0 | 9 (1) | 1 | 41 (2) | 0 | 11 | 2 |
| 19 | MF | GER | Stefan Malz | 2 (3) | 1 | 2 | 0 | 2 | 1 | 0 | 0 | (2) | 0 | 6 (5) | 2 | 0 | 0 |
| 20 | DF | ENG | Matthew Upson | 5 (3) | 0 | 0 | 0 | 2 | 0 | 0 | 0 | 1 (1) | 0 | 9 (3) | 0 | 1 | 0 |
| ~~21~~ | MF | POR | Luís Boa Morte † | (2) | 0 | 0 | 0 | 0 | 0 | (1) | 0 | 0 | 0 | (3) | 0 | 0 | 0 |
| 22 | DF | UKR | Oleh Luzhnyi | 16 (5) | 0 | 1 | 0 | 2 | 0 | (1) | 0 | 6 | 0 | 24 (7) | 0 | 2 | 1 |
| ~~23~~ | MF | ENG | Stephen Hughes † | 1 (1) | 0 | (2) | 0 | 0 | 0 | 0 | 0 | (1) | 0 | 1 (4) | 0 | 0 | 0 |
| 25 | FW | NGR | Nwankwo Kanu | 24 (7) | 12 | (2) | 0 | 1 | 1 | 1 | 1 | 10 (5) | 3 | 36 (14) | 17 | 3 | 0 |
| 29 | MF | ENG | Jermaine Pennant | 0 | 0 | 0 | 0 | (1) | 0 | 0 | 0 | 0 | 0 | (1) | 0 | 0 | 0 |
| 30 | MF | ENG | Paolo Vernazza | 1 (1) | 0 | 2 | 0 | 0 | 0 | 0 | 0 | (1) | 0 | 3 (2) | 0 | 0 | 0 |
| 32 | DF | WAL | Rhys Weston | 1 | 0 | 0 | (1) | 0 | 0 | 0 | 0 | 0 | 0 | 1 (1) | 0 | 0 | 0 |
| 33 | MF | ENG | Tommy Black | (1) | 0 | 1 | 0 | 0 | 0 | 0 | 0 | 0 | 0 | 1 (1) | 0 | 0 | 0 |
| 34 | DF | ENG | Ashley Cole | 1 | 0 | 0 | (1) | 0 | 0 | 0 | 0 | 0 | 0 | 1 (1) | 0 | 0 | 0 |
| 35 | FW | IRE | Graham Barrett | (2) | 0 | 0 | 0 | 0 | 0 | 0 | 0 | 0 | 0 | (2) | 0 | 0 | 0 |
| 36 | DF | IRE | Brian McGovern | (1) | 0 | 0 | 0 | 0 | 0 | 0 | 0 | 0 | 0 | (1) | 0 | 0 | 0 |
| 38 | MF | ENG | Julian Gray | (1) | 0 | 0 | 0 | 0 | 0 | 0 | 0 | 0 | 0 | (1) | 0 | 0 | 0 |

== See also ==
- 1999–2000 in English football
- List of Arsenal F.C. seasons
