= 2000 UEFA Cup semi-final violence =

Fights between English and Turkish football fans

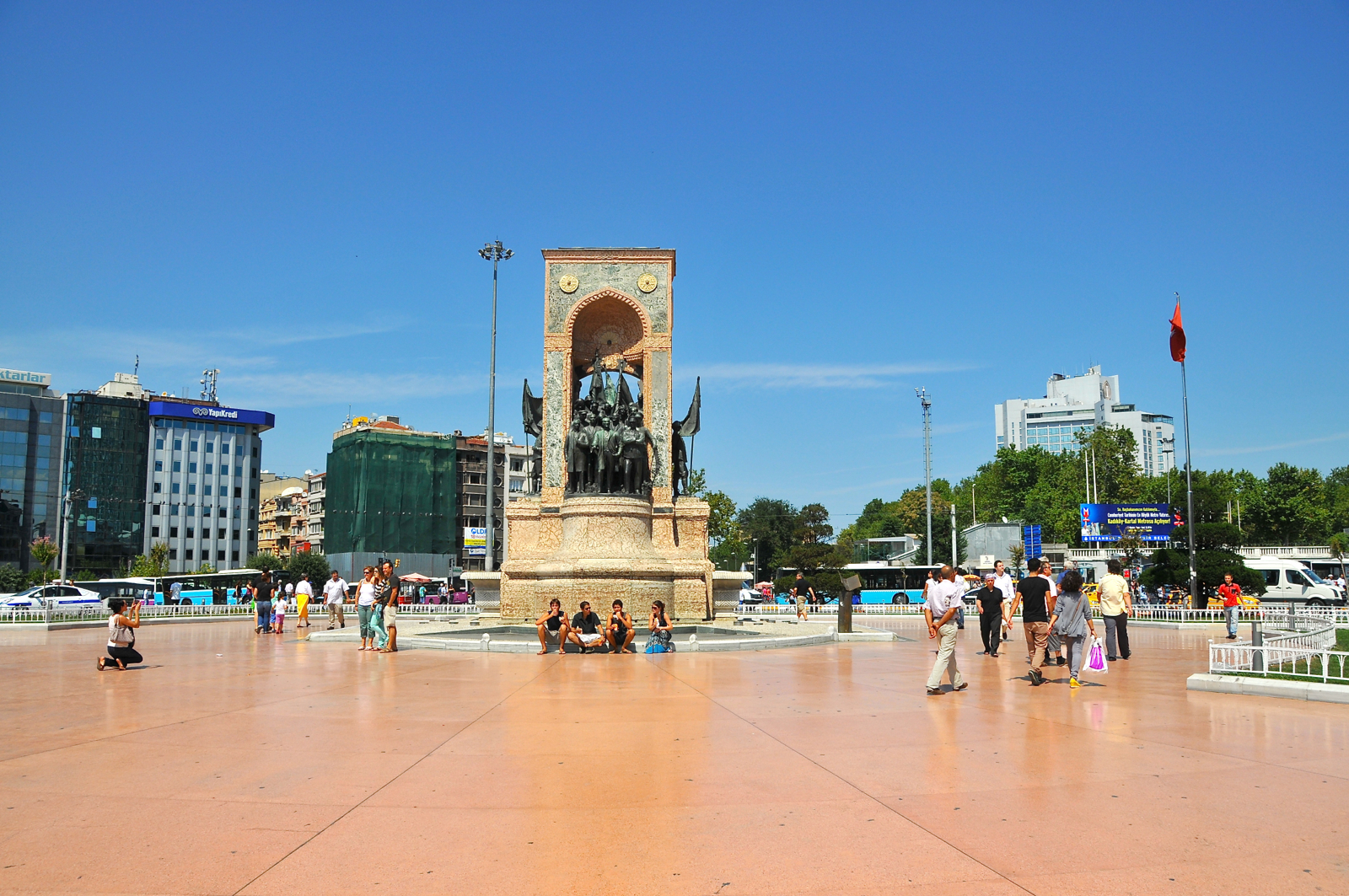
Istanbul's Taksim Square

The 2000 UEFA Cup semi-final violence in Istanbul, Turkey, between fans of English football team Leeds United and Turkish team Galatasaray on 5 April 2000, the day before the first match of their UEFA Cup semi-final, led to two Leeds fans being stabbed to death by Galatasaray fans. Four men were arrested and charged with their murders. The deaths led to widespread outrage in England with Galatasaray fans being banned from attending the second leg in England.

== Background ==
Leeds qualified for the UEFA Cup through finishing fourth in the 1998–99 Premier League. They reached the semi-final after defeating Partizan, Lokomotiv Moscow, Spartak Moscow, Roma and Slavia Prague. Galatasaray qualified for the UEFA Cup by finishing third in the group stage in the 1999–2000 UEFA Champions League. They entered the third round defeating Bologna, Borussia Dortmund and Mallorca en route to the semi-final. Galatasaray had a reputation of creating a hostile atmosphere surrounding their home matches and Leeds travelled there aiming to reach the UEFA Cup Final in order to win in their last chance of silverware of their season.

== Events ==
The violence occurred at 21:00 in Istanbul's Taksim Square during a fight between Leeds fans and Galatasaray fans the day before their UEFA Cup semi-final first leg at Galatasaray's Ali Sami Yen Stadium in Istanbul on 6 April 2000.

Turkish accounts of the events stated that Leeds fans had been taunting people from local bars, which led to the Turkish police being called in to stop fights from breaking out. There were reports that a Galatasaray fan had run to a nearby telephone box to call for support when he saw Leeds fans arriving. Several Galatasaray fans, reportedly members of a gang called "The Night Watchmen", entered the area shortly afterwards, precipitating a fight between the two sets of supporters which led to the two Leeds fans, Kevin Speight, 40, and Christopher Loftus, 37, being stabbed to death. Police arrested Ali Umit Demir and three other men for the stabbings.

The first moments of the fight are unclear with witness accounts of the brawl either being started by Leeds fans throwing beer glasses at Galatasaray fans and insulting the Turkish flag or being started by Galatasaray fans throwing chairs or ambushing Leeds fans with knives. Leeds supporter Steve Wilkinson, who suffered knife wounds to his leg and hand, said of the incident "This was a premeditated attack. We came out of a bar and there were 100 people waiting for us with machetes, knives, bits of chair and table legs and they just attacked us. The police did nothing, in fact they were helping them beat us up."

== Aftermath ==
In 2002, after an adjournment from 2001 where some of the defendants failed to appear in court, Demir was found guilty of murder and was sentenced to 15 years imprisonment which was reduced from 30 years as it was not clear who was the sole cause of the deaths. This sentence was negatively received by residents of Istanbul who said that Demir was a "patriot". In 2005, he was released for a retrial after a change in Turkish law and after an appeal in 2003 was successful. Eventually in 2007, Demir received a sentence of six years and eight months while three other men—Suleyman Gokhan Guven, Suleyman Aydin, Ali Baydar—were also convicted of murder and sentenced to 10 years, six years, and five years respectively. Another man, Suleyman Aydin, was found guilty of affray and jailed for six months and 20 days. In 2010 Guven was recaptured by Turkish police after exhausting his appeals and made to serve four years in prison.

Because of the stabbings, Leeds United banned Galatasaray fans from attending the second leg at Elland Road, claiming that the safety of fans inside the stadium could not be guaranteed and asked for Galatasaray fans not to travel to England. Galatasaray in response asked for the match to be played at a neutral venue or for Leeds fans to be banned from the match as well. In the end, Galatasaray fans were banned from the match. UEFA supported the ban and only 80 tickets were issued to Galatasaray for officials and representatives of the Turkish government. This led to an angry reaction from Galatasaray's vice-president who called the decision "disgusting" and by the Turkish State Minister who said that Leeds were trying to turn the murders into an advantage. Leeds United chairman, Peter Ridsdale, responded by claiming that Galatasaray were showing a lack of respect and said that Galatasaray should withdraw from the UEFA Cup if they did not accept the ban.

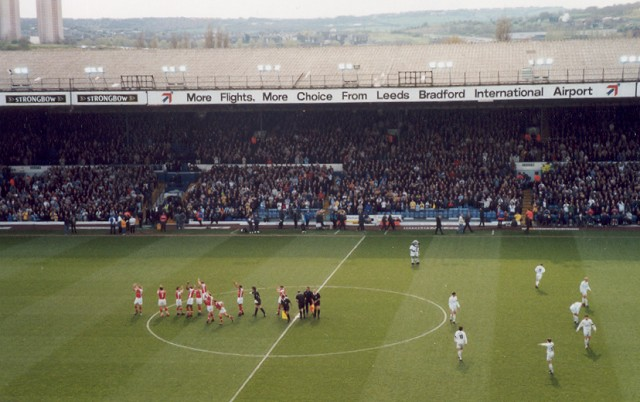
Leeds vs Arsenal before the second leg

The day after the violence; flowers, scarves and shirts were laid outside the Elland Road gates in tribute. The statue of former Leeds United captain Billy Bremner which was outside the stadium also had a black armband placed on it as a symbol of the club mourning. Leeds United installed a brass plaque in Elland Road to remember those who had been killed in the violence. Leeds' Premier League match against Arsenal the Sunday before the second leg was marked by Arsenal players laying flowers at all four corners of Elland Road and a minute's silence being held before the match started in respect for the death of the two Leeds fans.

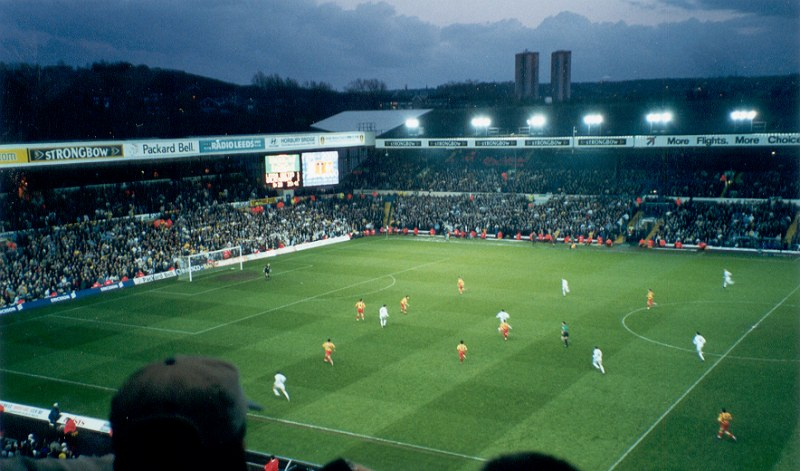
Leeds playing Galatasaray in the second leg

Before the second leg, Ridsdale took out advertisements in British newspapers calling for calm, with the messages in the adverts also being translated into Turkish. Despite this, West Yorkshire Police warned local Turkish businesses to close early. When Galatasaray officials arrived at Elland Road for the second leg, hundreds of Leeds fans attacked the coaches that were carrying them which delayed the kick-off of the second leg. During the first minute of the match, Leeds fans turned their backs on the match in protest at what was viewed as a lack of justice.

Leeds lost the tie 4–2 on aggregate. On the day of the final in Copenhagen, Denmark, members of Leeds United's hooligan firm the Leeds United Service Crew, joined members of other British hooligan firms led by Arsenal's firm. In Copenhagen, they met up in order to enact revenge attacks on Galatasaray fans in City Hall Square.

The next season, Leeds United were drawn against Turkish side Beşiktaş in the Champions League. Security surrounding both matches was increased and planned several months in advance. Because of the tensions caused by the stabbings in Istanbul, only 70 Beşiktaş fans travelled to Leeds. They had originally been booked onto an official Beşiktaş chartered flight; however, it was cancelled, as was pre-match hospitality prepared by Leeds' directors. The flight, sponsored by Beşiktaş fans, was cancelled because only 70 out of a hoped-for 500 fans wanted to go to the match. In the return leg, Beşiktaş placed Leeds fans, who had been escorted through the airport, on an alcohol-free cruise around the Bosphorus Strait before being transported by bus to the BJK İnönü Stadium in Istanbul before the match.

The events are used by some football supporters to antagonize Leeds fans. It has been used by Sheffield Wednesday, Millwall and Manchester United fans. Manchester United fans also brought banners to Leeds matches referencing the murders in Istanbul. In 2009, a Millwall supporter was banned from the New Den for life after taunting Leeds fans about the events whilst wearing a Galatasaray shirt. In 2011, four more Millwall fans were banned from attending the club's matches for waving Turkish flags at a match against Leeds. Galatasaray fans used similar chants before their UEFA Champions League match in 2012 against Manchester United.

In 2015, Galatasaray player Wesley Sneijder apologised after he advertised a set of knives bearing his image on the eve of the 15th anniversary.

In May 2025, a photo of Leeds captain Ethan Ampadu's son wearing a Galatasaray kit began circulating on social media to mass condemnation from Leeds supporters. Leeds soon put out a statement absolving Ampadu of involvement, stating that the photo had been taken by Ampadu's ex-partner who he had separated from several months earlier, declaring Ampadu "has no responsibility for the image in question" and "is aware of and sensitive to the tragic loss within the Loftus and Speight families".

In January 2026, in a Champions League league phase match between Manchester City and Galatasaray, City striker Erling Haaland appeared to perform the Leeds salute after scoring, with speculation fueled by Haaland's father Alf-Inge having played for Leeds United between 1997-2000, during which Erling was born.
