= Brian McGovern (footballer) =

Irish footballer

Personal information
- Date of birth: 28 April 1980 (age 46)
- Place of birth: Dublin, Ireland
- Position: Defender

Youth career
- Cherry Orchard

Senior career*
Years	Team	Apps	(Gls)
1997–2000	Arsenal	1	(0)
1999–2000	→ Queens Park Rangers (loan)	5	(0)
2000–2002	Norwich City	21	(1)
2002–2003	Peterborough United	1	(0)
2003	St Patrick's Athletic	0	(0)
2003–2004	Longford Town	41	(2)
2005	Shamrock Rovers	4	(0)
2005–2006	Bray Wanderers	34	(1)
Total		107	(4)
- * Club domestic league appearances and goals

Brian McGovern (born 28 April 1980) is an Irish former footballer who played as a defender.

== Club career ==
McGovern was born in Dublin. A former Irish U18 and U21 player, he joined Arsenal as a trainee in summer 1997. He made a single appearance for Arsenal against Newcastle United on 14 May 2000, in which a youthful Arsenal side lost 4–2. While with the Gunners, McGovern also had a short loan spell with QPR. Norwich City manager Bryan Hamilton signed McGovern for a fee of £50,000 in August 2000.

McGovern was unable to establish himself in the first team at Carrow Road, scoring once against Tranmere Rovers, and was released in October 2002. He joined Peterborough United but after failing to establish himself there also, and returned to Ireland when a move to Inverness Caledonian Thistle fell through. Briefly with St Patrick's Athletic before going to Longford Town, where again a move to Calley fell through in autumn 2004.

He was signed by the seasiders from Shamrock Rovers, who had signed him on loan from Longford Town, where he had failed to command a place.

McGovern departed from Bray Wanderers in December 2006, having made a total of 40 appearances.

== Sources ==
- Mark Davage; John Eastwood; Kevin Platt (2001). Canary Citizens. Jarrold Publishing. ISBN 0-7117-2020-7.
