= 2000 UEFA Cup final riots =

Football riots in Copenhagen, Denmark

- Date: 17 May 2000
- Location: City Hall Square, Copenhagen, Denmark; 55°40′33″N 12°34′9″E
- Caused by: Retaliation attacks for murders of Leeds United fans by Galatasaray fans in Istanbul, and football hooliganism.
- Methods: Riot
- Result: 19 civilians injured, 60 arrests

Parties
British hooligan firms: The Herd and The Gooners; Leeds United Service Crew; Chelsea Headhunters; Rangers fans; Cardiff City fans; Swansea City fans	Galatasaray fans	Danish police

Lead figures
		Mogens Lauridsen

Number
500+ (approximately)		2,000

The 2000 UEFA Cup final Riots, also known as the Battle of Copenhagen, were a series of riots in City Hall Square, Copenhagen, Denmark between fans of English football team Arsenal and Turkish team Galatasaray around the 2000 UEFA Cup final on 17 May 2000. Four people were stabbed in the scuffles, which also involved fans from other clubs and were viewed by the media as part of a retaliation for the killing of two Leeds United fans by Galatasaray supporters the month before.

The events of the day started early in the morning when skirmishes broke out in a bar, which led to an Arsenal fan being stabbed. Later in the day, Galatasaray fans occupied City Hall Square before heading towards Arsenal fans in bars nearby. The Galatasaray fans were later attacked from behind by members of British hooligan firms seeking revenge for the Istanbul stabbings. The police had prior warning of potential trouble and deployed 2,000 officers to the area, yet they were unable to control the riot until they fired tear gas. This led to 19 injuries, including 4 stabbings, and 60 arrests with similar events occurring in England and Turkey in the aftermath of the riots.

Football authorities condemned the riots and threatened to expel national football teams from European competition if such events happened again. The Danish police were also criticized for their mishandling of the riots.

== History ==
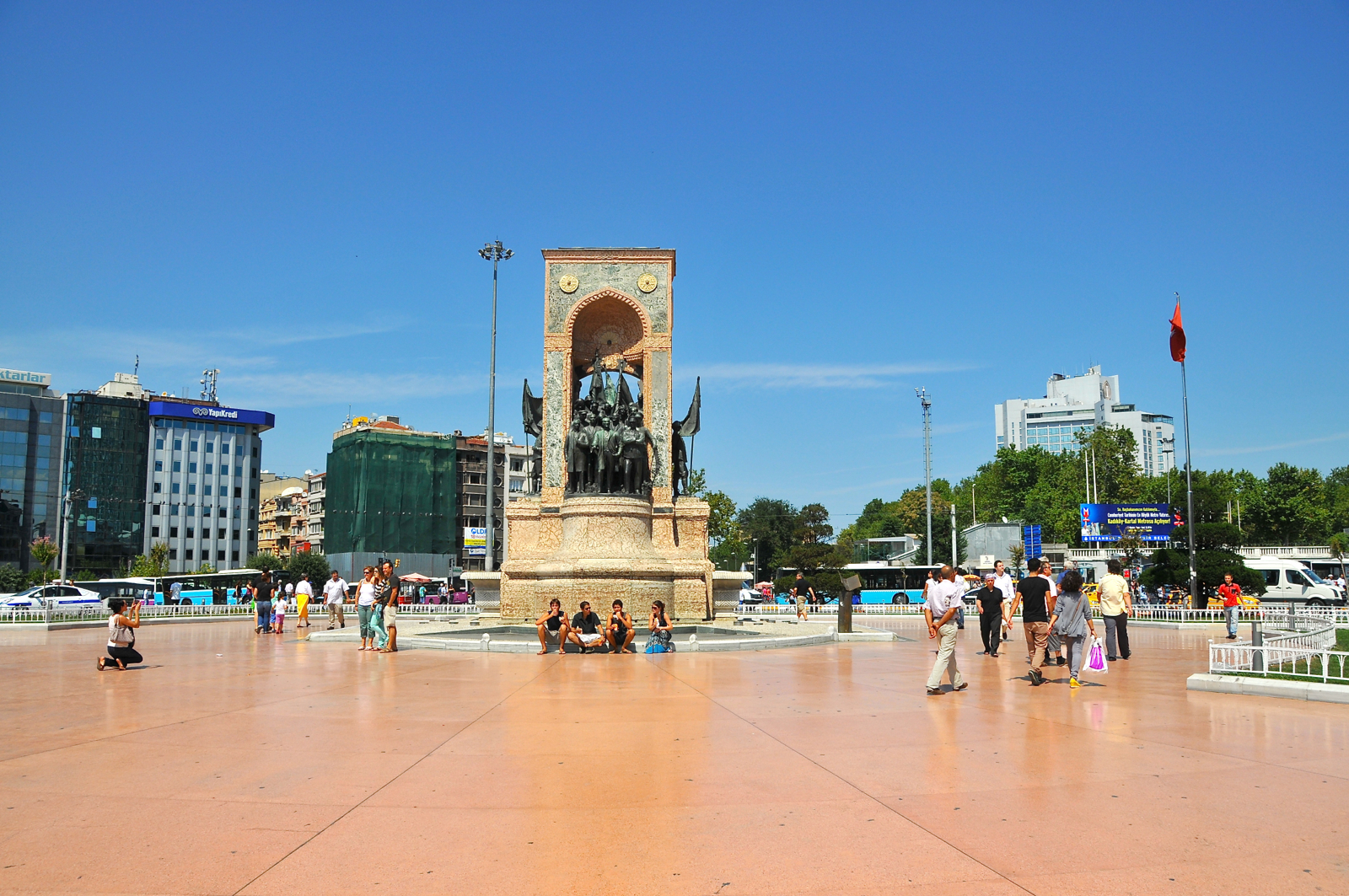
Istanbul's Taksim Square was the scene of rioting in the previous round of the 1999–2000 UEFA Cup.

Arsenal qualified for the final by defeating French club Lens in their semi-final. Galatasaray beat English team Leeds United but their matches were marred by violence: two Leeds United fans were stabbed to death before their semi-final first leg at Galatasaray's Ali Sami Yen Stadium in Istanbul on 6 April 2000. The events happened at 22:00 in Istanbul's Taksim Square during a fight between Leeds fans and Galatasaray fans. Leeds fans had been drinking in bars reportedly taunting local people and Turkish police intervened to stop fights breaking out. There were reports that a Galatasaray fan had run to a telephone to call for support when he saw Leeds fans arriving. Galatasaray fans entered the area shortly afterwards which precipitated a fight between the two sets of supporters. This led to the two Leeds fans being stabbed.

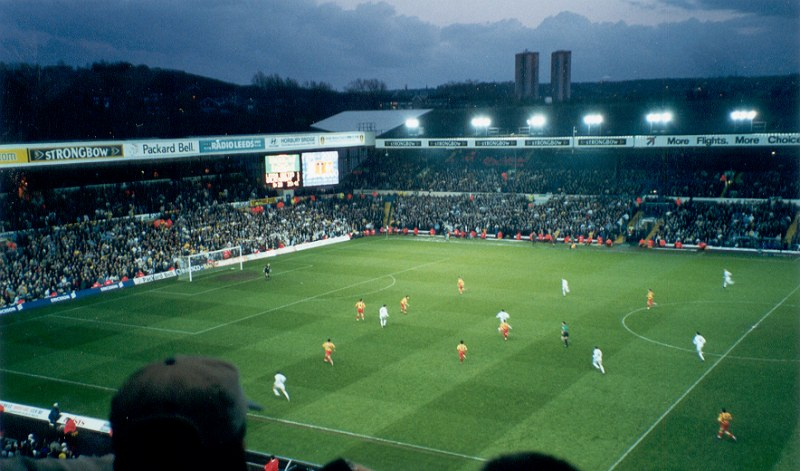
Galatasaray playing Leeds United during the second leg semi-final match at Elland Road. Only 80 away fans were allowed to attend.

It was not clear how the fight started, with reports of it either being started by Leeds fans throwing beer glasses and insulting the Turkish flag, or being started by Galatasaray fans throwing chairs. Police arrested Ali Umit Demir and three other men for the stabbings. Demir was later found guilty of murder and was sentenced to 15 years imprisonment, but released in 2004. As a result of the stabbings, Leeds United banned Galatasaray fans from attending the second leg at Elland Road, claiming that the safety of fans could not be guaranteed. The ban was supported by UEFA and only 80 tickets were issued to Galatasaray for officials and representatives of the Turkish government.

The stabbings caused anger throughout the United Kingdom, and subsequently members of Arsenal's hooligan firms The Herd and The Gooners, wanted to avenge the deaths of the Leeds fans, and telephoned other British hooligan firms, inviting them to join them in Copenhagen to attack Galatasaray fans. It was reported that members of Leeds United's Leeds United Service Crew and Chelsea's Chelsea Headhunters, along with hooligans supporting Rangers, Cardiff City and Swansea City all travelled to Denmark to join Arsenal fans in attacks on Galatasaray fans. This led to the final being considered "high risk"; 2,000 members of the Danish police were assigned to the game, with assistance from members of British and Turkish police forces.

== Events ==
=== In Copenhagen ===
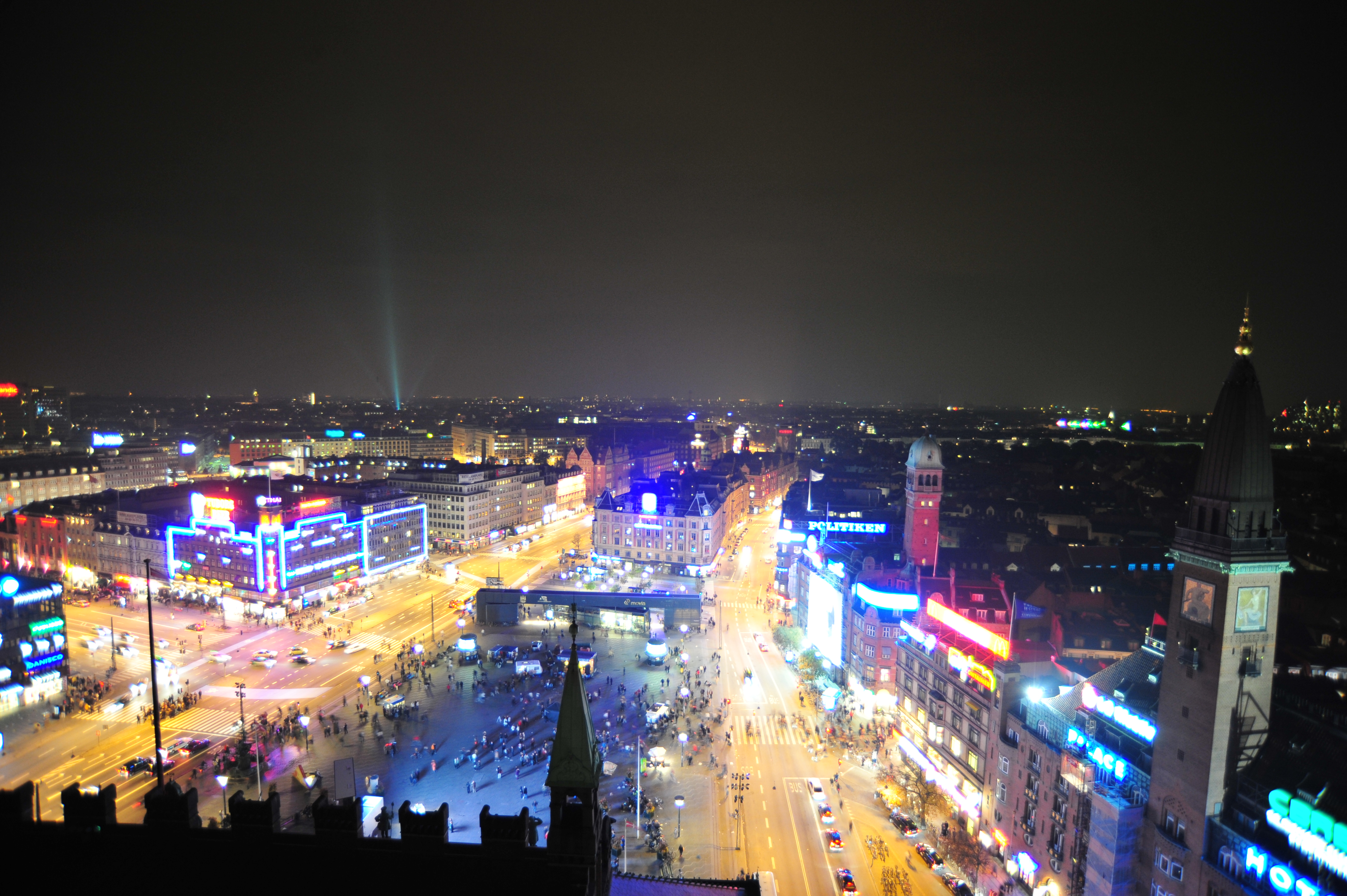
Copenhagen's City Hall Square was the site of the riot.

On the Wednesday at 1:00, Galatasaray fans attacked a bar in Strøget in Copenhagen, where some Arsenal fans were located. The Arsenal fans left the bar to confront the Galatasaray fans, which led to a fight lasting for an hour before riot police managed to control it and arrested four Britons and four Turks. In the fight, Paul Dineen, an Arsenal fan, was stabbed, leading to Arsenal offering fans refunds if they did not want to fly to the game. Dineen was released from hospital later in the day and attended the match as a guest of the Arsenal directors.

Throughout the day large numbers of fans, both English and Turkish, were seen throughout the city and at the airport. Later, large numbers of Galatasaray fans congregated in Copenhagen's City Hall Square, raising the Turkish flag in the square. Arsenal fans congregated in nearby bars. Galatasaray fans attempted to provoke the Arsenal fans in the bars, and the two sides began chanting at each other until bottles were thrown from both sides around 16:00. The Danish police then moved in to separate the fans, and moved the Galatasaray fans back towards the square.

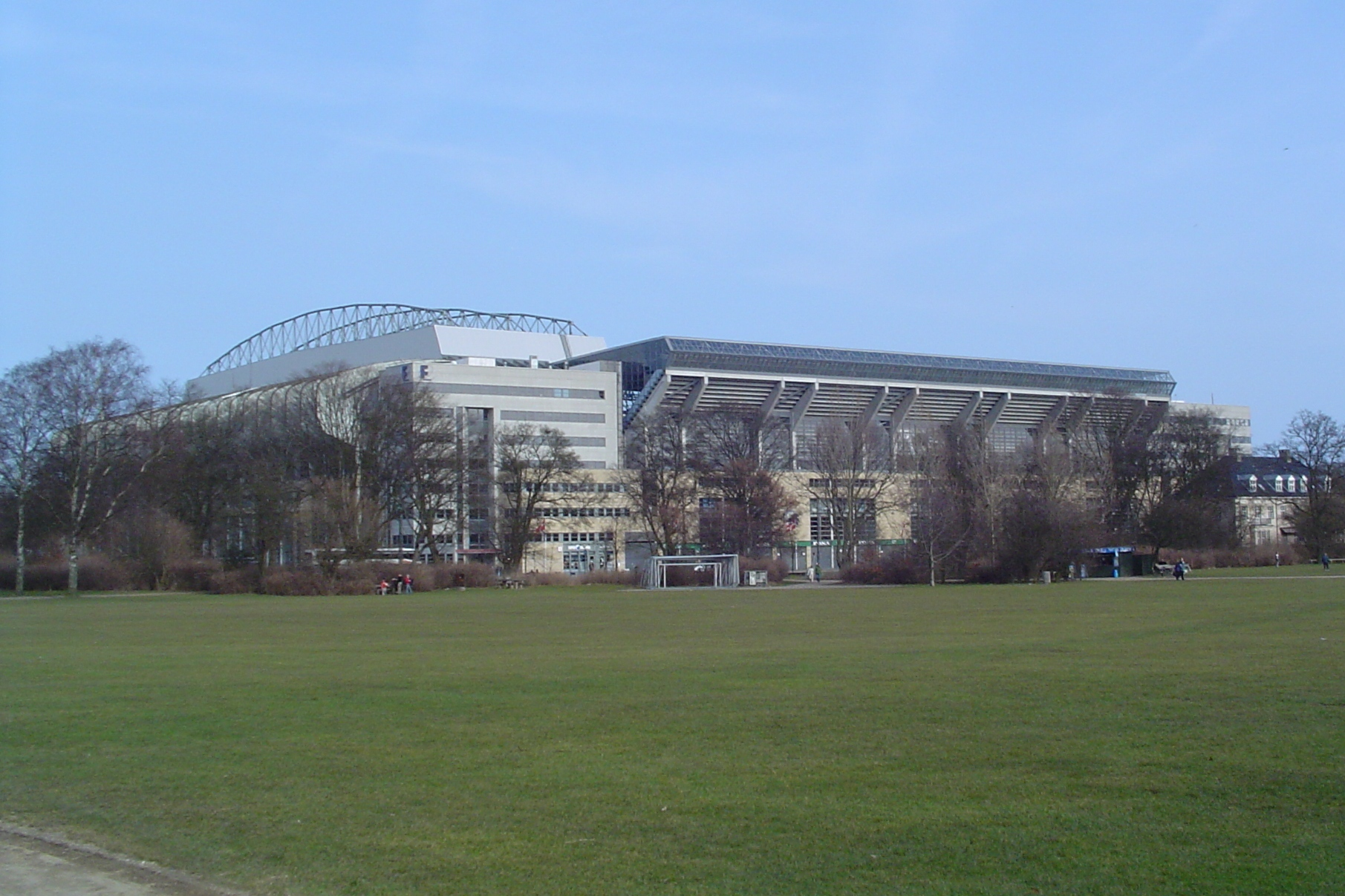
Fences were installed for the Final, held at Parken Stadium.

Then, in a calculated attack, approximately 500 Arsenal fans attacked from the main road behind the Galatasaray fans. This caused a severe riot in the city square, with several restaurant facilities used by fans to fight each other, with iron bars and knives also being used. This lasted 20 minutes before the Danish police attempted to break up the melee with dogs and tear gas. The violence, which included fans from other English clubs and Turks living in Denmark, lasted for 45 minutes. There were further clashes at the airport the day after the game.

At Parken Stadium, where the final was to be played, the police erected iron fencing outside to separate the Arsenal and Galatasaray fans as a precaution. UEFA also requested that fences be put up around the perimeter of the pitch. The riots did not spread to the stadium, although there was an attempt to pull down the fences by fans heading towards the Arsenal area of the stadium before police stopped them.

=== In England and Turkey ===
After the match, which Galatasaray won 4–1 on penalties, approximately 300 Arsenal fans in the Finsbury Park area of Islington in London attacked Turkish restaurants and businesses, with bottles being used to break windows. They then broke into an apartment building to threaten Kosovan refugees with a knife, mistakenly believing them to be Turkish. Six people were arrested and three Metropolitan Police officers were injured. In Turkey, nine people were accidentally shot and injured by Galatasaray fans firing guns in celebration despite police warning them not to.

== Injuries and arrests ==
In all, four people were stabbed during the riots: two English, one Turkish and one Dutch fan. A Danish police officer and a Turkish cameraman were also injured in the riots. In total, nineteen people were injured and sixty people were arrested, with 15 of the arrested being subsequently banned from attending Euro 2000. Nineteen of the arrested were British, thirty-six were Turkish and the rest of the arrested included people from Sweden, Germany and the Netherlands. The British fans were later released without charge but were forbidden from returning to Denmark. The rest were fined an equivalent of $500 and banned from Denmark for a year.

== Aftermath ==
The day after the riots, FA Executive Director David Davies, issued an apology for the violence. Lennart Johansson, the president of UEFA, made a public statement in which he stated that English fans "cannot be allowed to behave like this again and create havoc. The UK government owes it to everyone concerned to take similar steps to those taken in other countries to stop those troublesome fans from travelling abroad." Johannson also warned the British government that if there was any more rioting, the England national football team could face expulsion from Euro 2000. In response, British Prime Minister Tony Blair stated:

Hopefully this threat will bring to their senses anyone tempted to continue the mindless thuggery that had brought such shame to the country.

Turkish Prime Minister Bülent Ecevit also made a call for fans to avoid violence after the riots, stating:

Sports should be an initiative for friendship, not for fighting.

In August 2000, Arsenal banned thirty-seven people involved in the Copenhagen riot from Arsenal's Highbury stadium. Leeds United also banned three of their fans from Elland Road after they had been identified in pictures of the riots.

In the United Kingdom, Arsenal fans were originally blamed for the violence as the police had fixed blame on them. In Turkey, the media portrayed Galatasaray fans as acting in self-defence, with criticism directed at the British fans for allegedly attacking members of the press. However, there were conflicting reports, with claims that some Galatasaray fans were instigating some of the violence. Later on, British media blame also transferred towards Galatasaray fans.

The Danish police were also criticised for their handling of the riots. Their policing of City Hall Square in the days running up to the final was described as "non-existent" by Dineen. It was noted by Turkish newspaper Radikal that cannabis was being freely traded in the city square during the time before the riots, and the police did nothing about it. Arsenal fans also criticised the police, claiming that they had been slow to intervene and were "too soft" on the hooligans. It was claimed that the police failed to control the riots, and that they had been undermanned and outmaneuvered, to which Mogens Lauridsen, the police chief in Copenhagen admitted that the police had been "under-prepared". This came after Arsenal had warned the police before the final that there could be hooligans travelling to Copenhagen.

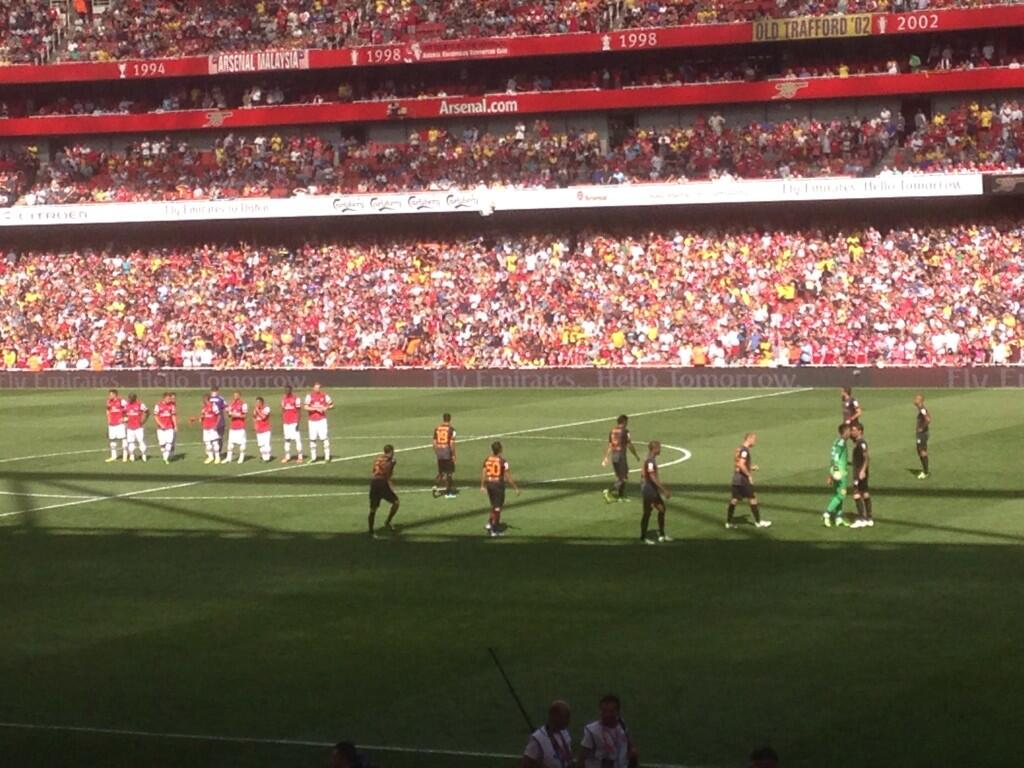
Arsenal invited Galatasaray to play in the Emirates Cup of 2013.

In the United Kingdom, the Daily Mirror newspaper printed pictures of Arsenal fans alleged to have been part of the violence. It later arose that the majority of the people in the photos were either not involved or had been acting in self-defence. The photos led to some postmen working for Royal Mail losing their jobs because they had been seen in the photos and in television coverage, even though they had not been arrested. Michael Doherty, the chairman of the Communication Workers Union, and his brother Tom took Royal Mail to an Employment Tribunal for unfair dismissal claiming they had been acting in self-defence. In 2001, the tribunal ruled in their favour, and ordered Royal Mail to reinstate them. In 2012 Piers Morgan, the editor of the Daily Mirror at the time and a high-profile Arsenal fan who attended the match, apologised for printing the pictures.

In 2013, Arsenal invited Galatasaray to compete at their annual Emirates Cup tournament. Some Arsenal fans reacted negatively to the news, claiming that there was still bad blood between the two sets of supporters and were concerned that there would be a resumption of hostilities between them.

== See also ==
- Arsenal F.C. in European football
- Galatasaray S.K. in European football
