= Arsenal firm =

Groups of football hooligans

The Herd
- Founding location: Holloway, London
- Years active: 1978-present
- Territory: Islington Holloway, London Camden Town
- Ethnicity: White British, White Irish, Greek Cypriots, Asian and Black British
- Membership (est.): 500-950
- Leader: Mad Dog Millar (Top Boy)
- Criminal activities: Football hooliganism, riots and fighting
- Allies: The Gooners , The Champions of England

The Arsenal firms are groups of football hooligans who are fans of the Arsenal Football Club. There are two Arsenal firms, The Gooners (a mutation of the club's nickname, The Gunners) and The Herd. The Gooners were a violent football hooligan firm mainly active in the 1980s and 1990s. However, the name is now used by most non-hooligan Arsenal supporters.

The Herd was mainly active between the late 1970s and early 1990s, it still exists. The Herd are a hooligan gang. The main rivals of The Herd in the 1980s and in the present day are West Ham's I.C.F., Tottenham Hotspur's Yid Army, Chelsea's Headhunters and Millwall's F-Troop (later known as the Millwall Bushwackers). Although The Herd was mainly considered to be a hooligan gang, a few members were not physically violent. Dainton Connell (aka Dainton "The Bear" Cornnell) was considered a folk hero by many Arsenal fans, but died in a car crash in 2007, with 3,000 mourners attending his funeral including several ex players. During the 1980s, Connell was highly active in an Arsenal FC's hooligan "firm" and was a "main face" amongst the ranks. At the same time, he was influential in ensuring that the BNP, and other far-right white-supremacist – then trying to infiltrate football firms – failed to gain any foothold at Arsenal.

The Herd's most notorious clashes were with West Ham at Upton Park in 1983, Millwall fans at Highbury in 1988, PSG's ultras Boulogne Boys in Paris in 1994 before the Cup Winners Cup semi-final and with Galatasaray fans in City Hall Square, Copenhagen in 2000.
