= Stefan Malz =

German former professional footballer (born 1972)

Personal information
- Date of birth: 15 June 1972 (age 54)
- Place of birth: Ludwigshafen, West Germany
- Height: 1.82 m (6 ft 0 in)
- Position: Midfielder

Senior career*
Years	Team	Apps	(Gls)
1992–1993	Darmstadt 98	16	(1)
1993–1997	VfR Mannheim	93	(20)
1997–1999	1860 Munich	36	(2)
1999–2001	Arsenal	6	(1)
2001–2005	1. FC Kaiserslautern	33	(1)
2005–2006	Arminia Ludwigshafen	?	(?)
2006–2008	FSV Oggersheim	36	(5)
Total		220	(30)
- * Club domestic league appearances and goals

Stefan Malz (born 15 June 1972) is a German former professional footballer who played as a midfielder.

Malz is most well known for his two-year spell at Arsenal but was never considered a first team regular; he made just eight appearances in all competitions, scoring two goals. He scored on his debut against Preston North End in the League Cup on 12 October 1999, with his second goal coming in a defeat at Newcastle United on the final day of the 1999–2000 season. He was also an unused substitute in the 2000 UEFA Cup Final, which Arsenal lost on penalties to Galatasaray.

== Career ==
Malz played in the youth team for SV Pfingstweide, blue and white Oppau and then at West Ludwigshafen. First club in the professional sector was in the 1992–93 season at second division side SV Darmstadt 98. His professional debut was on 7 August 1992 in the. Wuppertal SV (0–3). He scored for the first time on the 15th match day match against SC Freiburg (1–1). However, the season ended with the 24th and last place and Malz left the club.

Via VfR Mannheim (Oberliga Baden-Württemberg and Regionalliga Süd), in 1997 he joined TSV 1860 Munich in the Bundesliga. Under coach Werner Lorant Malz was able to establish itself in the first division, but played no further part in the Lorant squad after a disappointing return during the 1998–99 season in which the club took only ten points.

There was a transfer in 1999 to Arsenal, which turned out to be too large a step for Malz to play as a first team player. After only six appearances in the Premier League, he returned the Bundesliga in 2001 to 1. FC Kaiserslautern where he was only sporadically used, struggling with injuries. After Malz in December 2004 had criticised FCK coach Kurt Jara internally, he was demoted to the second team and then asked for the termination of his contract.

In early 2005 he went to Arminia Ludwigshafen, a planned move to Australia to Newcastle United Jets having failed. His last club was from 2006 the south-Oberliga FSV Oggersheim, with whom he climbed in the 2007 Regional. End of 2007–08 season he ended his career.

From January 2005 to May 2006 Malz was player-coach of FC Arminia 03 Ludwigshafen and held the job until May 2006. On 21 February 2008, he became new co-coach of the women's second-division club . 1 FFC 08 Niederkirchen . He was released on 2 November 2012.
