= Margriet (magazine) =

Dutch women's magazine

- Categories: Women's magazine
- Frequency: Weekly
- Circulation: 103,000 (2023)
- Founded: 1938
- First issue: 30 September 1938; 87 years ago
- Company: DPG Media
- Country: Netherlands
- Based in: Amsterdam
- Language: Dutch
- Website: Margriet
- ISSN: 0025-2956

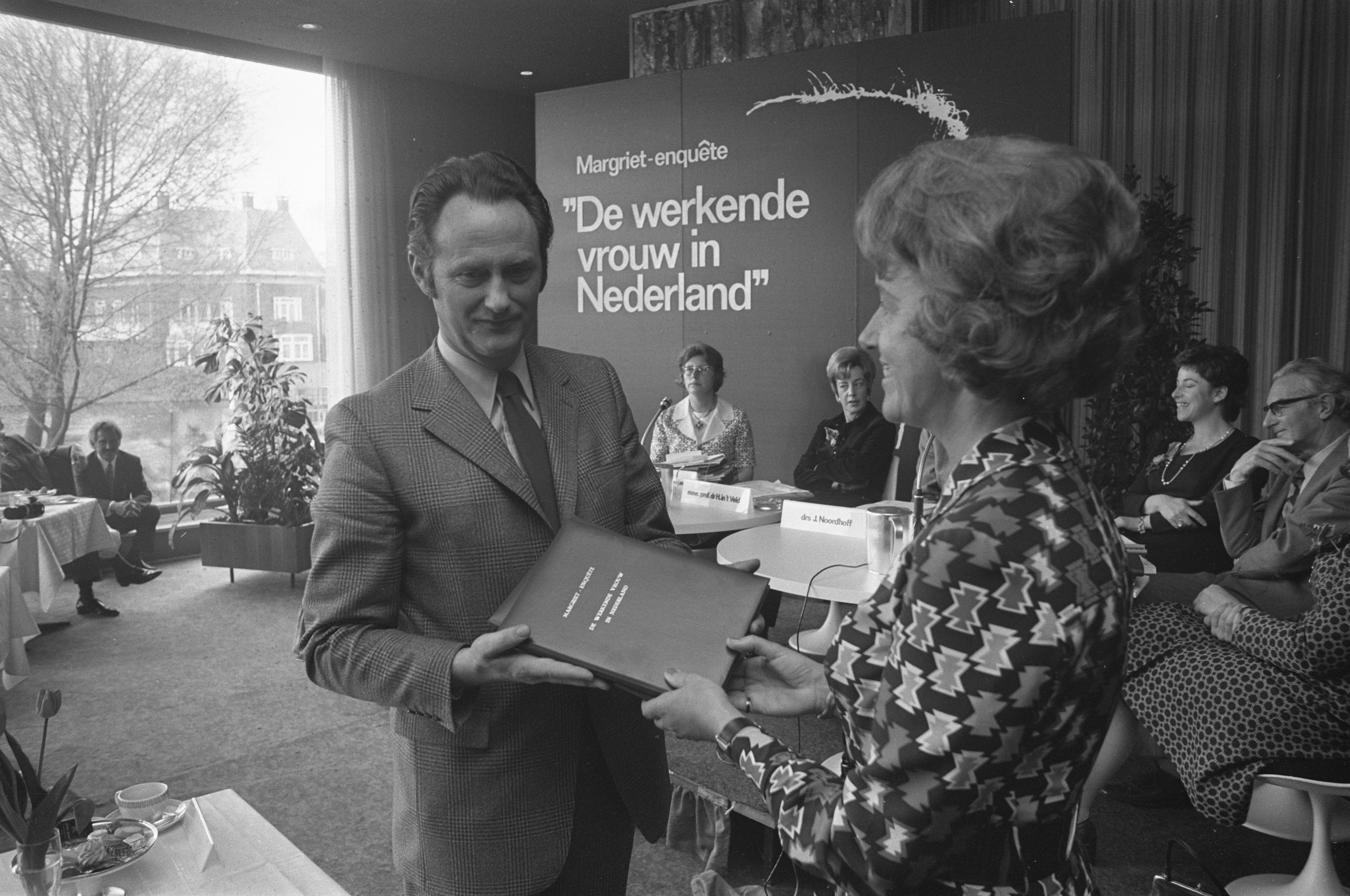

Margriet is a Dutch weekly women's magazine, which publishes articles on fashion, beauty, health, nutrition, relationships, and society. Formerly published by Verenigde Nederlandse Uitgeverijen, it is owned and published by Sanoma after the latter took over VNU's magazine division.

Established in 1938, Margriet once held the title of the most widely circulated women’s magazine in The Netherlands, attracting over a million weekly readers. For its first four years, nearly all its content was written by a single person, Alma van Eysden-Peeren. In the late 1960s, the magazine embraced feminism, gaining recognition—and sometimes controversy—for its inclusion of emancipatory content. Margriet broke new ground for a mainstream publication by conducting bold polls among its readers and actively participating in feminist initiatives.

== History ==
=== First decades: 1938–1960s ===
The first issue of the magazine debuted on September 30, 1938, published by Geïllustreerde Pers. Initially described as a "weekly for women and girls," it began as an appendix to the family magazine De week in beeld and became an independent publication in 1942. The origin of its name—Margriet, which in Dutch refers both to a girl’s name and flower's name—remains unclear.

For its first four years, Margriet was the work of a single person, Alma van Eysden-Peeren, who occasionally wrote under the pseudonym Els van Duin to create the illusion of a full editorial team. Despite her significant contributions, she was never in charge; until the early 1960s, the editor-in-chief was Anton Weehuizen, also editor-in-chief of the Geïllustreerde Pers. Van Eysden-Peeren remained involved with the magazine until the 1960s and was a longtime contributor to the advice column Margriet weet raad ("Margriet Knows Best").

In its early years, Margriet was modest in both format and presentation—printed in black and white and relatively short. It featured content that would define the publication for decades: recipes, articles on child care and motherhood, sewing patterns, letters and questions to the editors, interviews, and regular columns.

In April 1943, during World War II, Margriet was shut down by the German occupiers. The magazine reemerged after the war, resuming publication in November 1945 with Princess Margriet of the Netherlands featured on the cover of its first post-war issue. Weekly publication resumed in 1949, following the incorporation of two other magazines: Moeder en Kind ("Mother and Child") in 1948 and Cinderella in 1950. On October 25, 1952, the first issue of the Donald Duck weekly comic book, featuring Disney characters, was distributed for free with Margriet.

The magazine experienced its greatest growth between 1949 and 1953, reaching approximately 500,000 subscribers around 1950. Until the mid-1960s, Margriet maintained a mainstream appeal, marked by a tone of modesty, deference, and a focus on duty.

=== Emancipation: 1960s–1970s ===
Under the leadership of a new editor, Joop Swart, Margriet adopted a more journalistic approach in the mid-1960s, a period marked by socio-economic transformation in the Netherlands. By 1965, the magazine reached its peak circulation with 800,000 paying subscribers. During the late 1960s, it conducted a series of reader polls exploring private aspects of Dutch life. Reflecting the societal shifts of the era, Margriet began publishing content addressing women’s changing roles, including a 1967 series titled Tomorrow’s Woman, which drew inspiration from the growing feminist movement.

The feminist group Dolle Mina, continued to criticize the magazine as outdated and conformist. On February 20, 1970, they staged a protest by occupying the publisher’s headquarters, symbolically bringing cleaning supplies to mock what they saw as the magazine’s reinforcement of traditional gender roles. In reality, Margriet was more progressive than its critics acknowledged, serving as a precursor to explicitly feminist publications like Opzij. For example, in 1969 it published the survey Sex in Nederland, which explored topics like sexuality and emancipation, revealing, among other findings, that 60,000 married women had homosexual feelings.

In November 1970, Margriet initiated a large-scale feminist event, Op de vrouw af!, organized in collaboration with various organizations, including Man Vrouw Maatschappij and Dolle Mina. A later poll revealed that many attendees mistakenly believed it was solely a Dolle Mina initiative. The magazine also published articles advocating for free and legal abortion, prompting the Secretary of Health to summon the editor-in-chief for a reprimand, arguing that such topics belonged in medical journals, not mainstream publications.

In 1972, Margriet appointed Hanny van den Horst as its first female editor-in-chief; van den Horst had been with the magazine since 1945. In 1978, the publication received the LOF Award from the Lucas-Ooms Fonds, an award for "exceptional contributions in magazines and magazine journalism". The foundation recognized Margriet as the only magazine effectively promoting emancipation to a wide audience.

=== Decline: 1980s–present ===
The 1980s and 1990s marked a period of declining readership for Margriet. Its content evolved during this time, reflecting broader societal shifts. A 1982 study of Margriet and Libelle highlighted changes in how the magazine approached motherhood. In the 1960s, the focus was on "servitude and sacrifice," while the 1970s emphasized the child's education. By the 1980s, attention shifted toward the mother’s self-development and included greater consideration of the father’s role. By the 1990s, motherhood was less central to women’s magazines altogether.

Circulation of Margriet dropped from over 750,000 in the 1970s to 425,000 in the early 2000s to under 250,000 in the early 2010s. Despite these declines, Margriet continues to be one of the most widely subscribed magazines in the Netherlands.

The magazine occasionally publishes special issues, such as one dedicated to then-Prime Minister Mark Rutte in October 2015.

== Notable writers and columnists ==
- Wina Born, culinary journalist, who had a column in Margriet since 1959
- Hedy d'Ancona
- Mies Bouwman
- Liesbeth den Uyl
- Mat Heffels
- Walty Dudok van Heel

== Editors-in-chief ==
- A.J.A.M. Weehuizen 1938 – 1970
- Joop Swart 1970 – 1972
- Hanny van den Horst 1972 – 1981
- Winnie van Rossem 1981 – 1987
- Renie van Wijk 1987 – 1988 (interim)
- Rob van Vuure 1988 – 1991
- Aty Luitze 1991 – 1999
- Rob van Vuure 1999 – 2001
- Anneliese Bergman 2001 - 2008
- Leontine van den Bos 2008 – present
