= Wim Hora Adema =

Dutch children's author (1914–1998)

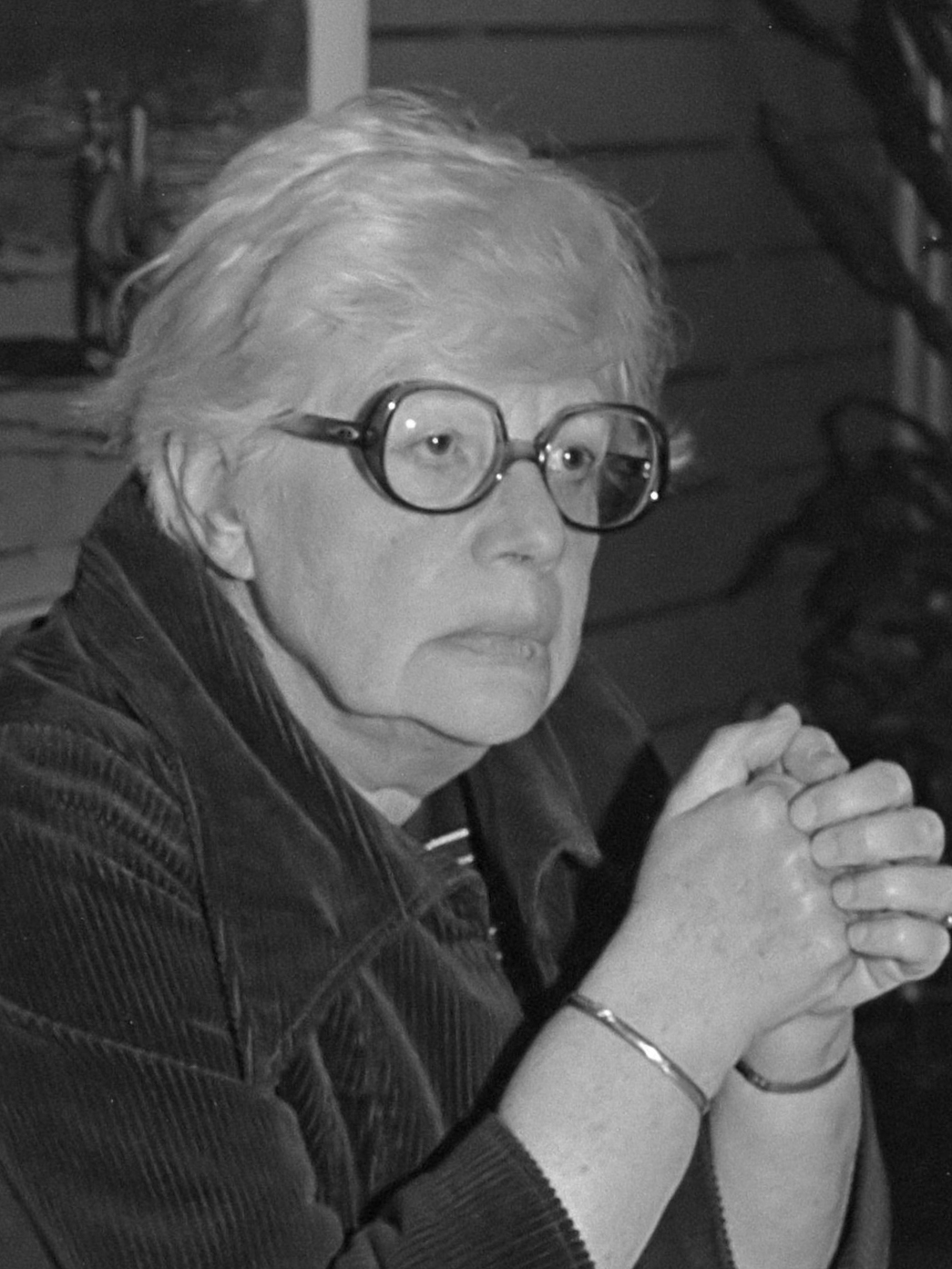
- Wim Hora Adema (1981)
- Born: 14 July 1914; Leeuwarderadeel
- Died: 10 December 1998 (aged 84)
- Occupations: Writer, journalist, editor, publisher
- Known for: Opzij

Wim Hora Adema (14 July 1914 – 10 December 1998) was a Dutch author of children's literature and a feminist, notable for being the co-founder of Opzij, founded in 1972 as a radical feminist monthly magazine. She was one of the best-known women of the Dutch second wave of feminism.

== Biography ==
Adema began her career as an unpaid worker for the Algemeen Handelsblad, a liberal Amsterdam newspaper; in 1939, she was appointed editor for the national section. She worked there until 1941, when she resigned as a protest against the anti-Jewish measures taken at the paper. During World War II, she was active in the Dutch resistance, which brought her in contact with the group that published Het Parool, an illegal resistance paper.

=== Parool and Voor de vrouw: 1940s to 1950s ===
After the war ended, Het Parool hired her as editor for national news. After three years, in 1948, Gerrit Jan van Heuven Goedhart, editor-in-chief of Het Parool, asked her to start editing a page for women and children, called Voor de vrouw (maar voor haar niet alléén...) ("for the woman, but not just for her"). which also published reviews of children's books. In that period she shared desks with authors such as Gerard Reve, Henri Knap, and Simon Carmiggelt, and was one of the people in Amsterdam around whom literary life was centered. Contributors of stories and verse to the "legendary" page included Hora Adema herself as well as authors and journalists such as Annie M.G. Schmidt, Jeanne Roos, and Harriët Freezer; for almost 20 years, Fiep Westendorp illustrated the column with black and white drawings that situated the position of woman in society. Adema worked for Het Parool for twenty-two years, during which time she helped nurture women authors and illustrators including Schmidt, Westendorp, Freezer, Hella Haasse, and Mies Bouhuys. In 1968 she was fired by editor-in-chief Herman Sandberg, which caused some uproar and even led to the firing of an editor at Vrij Nederland.

=== Feminist activism and Opzij, 1960s and after ===
In the 1960s, Hora Adama gained attention writing feminist newspaper columns. With Hedy d'Ancona, Joke Smit, Hora Adema started Man Vrouw Maatschappij (often abbreviated as MVM, and translated as "Man Woman Society"), a radical feminist action group considered the first Dutch Second-wave feminism organization and active until it was dissolved in 1988.

With d'Ancona, Hora Adema founded the radical feminist monthly magazine Opzij (the title translates as "move over") in 1972, together with politician and sociologist Hedy d'Ancona. Opzij is the only publication that has survived from the Dutch second wave of feminism and has a large and loyal readership. In 1972, the magazine printed 1,700 copies per month; by 1992 this had grown to 65,000, having developed itself "from a radical feminist pamphlet to a liberal-feminist opinion magazine with a large dose of human interest." In 1992, d'Ancona and Adema were awarded the Harriët Freezer ring, an award given to contributors to women's emancipation, honoring them for Opzij and other contributions. In 2007, printed over 94,000 copies per month, though today it is considered a more mainstream magazine, focusing more on general opinion than on activism.
