= Rooie Vrouwen in de PvdA =

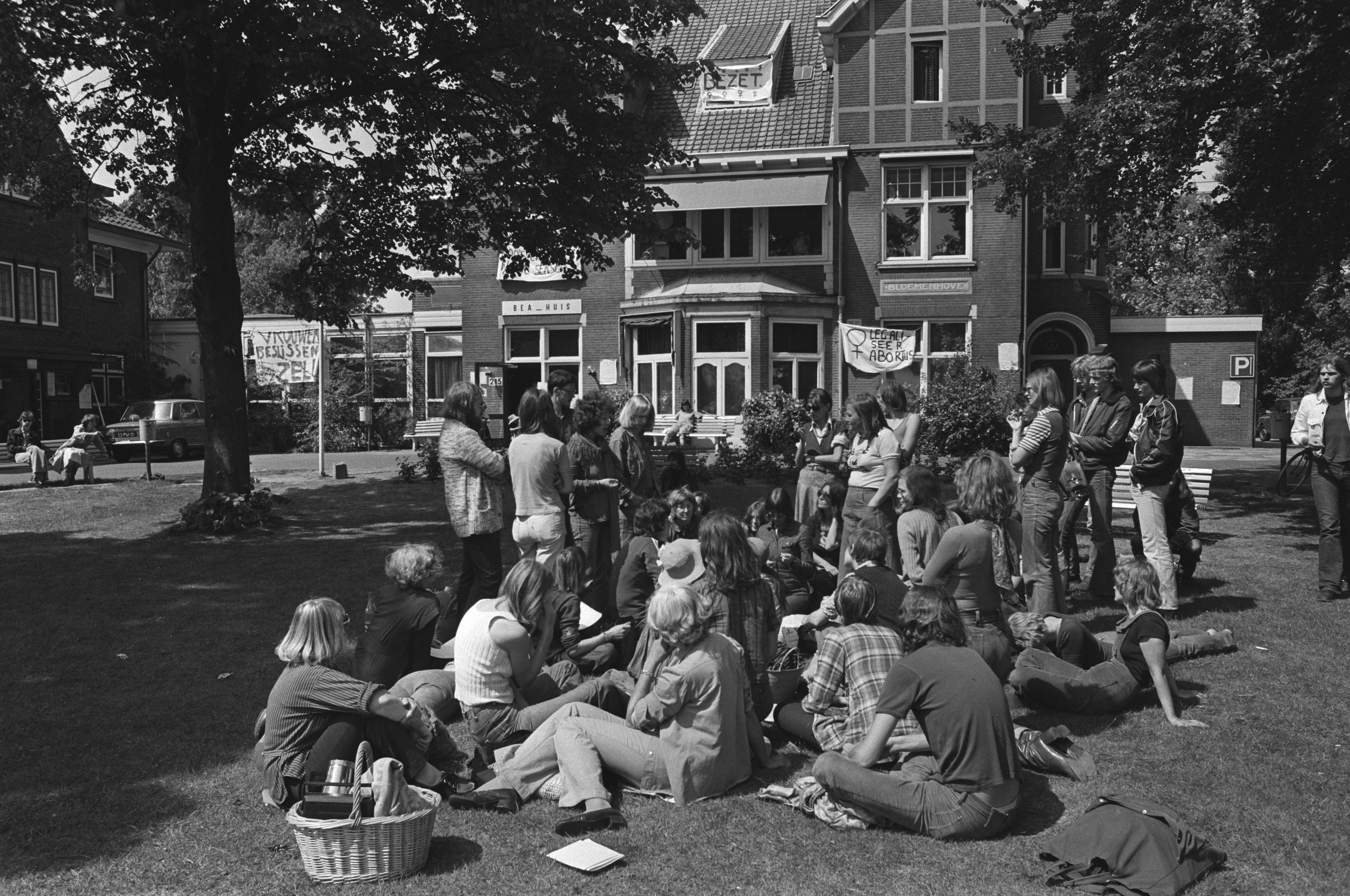
1976 occupation of abortion clinic

Rooie Vrouwen in de PvdA ("Red Women in the PvdA") was the name of a woman's organization active in the Dutch Labour Party, the PvdA.

The organization started as a union of women's organizations, called "union of social-democrat women's clubs at the time of the Social Democratic Workers' Party (Netherlands), one of the predecessors of the PvdA. The organization's goal was to emancipate the "masses of proletarian women". It owned a building named "De Born" in Bennekom, in the countryside, which allowed its members--at the time "proletarian girls"--the opportunity to spend some time outside of the cities where they worked. The organization was renamed Vrouwencontact in de PvdA in 1969, and from 1975 on Rooie Vrouwen in de PvdA, a more "catchy" name chosen to align the group with, and draw membership from, the second wave of feminism.

The feminist organization promoted equal rights and equal pay for women, as well as the redistribution of wealth and power, including within the PvdA itself. It made headlines in 1976 when it occupied an abortion clinic (the Beahuis & Bloemenhovekliniek in Heemstede), which then-Minister of Justice Dries van Agt threatened with closure.

In 1992 then-party leader Felix Rottenberg indicated he would cut the organization's funding; three years later, in 1995, the organization decided to stop being an independent group and integrate within the party, at first under the name Rosa-vrouwen-project, the reason being that a greater participation of women in politics was deemed a matter for the entire party, not just one part of it. It is allied with the Politiek Vrouwen Overleg (PVO), which is a collaboration of women of various political parties.

== Notable members ==
- Pijkel Schröder, the first president
- Hedy d'Ancona
- Mieke van der Burg
- Geke Faber
- Ien van den Heuvel
- Jeltje van Nieuwenhoven
- Liesbeth den Uyl
- Wil Velders-Vlasblom
