= Wil Velders-Vlasblom =

Dutch politician and activist (1930–2019)

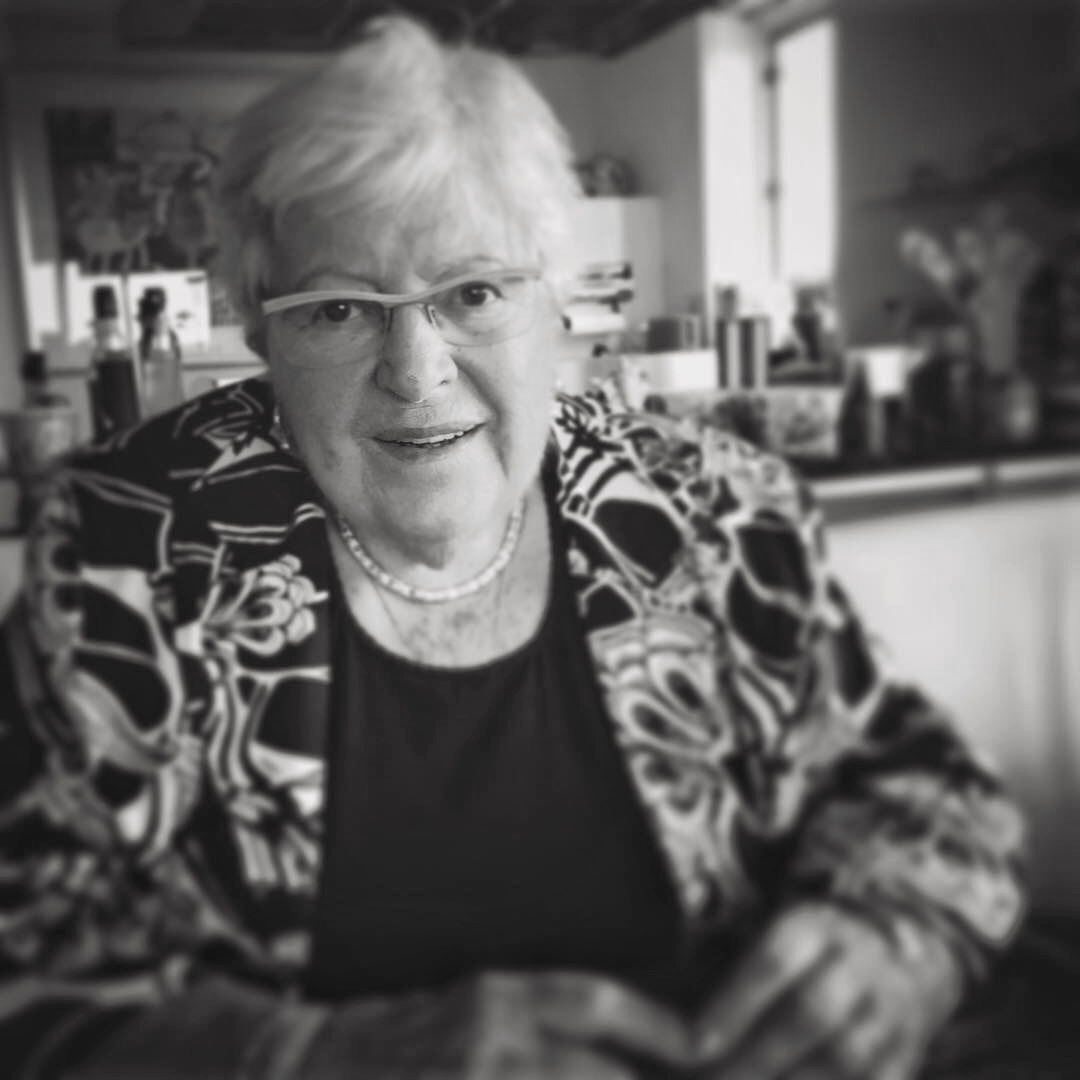
Wil Velders-Vlasblom

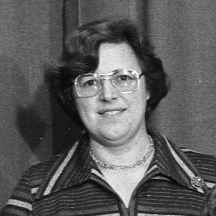
Wil Velders-Vlasblom (1977)

Wil Velders-Vlasblom (2 May 1930 – 20 January 2019) was a Dutch politician and woman's rights activist. She was the first woman alderman in Utrecht, and later served as mayor of Beverwijk. During the 1970s and a portion of the 1980s, Velders-Vlasblom was the face of the PvdA party in Utrecht.

== Early life and education ==
Wilhelmina ("Wil") Velders-Vlasblom was born in Schiedam, 2 May 1930. Her father was a coppersmith at a shipyard. She had four brothers. Velders-Vlasblom grew up in Rotterdam. Before World War II, her parents were members of the SDAP (predecessor of the PvdA) and she was then a member of the Arbeiders Jeugd Centrale (AJC). In 1943, the Meer Uitgebreid Lager Onderwijs (MULO) she was attending was bombed, and she was unable to finish school. At the age of sixteen, she studied an administrative law course through a trade union where she learned about the "pay gap".

== Career ==
After the war, she married and with her husband and young son, moved to Utrecht in 1950. Five years later, she became politically active in the PvdA, eventually becoming secretary of the Rooie Vrouwen in de PvdA, the women's organization within the party. Her activism included a woman's right to abortion. In 1969, she joined the Utrecht city council in 1969. In September 1974, she became the first woman alderman in Utrecht, and in November 1986, her appointment as mayor of Beverwijk followed. She retired from the position in June 1995. Velders-Vlasblom died in Utrecht, 20 January 2019 at the age of 88.
