= Wina Born =

Dutch journalist (1920–2001)

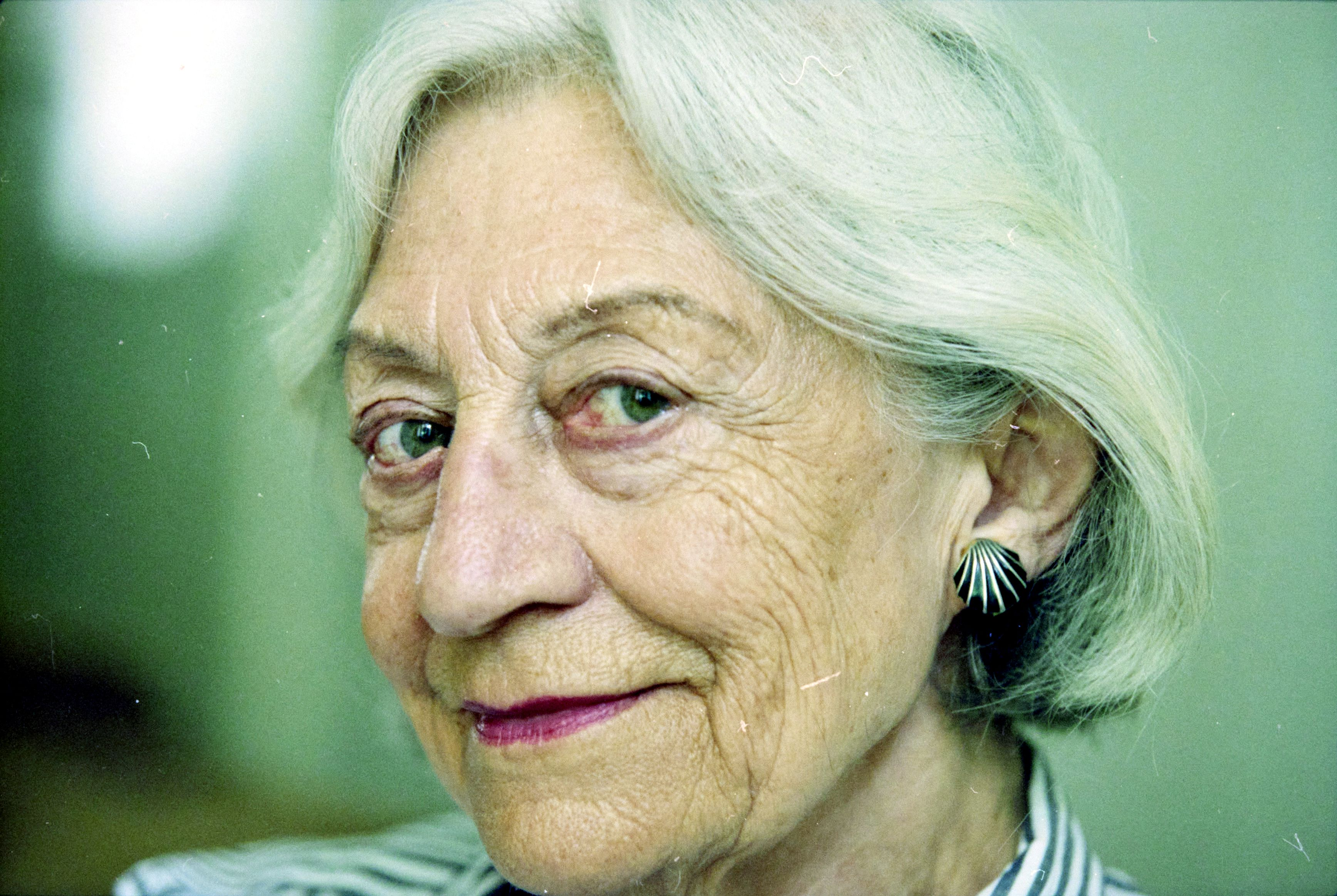
- Wina Born (Amsterdam, 1999)
- Born: 21 August 1920; Sliedrecht
- Died: 6 August 2001 (aged 80); Amsterdam
- Citizenship: Dutch

Wina Born-Meijer (Sliedrecht, 21 August 1920 – Amsterdam, 6 August 2001) was a Dutch journalist. She is often named as de moeder van de Nederlandse gastronomie (English: The mother of the Dutch gastronomy). She has written about a hundred cookbooks and countless articles in magazines, like Margriet and Avenue.

== Work ==
In 1949, Wina Born published her first articles in the newly founded monthly Wijn (English: Wine). In the sober years after the Second World War gastronomy and wine were virtually unknown in the Netherlands. Due to her weekly recipe-column in the magazine Margriet, with Libelle one of the major women magazines in the Netherlands, Born gained notoriety. She could also broaden the culinary horizon of the ordinary housewife, the main readers of the magazine.

In a later stage, Wina Born started writing articles about foreign kitchen styles and producing restaurant-reviews.

Between 1962 and 2000, Born wrote and translated more than a hundred books about wine and cooking. She also wrote articles for several newspapers, like Het Parool, and magazines.

For the "Stichting voor Academische reizen" she led yearly wine- and culinary trips to many different countries. In the period 1974–1997 she visited, amongst others, Turkey, Romania, Hungary and Bulgaria.

== Influence ==
In her early years as a journalist, "culinary journalism" was something new in the Netherlands. In the 1960s, Wina Born became very influential as a culinary journalist. Through her writings, she learned the ordinary man and woman to look beyond the classic Dutch kitchen style and look at foreign kitchens. She also taught them that eating out is a nice type of recreation and not necessarily expensive. Another effect was that cooks and chefs lost their anonymous place in the kitchen and became more well known or even celebrities.

== Honors ==
A selection of the honors Wina Born received:

- 1968: Werumeus Buning-prijs for culinary journalism
- 1975: Chevalier dans l'Ordre du Mérite Agricole
- 1986: Knight of the Order of Orange-Nassau
- 2008: Medaille D’Argent du Tourisme Français
- Unknown year: NCCK-ring by the Dutch society of head chefs
- Unknown year: Gastheerschapprijs by the "Société des Maîtres d’Hôtel Néerlandais"

== Legacy ==
In 1995, Wina Born, at her 75th birthday, was honored with the launch of the "Wina Born-prijs". The prize is given to living people, who, in the spirit of Wina Born, made gastronomy more accessible for the broad public. Originally the price was handed out by the Dutch "Stichting Vakopleiding Horeca" but in 2008 the "Netwerk in Gastronomie en Gastvrijheid" took over.

== Selective bibliography (all Dutch) ==
- Koken met wijn (1962)
- Wijn na vijven (1965)
- Lekker koken met kruiden (1967)
- De brave gehaktbal (1967)
- De Franse keuken (1968)
- Het volkomen vleesboek (1968)
- 12 Maanden lekker eten (1969)
- Beroemde gerechten uit de wereldkeuken (1970)
- Het volkomen wijnboek (1972)
- Het volkomen kookboek (1976)
- Het nieuwe Margriet kookboek (1978)
- Cognac & Armagnac (1981)
- De keuken van Avenue: recepten, restaurants, koks (1985)
- De Fagels: een culinaire familie en hun favoriete recepten (1985)
- Het hemelse gerecht: Chinese recepten uit de keukens van de 'Fine Eastern Restaurants' in Nederland (1990)
- 25 Jaar Nederlandse restaurantgeschiedenis (1992)
- Culinaire bijbel: eten en drinken in de bijbel (1998)
- Culinaire herinneringen (1999)
