= Monika Triest =

Belgian academic, writer, and activist

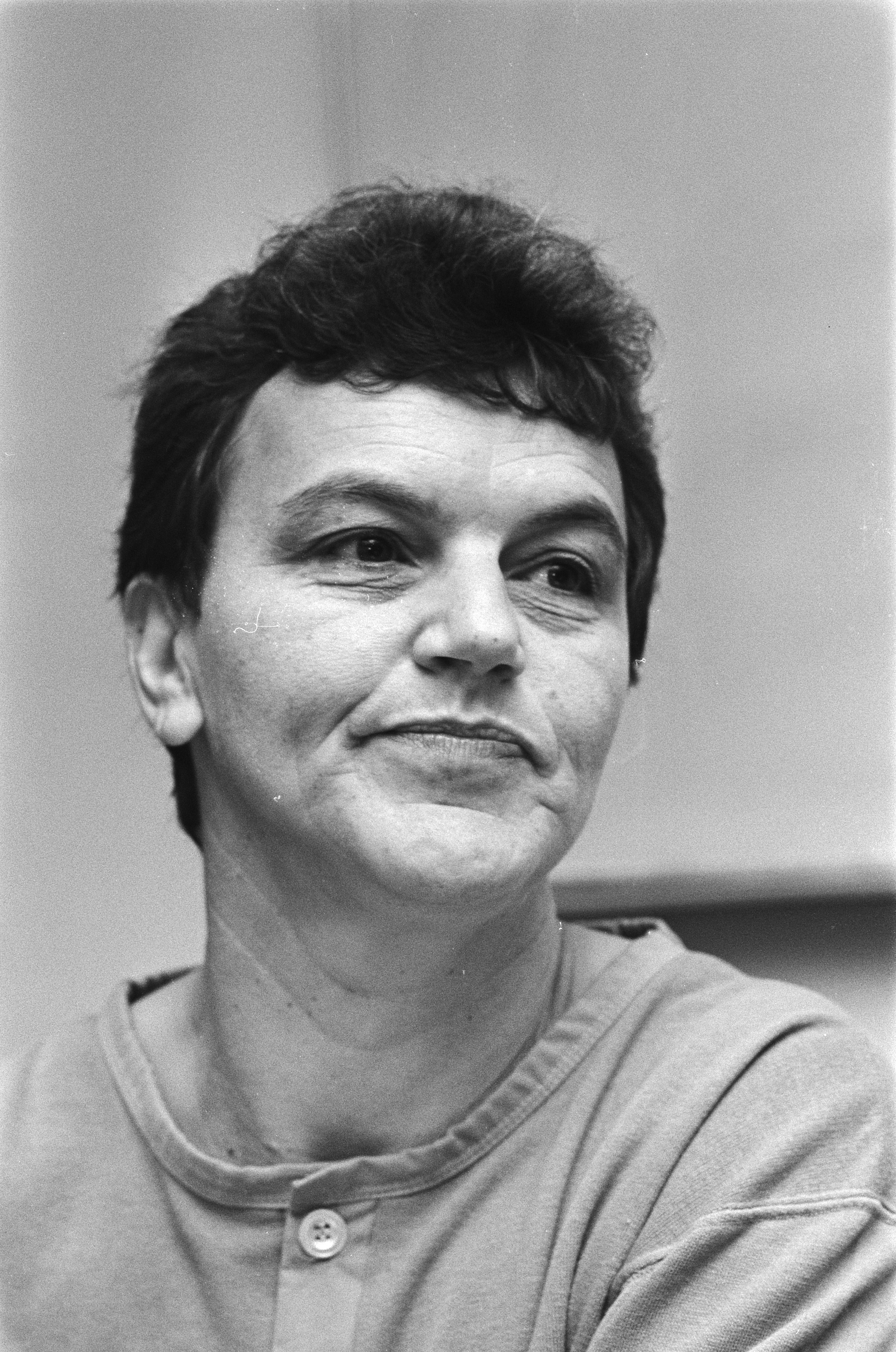
- First chair of women's studies at the University of Amsterdam, 1985
- Born: Monika Maria Triest; 1941 (age 84–85); Aalst, Belgium
- Other names: Monika Abicht, Monika Maria Abicht, Monika Abicht-Triest
- Occupations: Academic, writer, civil rights activist
- Years active: 1963–present

Monika Triest (born 1941) is a Belgian academic, writer, and civil rights activist. After earning a degree in classical philology at Ghent University, she moved to Canada to teach at the University of New Brunswick in 1965. Three years later when she moved to Yellow Springs, Ohio to teach at Antioch College, Triest became involved in the civil rights and women's liberation movements in the United States. She participated in demonstrations against the Vietnam War and in favor of Roe v. Wade. While she was earning her PhD at the University of Cincinnati, she and Sylvia Tucker offered one of the first women's study courses at the university in 1971. After earning her PhD in 1976, Triest returned to Belgium and in 1985 became the first chair of the women's studies program at the University of Amsterdam, and first women's studies professor in the Netherlands. She continued to teach at various educational facilities until her retirement in 2008.

== Early life and education ==
Monika Maria Triest was born in 1941 in Aalst, Belgium. She attended Catholic schools and was involved in her first protest action in the late 1950s, although it was not of her own volition. According to Triest, the administration of the school required all of the students to participate in a demonstration to oppose Léo Collard, who served at the Minister of Education for Belgium from 1954 to 1958. She studied Latin and Greek languages at Ghent University, and completed a Phd in classical philology. In 1963 married Ludo Abicht, a fellow student at the university. (Note: Ludo wrote Oorlogskinderen hebben grote ogen (Children of War Have Big Eyes) in 1987, which reviewer Marc Reynebeau stated was an autobiographical sketch with thinly veiled portraits of friends and family. In the book, Triest was called "Erika S.", according to Reynebeau, and it chronicles their involvement in the early 1960s student movement, their life in a commune, and their struggles to break free from their traditional upbringing.) While she was in Ghent, she became involved in anti-nuclear protests and participated in marches in Brussels. Both Abichts taught at a college in Blankenberge, but were let go because of their activism, and decided to go abroad in 1965.

== Career ==
=== Canada and the US (1965–1977) ===
Initially, the couple settled in Fredericton, and Triest (who during this time used the surname Abicht), began teaching at the University of New Brunswick. In 1968, the couple moved to Yellow Springs, Ohio and Triest worked as a lecturer at Antioch College. While teaching at the progressive school, she studied the roots of discrimination, exclusion and racism. She became active in the civil rights and women's liberation movements, and participated in protests against the Vietnam War and in favor of Roe v. Wade. She also began teaching a woman's study course "Advanced Seminar on Sex Roles: Sex Role Stereotyping in Schools with Sylvia Tucker in 1971 at the University of Cincinnati. At the time, there were only two women's studies courses being offered in Ohio, the other one being at Cleveland State University. The previous year the only women's offering available in Ohio was a no-credit, six-week course called "Strictly for Women" hosted by the University of Cincinnati, which would not establish an official Office of Women's Studies until 1974. Triest completed her PhD thesis Women's Leadership Roles in Two Selected Labor Unions in the United States and Belgium: A Comparative and Descriptive Study in 1976 and taught at Antioch through 1977.

=== Return to Belgium ===
Triest and Abicht had two children before their marriage began to fall apart and she returned to Belgium in 1977, settling in Antwerp. She became an editor for the journal Links en Feministisch (Left and Feminist) and became involved in the feminist-socialist movement, joining the activist group Vrouwen Overleg Komitee (Women's Consultation Committee, VOK). From 1981 to 1983, she served as chair of the VOK, and taught sociology at the Arbeidershogeschool (Sicuak Academy) in Brussels in 1984. Triest was hired as an extraordinary professor at University of Amsterdam in the economics department in 1985. Her three-year chair, was a part-time position and was designed to focus on women and work. Hers was the first appointment in the Netherlands for a professor in women's studies. By 1987, women's studies courses had also been launched under Iteke Weeda at the University of Groningen and Joyce Outshoorn at Leiden University, but each of their positions were part-time and with three-year contracts. Triest's contract was not renewed and she left Amsterdam in 1988. She then taught at the Free University of Brussels, and other educational facilities until 2008. Although she retired from teaching, Triest continued to publish works and began volunteering at the Hendrik Conscience Heritage Library in Antwerp.

== Research ==
Triest's work has often examined how marginalization impacts and controls social development of various sectors of society. Her study with Lou Gils on witches, Triest argued that the idea of witches was used to reinforce gender norms and behaviors. As representatives of women who had power and were not submissive, they served as a reminder to society of evil and reinforced proper behavior, including sexual purity and motherhood. Other works examined power and the impact that the succession of women rulers of the Netherlands in the fifteenth and sixteenth centuries had on societal ideas of traditional male sovereignty. In 2019, Triest returned to the United States for a reunion with some of her fellow activists from the 1960s and 1970s. Conversations with them, led her to write a book about the ongoing activism against racism, exploitation, and sexism in the Trump and post-Trump era. Each of those issues as well as the Red Scares targeting leftists and communists were prevalent in both periods. Triest believes that these issues will continue to be part of the fabric of American culture because activists on the one hand press for social equality, against the government and power structure's desire to maintain their authority and resist dissent.

== Selected works ==
- Abicht, Monika Maria (1976). Women's Leadership Roles in Two Selected Labor Unions in the United States and Belgium: A Comparative and Descriptive Study (D.Ed.). Cincinnati, Ohio: University of Cincinnati. OCLC 3123261.
- Abicht, Monika Maria; Dierckx, V. (1981). Het Vlaamse heksenboekje: een boek voor en door lesbische liefjes [The Flemish Witches' Book: A Book for and by Lesbian Lovers] (in Dutch). Ghent, Belgium: Masereelfonds. ISBN 978-90-6417-052-2.
- Abicht-Triest, Monika (1984). "Is de weg open naar positieve diskrriminatie? Praktijken en mogelijkheden in België" [Is the Way Open to Positive Discrimination? Practices and Possibilities in Belgium]. Tijdschrift voor Vrouwenstudies (in Dutch). 5 (4). Nijmegen, Netherlands: Socialistiese Uitgeverij Nijmegen: 418–433. ISSN 0167-8361.
- Triest, Monika (January–February 1988). "De vrouw in de wetenschap In Vlaanderen en Nederland" [The Woman in Science in Flanders and the Netherlands]. Ons Erfdeel (in Dutch). 31 (1). Rekkem, Belgium: Stichting Ons Erfdeel: 35–42. ISSN 0030-2651. OCLC 775314923.
- Triest, Monika (2000). Macht, vrouwen en politiek: 1477 – 1558; Maria van Bourgondië, Margareta van Oostenrijk, Maria van Hongarije [Power, women and politics: 1477 – 1558; Mary of Burgundy, Margaret of Austria, Mary of Hungary] (in Dutch). Leuven, Belgium: Van Halewyck. ISBN 978-90-5617-245-9.
- Triest, Monika; Gils, Lou (2002). Met de duivel naar bed: heksen in de Lage Landen [Sleeping with the Devil: Witches in the Low Countries] (in Dutch). Leuven, Belgium: Van Halewyck. ISBN 978-90-5617-440-8.
- Triest, Monika; Gils, Lou (2005). "Seksueel spel en overspel: Prostitutie in de zeventiende eeuw" [Sexual Play and Adultery: Prostitution in the Seventeenth Century]. Tijdschrift Streven (in Dutch). 72 (4). Antwerp, Belgium: Streven vrijplaats: 331–343. ISSN 0039-2324.
- Triest, Monika (2018). Wat zoudt gij zonder 't vrouwvolk zijn: een geschiedenis van het feminisme in België [What Would You Be Without the Womenfolk: A History of Feminism in Belgium] (in Dutch). Antwerp, Belgium: Uitgeverij Vrijdag. ISBN 978-94-6001-629-5.
- Triest, Monika (2020). Het andere Amerika: in de schaduw van Trump [The Other America: In the Shadow of Trump] (in Dutch). Antwerp, Belgium: Uitgeverij Vrijdag. ISBN 978-94-6001-869-5.
