= Avenue (magazine) =

Defunct Dutch magazine

- November 1988 cover of Avenue
- Frequency: Monthly
- First issue: 1965
- Final issue: 1994 (print)
- Country: Netherlands
- Language: Dutch

Avenue was a defunct Dutch glossy monthly magazine. In its original form it was established in 1965 and shut down in 1994. In 2001, publisher VNU restarted the magazine, surviving only four issues.

Its core public were women between 25 and 55 years of age. Its secondary public were men of that age range.

== History ==
In its early years, the magazine was influential. Joop Swart served as the editor-in-chief of the magazine, the culinary journalist Wina Born, photographer Ed van der Elsken and the authors Jan Cremer, W.F. Hermans and Cees Nooteboom contributed. At its height the magazine sold 125,000 copies a month.
