= Joke Smit =

Dutch feminist and politician (1933–1981)

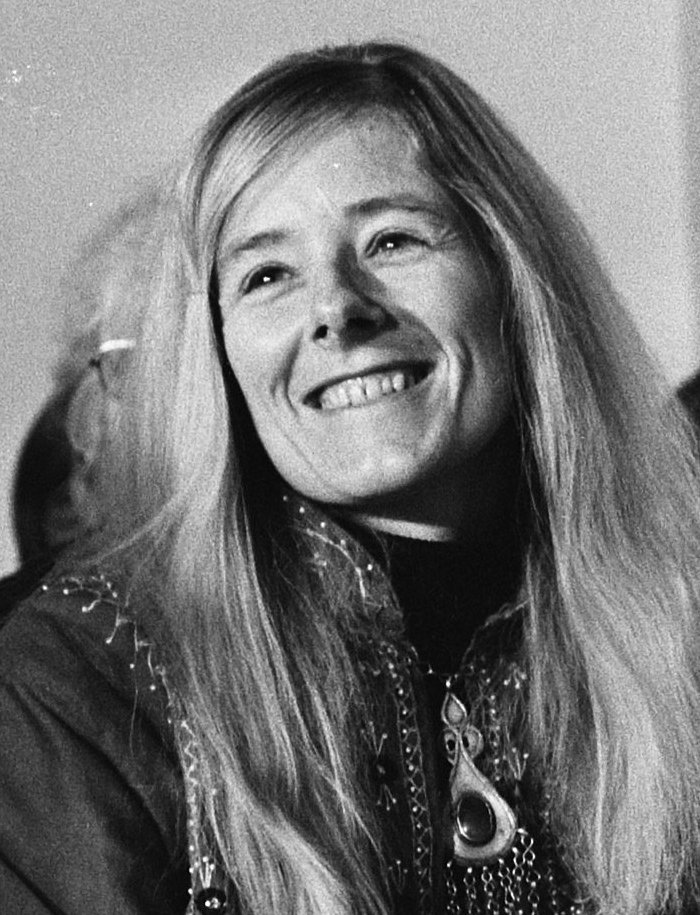
Smit in 1974

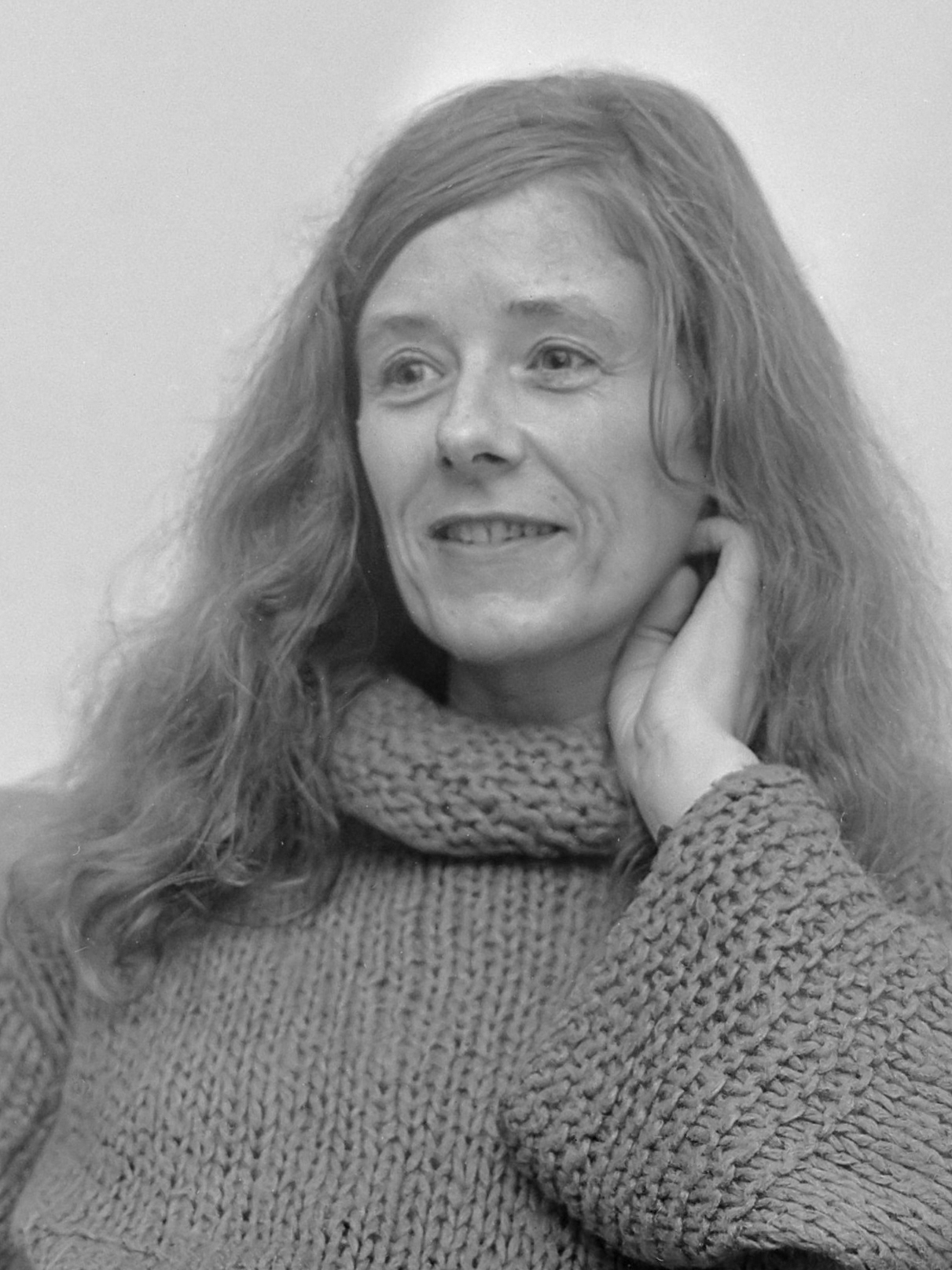
Smit in 1978

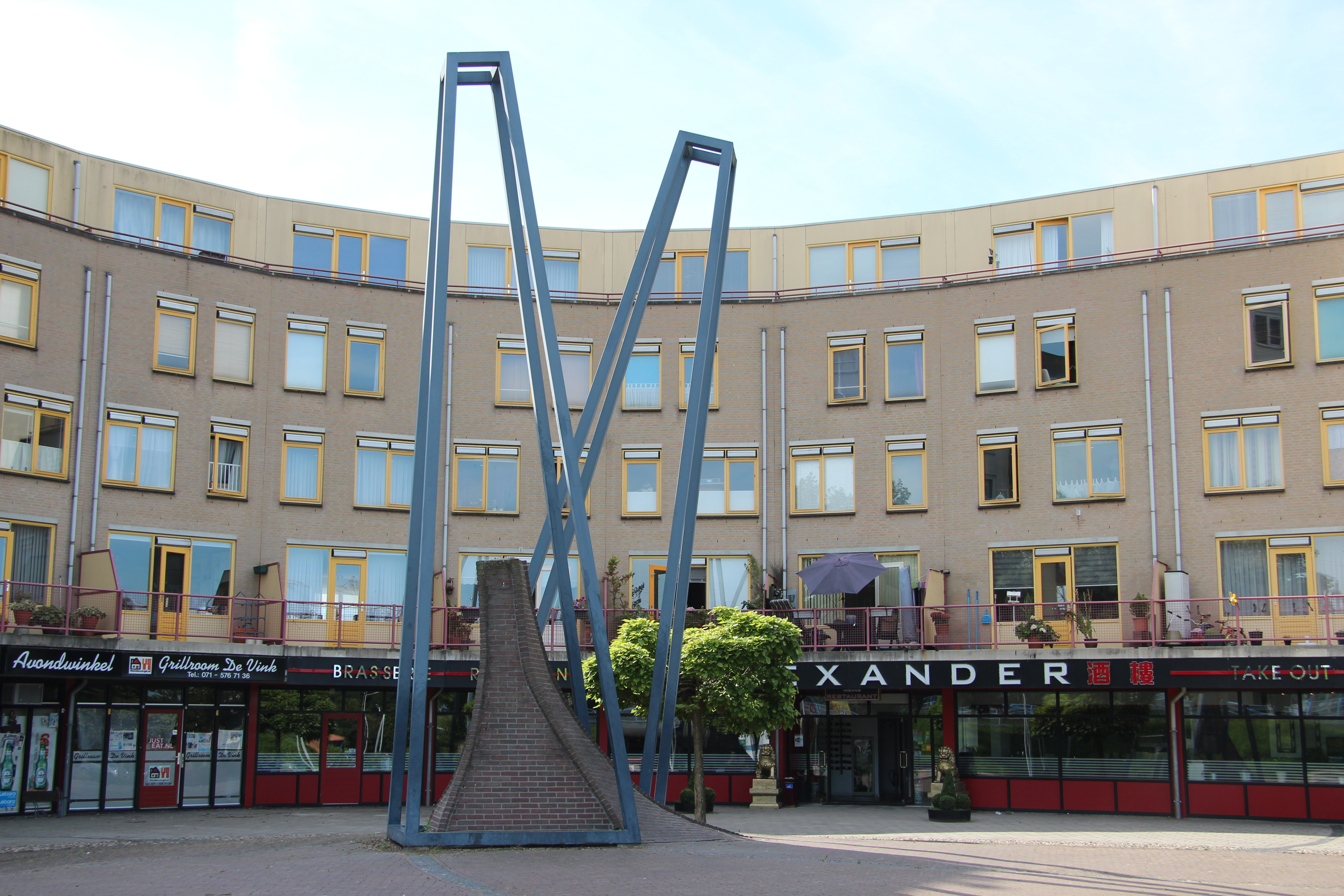
Monument in honour of Joke Smit in Leiden (by Cune van Groeningen)

Johanna Elisabeth "Joke" Smit (27 August 1933 – 19 September 1981) was a well-known Dutch feminist and politician in the 1970s.

== Personal life ==
Smit grew up in a reformed family of six children in Vianen. Her father was a teacher. She attended the Christelijk Gymnasium Utrecht and later studied French language and literature at the University of Amsterdam. She taught French at a number of schools between 1955 and 1966. In 1962, she worked a year in Paris as a freelance journalist, writing articles for the Dutch newspapers NRC and Het Parool. She was then appointed editor and secretary of the editorial staff of the literary magazine Tirade. She started to work as an associate professor at the Institute for Translation of the University of Amsterdam in 1966. A year later, she became a member of the Partij van de Arbeid (Labor Party). She represented this party in the municipal government of Amsterdam from September 1970 until September 1971. Smit also became editor of the party's scientific journal Socialisme & Democratie (Socialism & Democracy) in 1971. As a politician, she became affiliated with many committees, such as the Programmaraad TV (TV Program Council) for the NOS, the Committee Open School and the Emancipation Committee.

Smit married Constant Kool in 1956 and gave birth to two children. Her relationship with Kool ended in 1974. She had a relationship with Jeroen de Wildt from 1978 onwards. Smit died of breast cancer in September 1981 at the age of 48.

== Feminist activities ==
Smit gained a reputation as a feminist and an activist in 1967 when she published Het onbehagen bij de vrouw (The Discontent of Women) in De Gids in 1967. The publication of this essay is often regarded as the start of the second wave of feminism in the Netherlands. In this essay, Smit describes the frustration of married women, saying they are fed up being solely mothers and housewives.

Together with Hedy d'Ancona, Smit founded the feminist organization Man Vrouw Maatschappij (MVM) in 1968. Throughout the 1970s, Smit published articles on a range of topics: women's issues in politics, women's rights, emancipation for lesbian women, feminism and socialism, and education for girls and women.

Smit's was also known to the public for her progressive ideas about a new division in Dutch society between paid and unpaid labor. For instance, she argued that both men and women should work thirty hours a week to earn a living, which would consequently enable a division of a number of unpaid family- and household tasks between spouses.

The feminist magazine Opzij awarded Smit the Annie-Romein-Verschoor-prize in 1979.

== Legacy ==
Since Smit's death in 1981, various commemorations were made in her honour, such as a bi-annual Joke Smit-prize, a Joke Smit College, a Joke Smit Foundation, the Joke Smit-countries in Enschede, a Joke Smit Institute and the Joke Smit square in Utrecht. Various schools and streets in numerous Dutch municipalities were also named after her. A monument for Joke Smit was erected at the Alexandrine Tinneplein, near station De Vink in Leiden.

Feminist magazine Opzij republished Smit's essay Het onbehagen bij de vrouw in their 2007 special edition.

== Publications ==
- (in Dutch) 1967 - Het onbehagen bij de vrouw, De Gids, November 1967
- (in Dutch) 1969 - Rok en rol. Vrouw (en man) in een veranderende samenleving, samen met H. Misset en E. Engelsman, De Arbeiderspers – Amsterdam
- (in Dutch) 1972 - Hé zus, ze houen ons eronder. Een boek voor vrouwen en oudere meisjes, Bruna - Utrecht/Antwerpen
- (in Dutch) 1975 - De moeder van Marie kan méér. Gebundelde artikelen 1971-1975, Bruna - Utrecht/Antwerpen
- (in Dutch) 1984 - Er is een land waar vrouwen willen wonen, verzamelbundel

== Literature ==
(in Dutch) Marja Vuijsje: Joke Smit. Biografie van een feministe. Atlas, Amsterdam, 2008. ISBN 978-90-450-1430-2 (3rd. pr. 2010, Olympus: ISBN 9789046708132)
