= Joyce Outshoorn =

Leiden University professor emeritus

- Born: Joyce Victoria Outshoorn; 1944 (age 81–82); Hilversum, Netherlands
- Occupations: Political scientist, women's rights activist, women's studies academic
- Years active: 1970–2009

Joyce Outshoorn (born 1944) is a professor emeritus of Leiden University. She served as head of the Women's Studies Department from 1987 to 1999. Simultaneously between 1992 and 2000, she was chair of the Netherlands Research School of Women's Studies. From 2007 to 2011, she served on the Steering Committee of the Feminism and Citizenship project (FEMCIT) funded the European Union. She was honored with the Career Achievement Award for 2009 by the European Consortium for Political Research.

== Early life and education ==
Joyce Victoria Outshoorn was born in Hilversum, the Netherlands in 1944. She studied political science and contemporary history at the University of Amsterdam. During her schooling in 1965, she met Ivo Hartman, who was also studying political science and they became partners. She became active in the abortion fight, selling apples to raise funds for the Dolle Mina, a feminist activist group, that wanted to found an abortion clinic in Rotterdam. She was a participant in various protests of the group from 1970, including one in March of that year when the Dolle Minas exposed their stomachs showing the message "Baas in eigen buik" (Boss of your own belly) at a gynecological conference. The group was successful in raising funds and numerous clinics were established in the 1970s, allowing most women to have access to abortion, though it was still illegal. She combined her activism and her studies, writing her dissertation in 1972, De SDAP en het 'vrouwenvraagstuk', 1892–1920 (The Social Democratic Party and the 'Woman Question'), through an evaluation of the rise and fall of the turn-of-the-century women's movement and lack of response from the socialist labor party to women's demands. She graduated that year with a cum laude distinction in political science from the University of Amsterdam.

By the mid-1970s, Outshoorn was agitating with other activists for the creation of women's studies programs in the Netherlands. She was one of the founders in 1977 of the Sara Publishing Collective of Amsterdam. The goal of the publishing house was to not only allow women authors to publish their works, but to reverse the trend of women working for free or only on a volunteer basis. Around that time, she and Hartman had their daughter, Rian. Women were successful in their activism when in 1981, the Netherlands became one of the last Western European countries to abolish its ban on abortion. However, the law which was passed did not go into effect until 1984. In those years she conducted research at the University of Amsterdam. She also gave lectures in their summer offerings of women's studies and taught as an associate professor. In 1986, she earned her PhD from the Free University of Amsterdam which analyzed abortion legislation in the Netherlands between 1964 and 1984. Her doctoral supervisor was Jan van Putten, for whom she had served as a research assistant in the political science department during her studies.

== Career ==
In 1987, women's studies departments were launched under Monika Triest at the University of Amsterdam and Iteke Weeda at the University of Groningen, while searches were underway for professors to establish programs in Nijmegen, Utrecht, and Wageningen. Outshoorn was hired that year as the head of the women's studies department at Leiden University in a temporary 4-year program that granted a PhD in the field. Though she had majored in political science, the program fell within the Faculty of Social Sciences and was multi-disciplinary, employing instructors in pedagogy, psychology, and sociology. Though Outshoorn had negotiated a permanent post in Leiden, her contract specified that the appointment was dependent upon the success of her department. The goals of the program were not to investigate the differences in biology of men and women but to study power relationships and the effect of power in driving social inequality over time. The program was successful and moved to the Institute of Political Science in 1999, until her retirement in 2009. That year, she was honored with the Career Achievement Award by the European Consortium for Political Research.

In 1992, Outshoorn became the chair of the Netherlands Research School of Women’s Studies, a post she held until 2000. She worked as an expert for the Council of Europe between 1992 and 1994 on issues of gender and democracy. From 1996 to 2010, she was the co-director of the Research Network on Gender Politics and the State (RNGS). RNGS was formed in 1995 and was a network of academics from North America and Western Europe who were involved in evaluating and publishing materials pertaining to women's policy and the intersections between policy makers and activists. Simultaneously, Outshoorn served on the Netherlands Government Assessment Committee for Gender Mainstreaming between 2003 and 2007 and was a project leader for the European Union's FEMCIT (Feminism and Citizenship) Research Project from 2007 until 2011.

== Research and selected works ==
Outshoorn's research evaluated the politicization of women's issues and whether women's activism was effective in changing policy. From her initial review of the response of socialists to women's demands, to her evaluation of the trajectory of the abortion laws in the Netherlands, to her evaluation of prostitution laws across Europe, she questioned the impact women's movements had on driving and shaping state policy.

- Outshoorn, Joyce (1986). De politieke strijd rondom de abortuswetgeving in Nederland 1964–1984 [The Political Struggle Surrounding Abortion Legislation in the Netherlands 1964–1984] (PhD) (in Dutch). Amsterdam: Vrije Universiteit Amsterdam. OCLC 986720292.
- Lovenduski, Joni; Outshoorn, Joyce, eds. (1986). The New Politics of Abortion Reform. London: SAGE Publications. ISBN 978-0-8039-8006-8.
- Outshoorn, Joyce (1996). "The Stability of Compromise: Abortion Politics in Western Europe". In McBride-Stetson, Dorothy; Githens, Marianne (eds.). Abortion Politics: Public Policy in Cross-Cultural Perspective. New York: Routledge. ISBN 978-0-415-91225-9.
- Outshoorn, Joyce, ed. (2004). The Politics of Prostitution Women's Movements, Democratic States and the Globalisation of Sex Commerce. Cambridge, Cambridgeshire: Cambridge University Press. ISBN 978-0-511-48904-4.
- Outshoorn, Joyce; Kantola, Johanna, eds. (2007). Changing State Feminism. Houndmills, Basingstoke, Hampshire: Palgrave Macmillan. ISBN 978-0-230-51661-8.
- Outshoorn, Joyce, ed. (2015). European Women's Movements and Body Politics: The Struggle for Autonomy. Houndmills, Basingstoke, Hampshire: Palgrave Macmillan. ISBN 978-1-137-35165-4.
