= Veen Media =

Veen Media is a Dutch media company, owned by Arcis, known best as publisher of popular-scientific magazines. In January 2014 it took over the feminist magazine Opzij from Weekbladpers. As of 2014 it had thirty-five employees. Their office building, in the Amsterdam Houthavens neighborhood, was designed by Heyligers Design+Projects.
