= Liesbeth den Uyl =

Elisabeth Jacoba den Uyl-van Vessem
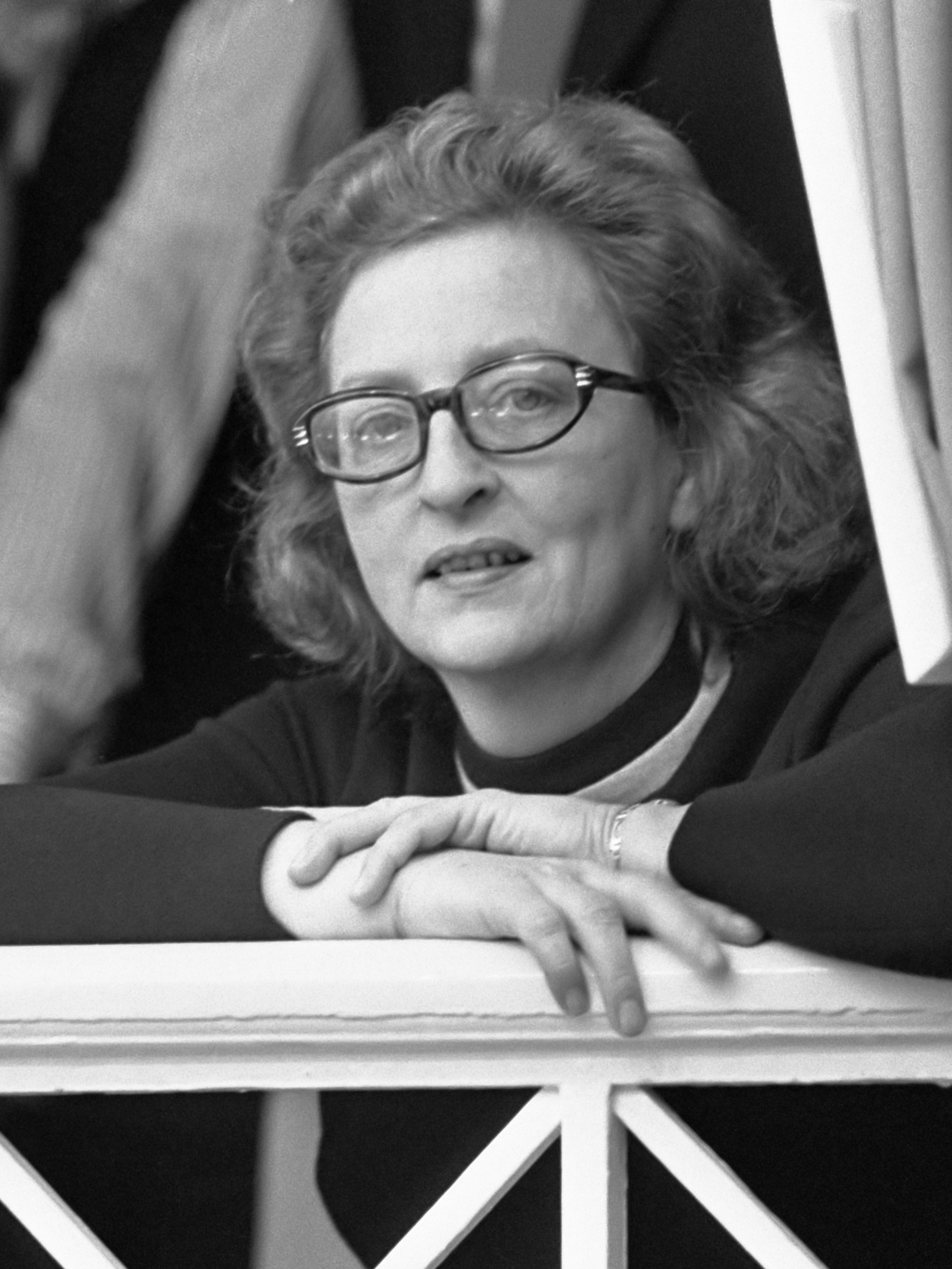
- Liesbeth den Uyl (1973)

Personal details
- Born: 18 June 1924 Amsterdam, Netherlands
- Died: 30 October 1990 (aged 66) Amsterdam, Netherlands
- Party: PvdA
- Spouse: Joop den Uyl (m. 1944; died 1987)
- Children: 7 including Saskia Noorman-den Uyl

Elisabeth Jacoba "Beppie" den Uyl-van Vessem (18 June 1924 – 30 September 1990) was a Dutch activist, politician, and writer, involved with the PvdA, the Dutch social-democratic party. She was the wife of politician Joop den Uyl (prime minister 1973 to 1977), and was socially and politically active. She wrote for magazines including Opzij (a feminist publication), Vrij Nederland (a left-off-center publication), Margriet (a women's magazine), and for Het Parool (an Amsterdam newspaper).

== Biography ==
Van Vessem was born in Amsterdam and graduated from the Hogereburgerschool, then studied psychology at university. When World War II broke out she had to interrupt her studies, and got a job with Querido, a Dutch publishing company. Around this time she met her future husband; they married on 30 August 1944 and between 1946 and 1965 had four daughters and three sons. She returned to her studies after the war, but stopped after the birth of her second child.

Liesbeth den Uyl was a member of an advisory council for the Omroepvereniging VARA, of the local council of the PvdA, board member of the Rooie Vrouwen in de PvdA and president of the Rooie Vrouwen's Amsterdam council, president of Steun Aan Argentijnse Moeders, a support organization for the Mothers of the Plaza de Mayo, and director of the local council for Buitenveldert.

After the death of her husband she wrote Ik ben niet goed maar wel gek, and later Beppie van Vessem, an autobiography. She died at age 66.

== Legacy ==
Two of her children went on to have notable careers in politic: Saskia Noorman-den Uyl (1946) was a member of parliament for the PvdA from 1994 to 2006, and Xander den Uyl (1953) was a secretary for the ABVA/KABO, a trade union. Barbara den Uyl (1949) became a filmmaker who directs documentaries on political and social matters.

The "Liesbeth den Uyl-van Vessem Stichting" is named after her, a foundation that advocates for the rights of women in countries under dictatorial governments, in particular the Argentinian Mothers of the Plaza de Mayo. The city of Deventer has a street named for her, and Amsterdam a bridge.
