= Dolle Mina =

Dutch feminist group

Dolle Mina (Mad Mina) is a Dutch feminist group, whose first action took place on 23rd January 1970. Dolle Mina campaigns for equal rights for women. It was named after an early Dutch feminist, Wilhelmina Drucker. Dolle Mina became a nationwide movement of women and men in the Netherlands and Flanders. It aimed to improve women's rights through playful and humorous protest demonstrations.

On 23rd January 2025, one of the four original initiators of Dolle Mina, Dunya Verwey, together with the black Dolle Mina of the group who started the movement in 1970, Claudette van Trikt, and film-scenario writer Sia Hermanides revitalised the movement successfully. Within months the movement reappeared nationwide with over 7,000 members organised in more than 40 cities in the Netherlands and Belgium.

== History ==
During World War II, ideas surrounding the role of women in society were in transition. Strong feminist values emerged in countries such as England, Germany and the United States, due partly to women being employed in factories or deployed in combat roles. During the post-war years, women who previously worked in factories were sent home and excluded from unions and other civil society organizations. In the Netherlands, working women were fired when they got married and married women were prohibited from independently performing legal acts such as the conclusion of a contract.

The concept of Dolle Mina stemmed from Dunya Verwey, Rita Hendriks, Michel and Alex Korzec. They were motivated by the Maagdenhuisbezetting (a major university sit-in) in Amsterdam in Summer 1969 and also received inspiration from campaigning black women in the United States. Dolle Mina became the driving force of the second wave of feminism in the Netherlands and Flanders.

Dolle Mina organised activist campaigns, including protests and publications, promoting women's rights to abortion, equal pay for equal work, childcare, and even access to public toilets. Dolle Mina drew attention to the unequal rights of men and women with playful public campaigns. In October 1968, the Man Vrouw Maatschappij (MVM, "Man Woman Society") had been founded; a Labour Party sympathetic action group in parliament that aimed to exert influence to improve women's rights. However, the founders of Dolle Mina saw MVM as a conformist club that was part of the established order, so it opted for other purposes and methods. Some Dolle Mina members saw MVM as reformist, whereas they saw themselves as members of a new "grassroots" seeking more fundamental change and a democratic socialist society. Groups at the bottom of the community ("the base") had to be mobilized. They brought attention to the struggle of women to gain equality in trade unions, which typically avoided expanding the rights of women members because this was perceived as requiring concessions by male "breadwinners". This turned off some, including Ton Regtien.

== Notable members ==
The founders of the movement were Dunya Verwey, Michael Korzec, and Alex Korzec and Rita Hendriks. Others who joined included Anne Marie Huub and her husband Philippens, Nora Rozenbroek, Friedl Baruch, Claudette van Trikt, Selma Leydesdorff, Marjan Sax, Miklos Racz, Loes Mallée, and Henriëtte Schatz. Joyce Outshoorn, who later was the first director of the women's studies department at Leiden University joined the group in 1970.

== Media, strategy and tactics ==
Dolle Mina attracted media coverage, mainly for its publicity-gathering events, which helped to establish the idea that well-organised and well-documented protests could contribute to the movement and could prompt a reaction from women's emancipation movements in surrounding countries, such as Belgium and Germany.

The first such event was the January 1970 storming of Nijenrode Castle, a private business university that was only open for men at the time. This was followed by the burning of a woman's corset at Wilhelmina Drucker's statue, the blocking of public urinals with pink ribbons to protest against the absence of public toilets for women, and cat calling men in the streets of Amsterdam. Within a few weeks, Dolle Mina had drawn thousands of followers, first in Amsterdam, followed by the rest of the Netherlands and even Belgium. The group also 'kidnapped' movie-maker Pim de la Parra, for being the organiser of a beauty pageant. On 1 March 1970, Outshoorn participated with a group of Dolle Minas supporting abortion access rights who exposed their stomachs across which was written "Baas in eigen buik" (Boss of your own belly) at a major gynaecological conference.

Most of the acts were carried out several days apart, which resulted in weeks-long headlines about the Dolle Mina movement. The movement provided the media with 'ready-made' news, such as the pink ribbon demonstration. Activists for public events were selected for their media appeal. Their use of the media, combined with shock and/or materials displayed in an unconventional way, was a significant reason for the success of the movement.

From inception, Dolle Mina made use of topic-specific working groups, mostly focused on issues such as abortion rights, daycare centres, equal payment for equal work and helping single mothers, but also including a theory group focused on education.
