= Man Vrouw Maatschappij =

Dutch feminist group

1973 news item on the 5-year anniversary of the MVM.

Man Vrouw Maatschappij (MVM, "Man Woman Society") was a Dutch feminist action group founded in October 1968 by Joke Smit and Hedy d'Ancona. The group emerged following the publication of Smit's influential feminist article, Het onbehagen bij de vrouw ("The Discontent of Women"), in November 1967.

MVM adopted a more radical approach after the establishment of Dolle Mina, another feminist group. MVM participated in various feminist actions, including the notable 1970 event Op de vrouw af!

The group was firmly anti-hierarchical, opposing patriarchy and functioning without a formal leadership structure. In 1973, MVM decided to exclude men from membership, prompting d'Ancona and others to leave the organization.
