= Hedy d'Ancona =

Dutch politician (born 1937)

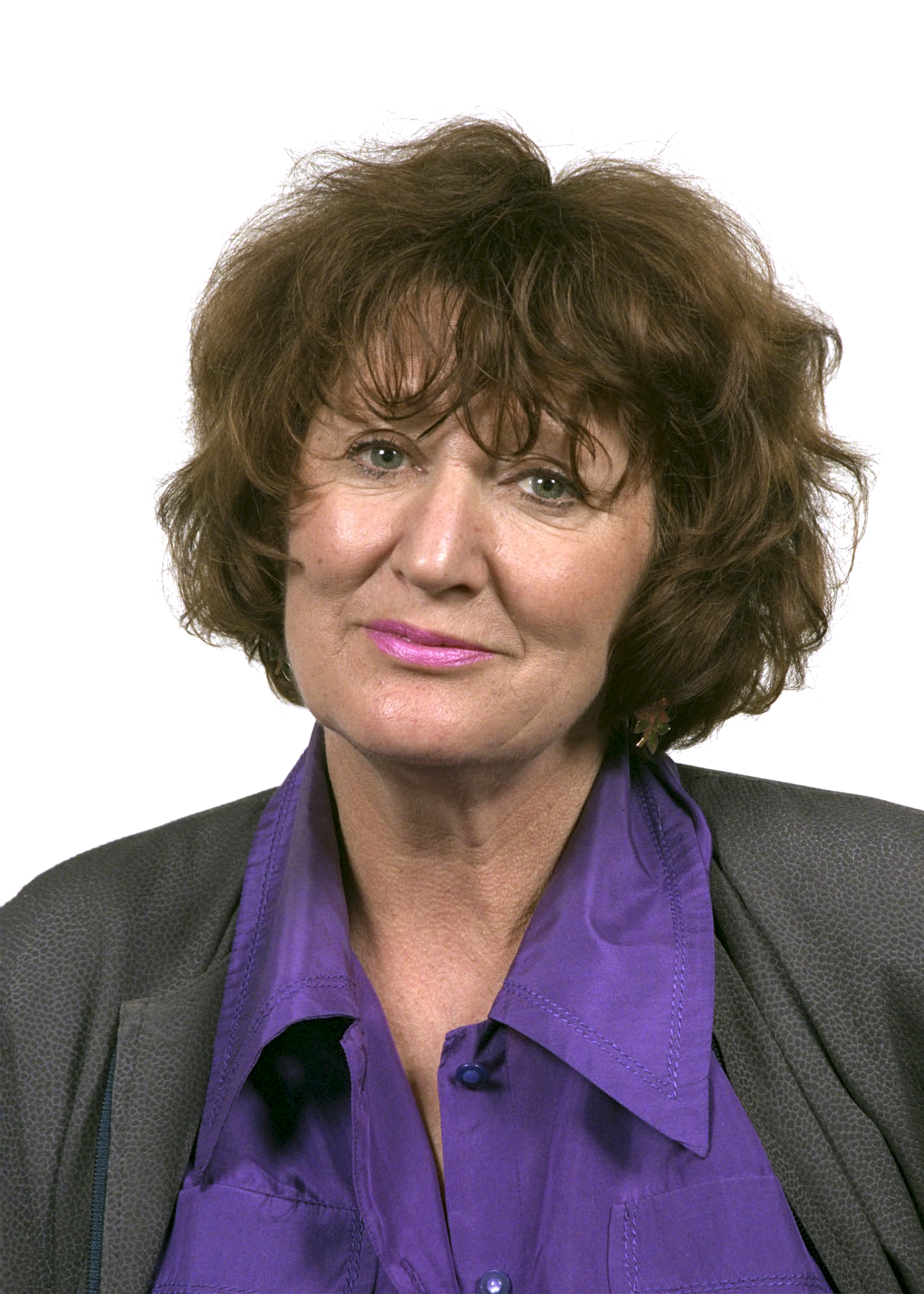
- d'Ancona in 1994

Minister of Welfare, Health and Culture
- In office 7 November 1989 – 16 July 1994
- Prime Minister: Ruud Lubbers
- Preceded by: Elco Brinkman
- Succeeded by: Jo Ritzen (ad interim)

Member of the European Parliament
- In office 19 July 1994 – 20 July 1999
- In office 24 July 1984 – 7 November 1989
- Parliamentary group: Party of European Socialists
- Constituency: Netherlands

State Secretary for Social Affairs and Employment
- In office 11 September 1981 – 29 May 1982 Serving with Ien Dales
- Prime Minister: Dries van Agt
- Preceded by: Louw de Graaf
- Succeeded by: Piet van Zeil

Member of the Senate
- In office 31 August 1982 – 13 September 1983
- In office 17 September 1974 – 11 September 1981

Personal details
- Born: Hedwig d'Ancona; 1 October 1937 (age 89) The Hague, Netherlands
- Party: Labour Party (from 1960)
- Spouse: Guus de Boer (m. 1963; div. 1972)
- Domestic partner(s): Ed van Thijn (1973–1979); Berend Boudewijn (1983–1987); Aat Veldhoen (since 1999)
- Children: Hajo de Boer (born 1969); Hadassah de Boer (born 1971)
- Education: University of Amsterdam
- Occupation: Politician; sociologist; social geographer; researcher; journalist; editor; television producer; nonprofit director; author; political pundit; lobbyist; activist

Hedwig "Hedy" d'Ancona (Dutch: [ˈɦɛtʋɪx ˈɦeːdi dɑŋˈkoːnaː]; born 1 October 1937) is a retired Dutch politician of the Labour Party (PvdA) who served as Minister of Welfare, Health and Culture between 1989 and 1994.

== Biography ==
=== Education and early career ===
Hedwig d'Ancona was born in The Hague in the Netherlands on 1 October 1937. She applied at the University of Amsterdam in June 1956 majoring in Sociology and obtaining a Bachelor of Social Science degree in June 1958 before graduating with a Master of Social Science degree in July 1962. d'Ancona worked as a television producer for the VARA from November 1962 until September 1965 and as a researcher at the University of Amsterdam from September 1965 until November 1972. d'Ancona also worked as a political activist in the feminism movement and co-founded the feminist action group Man Woman Society in October 1968. d'Ancona worked as editor-in-chief of the feminist magazine Opzij from November 1972 until September 1981.

=== Politics ===
d'Ancona was elected to the Senate in the 1974 Senate election, taking office on 17 September 1974 serving as a frontbencher chairing the parliamentary committee for Housing and Spatial Planning and the parliamentary committee for Culture, Recreation and Social Work and spokesperson for emancipation and gender equality. After the election of 1981 d'Ancona was appointed as State Secretary for Social Affairs and Employment in the Van Agt II cabinet, taking office on 11 September 1981. The Van Agt II cabinet fell just seven months into its term on 12 May 1982 and continued to serve in a demissionary capacity until the first cabinet formation of 1982 when it was replaced by the caretaker Van Agt III cabinet on 29 May 1982 and she subsequently returned to the Senate following the resignation of Clovis Cnoop Koopmans, taking office on 31 August 1982 serving as a frontbencher and spokesperson for health, emancipation, gender equality and abortion. In June 1983 d'Ancona announced that she would not stand for the 1983 Senate election and continued to serve until the end of the parliamentary term on 13 September 1983. d'Ancona Rooy was elected as a Member of the European Parliament in the 1984 European Parliament election, taking office on 24 July 1984.

After the 1989 general election d'Ancona was appointed as Minister of Welfare, Health and Culture in the Lubbers III cabinet, taking office on 7 November 1989. In April 1994 d'Ancona announced that she would not stand for the 1994 general election but wanted tot return to the European Parliament. On 16 July 1994 d'Ancona resigned as Minister of Welfare, Health and Culture after she was elected again to the European Parliament, serving from 19 July 1994 until 20 July 1999.

d'Ancona was a lijstduwer on the shared GroenLinks–PvdA list in the June 2024 European Parliament election. She received enough preference votes to be elected, but she declined her seat.

=== Other activities ===
Outside of government, she is known for starting the feminist monthly Opzij as well as the special interest lobbying group, Man-Vrouw-Maatschappij (Man-Woman-Society), which she co-founded with Joke Smit. d'Ancona gave the 2015 Mosse Lecture, titled Voorbij de M/V-maatschappij? (Beyond the M/F society?).

From April 1995 through June 2004, d'Ancona was Chairwoman of Oxfam Novib (Oxfam Netherlands), serving also as vice-chairman of Oxfam International during part of her tenure.

=== Career ===
- 1962 - 1965: TV-producer for the VARA
- 1965 - 1975: Researcher in social geography at the University of Amsterdam
- 1974 - 1981: Member of the first chamber of Dutch parliament, for the Labour Party.
- 1975 - 1981: Director of Centrum Beleidsadviserend Onderzoek (Cebeon), a company that offers research-based advice to government and non-profit organisations, with Maurice de Hond
- September 1981 - May 1982: Secretary of State, Ministry of Welfare and Employment
- August 1982 - September 1983: Member of Parliament
- 1984-1989: Member of the European Parliament
- 1989-1994: Minister of Welfare, Health and Culture
- 1994-1999: Member of European Parliament

== Honours and decorations ==
In 1992, Hedy d'Ancona was awarded the Harriet Freezerring, a women's liberation prize, by the monthly Opzij she started. In 1994, she was named as a Knight of the Order of the Netherlands Lion. In 2002, she won the Aletta Jacobsprijs, a women's emancipation prize awarded by University of Groningen every two years.

Honours
Ribbon bar	Honour	Country	Date	Comment
	Commander of the Order of the Netherlands Lion	Netherlands	8 October 1994	Elevated from Knight (9 September 1982)

== Electoral history ==
Electoral history of Hedy d'Ancona
Year	Body	Party	Pos.	Votes	Result		Ref.
Year	Body	Party	Pos.	Votes	Party seats	Individual	Ref.
2024	European Parliament	GroenLinks–PvdA	19 (Note: d'Ancona participated as a lijstduwer.)	21,633	8	Won (Note: d'Ancona received enough preference votes to be elected despite her party's result. However, she declined her seat.)	
2025	House of Representatives	GroenLinks–PvdA	80	2,534	20	Lost	

== Notes ==
Political offices
Preceded by Louw de Graaf	State Secretary for Social; Affairs and Employment; 1981–1982; With: Ien Dales	Succeeded by Piet van Zeil
Preceded by Elco Brinkman	Minister of Welfare, Health and Culture; 1989–1994	Succeeded by Jo Ritzen; Ad interim
Non-profit organization positions
Preceded by Bas de Gaay Fortman	Chairwoman of the Supervisory board of Oxfam Novib; 1995–2004	Unknown
