= Opzij =

Dutch feminist monthly magazine

- October 2011 issue featuring Eva Jinek
- Editor: Hans van Brussel (a.i.)
- Former editors: Cisca Dresselhuys, Margriet van der Linden
- Frequency: Quarterly (as of 2024)
- Founded: 1972; 54 years ago
- First issue: November 1972
- Country: Netherlands
- Language: Dutch
- Website: opzij.nl
- ISSN: 0166-2007

Opzij is a mainstream Dutch feminist monthly magazine. The title means "out of the way!"

== History and profile ==
Opzij was founded as a radical feminist magazine in November 1972 by Wim Hora Adema (1914–1998) and Hedy d'Ancona (1937). Former editors were Cisca Dresselhuys, who retired in 2008, and Margriet van der Linden. The magazine calls itself the "only opinion magazine for women," and considers itself a part of the women's movement. It is published on a monthly basis.

The magazine currently contains articles about women and women's issues, as well as "lifestyle" sections. It also has a reputation for publishing stories about and studies of female sexuality in the Netherlands. For many years, Opzij was a yardstick to measure Dutch women's attitudes; for instance, a 2002 study investigated Dutch women's opinions on relationships and sexuality based largely on empirical evidence of the changes Opzij and its readership have experienced since its founding. The publisher and owner of the magazine was Weekbladpers.

In 2014, its owner, Weekbladpers, sold the magazine as part of an organizational restructuring prompted by declining sales numbers for magazines. NRC Handelsblad reported Opzij's circulation as 44,000 copies in May 2014, down about 50% over the previous decade. The new owner, Veen Media, employed some thirty-five people, five of which with Opzij. Veen had been publishing popular-science magazines, including New Science; that magazine's editor, Irene van Bel, succeeded Daphne van Paassen (interim editor since 2003, after the departure of Margriet van der Linden) at Opzij.

In 2017 publisher Hans van Brussel bought Opzij. Marianne Verhoeven was chief-editor from 2017-2022. Van Brussel changed Opzij into a quarterly 'bookazine' in 2024.

== Harriet Freezerring ==
Since 1978 Opzij awards an emancipation award named for Dutch journalist and author Harriët Freezer. Notable winners include Nahed Selim (2006), Elsbeth Boor and the Clara Wichmann Institute (2005), Ayaan Hirsi Ali (2004), Hedy d'Ancona (1992), and Ellen 't Hoen (1989).
