= Adamson (surname) =

Origin
- Meaning: "son of Adam"
- Region of origin: Anglo-Saxon

Adamson is an English patronymic surname meaning "son of Adam". It is rare as a given name, although there has been a tradition in some families for the first-born son to be called Adam. People with the surname Adamson include:

== A ==
- Adam Adamson (1884–1984), New Zealand businessman
- Agar Adamson (1865–1929), Canadian Light Infantry officer
- Agar Rodney Adamson (1901–1954), Canadian politician
- Al Adamson (1925–1995), American B-grade horror movie director
- Alan Adamson (born 1963), Scottish football manager
- Alan Joseph Adamson (1857–1928), Canadian politician
- Alexander Adamson (1921–1983), Scottish Anglican cleric
- Amandus Adamson (1855–1929), Estonian sculptor and painter
- Amy Hannah Adamson (1893–1963), Australian educator
- Anders Adamson (born 1957), Swedish cyclist
- Andrew Adamson (born 1966), New Zealand film director
- Anthony Adamson (1906–2002), Canadian architect, author, teacher and municipal politician
- Arthur Adamson (1882–1966), Australian rules football player
- Arthur W. Adamson (1919–2003), American chemist
- Ashley Adamson, British dietician

== B ==
- Barry Adamson (born 1958), English rock musician
- Bartlett Adamson (1884–1951), Australian author
- Bert Adamson (1914–1995), Scottish footballer
- Bertha Drechsler Adamson (1849–1924), Canadian violinist
- Billy Adamson (1944–2013), Scottish musician
- Bob Adamson (Robert Wilson Adamson), Australian rugby union player
- Bobby Adamson, Scottish footballer
- Brian Adamson, former Australian rules footballer
- Bruce Adamson, New Zealand jurist in Scotland

== C ==
- Callum Adamson, British businessman and musician
- Campbell Adamson (1922–2000), British industrialist
- Carey Adamson (1942–2019), Royal New Zealand Air Force officer
- Catherine Adamson (1868–1925), New Zealand farmer and diarist
- Charles Adamson (sculptor) (1880–1959), Scottish-Canadian sculptor
- Charles Lodge Adamson (1906–1979), English cricketer
- Charlie Adamson (1875–1918), English rugby union player
- Chris Adamson (born 1978), English footballer
- Christine Adamson (born 1962/1963), Australian judge
- Christopher Adamson (1949–2025), British actor
- Chuck Adamson (1936–2008), American police officer
- Chuck Adamson (ice hockey) (born 1938), Canadian ice hockey goaltender
- Clare Adamson (born 1968), Member of Scottish Parliament
- Corey Adamson (born 1992), Australian sports figure
- Crawfurd Adamson (1953–2024), Scottish artist

== D ==
- Daniel Adamson (1820–1890), English engineer
- Dave Adamson (Australian footballer) (1874–1914), Australian rules footballer
- Dave Adamson (English footballer) (born 1951), English footballer
- David B. Adamson (1823–1891), farm implement manufacturer and inventor in Adelaide, South Australia
- David R. Adamson (1923–2011), Royal Canadian Air Force officer
- Derick Adamson (born 1958), Jamaican marathon runner
- Diquan Adamson (born 1994), Barbadian footballer
- Don A. Adamson (1931–2002), Australian biologist
- Donald Adamson (1939–2024), British author and historian

== E ==
- Edward Adamson (1911–1996), British artist and pioneer of Art Therapy
- Erich Carl Hugo Adamson (1902–1968) known as Adamson-Eric, Estonian artist
- Ewart Adamson (1882–1945), Scottish screenwriter

== F ==
- Frances Adamson (born 1961), Australian public servant, diplomat, 36th Governor of South Australia
- Frank Adamson (c.1809–1887), American state legislator
- Frederick Adamson (1816–1860), settler in Victoria, Australia

== G ==
- George Adamson (1906–1989), Indian-born wildlife conservationist and author
- George Lucas Adamson, founder of Adamson University
- George Worsley Adamson (1913–2005), American and British illustrator and author
- Gil Adamson (born 1961), Canadian writer
- Glenn Adamson (born 1972), American curator, author and historian
- Gordon Adamson (1904–1986), Canadian architect
- Grant Adamson, Australian rugby league player

== H ==
- Hans Christian Adamson (1890–1968), Danish-American writer
- Harold Adamson (1906–1980), American lyricist
- Harold Adamson (police officer) (1921–2001), Canadian police officer
- Harry Adamson (1912–1989), English footballer
- Harvey Adamson (1854–1941), Lieutenant Governor of Burma
- Hendrik Adamson (1891–1946), Estonian poet
- Henry Adamson, (1581–1637), Scottish poet and historian
- Horatio George Adamson (1865–1955), British dermatologist
- Hugh Adamson (1885–?), Scottish footballer who played for Bolton Wanderers and Everton

== I ==
- Ian Adamson (1944–2019), Irish politician and medical doctor
- Ian Adamson (adventure racer) (born 1964), American competitive adventure racer
- Ida Emilie Adamson (1898–1989), Estonian printmaker
- Isaac Adamson (born 1971), American author

== J ==
- Jack Adamson (1873–1937), Australian rules footballer
- Jack H. Adamson (1918–1975), American academic
- James B. Adamson, American businessman
- James Bradshaw Adamson (1921–2003), United States Army general
- James C. Adamson (born 1946), astronaut
- James Hazel Adamson (1829–1902), South Australian inventor and artist
- Jamie Adamson (born 1999), English rugby union player
- Janet Adamson (1882–1962), Scottish politician
- Jean Adamson (1928–2024), British children's writer and illustrator
- Jennie Adamson (1882–1962), British Labour Party politician
- Jessica Adamson (born 1971/2), Australian journalist and TV presenter
- Jim Adamson (1905–1991), Australian rules footballer
- Jimmy Adamson (1929–2011), English footballer and football manager
- Jimmy Adamson (Scottish footballer) (c. 1927–?), Scottish footballer
- Joe Adamson, author
- Joel Adamson (born 1971), American baseball pitcher
- John Adamson (antiquary) (1787–1855), English antiquary
- John Adamson (Queensland politician) (1857–1922), member of the Parliament of Queensland
- John Adamson (minister) (1742–1808), Moderator of the General Assembly of the Church of Scotland
- John Adamson (New South Wales politician) (1910–1984), member of the New South Wales Legislative Assembly
- John Adamson (physician) (1809–1870), Scottish doctor, physicist and museum curator
- John Adamson (publisher) (born 1949), British publisher
- John Adamson (university principal) (1576–1653), principal of the University of Edinburgh, 1623–1652
- John Ernest Adamson (1867–1950), English educationalist
- John Evans Adamson (1884–1961), Canadian lawyer and judge
- John William Adamson (1857–1949), British educationist
- Joni Adamson (born 1958), American literary and cultural theorist
- Joy Adamson (1910–1980), Czech-born British naturalist and author
- Julia Adamson (born 1960), Canadian-born British composer

== K ==
- Kealey Adamson (born 2003), Australian footballer
- Keith Adamson (born 1945), English footballer
- Ken Adamson (1938–2023), American footballer
- Kenny Adamson (born 1988), Scottish footballer

== L ==
- Lauren Adamson (1948–2021), American developmental psychologist
- Lawrence Adamson (1860–1932), Australian schoolmaster
- Lawrence William Adamson (1829–1911), Manx lawyer
- Lee Adamson (born 1946), Australian rules footballer
- Lesley Grant-Adamson (born 1942), British writer
- Lina Drechsler Adamson (1876–1960), Canadian violinist, conductor and music educator
- Luke Adamson (born 1987), English rugby league footballer

== M ==
- Maggie Adamson, Scottish musician
- Mandy Adamson (1972–2022), South African golfer
- Margaret Adamson, Australian diplomat
- Mart Adamson (1892–1975), Estonian politician
- Matt Adamson (born 1972), Australian rugby league player
- May Mabel Adamson (1891–1966), Australian educator
- Michael Adamson (born 1971), Canadian painter, photographer and curator
- Shpongle born Michele Adamson, rave and trance DJ
- Mike Adamson (baseball) (1947–2022), American baseball player
- Mike Adamson (footballer) (born 1949), Scottish footballer
- Mike Adamson (rugby union) (born 1984), Scottish rugby union player and referee

== N ==
- Nej Adamson (born 1958), British actor
- Nick Adamson (born 1969), Bahamian-born sailor
- Nicolas Clark Adamson (born 1938), courtier

== O ==
- Owe Adamson (1935–2023), Swedish cyclist

== P ==
- Patrick Adamson (1537–1592), Scottish prelate
- Paul Adamson, British editor
- Percy Adamson, American soccer player
- Peter Adamson (politician) (born 1961), Lord Mayor of Darwin
- Peter Adamson (actor) (1930–2002), British actor
- Peter Adamson (philosopher) (born 1972), professor of philosophy
- Phil Adamson (born 1970), Australian rugby league player

== R ==
- Raymond Adamson (1920–2002), British actor
- Rebecca Adamson (born 1950), American businessperson and advocate
- Rhoda Adamson (1893–1962), American dairy executive
- Robert Adamson (actor) (born 1985), American actor
- Robert Stephen Adamson (1885–1965), British botanist
- Robert Adamson (FDNY Commissioner) (1871–1935), American journalist and public official
- Robert Adamson (philosopher) (1852–1902), Scottish philosopher
- Robert Adamson (photographer) (1821–1848), Scottish chemist and pioneer in photography
- Robert Adamson (poet) (1943–2022), Australian poet
- Robert Adamson (software pioneer) (born 1947), American computer scientist
- Robert Adamson (MP) (1753–1817), member of Parliament for Cricklade in England
- Robert E. Adamson Jr. (1920–2004), American naval officer

== S ==
- Samuel Adamson (born 1969/1970), Australian playwright
- Sarah Gough Adamson (1888–1963), British artist
- Scott Adamson (1906–1962), Rhodesian cricketer
- Sofia Adamson (1916–2007), American museum founder
- Stephen Adamson, Irish lawn and indoor bowler
- Stuart Adamson (1958–2001), British rock musician

== T ==
- Terry Adamson (born 1948), English footballer
- Thomas Adamson (master gunner) (died 1685), English army officer and military writer
- Thomas Adamson (soldier) (1845–1913), New Zealand soldier and farmer
- Thomas Adamson (priest) (1901–1991), domestic prelate to the Pope and Vicar-General of Liverpool
- Thomas T Adamson-Coumbousis, journalist
- Tiahni Adamson, Australian wildlife conservation biologist
- Toby Adamson (born 1990), English rugby league footballer
- Tom Adamson (1897–1959), Scottish footballer who played for Brentford and Bury
- Tommy Adamson, Scottish footballer who played for Dundee United and Forfar Athletic
- Travers Adamson (1827–1897), Irish barrister and politician
- Trevor Adamson, Australian singer

== V ==
- Victor Adamson (1890–1972), New Zealand film director and actor

== W ==
- William Adamson (1863–1936), Scottish leader of the British Labour Party
- William Adamson (Wisconsin politician) (1834–1907), American politician
- William Adamson (Australian politician) (1858–1924), Australian politician
- William Adamson (businessman) (1832–1917), British businessman and member of the Legislative Council in Singapore
- William Agar Adamson (1800–1868), Canadian Anglican cleric and author
- William C. Adamson (1854–1929), American politician from Georgia
- William Adamson (Cannock MP) (1881–1945), British Labour politician

== Y ==
- Yilpi Adamson (born 1954), Australian artist
