= James Adamson =

James Adamson is the name of:

- James Adamson (actor) (1896–1956), American actor
- James C. Adamson (born 1946), NASA astronaut and retired US Army colonel
- James B. Adamson, business executive and former CEO of Burger King
- James Bradshaw Adamson (1921–2003), Major General in the US Army
- James Hazel Adamson (1829–1902), Australian artist and inventor
- Jim Adamson (1905–1991), Australian rules footballer
- Jimmy Adamson (1929–2011), English footballer
- Jimmy Adamson (Scottish footballer) (born c. 1927), Scottish professional footballer
