= Mike Adamson =

Mike Adamson may refer to:

- Mike Adamson (baseball) (1947–2022), American baseball player
- Mike Adamson (rugby union) (born 1984), Scottish rugby union player and referee
- Mike Adamson (footballer) (born 1949), Scottish footballer

== See also ==
- Michael Adamson (born 1971), Canadian painter
