= David Adamson =

David or Dave Adamson may refer to:

- David B. Adamson (1823–1891), farm implement manufacturer and inventor in Adelaide, South Australia
- David R. Adamson (1923–2011), Royal Canadian Air Force officer
- Dave Adamson (Australian footballer) (1874–1914), Australian rules footballer
- Dave Adamson (English footballer) (born 1951), English footballer
