= Peter Adamson =

Peter Adamson may refer to:

- Peter Adamson (actor) (1930–2002), British stage and television actor best known for playing the character of Len Fairclough in Coronation Street
- Peter Adamson (politician) (born 1961), Australian politician
- Peter Adamson (philosopher) (born 1972), American professor of philosophy

== See also ==
- Adamson (surname)
