= Frank Adamson =

South Carolina reconstruction era American politician

South Carolina House of Representatives
- In office 1870–1874

Personal details
- Born: c. 1809 South Carolina
- Died: 1887 (aged 77–78)
- Party: Republican

Frank Adamson (c. 1809–1887) was a state legislator who served in the South Carolina House of Representatives during the Reconstruction era, from 1870 to 1874.

Adamson was born in about 1809 in South Carolina as a slave and was a tailor by trade.

He was nominated as a delegate to the Columbia Convention in the spring of 1970 along with eleven white and five other black delegates. The 1870 United States census showed that he real-estate to the value of $1500.

He was then selected as one of the house nominations by the Scott Ring in August 1870. He was then elected to serve the county along with Reuben Gaither and Stephen Gary, serving as a Republican in the 1870-1872 session.

Adamson and Gaither were again selected, along with Allison W. Hough, as the Republican nominations for the next session. All three were then duly elected in October 1872 to serve for the 1873-1874 session.

He spoke in favour of Temperance and had declared that his long and healthy life was due to never having drunk whiskey or any other "intoxicating liquors" as well as never taking a dose of medicine.

He continued to be involved with politics such as presiding over the Camden convention in October 1878.

His father William Adamson also served in the South Carolina's legislature.

== See also ==
- African American officeholders from the end of the Civil War until before 1900
