= Thomas Adamson =

Thomas Adamson may refer to:

- Thomas Adamson (master gunner) (died 1685), English Army officer and military writer
- Thomas Adamson (soldier) (1845–1913), New Zealand soldier and farmer
- Thomas Adamson (priest) (1901–1991), domestic prelate to the Pope and Vicar-General of Liverpool
- Tom Adamson (1901–?), footballer
- Tommy Adamson, Scottish footballer
