= List of Philadelphia Phillies first-round draft picks =

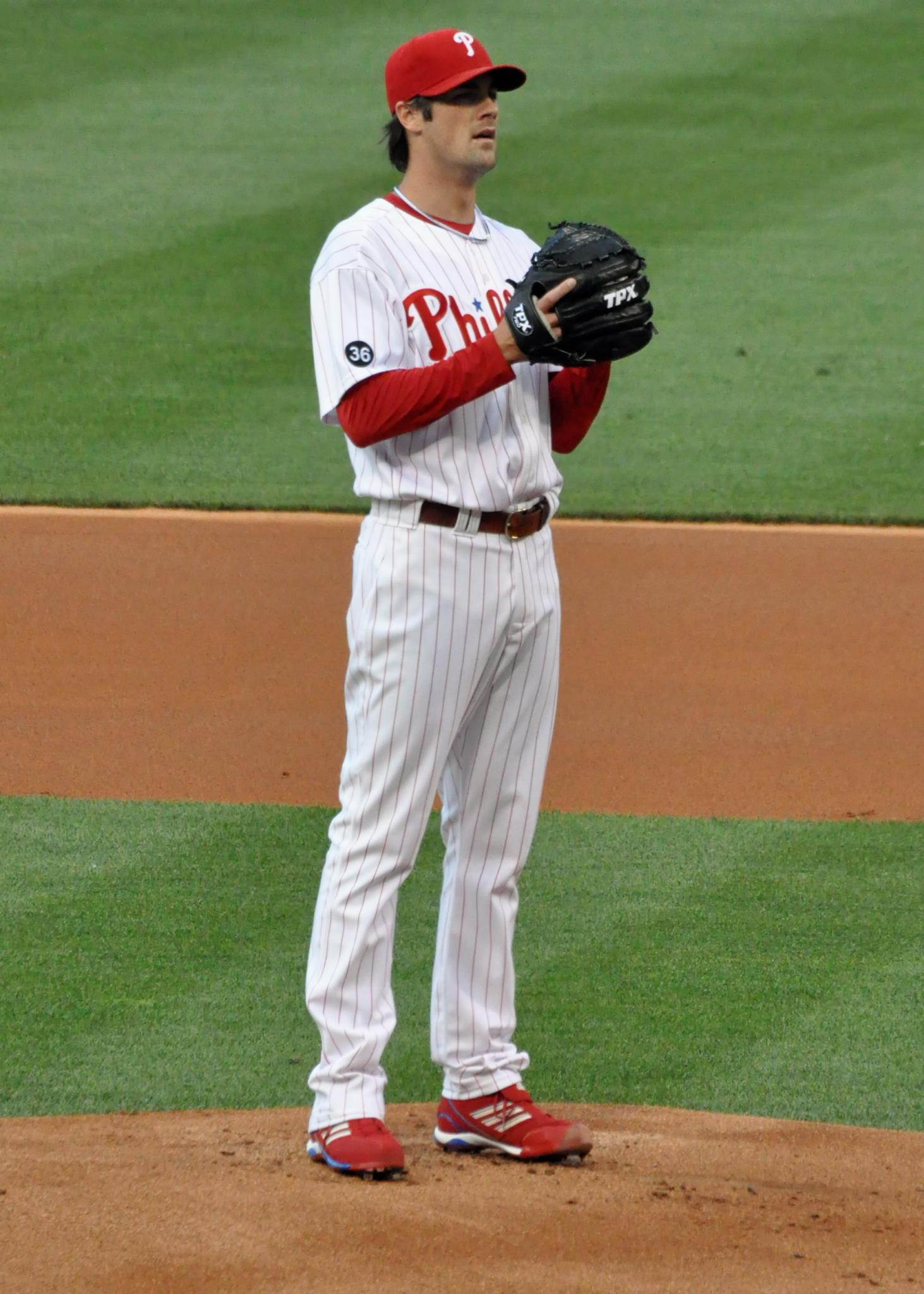
Cole Hamels, the Phillies' first-round pick in 2002

The Philadelphia Phillies are a Major League Baseball franchise based in Philadelphia, Pennsylvania. They play in the National League East division. Since the institution of Major League Baseball's Rule 4 Draft, the Phillies have selected 51 players in its first round. Officially known as the "First-Year Player Draft", the Rule 4 Draft is Major League Baseball's primary mechanism for assigning amateur baseball players from high schools, colleges, and other amateur baseball clubs to its teams. The draft order is determined based on the previous season's standings, with the team possessing the worst record receiving the first pick. In addition, teams which lost free agents in the previous off-season may be awarded compensatory or supplementary picks.

Of the 51 players picked in the first round by the Phillies, 26 have been pitchers, the most of any position; 20 of these were right-handed, while 6 were left-handed. Nine players picked in the initial round were outfielders, while six catchers, four first basemen, and four shortstops were selected. The team also selected one player each at second base and third base. Thirteen of the 45 players came from high schools or universities in the state of California, while Texas and Florida follow, with six and five players, respectively.

Eight Phillies first-round picks have won a championship with the franchise. Greg Luzinski (1968), Larry Christenson (1972), and Lonnie Smith (1974) were on the roster when the team won the 1980 World Series. Third baseman (later left fielder) Pat Burrell (1998), pitchers Adam Eaton (1996), Brett Myers (1999) and Cole Hamels (2002), and second baseman Chase Utley (2000) were all members of the team during the Phillies' 2008 World Series championship.

The Phillies have had five compensatory and seven supplementary picks since the institution of the First-Year Player Draft in 1965. These additional picks are provided when a team loses a particularly valuable free agent in the prior off-season, or, more recently, if a team fails to sign a draft pick from the previous year. The Phillies have failed to sign their first-round pick twice. The first occurrence was in 1965 (Mike Adamson); however, compensatory picks were not awarded at that time. The second occurrence was in 1997, when outfielder J. D. Drew, at the advice of agent Scott Boras, refused to sign a contract worth less than $10 million. Drew sat out of affiliated baseball in 1997, playing instead for the independent St. Paul Saints of the Northern League, and re-entered the 1998 Draft the following year. The Phillies were awarded an additional pick in that draft, with which they selected outfielder Eric Valent.

== Key ==
Year	Each year links to an article about that year's Major League Baseball draft.
Position	Indicates the secondary/collegiate position at which the player was drafted, rather than the professional position the player may have gone on to play
Pick	Indicates the number of the pick within the first round
*	Player did not sign with the Phillies
§	Indicates a supplemental pick
'80	Player was a member of Phillies' 1980 championship team
'08	Player was a member of Phillies' 2008 championship team

== Picks ==
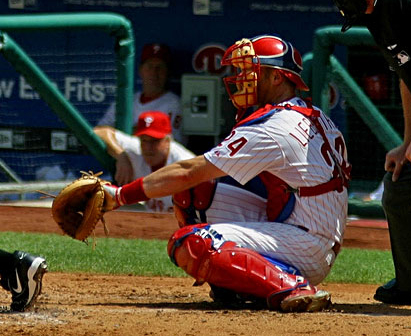
Mike Lieberthal (1990)

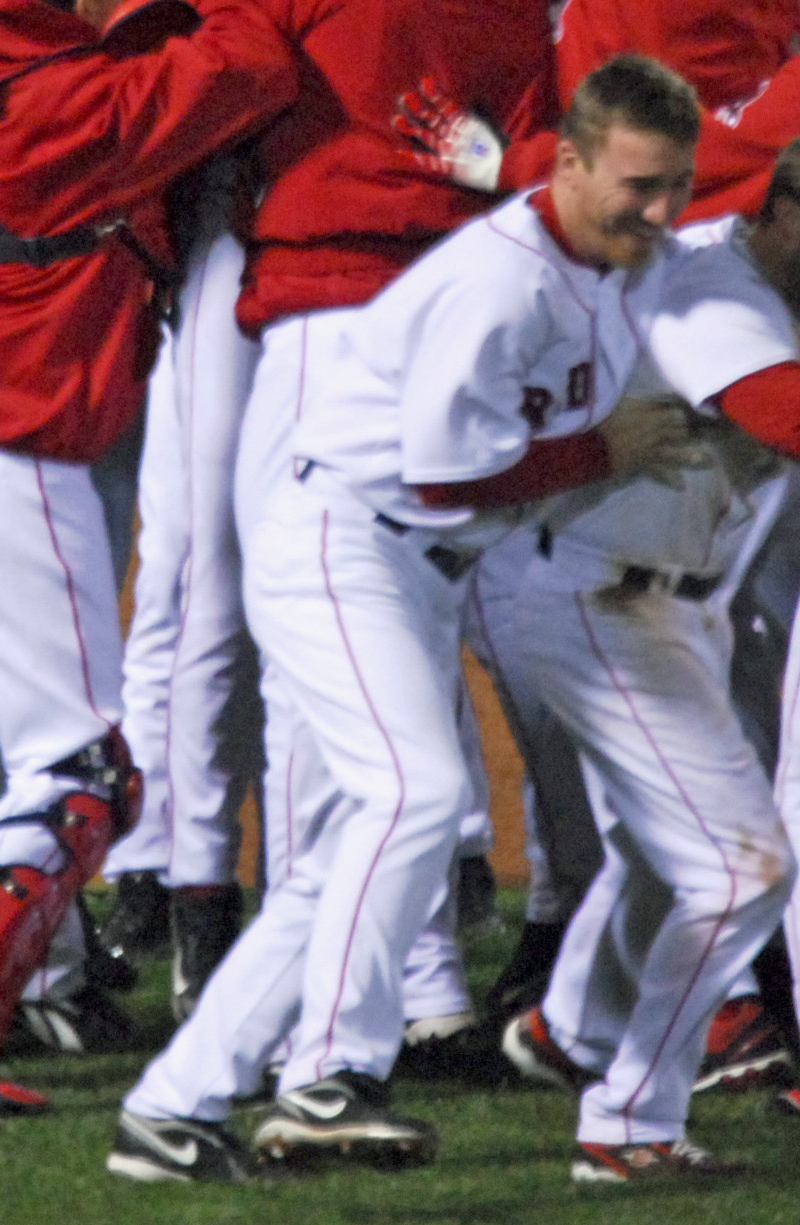
J. D. Drew (1997)

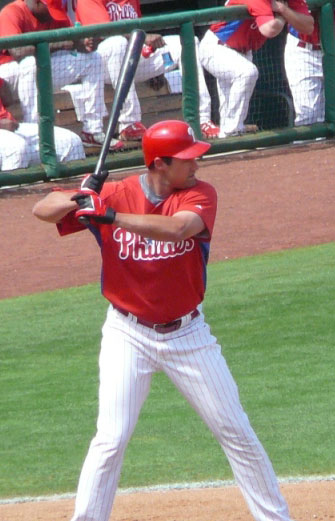
Pat Burrell (1998)

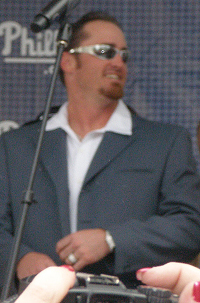
Brett Myers (1999)

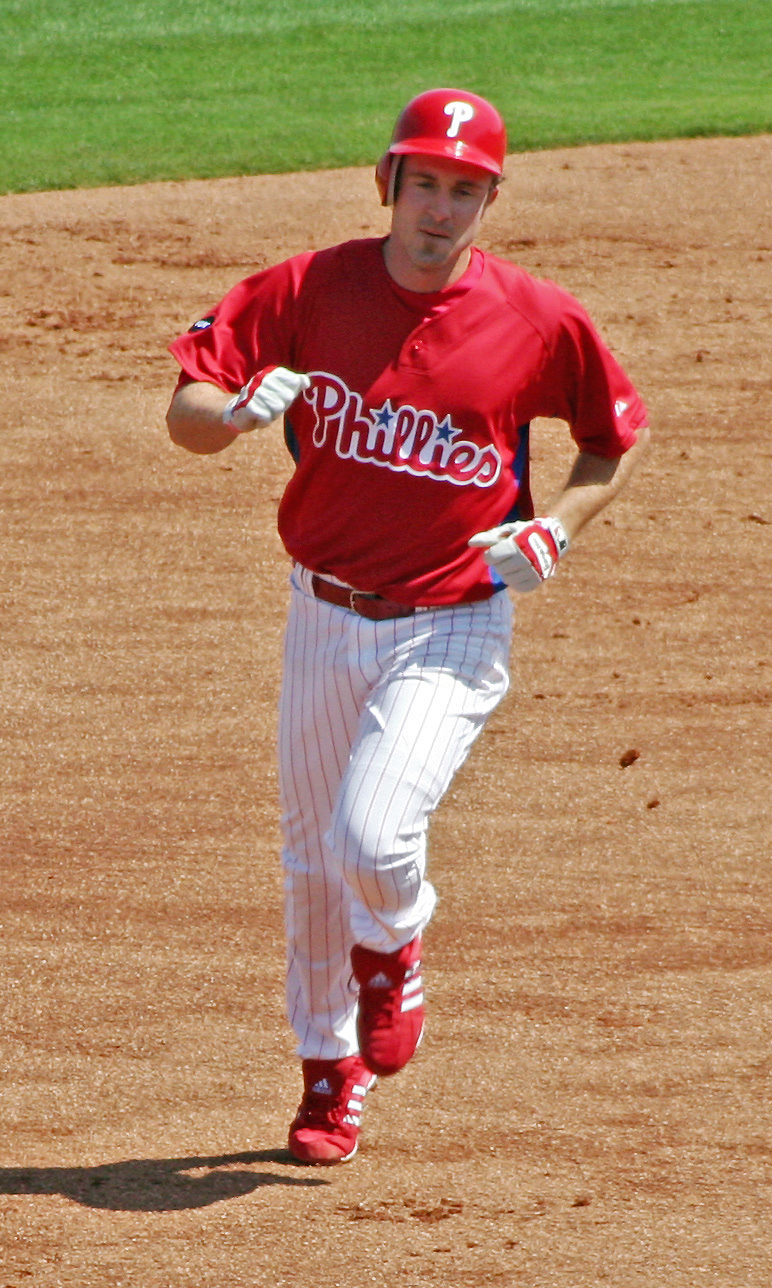
Chase Utley (2000)

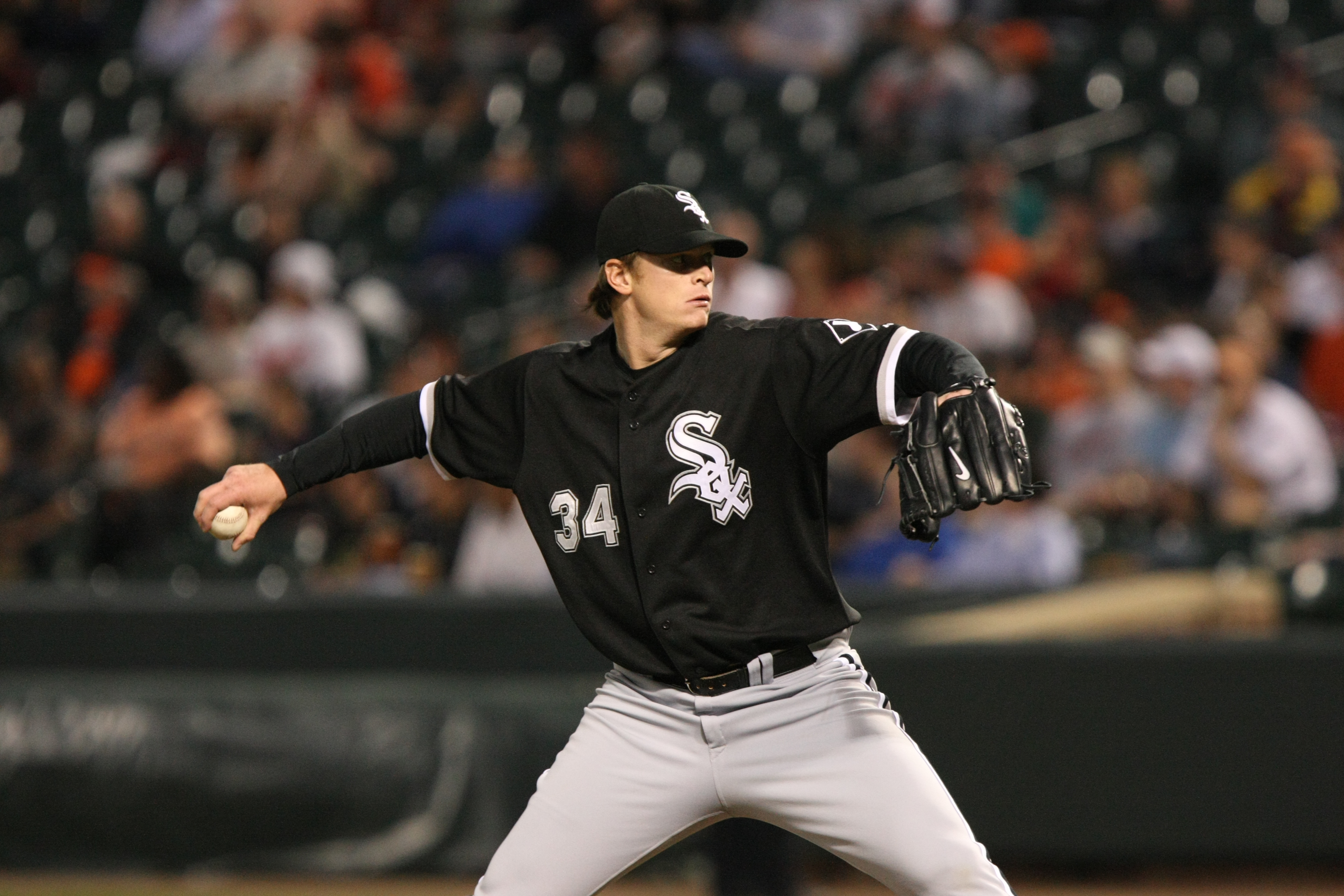
Gavin Floyd (2001)

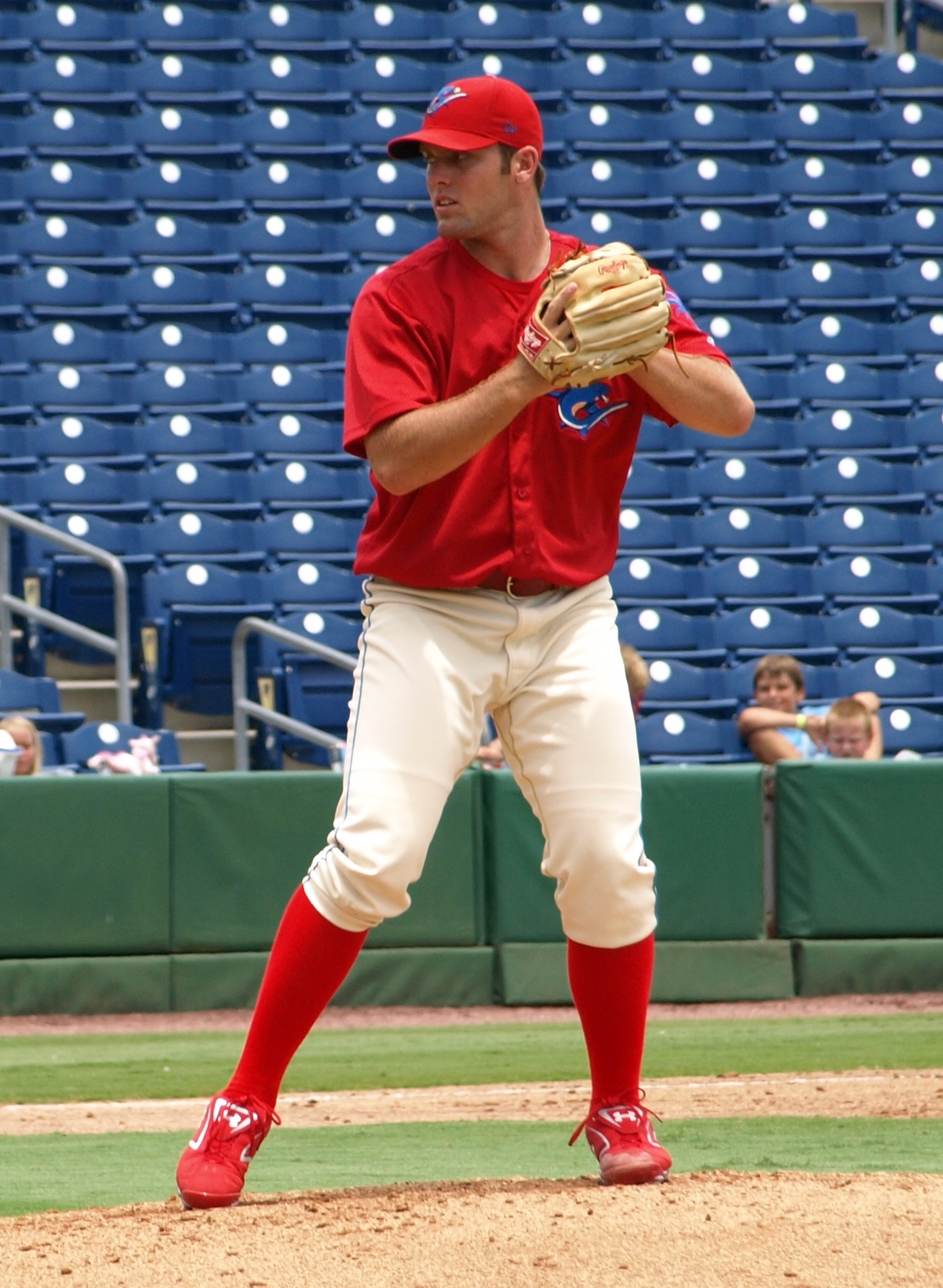
Joe Savery (2007)

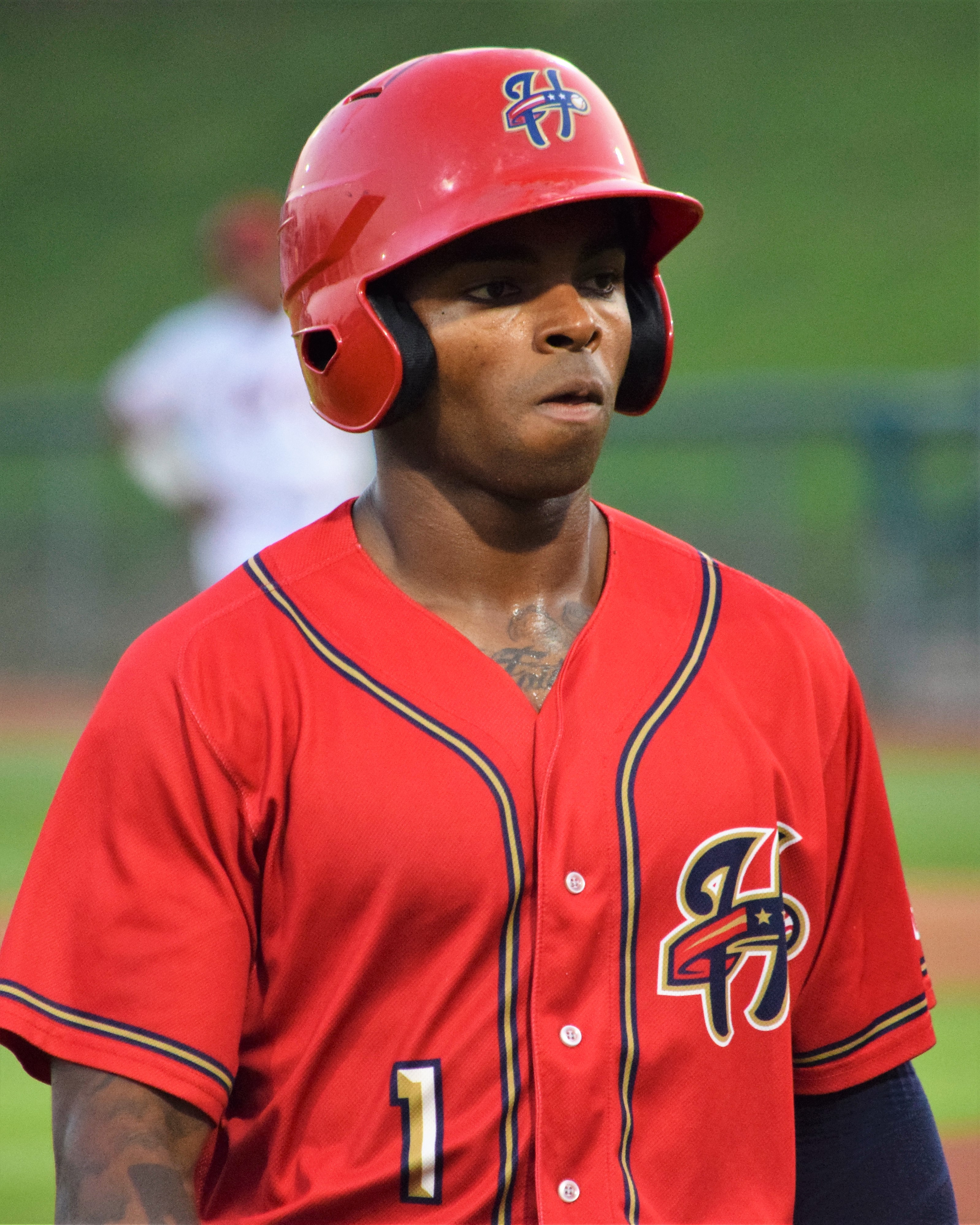
Zach Collier (2008)

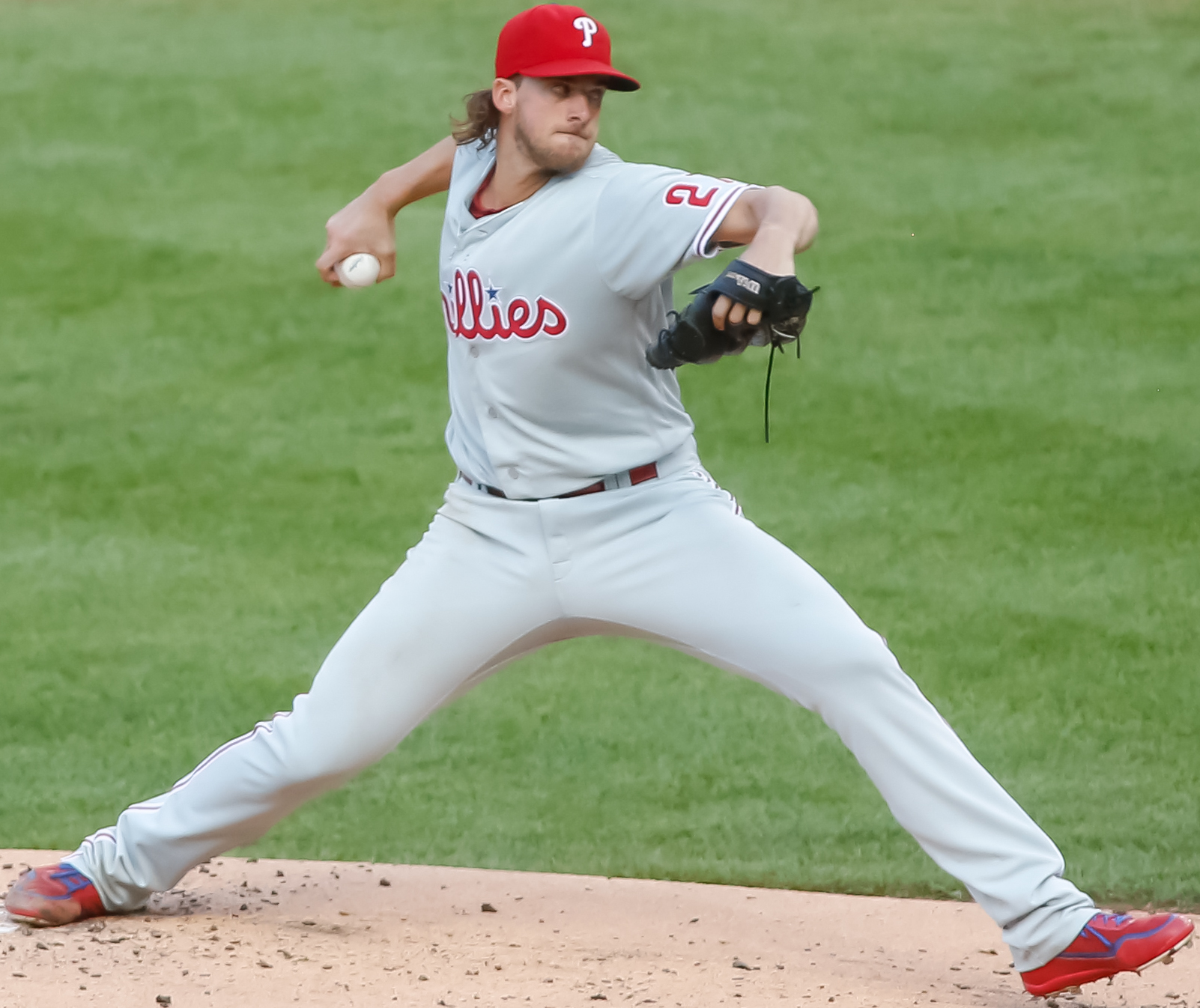
Aaron Nola (2014)

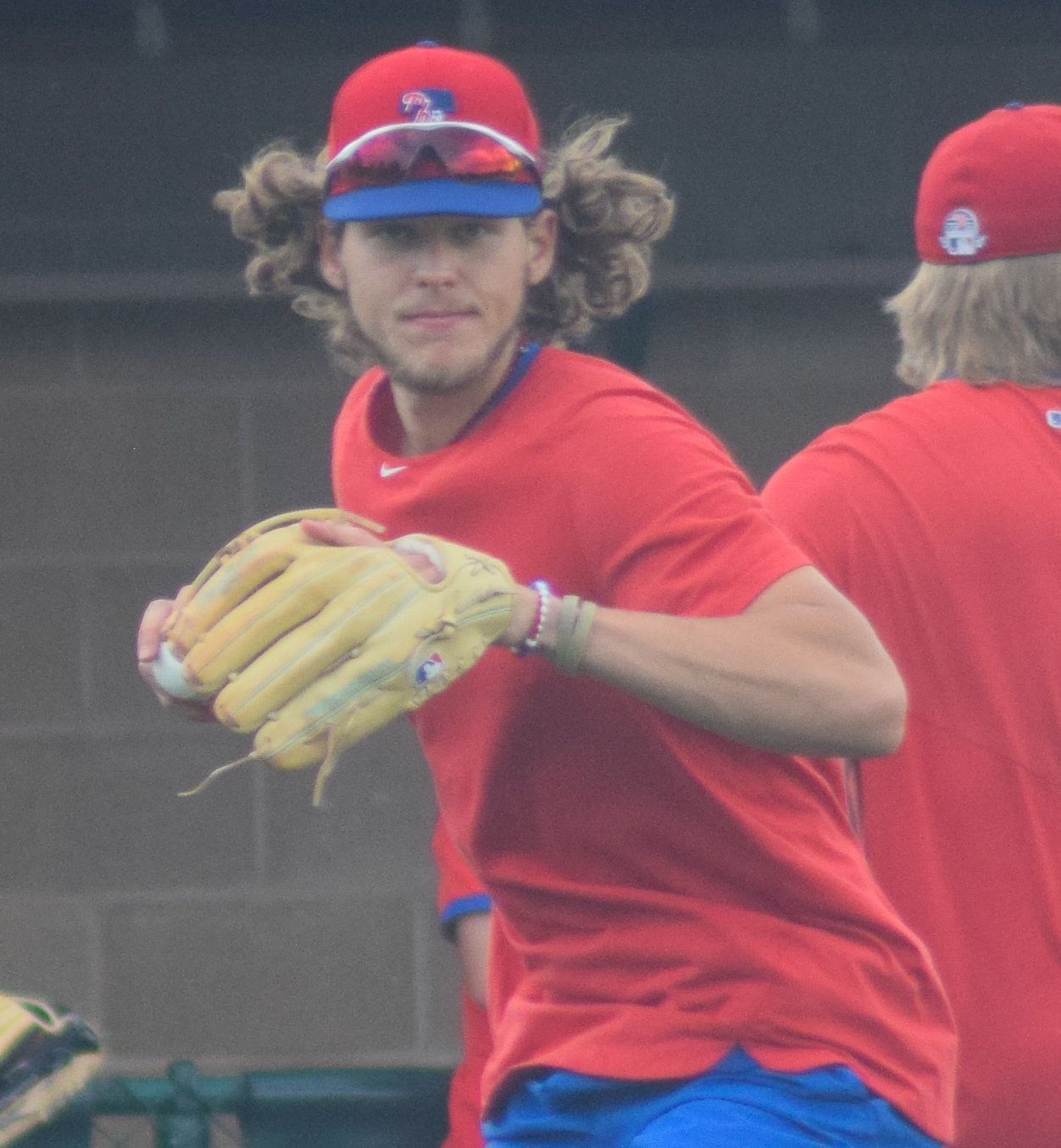
Alec Bohm (2018)

Year	Name	Position	School (Location)	Pick
1965	Mike Adamson*	Right-handed pitcher	Point Loma High School (San Diego, California)	18
1966	Michael Biko	Right-handed pitcher	W. W. Samuel High School (Dallas, Texas)	9
1967	Phil Meyer	Left-handed pitcher	Pius X High School (Downey, California)	14
1968	Greg Luzinski '80	First baseman	Notre Dame High School (Prospect Heights, Illinois)	11
1969	Mike Anderson	First baseman	Timmonsville High School (Timmonsville, South Carolina)	6
1970	Mike Martin	Left-handed pitcher	Olympia High School (Columbia, South Carolina)	5
1971	Roy Thomas	Right-handed pitcher	Lompoc High School (Lompoc, California)	6
1972	Larry Christenson '80	Right-handed pitcher	Marysville High School (Stanwood, Washington)	3
1973	John Stearns	Catcher	University of Colorado Boulder (Boulder, Colorado)	2
1974	Lonnie Smith '80	Outfielder	Centennial High School (Compton, California)	3
1975	Sam Welborn	Right-handed pitcher	Wichita Falls High School (Wichita Falls, Texas)	12
1976	Jeff Kraus	Shortstop	Colerain High School (Cincinnati, Ohio)	17
1977	Scott Munninghoff	Right-handed pitcher	Purcell High School (Cincinnati, Ohio)	22
1978	Rip Rollins	First baseman	Allegheny High School (Spark, North Carolina)	23
1979	no first-round pick (Note: The Phillies lost their first-round pick in 1979 to the Cincinnati Reds as compensation for signing free agent Pete Rose.)			
1980	Henry Powell	Catcher	Pine Forest High School (Pensacola, Florida)	13
1981	Johnny Abrego	Right-handed pitcher	Mission High School (San Jose, California)	20
1982	John Russell	Catcher	University of Oklahoma (Norman, Oklahoma)	13
1983	Ricky Jordan	First baseman	Grant High School (Sacramento, California)	22
1984	Pete Smith	Right-handed pitcher	Burlington High School (Burlington, Massachusetts)	21
1985	Trey McCall	Catcher	Abingdon High School (Abingdon, Virginia)	16
1986	Brad Brink	Right-handed pitcher	University of Southern California (Los Angeles, California)	7
1987	no first-round pick (Note: The Phillies lost their first-round pick in 1987 to the Detroit Tigers as compensation for signing free agent Lance Parrish.)			
1988	Pat Combs	Left-handed pitcher	Baylor University (Waco, Texas)	11
1989	Jeff Jackson	Outfielder	Simeon High School (Chicago, Illinois)	4
1990	Mike Lieberthal	Catcher	Westlake High School (Westlake Village, California)	3
1991	Tyler Green	Right-handed pitcher	Wichita State University (Wichita, Kansas)	10
1992	Chad McConnell	Outfielder	Creighton University (Omaha, Nebraska)	13
1993	Wayne Gomes	Right-handed pitcher	Old Dominion University (Norfolk, Virginia)	4
1994	Carlton Loewer	Right-handed pitcher	Mississippi State University (Mississippi State, Mississippi)	23
1995	Reggie Taylor	Outfielder	Newberry High School (Newberry, South Carolina)	14
1995	Dave Coggin	Right-handed pitcher	Upland High School (Upland, California)	30^{§} (Note: The Phillies gained a supplemental first-round pick in 1995 as compensation for losing free agent Danny Jackson.)
1996	Adam Eaton '08	Right-handed pitcher	Snohomish High School (Snohomish, Washington)	11
1997	J. D. Drew*	Outfielder	Florida State University (Tallahassee, Florida)	2
1998	Pat Burrell '08	Third baseman	University of Miami (Coral Gables, Florida)	1
1998	Eric Valent	Outfielder	University of California, Los Angeles (Los Angeles, California)	42^{§} (Note: The Phillies gained a supplemental first-round pick in 1998 as compensation for failing to sign 1997 first-round pick J. D. Drew.)
1999	Brett Myers '08	Right-handed pitcher	Englewood High School (Jacksonville, Florida)	12
2000	Chase Utley '08	Second baseman	University of California, Los Angeles (Los Angeles, California)	15
2001	Gavin Floyd	Right-handed pitcher	Mt. St. Joseph High School (Severna Park, Maryland)	4
2002	Cole Hamels '08	Left-handed pitcher	Rancho Bernardo High School (San Diego, California)	17
2003	no first-round pick (Note: The Phillies lost their first-round pick in 2003 to the Cleveland Indians as compensation for signing free agent Jim Thome.)			
2004	Greg Golson	Outfielder	Connally High School (Pflugerville, Texas)	21
2005	no first-round pick (Note: The Phillies lost their first-round pick in 2005 to the New York Yankees as compensation for signing free agent Jon Lieber.)			
2006	Kyle Drabek	Right-handed pitcher	The Woodlands High School (Montgomery County, Texas)	18
2006	Adrian Cardenas	Shortstop	Monsignor Edward Pace High School (Miami Gardens, Florida)	37^{§} (Note: The Phillies gained a supplemental first-round pick in 2006 as compensation for losing free agent Billy Wagner.)
2007	Joe Savery	Left-handed pitcher	Rice University (Houston, Texas)	19
2007	Travis d'Arnaud	Catcher	Lakewood High School (Lakewood, California)	37^{§} (Note: The Phillies gained a supplemental first-round pick in 2007 as compensation for losing free agent David Dellucci.)
2008	Anthony Hewitt	Shortstop	Salisbury School (Salisbury, Connecticut)	24
2008	Zach Collier	Outfielder	Chino Hills High School (Chino Hills, California)	34^{§} (Note: The Phillies gained a supplemental first-round pick in 2008 as compensation for losing free agent Aaron Rowand.)
2009	no first-round pick (Note: The Phillies lost their first-round pick in 2009 to the Seattle Mariners as compensation for signing free agent Raúl Ibañez.)			
2010	Jesse Biddle	Left-handed pitcher	Germantown Friends School (Philadelphia, Pennsylvania)	27
2011	Larry Greene	Outfielder	Berrien High School (Nashville, Georgia)	39^{§} (Note: The Phillies gained a supplemental first-round pick in 2011 as compensation for losing free agent Jayson Werth.)
2012	Shane Watson	Right-handed pitcher	Lakewood High School (Lakewood, California)	40^{§} (Note: The Phillies gained a supplemental first-round pick in 2012 as compensation for losing free agent Ryan Madson.)
2012	Mitch Gueller	Right-handed pitcher	W. F. West High School (Chehalis, Washington)	54^{§} (Note: The Phillies gained a supplemental first-round pick in 2012 as compensation for losing free agent Raul Ibanez.)
2013	J. P. Crawford	Shortstop	Lakewood High School (Lakewood, California)	16
2014	Aaron Nola	Right-handed pitcher	Louisiana State University (Baton Rouge, Louisiana)	7
2015	Cornelius Randolph	Shortstop	Griffin High School (Griffin, Georgia)	10
2016	Mickey Moniak	Outfielder	La Costa Canyon High School (San Diego, California)	1
2017	Adam Haseley	Outfielder	University of Virginia (Charlottesville, Virginia)	8
2018	Alec Bohm	Third baseman	Wichita State University (Wichita, Kansas)	3
2019	Bryson Stott	Shortstop	University of Nevada, Las Vegas (Paradise, Nevada)	14
2020	Mick Abel	Right-handed pitcher	Jesuit High School (Beaverton, Oregon)	15
2021	Andrew Painter	Right-handed pitcher	Calvary Christian Academy (Fort Lauderdale, Florida)	13
2022	Justin Crawford	Outfielder	Bishop Gorman High School (Las Vegas, Nevada)	17
2023	Aidan Miller	Third baseman	J. W. Mitchell High School (Trinity, Florida)	27
2024	Dante Nori	Shortstop	Northville High School (Northville, Michigan)	27
2025	Gage Wood	Right-Handed Pitcher	University of Arkansas (Fayetteville, Arkansas)	26
2026	Tyler Spangler	Shortstop	De La Salle High School (Concord, California)	36^{§}

== See also ==
- Philadelphia Phillies minor league players
