= The Raphaels =

Alternative country music band

- Origin: Nashville, Tennessee, U.S.
- Genres: Country; alternative country
- Years active: 1999–2001
- Label: Track
- Spinoff of: Big Country
- Members: Stuart Adamson; Marcus Hummon
- Website: Official site

The Raphaels were an alternative country music band, fronted by Scottish guitarist Stuart Adamson, formerly of Skids and Big Country. The duo also featured Nashville songwriter Marcus Hummon. The duo only toured briefly, playing various dates around the Nashville area as well as four shows in May 2001. The group was scheduled to play five shows but Adamson did not show up for the band's fifth show scheduled on May 19, 2001. The duo's gig on May 18, 2001, ended up being the last concert Adamson would perform in his lifetime. Their debut and only studio album, Supernatural, was released on May 21, 2001, via Track Records in the United Kingdom and in the United States via the Western Beat Entertainment label. In December 2001, Adamson was found dead at the age of 43 in Honolulu, Hawaii, after hanging himself.

== Discography ==
=== Studio albums ===
Year	Album details
2001	Supernatural: Released: May 21, 2001; Label: Track Records
