= Amelia Lake (academic) =

British dietitian

Amelia A. Lake
- Education: Glasgow Caledonian University; Newcastle University
- Scientific career
- Workplaces: Teesside University; Durham University; Northumbria University

Amelia A. Lake is a British dietitian who is Professor of Biosciences at Teesside University. She works in public health, and is co-founder of the North East Obesogenic Environment Network (NEOeN). She is concerned about the impact of energy drinks on children's health.

== Early life and education ==
Lake studied public health at Glasgow Caledonian University, and graduated with first-class honours in 1999. She worked briefly for the National Health Service, before beginning her postgraduate career at Newcastle University. She was awarded the British Dietetic Association Elizabeth Washington Award. earned her PhD in 2004. She was made an National Institute for Health Research Fellow at Newcastle University working on obesogen. She found that co-habiting with a boyfriend risks making women fatter. She argued that people in relationships change their diets to try and please each other. She also showed that people's diets became more healthy with age.

== Research and career ==
Lake works on the obesogenic environment, which describes the possible ways our environment influences people's likelihood of obesity. She joined Northumbria University as an associate professor in 2010, before moving to Durham University in 2011. Lake believes that obesity is a global concern. She has investigated how to address obesity through spatial planning; including planning policy, development control and redesigning the built environment. She believes that urban designers have as much of a responsibility in managing obesity as nutritionists.

In 2017 Lake joined Teesside University as a Reader in Public Health, and Associate Director of the Centre for Translational Research in Public Health (FUSE). She has argued for a sugary drink tax or ban on the sale of energy drinks to limit children's consumption of drinks and subsequent risk of obesity. As obesity and weight gain can cause certain cancers, Lake believes reducing the amount of sugar in our diet is essential for public health.

=== Academic service ===
Lake i has been a scientific advisor for the British Nutrition Foundation, a member of the Food Standards Agency Register of Specialists and of the British Dietetic Association Research Committee. She serves on the editorial board of BMC Public Health as well the British Nutrition Foundation's bulletin. She serves on the committee of the Association for the Study of Obesity.

=== Selected publications ===
Her publications include;

- Lake, Amelia A. (2011). Obesogenic Environments: Complexities, Perceptions and Objective Measures. John Wiley & Sons. ISBN 9781444347821.
- Lake, Amelia A. (2006-11-01). "Obesogenic environments: exploring the built and food environments". Journal of the Royal Society for the Promotion of Health. 126 (6): 262–267. doi:10.1177/1466424006070487. PMID 17152319. S2CID 1598671.
- Craigie, Angela M.; Lake, Amelia A.; Kelly, Sarah A.; Adamson, Ashley J.; Mathers, John C. (2011). "Tracking of obesity-related behaviours from childhood to adulthood: A systematic review" (PDF). Maturitas. 70 (3): 266–284. doi:10.1016/j.maturitas.2011.08.005. PMID 21920682. S2CID 25111007.
- Lake, Amelia (2006). "Longitudinal change in food habits between adolescence (11–12 years) and adulthood (32–33 years): the ASH30 Study". Journal of Public Health. 28: 10–6. doi:10.1093/pubmed/fdi082. PMID 16473923.
