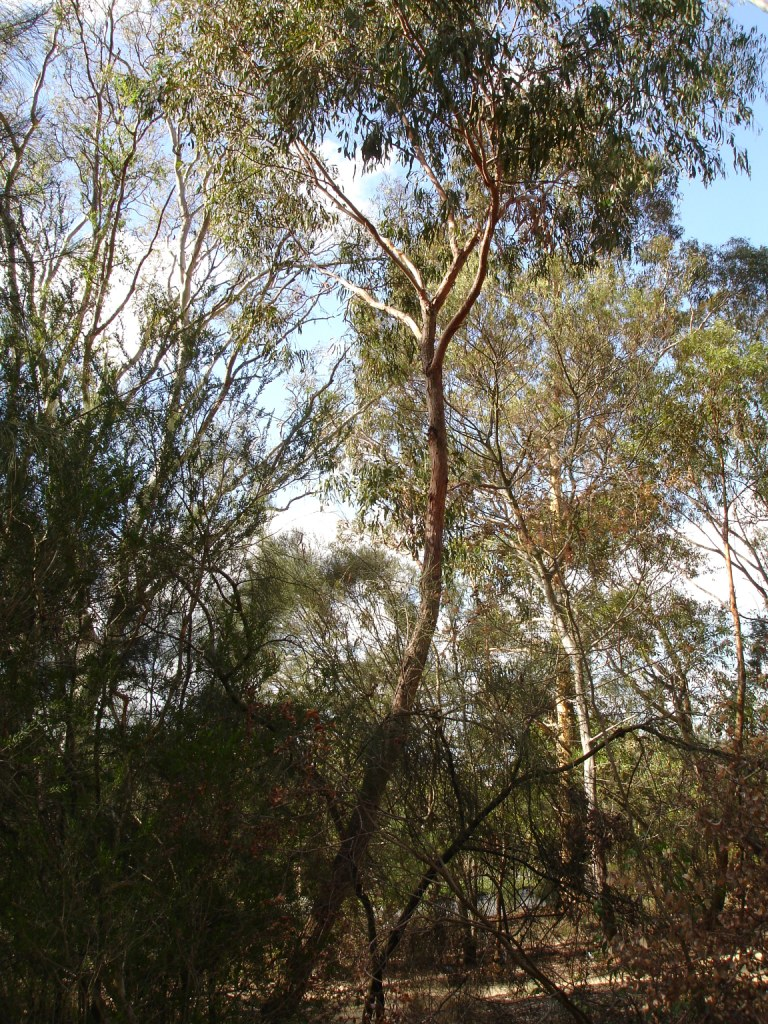
- Eucalyptus macrorhyncha in Maranoa Gardens

Conservation status
- Least Concern (IUCN 3.1)

Scientific classification
- Kingdom: Plantae
- Clade: Embryophytes
- Clade: Tracheophytes
- Clade: Spermatophytes
- Clade: Angiosperms
- Clade: Eudicots
- Clade: Rosids
- Order: Myrtales
- Family: Myrtaceae
- Genus: Eucalyptus
- Species: E. macrorhyncha

Binomial name
- Eucalyptus macrorhyncha F.Muell. ex Benth.
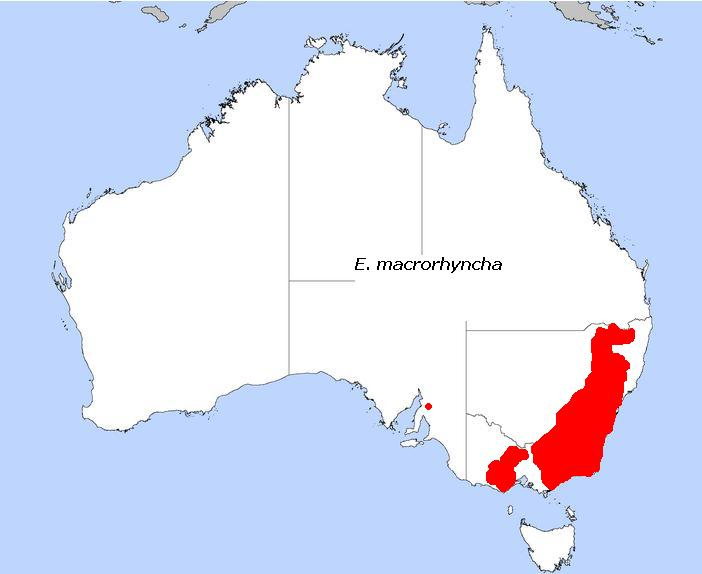
- E. macrorhyncha, field distribution

= Eucalyptus macrorhyncha =

Red stringybark

Species of eucalyptus

Eucalyptus macrorhyncha, commonly known as the red stringybark, is a species of medium-sized tree that is endemic to eastern Australia. It has rough, stringy, grey to brown bark, lance-shaped adult leaves, flower buds in groups of between seven and eleven, white flowers and hemispherical fruit.

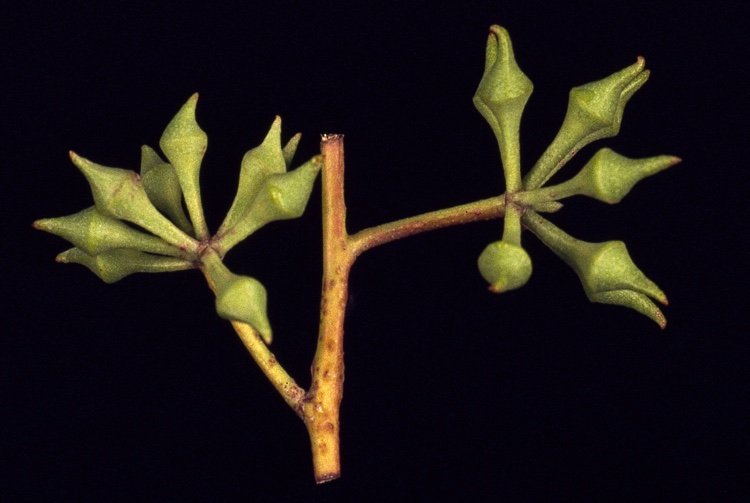
Flower buds

== Description ==
Eucalyptus macrorhyncha is a tree that typically grows to a height of 12–35 m (39–115 ft) and forms a lignotuber. It has rough, stringy, grey to reddish brown bark on the trunk and branches. Young plants and coppice regrowth have egg-shaped leaves 25–105 mm (0.98–4.13 in) long and 20–52 mm (0.79–2.05 in) wide. Adult leaves are lance-shaped to curved, the same dull to glossy green colour on both sides, 75–140 mm (3.0–5.5 in) long and 12–38 mm (0.47–1.50 in) wide on a petiole 7–20 mm (0.28–0.79 in) long. The flower buds are arranged in groups of seven, nine or eleven in leaf axils on an unbranched peduncle 7–18 mm (0.28–0.71 in) long, the individual buds on pedicels 4–6 mm (0.16–0.24 in) long. Mature buds are diamond-shaped, 5–9 mm (0.20–0.35 in) long and 4–5 mm (0.16–0.20 in) wide with a beaked operculum. Flowering occurs between February and July and the flowers are white. The fruit is a woody hemispherical or shortened spherical capsule 3–7 mm (0.12–0.28 in) long and 6–12 mm (0.24–0.47 in) wide with the valves protruding above the rim of the fruit.

Near Bundarra and Barraba, this species is difficult to distinguish from E. laevopinea.

== Taxonomy and naming ==
Eucalyptus macrorhyncha was first formally described in 1867 by George Bentham based on specimens collected by Frederick Adamson and by Ferdinand von Mueller who gave the species its name and wrote an unpublished description. The formal description was published in Flora Australiensis.

In 1973, Lawrie Johnson and Donald Blaxell changed the name of Eucalyptus cannonii to E. macrorhyncha subsp. cannonii and the names of the two subspecies are accepted by the Australian Plant Census:

- Eucalyptus macrorhyncha subsp. cannonii (R.T.Baker) L.A.S.Johnson & Blaxell has larger buds and wider fruit with more protruding valves than subspecies macrorhyncha;
- Eucalyptus macrorhyncha F.Muell. ex Benth. subsp. macrorhyncha.

The Wiradjuri people of New South Wales use the name gundhay for the species.

== Distribution and habitat ==
Red stringybark occurs on ranges and tablelands of New South Wales, the Australian Capital Territory and Victoria, with a small, disjunct population in the Spring Gully Conservation Park south-west of Clare in South Australia.

== Conservation status ==
E. macrorhyncha is listed as a least concern species with the International Union for the Conservation of Nature as it is spread over a broad geographic range and has an estimated extent of occurrence of 702,982 km^{2} (271,423 sq mi) and an estimated area of occupancy of 2,228 km^{2} (860 sq mi). Although it is also noted that it has a severely fragmented population that is in decline.

== Gallery ==
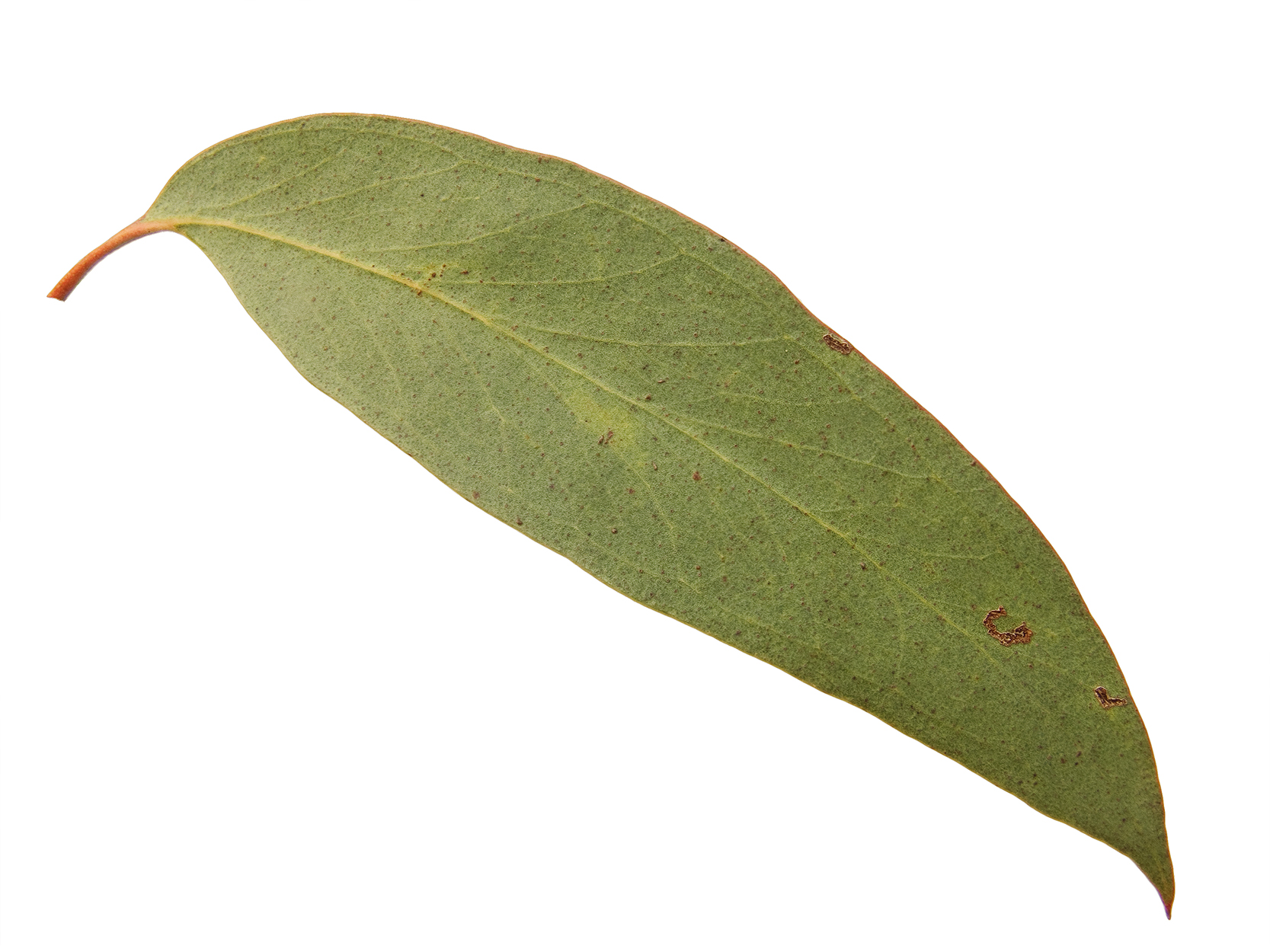
Leaf

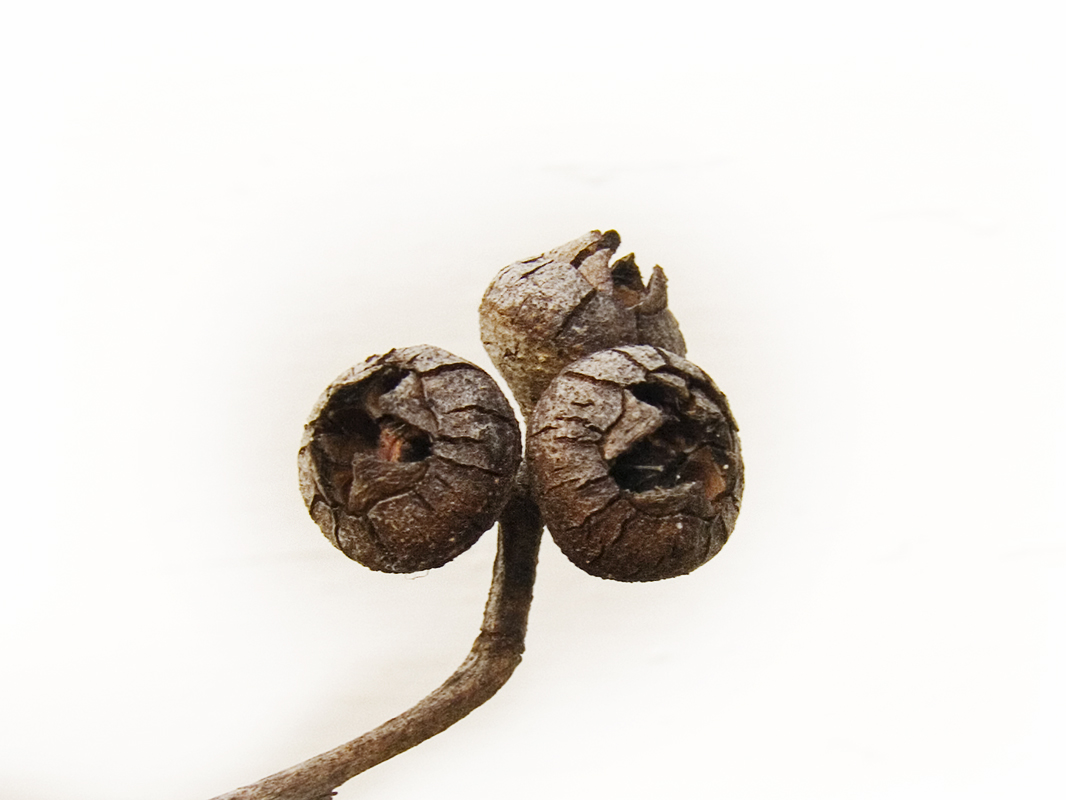
Fruit

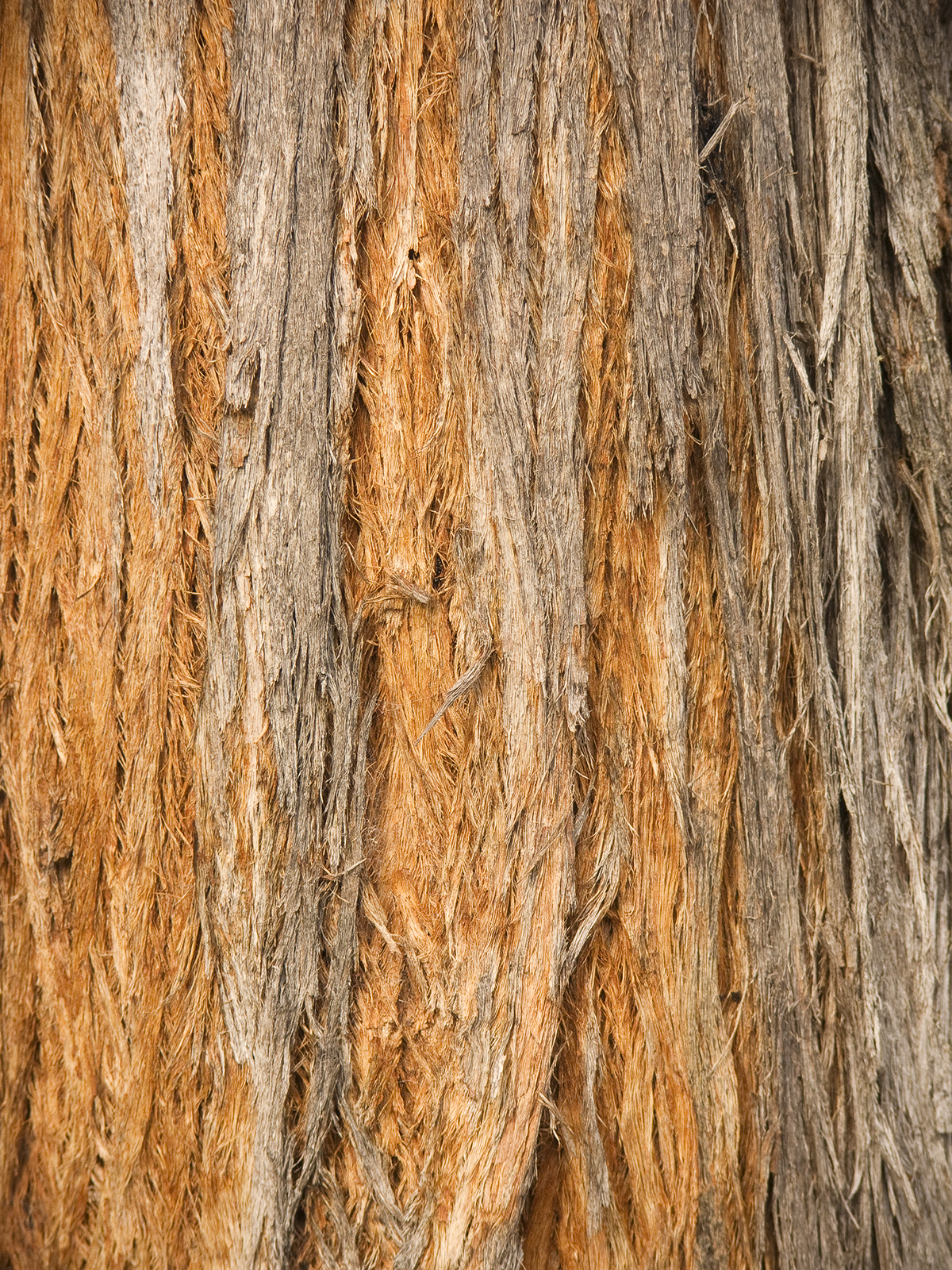
Bark
