= Robert Adamson (software developer) =

American software pioneer and author (born 1947)

Robert G. Adamson III (born October 19, 1947, in Salt Lake City, Utah) is an American software pioneer and author. He is married with six children and 13 grandchildren.

Adamson graduated in computer science from the University of Utah in 1971. In 1981, he founded Software Generation Technology Corp. and wrote, one of the first fully interpretive languages for IBM mainframe computers. SGT was sold to Pansophic Systems where the product was renamed GENER/OL. and later acquired by Computer Associates

Later he founded Nostradamus Inc. and wrote Instant Replay, Copyright 1993 one of the first multimedia tools for personal computers. Instant Replay combined software demos with photos and audio for distribution on floppy diskettes. Instant Replay was used by thousands of large companies such as Intel, Microsoft and Novel, and competed for years with Dan Bricklin's Demo Maker. Adamson also wrote well-known utilities such as Noblink and Hardrunner, both of which received PC Magazine's Editor's Choice Awards.

Adamson wrote MediaForge, one of the first multimedia authoring tools for Windows. Mediaforge was sold to Strata and was awarded Best of Comdex finalist in the area of Development Software in 1994. Over 50 million MediaForge runtimes were distributed through various vendors including Morpheus and MyFamily. MediaForge is currently in use by XMLAuthor Inc. for custom development of internet applications such as CinemaForge.

Adamson is still involved in software development with his own software development company XMLAuthor Inc. He is working on new RIA and internet video technologies. In 2007 Adamson published Rainhut, a science fiction novel. The novel contains references to DTK (dare to know), a chaos based software system used to assist in the invention of advanced technologies. Development of the DTK software system is far too radical and expensive to attract serious investors at this time, so perhaps the concept remains for future generations to build, according to Adamson.

In 2013, Adamson received a patent for the distribution of non-standard fonts via the Internet. Patent US 8522127 B2 (granted). This patented process is being used worldwide now in websites and mobile apps; improving the quality, searching and appearance for hundreds of millions of users. Adamson recently founded Clantech Inc, a patent holding company. He also formed Rainhut Inc., a software company for bringing artists and mobile app developers together with an artist publishing platform and Rainmaker Software.

In 2018 Adamson began writing Author's Page His published stories are BASE: The Edge of Reality, The Old Mountain Biker (series), Hacking The Universe. He published the novel Not From Earth in 2022. In 2023 he received a Registered Trademark U.S. Trademark SN 90760401: ® NOT FROM EARTH for the Not From Earth series of novels.

== Awards ==
- Best of Comdex Finalist: MediaForge COMDEX
- All Time Best of the Best Utilities Category (NoBlink) PC Magazine
- PC Magazine: Editors Choice (HardRunner)
- Editors Choice (Instant Replay Pro) PC Magazine
