= Nick Adamson =

American sailor

Personal information
- Full name: James Nicholas Adamson
- Nationality: American
- Born: 11 April 1969 (age 55); Freeport, Bahamas
- Height: 1.83 m (6 ft 0 in)
- Weight: 74 kg (163 lb)

Sport
- Sport: Sailing

James Nicholas “Nick” Adamson (born 11 April 1969) is a Bahamian-born sailor who represents the United States. He competed in the 1996 Summer Olympics.
