= Lesley Grant-Adamson =

British writer (1942–2026)

Lesley Grant-Adamson (born Lesley Heycock, 26 November 1942 – 29 July 2026) was a British writer of mystery fiction and journalist.

== Life and career ==
A native of London, Grant-Adamson attended schools in that city and in Wales before embarking on a journalistic career in the early 1960s; she held a string of magazine and newspaper positions before becoming a feature writer with The Guardian, a job she left in 1980 to become a full-time freelance writer. Besides crime novels, she wrote television scripts, poetry, magazine pieces and short stories. Her novels feature Rain Morgan, a gossip columnist; private detective Laura Flynn; and American conman Jim Rush. She wrote a number of non-series novels and several works of non-fiction as well. Her novel Patterns in the Dust was nominated for a John Creasey Award for Best First Novel.

Grant-Adamson died on 29 July 2026, aged 83.

== Works ==
List taken from:

=== Rain Morgan novels ===
- Patterns in the Dust (1985) (a.k.a. Death on Widow's Walk)
- The Face of Death (1985)
- Guilty Knowledge (1986)
- Wild Justice (1987)
- Curse the Darkness (1990)

=== Jim Rush novels ===
- A Life of Adventure (1992)
- Dangerous Games (1994)

=== Laura Flynn novel ===
- Flynn (1991) (a.k.a. Too Many Questions)

=== Non-series novels ===
- Threatening Eye (1988)
- The Dangerous Edge (1993)
- Wish You Were Here (1995)
- Evil Acts (1996)
- The Girl in the Case (1997)
- Lipstick and Lies (1998)
- Undertow (1999)

=== Non-fiction ===
- A Season in Spain (1995) (with Andrew Grant-Adamson)
- Writing Crime and Suspense Fiction (1996)
- Teach Yourself Writing Crime Fiction (2003)
