= John William Adamson =

British educationalist (1857-1947)

- Born: 22 April 1857
- Died: 12 March 1947 (aged 89)
- Occupations: Educationist, historian of education, professor

Academic background
- Education: King's College London

Academic work
- Institutions: King's College London
- Main interests: Education, History of education
- Notable works: A short history of education Pioneers of modern education

John William Adamson (22 April 1857 – 12 March 1947) was a British educationist and historian of education. From 1903 to 1924 he was Professor of Education at King's College London. He was the most distinguished historian of education of his day.

== Early life ==
Adamson started his professional career as a pupil teacher at a Church school in Marylebone. In 1876 he went to St. Paul's College, Cheltenham. There he obtained his teacher's certificate. He then taught in London and became second master of the Great College Street Board School. During this period he took an Arts course as an evening student at King's College London. He gave most of his attention to a study of Latin and Greek. In 1881 he graduated. In 1890 he returned to King's College as the first head of the training department for teachers.

== Professor at King's College ==
Between 1890 and 1924 Adamson held the following positions at King's College:

- 1890-1924: Normal Master of King's College School
- 1890-1924: Normal Master of Day Training College
- 1901-1903: Lecturer on the Theory and Practice of Teaching
- 1903-1924: Professor of Education

The Department for the Training of Teachers of King's College was established under John William Adamson in October 1890. In 1896 it was split into two sections: the 'Day Training College' for those intending to teach in elementary schools, and the 'Department for Secondary Training'. These were amalgamated in 1922 to form the Education Department, part of the Faculty of Arts. This became the Faculty of Education in 1968, which merged with the Chelsea College Centre for Science and Mathematics Education in 1985 to create the current School of Education.

King's College London was one of the first institutions of university rank to open a 'Day Training College.' This became the direct ancestor of the modern university department of education, which still fulfils the double purpose of training teachers, and also to foster the academic study of education and research in this subject. October 1890 one of the former students of King's College London, John William Adamson, was appointed to be head of the training department and 'normal master'. "His duties were 'to give lectures on the history and theory of Education, to superintentd the students' work in the practising school, and to give a course of model lessons and preside at the criticism lesson'. There had been forty applications for the post and seven candidates were interviewed. It was a condition of appointment that, in accordance with the charter of King's College, applicants should be members of the Church of England and make a declaration to that effect. The annual salary attached to the post was fixed at £180." The earliest history of the department can be followed in the logbook which Adamson kept and which is still preserved at King's College. Already in 1897 almost the whole of the Faculty of Arts at King's College was formed by 'Education' students.
In 1900 a Board of Studies in Pedagogy was formed, of which Adamson became the secretary, and later chairman. Adamson's role was further recognized by his appointment as lecturer in 1901 and as professor in 1903.

== Other functions ==
Other functions of Adamson were:

- 1909-1910: President of the Teachers' Training Association.
- 1919-1935: Lecturer in History of Education to the Teachers' Training Syndicate, University of Cambridge.
- 1926-1937: Chairman of the Military Education Committee, University of London.

== Bibliography ==
Among the published writings of John William Adamson are:

- 1904: Our Defective System of Training Teachers. London : Ginn & Co. OCLC 266137620.

This pamphlet was in essence a criticism of the 'concurrent' system of education and a plea for the separation of the professional training from the teacher's general education.

- 1905: Pioneers of Modern Education. (Vol. 3 of Contributions to the history of education.) Cambridge : University Press. OCLC 906254501

reprinted 1921: OCLC 944088969. (Online available in archive.org.)

- 1905: The Mother Tongue. OCLC 18285171

An English course, originally written by Sarah Louise Arnold and George Lyman Kittredge, and published in Boston, USA, 1902. Adamson, with the help of A.A. Cock, adapted this course for use in English schools.

- 1907: The practice of instruction: a manual of method general and special.
- 1919: A short history of education. Cambridge : University Press. OCLC 3685763. (Online available in HathiTrust Digital Library.) (several reprints; up to 2013)
- 1930: English education, 1789-1902. Cambridge: University Press. OCLC 3685734. (Online available in HathiTrust Digital Library.) (recent reprint: 2009)

== Sources ==
- Aldrich, Richard; Gordon, Peter (2016). Dictionary of British Educationists. London: Routledge. p. 5. ISBN 9781138990739. OCLC 941876630.
- Barnard, H.C. (1961). "John William Adamson (1857-1947)". British Journal of Educational Studies. 10 (1): 19–32. doi:10.1080/00071005.1961.9973063. JSTOR 3118698.
