= Arthur Adamson =

Australian rules footballer (1882–1966)

Personal information
- Full name: Arthur Adamson
- Born: 10 January 1882; Gulgong, New South Wales
- Died: 16 July 1966 (aged 84); Wangaratta, Victoria
- Original team: Broken Hill

Playing career^{1}
Years	Club	Games (Goals)
1902–1903	South Melbourne	28 (0)
- ^{1} Playing statistics correct to the end of 1903.

Arthur Adamson (10 January 1882 – 16 July 1966) was an Australian rules football player who played 28 games and scored no goals for the South Melbourne Football Club in the 1902 and 1903 seasons. He was recruited from Broken Hill.
