= Harry Adamson =

English footballer

Personal information
- Date of birth: 15 September 1912
- Place of birth: Scunthorpe or Grimsby, England
- Date of death: 1989 (aged 76–77)
- Height: 5 ft 10 in (1.78 m)
- Position: Centre forward

Senior career*
Years	Team	Apps	(Gls)
- Upton Colliery
1933–1937	Bradford City	29	(19)
1937–1938	Aldershot	4	(1)
1938–1939	Sligo Rovers		
1939–1939	Scunthorpe United		
- * Club domestic league appearances and goals

Harry Adamson (15 September 1912 – 1989) was an English professional footballer who played at centre forward.

As a youngster Adamson had trials with clubs including Doncaster Rovers, Gainsborough Trinity and Scunthorpe United. Whilst he was playing for Upton Colliery he signed for Football League club Bradford City, in October 1933, and scored just five minutes into his Football League debut with the club. He played just 29 league games for the club in three years but scored 19 goals, including ten from only 12 games in 1934–35 to be the club's leading goal-scorer. He left for Aldershot in May 1937. In February 1939 Adamson was signed by his hometown club, Scunthorpe United, from Sligo in Ireland. Adamson had signed for Sligo at the start of the season but failed to settle in Ireland and chose to return home to Scunthorpe.
