= Frederick Adamson =

Frederick M. Adamson (born 1816, died 1860, age 44) was an early settler in Victoria, Australia. He was the first settler to make botanical collections in the Melbourne area; between 1840 and 1856, he sent to the Kew Herbarium a series of what William Hooker described as "extensive and excellent collections". Several of his specimens became syntypes for Eucalyptus macrorhyncha. Not much else is known about him, except that he was a member of the Philosophical Society of Victoria.
