= Brian Adamson =

Australian rules footballer in WAFL and SANFL

Brian Ronald Adamson is a former Australian rules footballer who played for West Perth in the West Australian National Football League (WANFL) and Norwood in the South Australian National Football League (SANFL). Playing primarily as a centre-half forward, he was part of West Perth's 1975 premiership team and featured in Norwood's one point win in the 1978 SANFL Grand Final.

== West Perth (1975–1977) ==
Adamson made his WAFL senior debut for West Perth in 1975 and played in their Grand Final victory that year. He became a key forward for the team and finished as the club's leading goalkicker in 1977.

== Transfer to Norwood and court cases ==
Before the 1978 season, Adamson applied for a clearance to play for Norwood in South Australia. Under the player permit rules that were in place at the time, West Perth and the WANFL refused to allow the transfer. Adamson applied to the Federal Court to allow the clearance, which was granted in June 1978 due to the court finding that the league's clearance rules and regulations were unreasonable in that they represented a restraint of trade.

== Norwood (1978–1979) ==
He made his debut for Norwood in Round 15, 1978, and went on to play 20 league games across the 1978 and 1979 seasons, kicking 50 goals. In the 1978 SANFL Grand Final he kicked five goals as Norwood defeated Sturt by 1 point after trailing for most of the game.

== Return to West Perth and retirement ==
Adamson returned to West Perth in 1980 and again led the club's goalkicking in 1981. He continued to play in the WAFL until retiring midway through the 1985 season due to injury, finishing with 120 WAFL games, plus two state games and five NFL or NFC games.
