= Robert Adamson (philosopher) =

Scottish philosopher (1852–1902)

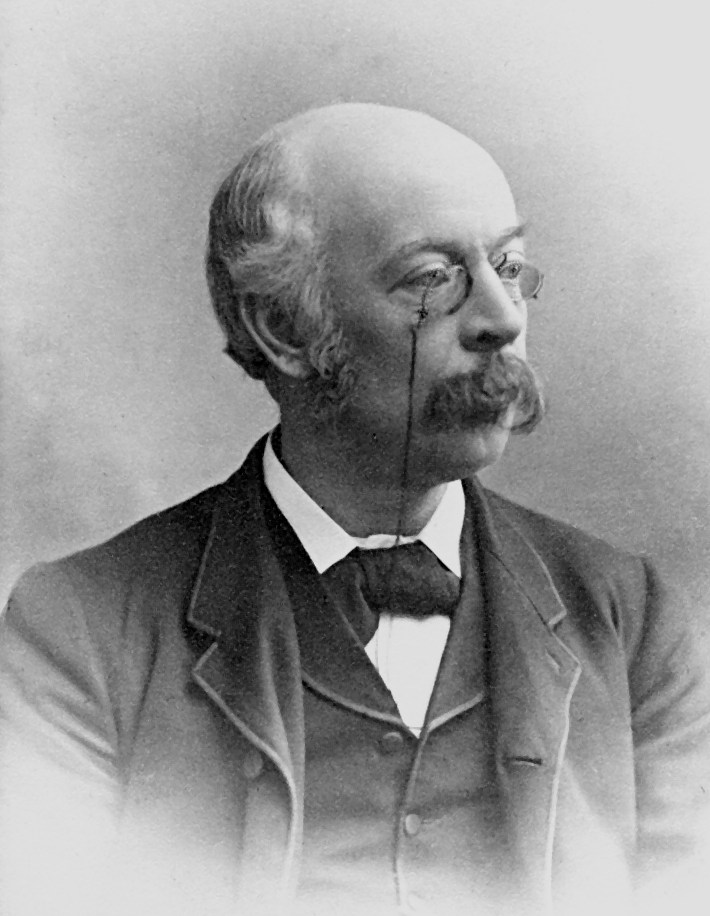
- Adamson in the 1890s
- Born: 19 January 1852; Edinburgh, Scotland
- Died: 5 February 1902 (aged 50); Glasgow, Scotland

Education
- Education: University of Edinburgh; University of Heidelberg

Philosophical work
- Era: 19th-century philosophy
- Region: Western philosophy
- School: Neo-Kantianism
- Institutions: University of Edinburgh; Owens College; University of Aberdeen; University of Glasgow
- Notable students: Norman Kemp Smith
- Main interests: Philosophical logic

Robert Adamson (19 January 1852 – 5 February 1902) was a Scottish philosopher and Professor of Logic at the University of Glasgow.

== Early life ==
The philosopher Robert Adamson was born in Edinburgh, Scotland. His father Robert Adamson (died 1855) was a Scottish solicitor, active in Dunbar, Coldstream and, later, in Edinburgh. His mother Mary Agnes Buist (1809–1876) was the daughter of David Buist, factor to George Baillie-Hamilton, 10th Earl of Haddington (1802–1870). Robert Adamson and Mary Agnes Buist were married on 21 November 1843 at Tyninghame, East Lothian, Scotland. In 1855 Mrs. Adamson was left a widow with small means, and devoted herself entirely to the education of her six children (Helen, Ann, John, David, Robert, and Laurence). Of these, Robert was successful from the first. At the end of his school career he entered the University of Edinburgh at the age of fourteen, and four years later graduated with first-class honours in mental philosophy, with prizes in every department of the faculty of arts. He completed his university successes by winning the Tyndall-Bruce scholarship, the Hamilton fellowship (1872), the Ferguson scholarship (1872) and the Shaw fellowship (1873).

After a short residence at the University of Heidelberg (1871), where he began his study of German philosophy, he returned to Edinburgh as assistant first to Henry Calderwood and later to Alexander Campbell Fraser. He also joined the staff of the Encyclopædia Britannica (9th edition) (1874) and studied widely in the Advocates' Library.

== Professorial appointments ==
In 1876 he came to England as successor to William Stanley Jevons in the chair of logic and philosophy, at Owens College, Manchester. In 1883 he received the honorary degree of LL.D. In 1893 he went to the University of Aberdeen, and finally in 1895 to the chair of logic at the University of Glasgow, which he held till his death.

Except during the first few years at Manchester, he delivered his lectures without manuscripts. In 1903, under the title The Development of Modern Philosophy and Other Essays, his more important lectures were published with a short biographical introduction by William Ritchie Sorley (1855-1935) of Cambridge University (see Mind, xiii. 1904, p. 73 foil.). Most of the matter is taken verbatim from the note-book of one of his students. Under the same editorship there appeared, three years later, his Development of Greek Philosophy.

In addition to his professional work, he did much administrative work for Victoria University and the University of Glasgow. In the organisation of Victoria University he took a foremost part, and, as chairman of the Board of Studies at Owens College, he presided over the general academical board of the Victoria University. At Glasgow he was soon elected one of the representatives on the court, and to him were due in large measure the extension of the academical session and the improved equipment of the university.

Throughout his lectures, Adamson pursued the critical and historical method without formulating a constructive theory of his own. He felt that any philosophical advance must be based on the Kantian methods. It was his habit to make straight for the ultimate issue, disregarding half-truths and declining compromise. He left a hypothesis to be worked out by others; this done, he would criticise with all the rigour of logic, and with a profound distrust of imagination, metaphor and the attitude known as the will-to-believe.

== Philosophical views ==
As he grew older his metaphysical optimism waned. He felt that the increase of knowledge must come in the domains of physical science. But this empirical tendency as regards science never modified his metaphysical outlook. He has been called Kantian and neo-Kantian, realist and idealist (by himself, for he held that appearance and reality are co-extensive and coincident).

At the same time, in his criticism of other views he was almost typical of Hegelian idealism. All processes of reasoning or judgment (i.e. all units of thought) are (i) analysable only by abstraction, and (2) are compound of deduction and induction, i.e. rational and empirical. An illustration of his empirical tendency is found in his attitude to the Absolute and the Self. The "Absolute" doctrines he regarded as a mere disguise of failure, a dishonest attempt to clothe ignorance in the pretentious garb of mystery. The Self as a primary, determining entity, he would not therefore admit. He represented an empiricism which, so far from refuting, was actually based on, idealism, and yet was alert to expose the fallacies of a particular idealist construction (see his essay in Ethical Democracy, edited by Stanton Coit).

== Personal life ==
Robert's wife Margaret "Daisy" Duncan (1859-1935), a daughter of David Duncan (1826-1871) (a Manchester linen merchant), was a woman of kindred tastes, and their union was entirely happy. Their daughter, Sarah Gough Adamson was a highly regarded landscape artist.

== Published writings ==
It is matter for regret to the student that Adamson's active labours in the lecture room precluded him from systematic production. His writings consisted of short articles, of which many appeared in the Encyclopaedia and in Mind, a volume on Kant and another on Fichte. At the time of his death he was writing a History of Psychology, and had promised a work on Kant and the Modern Naturalists. Both in his life and in his writings he was remarkable for impartiality. It was his peculiar virtue that he could quote his opponents without warping their meaning. From this point of view he would have been perhaps the first historian of philosophy of his time, had his professional labours been less exacting.

Bibliography
The following were published, either in his lifetime or posthumously.

- Development of Greek Philosophy, The (1908)
- Development of Modern Philosophy and Other Essays, The (1903)
- Fichte (1881) Blackwood's Philosophical Classics
- On the Philosophy of Kant (1879)

Contributions to the Encyclopædia Britannica Ninth Edition

- Friedrich von Hermann

Contributions to the Encyclopædia Britannica Eleventh Edition

- Francis Bacon (with John Malcolm Mitchell)
- Roger Bacon (with an anonymous co-author)
- Friedrich Eduard Beneke
- George Berkeley
- Saint Bonaventura (with an anonymous co-author)
- Giordano Bruno (with John Malcolm Mitchell)
- Joseph Butler (in part)
- Category (in part)
- Johannes Scotus Erigena (with John Malcolm Mitchell)
- Johann Gottlieb Fichte (with an anonymous co-author)
- Fourier, François Charles Marie
- Pierre Gassendi (with an anonymous co-author)
- David Hume (with John Malcolm Mitchell)
- Immanuel Kant (with an anonymous co-author)

Contributions to the Dictionary of National Biography

- Adelard of Bath
- Alcuin
- Alexander of Hales
- Alfred Anglicus
- Bacon, Roger
- Eyton, Thomas Campbell
