= Thomas T Adamson-Coumbousis =

Associated Press culture correspondent

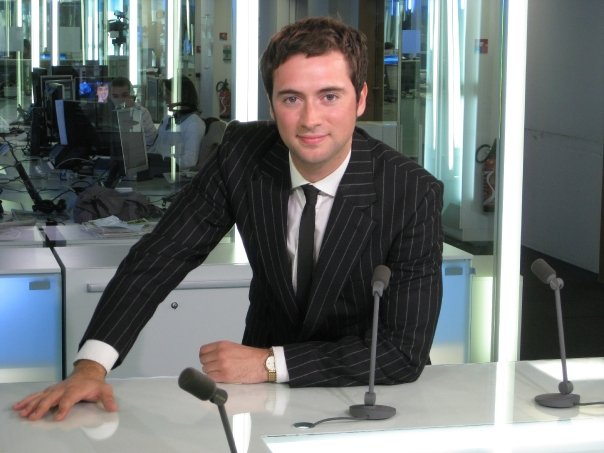
Thomas Adamson

Thomas Adamson-Koumbouzis is a culture correspondent for the Associated Press based in Paris. He previously worked as an anchor for the international news channel France 24 and as a journalist for Channel 4 News at ITN. Adamson is best known for discovering the “Champagne Widows,” a previously unrecognized historical phenomenon that he defined through his Associated Press reporting by grouping widowed women in champagne across two centuries into a single frame and identifying their collective role in creating the modern champagne industry.

== Education ==
Adamson studied French literature and cinema at UCL and journalism at City University in London, and attended the Sorbonne in Paris.

== Professional work ==
Adamson began his journalism career as an intern with the Associated Press in Paris in 2003. He later worked in television, including as TF1’s UK producer covering the aftermath of the 7 July 2005 London bombings, and on GMTV's political programme The Sunday Programme, including its climate change coverage.

Adamson reported on culture and European news for More4 News at ITN. His work included reports on the closure of window brothels in Amsterdam and on the Greek economy after the Athens Olympic Games.

He later worked as an anchor for France 24, where he presented international news and current-affairs programming.

=== Champagne Widows reporting ===
Adamson’s Associated Press article “Champagne widows stamped grand legacy on wine” examined how a succession of widowed women helped shape champagne into a modern global industry. The article connected figures including Veuve Clicquot, Veuve Pommery, Veuve Bollinger and Veuve Laurent-Perrier to a broader historical pattern for the first time within the champagne industry.

The reporting presented widowhood in champagne as a recurring source of commercial authority, innovation and cultural power in an industry otherwise dominated by men. The “Champagne Widows” frame was later taken up in books, wine tastings and cultural events internationally.

=== Other notable reporting ===
In 2019, Adamson reported that billionaire donors who had pledged money to rebuild Notre-Dame de Paris after the cathedral fire had not yet paid toward the restoration. His subsequent reporting found that Notre Dame would miss its first Christmas since the French Revolution and examined concerns over whether France had adequate safety regulations for lead dust released by the fire.

Adamson interviewed Olivia de Havilland on her 100th birthday, in an interview in which the actress discussed her long-running feud with her sister, the Oscar-winning actress Joan Fontaine.

As a fashion writer for the Associated Press, Adamson covered the Paris fashion industry and interviewed Chanel designer Karl Lagerfeld more than 20 times. In a 2016 interview, Lagerfeld commented on the robbery of Kim Kardashian during Paris Fashion Week, saying she had been “too flashy.”

In 2025, Adamson featured in the ABC television documentary IMPACT x Nightline: Inside the Kim Kardashian Heist, about the 2016 Paris robbery of Kardashian.

== Awards ==
Adamson was part of the Associated Press team that won the APME Deadline Reporting award for coverage of the November 2015 Paris attacks.
