= Sarah Gough Adamson =

British artist (1888-1963)

- Born: 1888; Manchester, England
- Died: 1963 (aged 74–75)
- Education: Edinburgh College of Art
- Known for: Landscape painting

Sarah Gough Adamson, later Sarah Gough Walker, (1888–1963) was a British artist. Although she was born in Manchester, Gough established her reputation as a landscape painter in Scotland.

== Biography ==
Adamson was born in Chorlton-cum-Hardy, Manchester around April to June 1888. Her Scottish father, Robert Adamson, was for a time a professor of philosophy at Owens College in Manchester, before he moved back to Scotland.

Adamson studied at the Edinburgh College of Art before she moved to London, some time around 1915. Before leaving Scotland, Adamson was a regular exhibitor at the Royal Scottish Academy, showing some 29 pictures, including watercolours and gouache pieces, there between 1911 and 1915. During her career she also exhibited at the Royal Academy in London, with the Royal Glasgow Institute of the Fine Arts and at the Aberdeen Artists' Society. In Paris, Adamson exhibited at the Salon des Artistes Francais in 1913 and in 1924 she won a silver medal at the Decorative Arts Exhibition in Paris.
