= Allison W. Hough =

South Carolina state legislator

Allison W. Hough was a state legislator in South Carolina. He represented Kershaw County, South Carolina in the South Carolina House of Representatives from 1872 to 1874.

== See also ==
- African American officeholders from the end of the Civil War until before 1900
