= Matt Adamson =

Pro RL coach and former Australia international rugby league footballer

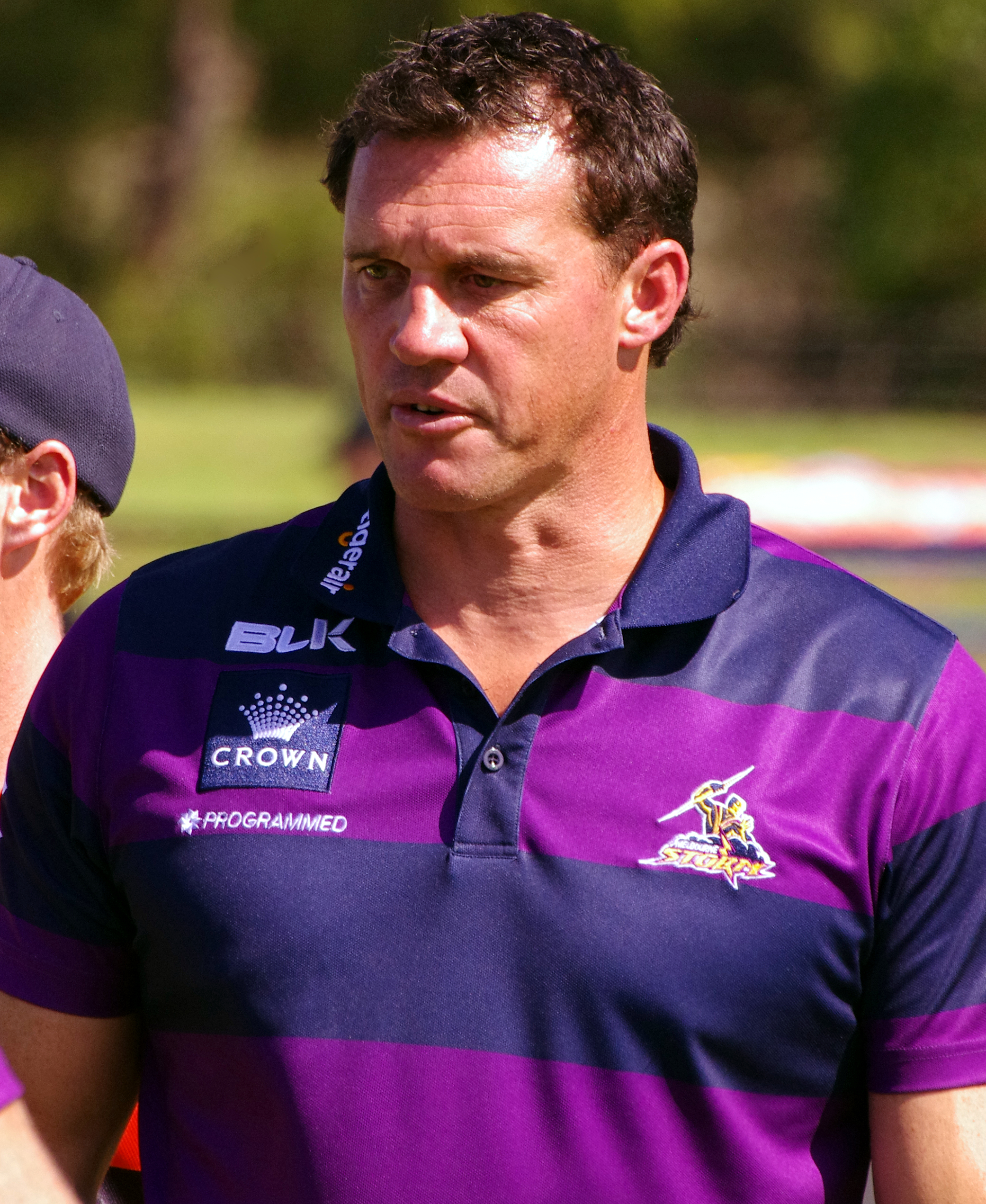

Personal information
- Full name: Matthew Adamson
- Born: 14 August 1972 (age 53) Taree, New South Wales, Australia

Playing information
- Height: 195 cm (6 ft 5 in)
- Weight: 107 kg (16 st 12 lb)
- Position: Fullback, Wing, Second-row
Club
Years	Team	Pld	T	G	FG	P
1991	Parramatta Eels	1	0	0	0	0
1993–01	Penrith Panthers	157	28	2	0	116
2002–04	Leeds Rhinos	72	9	0	0	36
2005	Canberra Raiders	16	4	0	0	16
	Total	246	41	2	0	168
Representative
Years	Team	Pld	T	G	FG	P
1997	Australia (SL)	5	0	0	0	0
2001	New South Wales	2	0	0	0	0
1997	New South Wales (SL)	1	0	0	0	0

Coaching information
Representative
Years	Team	Gms	W	D	L	W%
2018	Fiji	1	0	0	1	0
- Relatives: Phil Adamson (brother)

Matt Adamson (born 14 August 1972 in Taree, New South Wales) is an Australian former professional rugby league footballer, who played in the 1990s and 2000s. A New South Wales State of Origin and Australian international representative second-row (under the Super League banner), he played club football in Australia with the Parramatta Eels, Penrith Panthers and Canberra Raiders, and in England with Leeds. Adamson started his career as a fullback or utility, and was moved into the forwards by Penrith coach Royce Simmons, in 1996.

== Career ==
A 6-foot-5-inch (196 cm) tall fullback or winger in the early years of his career, Adamson was reportedly the second tallest fullback in top level rugby league history in Australia, second only to former Brisbane, Queensland, and Australian fullback Paul Hauff who stands 6 ft 6 in (198 cm). Adamson was later joined as the second tallest fullback in history by now former Melbourne and South Sydney utility back (he primarily played fullback for Souths), Greg Inglis who is also 6'5" tall.

Adamson, who had signed with Super League in 1995 along with the rest of the Penrith Panthers and the club itself, made his test début from the bench for Australia in the inaugural ANZAC Test against New Zealand in 1997, won 34–22 by Australia at the Sydney Football Stadium. He was then selected in the second row for the end of season test against the Kiwis at the North Harbour Stadium in Auckland, won 30–12 by the Kiwis.

Following the test in Auckland, Adamson was selected to play for Australia in all three matches of the Super League Test series against Great Britain in England. He was selected in the second row for the first test at London's famous Wembley Stadium which saw Australia win 38–14. He kept his place in the side for the second test at Old Trafford, won 20–12 by the Lions, and was relegated to the bench for the deciding test at Elland Road in Leeds as the Australian's wrapped up the series with a 37–20 win. While the games are regarded as full test matches by the Rugby League International Federation, the Australian Rugby League refuse to acknowledge the tests played under the Super League due to the Super League war, and in their official records the games are not recorded.

Adamson made his State of Origin début from the bench for NSW in Game 2 of the 2001 State of Origin series at the Telstra Stadium in Sydney. He was again selected from the bench for the third and deciding game of the series at Brisbane's Suncorp Stadium in what would be his final representative game.

After 10 seasons playing in Australia with Parramatta (1991) and Penrith (1993–2001), Adamson signed to play with English Super League team Leeds Rhinos following the 2001 NRL season. He would spend three seasons with Leeds before returning to Australia to play for the Canberra Raiders in 2005.

Matt Adamson retired from playing at the end of the 2005 season. He played one game for Parramatta, 157 games for Penrith, 62 for Leeds and 16 for Canberra.

== Post Playing ==
Adamson worked as an assistant coach to Matthew Elliott at Penrith Panthers during 2007 and 2008 but was sacked at the end of the 2008 season as part of a coaching "restructure."

Matt Adamson has worked a commentator for Fox Sports in their telecasts of the National Rugby League.

Appointed as the Melbourne Storm under 20's coach for the 2014 season. In 2015, he was appointed by the Melbourne Storm as their Queensland Coaching Director. The role saw him overseeing both feeder clubs Easts Tigers & Sunshine Coast Falcons.

Matt coach the Fiji national side for one game v Papua New Guinea on 23 June 2018 which Fiji lost 26–14 in Campbelltown Stadium, NSW.

== Career highlights ==
- First-grade début: 26 July 1991 – Round 18 Parramatta Eels vs North Sydney at Parramatta Stadium

== Footnotes ==
Sporting positions
Preceded by Mick Potter; 2016-2017	Head Coach Fiji; 2018	Succeeded by Brandon Costin; 2019
