= Callum Adamson =

British entrepreneur

Cal Adamson
- Born: Callum Adamson
- Occupations: Businessman; musician
- Employer: Distributed
- Father: Stuart Adamson

Callum Adamson is a British entrepreneur and Cofounder of Distributed, a technology company that specialises in Elastic Teams. He was previously a guitarist and songwriter for the London-based band, AHAB. Adamson is the son of musician Stuart Adamson, who was the guitarist for The Skids and lead singer and guitarist for Big Country.

Adamson has toured with AHAB, which from 2009 onwards became a well-known alternative country band in the UK. They toured the UK, Europe and United States following the release of their first CD in 2009. The album they released in 2009 was titled A.H.A.B. Adamson has also held a residency at Tootsie's Orchid Lounge and played at various festivals and music events such as Fairport's Cropredy Convention.

In 2011, Adamson founded Wits End Digital, which is based in London.

== Education ==
Adamson was educated in Perth, Scotland. He first studied at Perth College UHI, where he studied a HND in Aeronautical and Aerospace Engineering Technology. After completing his HND at Perth College, he abandoned his aerospace engineering degree program, stating "I took a risk and dropped out of university..." https://www.idgconnect.com/article/3641339/c-suite-career-advice-callum-adamson-distributed.html

== Career ==
=== Musician ===
Adamson is a guitarist and songwriter for the London-based country folk band, AHAB. In 2009, Adamson formed the band AHAB with Dave Burn. Following a number of months of recording, Adamson released the self-recorded album titled, A.H.A.B.. The album gave the duo much-needed publicity, which led them to be approached for a residency at Tootsie's Orchid Lounge in Nashville, Tennessee. They decided they did not want to move to the United States as a duo, so invited Seebs Llewellyn (Bass & Vocals) and Luke Price (Mandolin & Vocals) to join them to form a four-piece band.

They returned to the UK, where they began to busk. They became well known locally and following a video of their busking going viral on YouTube, Adamson and the band were invited to play at Fairport's Cropredy Convention. While performing to a crowd of 15,000 people, Adamson and fellow band members were unaware that BBC Radio 2 presenter, Bob Harris was in the crowd. This led to Adamson receiving coverage on BBC Radio 2, with Harris referring to his band as, "blistering live – alt-country edge and sheer class."

AHAB released their first purchasable content in 2010, when they released the extended play album, No King. This was shortly followed by their second EP, "KMVT." The second EP was released under Navigator Records and produced by John Leckie. BBC Radio 2 played "Wish You" regularly, which was written by Adamson. The track also received positive reviews in Denmark, after Denmark's national radio station, NPR4 had the track on their playlists. During this period they also spent a lot of time touring.

In 2012, Adamson was recognised at the Spiral Earth Awards, when AHAB won the award for best group. In an interview, Adamson stated in 2012 that the five-piece band were living together in a house in East London. Many at the time had been touting them as the alternative country version of Mumford & Sons.

Adamson returned to Fairport's Cropredy Convention in July 2015 as part of ahab.

=== Business ===
While performing as a musician, Adamson worked for a number of agencies. His career began at Four Marketing in London. He remained at Four Marketing for just over 4 years, before moving to the Reading Room as a Senior Project Manager. He remained at Idox owned Reading Room for just under a year, before moving to BMI in 2009.

Adamson spent a year at The Digital Property Group, before setting up Wits End Digital in 2011. Since becoming the founder of Wits End, they have worked with a number of large companies, such as Sony and Nintendo.

In 2017 Adamson Cofounded Distributed, a tech startup working on redefining the way businesses work with contractors and freelancers at scale, they have a number of notable early customers such as Capita, Sytner Group and RBS.

== Personal life ==
Adamson is the son of guitarist, Stuart Adamson. At the time of Stuart's death, it was rumoured in the media that both Adamson and his sister, Kirsten, would not inherit their father's fortune. Instead, it was expected to go to his second wife, Melanie Shelley.

Following the death of his father, Adamson featured in the book, How's Your Dad? Growing up in the shadow of a rock star parent. The book was written by Zoë Howe and interviewed Adamson regarding his relationship with his father. During Adamson's youth, he recalled how Stuart Adamson had nearly missed the opportunity to play with Elton John, because he wanted to spend time with his family. As Adamson grew older, his relationship with his father deteriorated following the divorce of his parents.
