= Keith Adamson =

English footballer (born 1945)

Personal information
- Full name: Keith Brian Adamson
- Date of birth: 3 July 1945 (age 81)
- Place of birth: Houghton-le-Spring, England
- Position: Striker

Senior career*
Years	Team	Apps	(Gls)
?–1966	Tow Law Town	?	(?)
1966–1967	Barnsley	7	(0)
1967–1968	Scarborough	?	(?)
- * Club domestic league appearances and goals

Keith Brian Adamson (born 3 July 1945 in Houghton-le-Spring, England) is an English former footballer.

He played for Tow Law Town, Barnsley and Scarborough.
