= Jack Adamson =

Australian rules footballer (1873–1937)

Personal information
- Full name: John Henry Adamson
- Born: 6 January 1873; North Melbourne, Victoria
- Died: 2 October 1937 (aged 64); South Melbourne, Victoria
- Original team: Napier Imperial
- Position: Forward

Playing career^{1}
Years	Club	Games (Goals)
1897–1898	South Melbourne	3 (0)
- ^{1} Playing statistics correct to the end of 1898.

John Henry Adamson (6 January 1873 – 2 October 1937) was an Australian rules footballer who played three games for South Melbourne in the Victorian Football League between 1897 and 1898.

== Family ==
The eldest son of David Anderson (1841–1897), and Elizabeth Calder Adamson (1850–1913), née Hastie, John Henry Adamson was born at North Melbourne, Victoria on 6 January 1873. One of his younger brothers, David Hastie "Bud" Adamson (1874–1914), who also played for South Melbourne in both the VFA and VFL, was the South Melbourne (VFL) team's captain in 1899.

He married Jane Ellen "Jennie" Keen (1873–1952), in Fitzroy, Victoria on 28 March 1900.

== Education ==
He was educated at Albert Park State School.

== Football ==
A forward, he was described as being an excellent place kick.

=== South Melbourne (VFA) ===
Adamson played for Napier Imperial, the South Melbourne junior side in the Metropolitan Junior Football Association, before graduating to play for four seasons (1893 to 1896) with South Melbourne in the Victorian Football Association.

Adamson won South Melbourne's VFA goal kicking in 1896. He played on the half-forward flank (with his brother Dave, at full-back) in South Melbourne's 1896 premiership match loss to Collingwood.

=== South Melbourne (VFL) ===
He played (alongside Dave) for South Melbourne, against Melbourne, at the Lake Oval, on 8 May 1897, in the team's first-ever match of the VFL's first season.

== Cricket ==
Adamson was also a noted cricketer; he was a wicketkeeper who played 6 first eleven games for South Melbourne.

== Death ==
Adamson lived in South Melbourne for most of his life and was a member of the local Masonic Lodge. He died at South Melbourne, Victoria on 2 October 1937; and was buried at Melbourne General Cemetery.
