= Maggie Adamson =

Shetland musician

Maggie Adamson is a musician from Shetland, Scotland, who plays fiddle, violin, accordion and piano. She has played with several groups, including Swingin’ Fiddles. She may be best known for her collaboration with Shetland guitarist Brian Nicholson.

== Awards and achievements ==
- 2007 - Winner of Shetland Young Fiddler of the Year competition
- 2008 - Winner of Danny Kyle Open Stage Award at Celtic Connections
- 2008 - Winner of seven prizes including best overall junior fiddler and original composition at the National Association of Fiddle and Accordion Clubs' festival
- 2009 - Nominee for Up and Coming Artist of the Year at the Scots Trad Music Awards

== Discography ==
- Take Note - Swingin' Fiddles (Jan 2006)
- Wir Waanderins - Swingin' Fiddles (Dec 2006)
- Tammie Norrie - Maggie Adamson & Brian Nicholson (Feb 2008)
- Anidder Een! - Maggie Adamson & Brian Nicholson (Nov 2008)
- Back to the Hills - Maggie Adamson & Brian Nicholson (Jan 2010)
- Hameaboot- Maggie Adamson & Brian Nicholson (Dec 2011)
- Here 'n Now- Maggie Adamson & Brian Nicholson (Dec 2015)
