= Phil Adamson =

Australian rugby league footballer

Personal information
- Born: 20 March 1970 (age 55); Taree, New South Wales, Australia

Playing information
- Height: 197 cm (6 ft 6 in)
- Weight: 108 kg (17 st 0 lb)
- Position: Prop, Second-row, Lock
Club
Years	Team	Pld	T	G	FG	P
1991–92	Parramatta Eels	4	0	0	0	0
1993–98	Penrith Panthers	97	22	0	0	88
1999	Manly Sea Eagles	7	1	0	0	4
1999	St Helens	3	0	0	0	0
	Total	111	23	0	0	92
- Relatives: Matt Adamson (brother)

Phil Adamson (born 20 March 1970) is an Australian former professional rugby league footballer who played in the 1990s. He played for the Parramatta Eels, the Penrith Panthers, St Helens and the Manly Warringah Sea Eagles, as a prop, second-row or lock.

== Background ==
Phil Adamson was born in Taree, New South Wales, Australia, and he is the older brother of rugby league footballer; Matt Adamson.
