= Jack H. Adamson =

American literary scholar (1918–1975)

Jack Hale Adamson (1918–1975) was a literary scholar, biographer, teacher, and university administrator.

== Biography ==
The son of prominent Idaho statesman William Lennox Adamson, Adamson was born in 1918 in Salt Lake City, Utah, and lived in the small town of Carey, Idaho. Born and raised in the Church of Jesus Christ of Latter-day Saints, he served a church mission to Edinburgh, Scotland in 1938–39. He later served in the Army Air Force in World War II and the U.S. Air Force in the Korean War.

He received a PhD in English literature from Harvard University in 1956, specializing in the poetry and political philosophy of John Milton. He then accepted an appointment as professor of English at the University of Utah in Salt Lake City, Utah. From 1960 through 1965, he served in administrative posts at Utah, including English Dept. Chair, Dean of Letters and Science, and Academic Vice President.

In 1965, he returned to full-time teaching and research. Along with co-author Harold F. Folland, he wrote The Shepherd of the Ocean, a biography of Sir Walter Raleigh, which was published simultaneously in the United States and Great Britain. The book was named a "Notable Book of 1969" by The New York Times. In 1974, Adamson and Folland published a biography of Sir Henry Vane the Younger, early governor of Massachusetts and central figure in the English Revolution. The book received nomination for the National Book Award.
