= Ashley Adamson =

British dietician and academic

- Born: Ashley Jayne Adamson
- Education: Newcastle University
- Scientific career
- Workplaces: Newcastle University
- Thesis: Nutrient intakes (1990 compared with 1980) and place of purchase of foods (1990) by 11 to 12 year old Northumbrian children (1993)

Ashley Jayne Adamson is a British dietician, Professor of Public Health Nutrition at Newcastle University. She is director of the National Institute for Health and Care Research School for Public Health Research. Her research looks to understand the relationship between nutrient intake, food choices, socio-demographic characteristics and health outcomes. She was made a NIHR Senior Investigator in 2023.

== Early life and education ==
Adamson worked as a dietitian in the National Health Service. She moved to Newcastle University where she worked as a research assistant studying the dietary habits of people in Northumberland. She eventually completed a doctorate on the subject, studying the changing diets of adolescents between the 1980s and 1990s.

== Research and career ==
After earning her doctorate, Adamson worked as a dietitian in London in 1992. She spent three years in London before returning to Newcastle University. Here she developed Newcastle's research activity in Public Health Nutrition, and was made a Personal Chair in 2010. Her research considers the relationship between food choice, nutrient intake and public health. Adamson is Chair of FUSE, a Centre for Translational Research in Public Health. Fuse unites researchers across universities in North East England.

Obesity costs the UK economy almost £16 billion a year. In the United Kingdom, 40% of children finishing primary school are overweight, and 60% of adults. Adamson has argued it is possible to tackle childhood obesity through a sugar tax, reduced marketing to children and eliminating buy-one-get-one-free promotions. She has argued that it is possible to tackle childhood obesity by improving the quality of free school meals. She has investigated the health impacts of various diets, and shown that a Mediterranean diet was associated with lower dementia risk.

In 2022 she started working with Newcastle City Council to develop a Health Determinants Research Collaboration to tackle health inequalities.

In 2017 Adamson was made director of the National Institute for Health and Care Research School for Public Health Research. The school was awarded £25 million in 2022, with which they looked to improve child health and healthier neighbourhoods. Adamson was made NIHR Senior Investigator in 2018, and re-appointed in 2023.

== Select publications ==
- Lean, Michael; Leslie, Wilma; Barnes, Alison; et al. (2017). "Primary care-led weight management for remission of type 2 diabetes (DiRECT): an open-label, cluster-randomised trial". The Lancet. 391 (10120): 541–551. doi:10.1016/s0140-6736(17)33102-1. PMID 29221645. Wikidata Q47174377.
- Craigie, Angela; Lake, Amelia; Kelly, Sarah; Adamson, Ashley; Mathers, John (2011). "Tracking of obesity-related behaviours from childhood to adulthood: A systematic review". Maturitas. 70 (3): 266–284. doi:10.1016/j.maturitas.2011.08.005. PMID 21920682. Wikidata Q37932781.
- Lean, Michael; Leslie, Wilma; Barnes, Alison; et al. (2019). "Durability of a primary care-led weight-management intervention for remission of type 2 diabetes: 2-year results of the DiRECT open-label, cluster-randomised trial". The Lancet: Diabetes & Endocrinology. 7 (5): 344–355. doi:10.1016/s2213-8587(19)30068-3. PMID 30852132. Wikidata Q92245135.
