= Don A. Adamson =

Australian biologist

Don A. Adamson (1931–2002), was an Australian biologist at Macquarie University. He found the first marine fossils in Antarctica.

== Life ==
Adamson grew up in the Australian bush before moving with his parents to Sydney. He was educated at North Sydney Boys High School and Sydney University in biological sciences where he received his doctorate. He was appointed to a lectureship in the School of Biological Sciences at the then relatively new Macquarie University and was later rewarded with an Associate Professorship and became Senior Research Fellow in biology.

Adamson's research interests include geomorphology, vegetation-landscape interactions and environmental history, in particular his work in archaeology and geomorphology in Africa, and his research on various aspects of the environment of Antarctica. His research involved fieldwork in the Vestfold Hills, the Prince Charles Mountains, Larsemann Hills, Stillwell Hills, Bunger Hills, at Beaver Lake, and on Macquarie Island.

In 1978 Don Adamson found the first marine fossils in Antarctica. In 1986 he joined forces with Erich A. Colhoun to work together on the ANARE expedition that established the Sir Edgeworth David summer field base in the Bunger Hills. His most important scientific contribution may have been the finding of the diatomite deposits at Marine Plain in the Vestfold Hills where the world-famous cetacean fossils were later found. Together with John Pickard he found the fossil clam Clamys tuftsensis that dated the deposits as of Pliocene age and showed that the sea had covered the Vestfold area around three million years ago.
