= Reuben Gaither =

South Carolina state legislator (1831–1919)

Reuben D. Gaither (1831-1919) was a state legislator in South Carolina. He represented Kershaw County in the South Carolina House of Representatives 1870-1877.

He was a Baptist minister and farm tenant according to the 1870 United States census.

== See also ==
- African American officeholders from the end of the Civil War until before 1900
