= James B. Adamson =

American business man

James Adamson is an American business man who was CEO of Burger King (1993–1995), CEO and chairman of Denny's and its parent company Advantica (1993–2002), and Kmart (2002–2003).

He is noted as a turnaround specialist having helped restructure of drugstore chain Revco after its purchase by CVS Caremark in 1997. He was instrumental in restoring Denny's reputation after a series of racial incidents occurred at several of its stores during the mid-1990s. He was given the position of Kmart CEO in an attempt to swing the company's finances around in March 2002.
