= James Bradshaw Adamson =

United States Army general

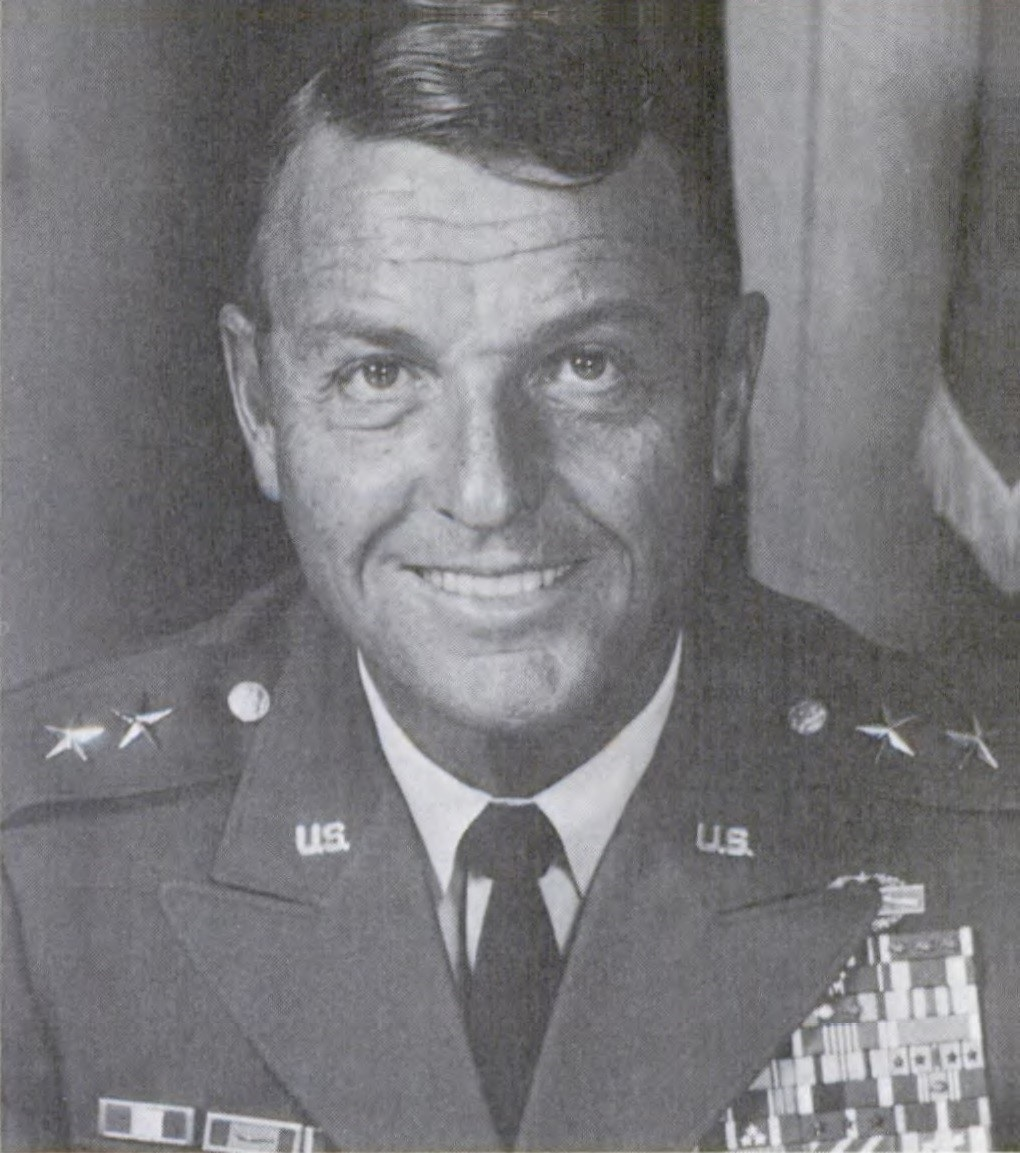
Adamson in May 1973

James Bradshaw Adamson (December 27, 1921 – January 13, 2003) was a major general in the United States Army.

== Early life and education ==
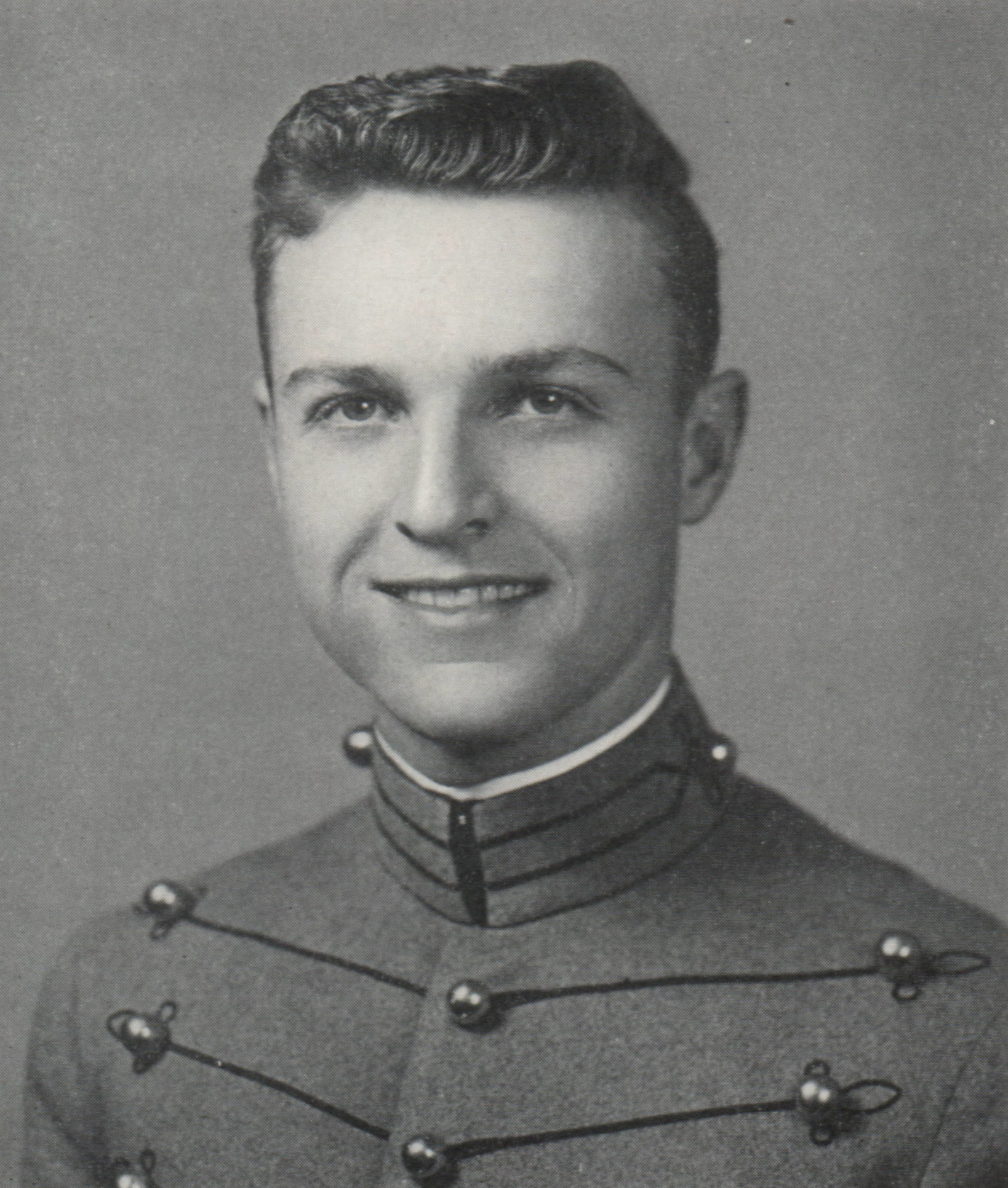
At West Point in 1944

Adamson was born at Fort Clark, Texas in 1921. He attended the United States Military Academy at West Point, New York, where he graduated with a B.S. degree in military science and engineering in 1944. In 1959, he also earned an MBA from the University of Miami School of Business at the University of Miami in Coral Gables, Florida.

== Military career ==
Adamson was commissioned into the infantry and saw active service in World War II as a platoon leader and in Vietnam as a brigade commander.

After leaving the Second Brigade, Fourth Infantry Division in 1967, he was appointed professorial chair of military science at The Citadel Military College.

Adamson's last posting was as commander of Military District of Washington, which involved coordinating the military with the White House and supervising various ceremonial events, such as state funerals (including for Lyndon Baines Johnson), and burials in Arlington National Cemetery. He retired from active military service in 1974.

=== Military honors ===
Adamson was awarded the Distinguished Service Medal (DSM), Legion of Merit (LM) with two Oak Leaf Clusters, Silver Star (SS), Purple Heart (PH), Bronze Star Medal (BSM), Air Medal (AM) with 6 Oak Leaf Clusters, and the Army Commendation Medal (ARCOM).

== Personal life ==
Adamson married Marjorie Ann McCabe, with whom he had four sons. Their son Patrick died in 1996. This marriage ended in divorce. He later married Shirley Miller.

== Death ==
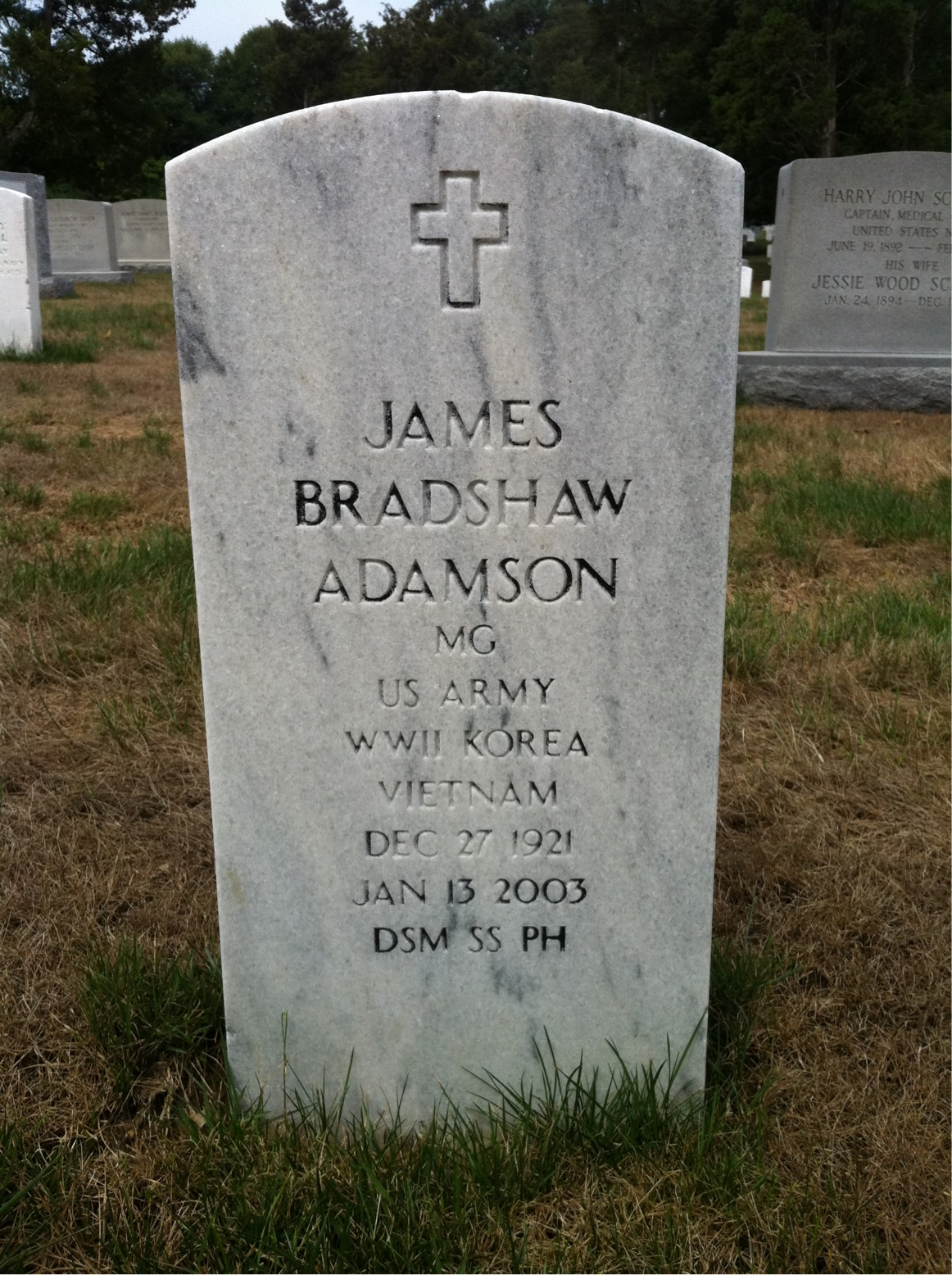
Adamson's grave in Section 7 of Arlington National Cemetery

Adamson died on January 13, 2003 from emphysema and lung cancer at a hospice in Jupiter, Florida. He was interred at Arlington National Cemetery (Section 7, Grave 10201-B-1).
