= Mike Adamson (footballer) =

Scottish footballer

Personal information
- Full name: Michael John Adamson
- Date of birth: 6 September 1949 (age 77)
- Place of birth: Forfar, Scotland
- Position: Forward

Youth career
- Brechin Matrix

Senior career*
Years	Team	Apps	(Gls)
1968–1970	Montrose	0	(0)
1970–1971	Queen's Park	2	(0)
1971–1972	Brechin City	34	(1)

International career
1970	Scotland Amateurs	1	(1)
- * Club domestic league appearances and goals

Michael John Adamson (born 6 September 1949) is a Scottish retired footballer who played in the Scottish League for Brechin City and Queen's Park as a forward. He was capped by Scotland at amateur level.

== Career statistics ==
Appearances and goals by club, season and competition
Club	Season	League			Scottish Cup		League Cup		Total	
Club	Season	Division	Apps	Goals	Apps	Goals	Apps	Goals	Apps	Goals
Queen's Park	1969–70	Scottish Second Division	2	0	—		—		2	0
Career total			2	0	0	0	0	0	2	0
