= Thomas Adamson (master gunner) =

English master gunner

Thomas Adamson (died 1685), Master-Gunner in King Charles II's train of artillery, is noted for his 1680-publication of England's Defence, a Treatise concerning Invasion.

== Life ==
Born into Lancashire yeomanry, Adamson was educated at Kirkham Grammar School, following his great-uncle Dom Richard who, after the Dissolution of the Monasteries, was appointed Vicar of Bexley in the diocese of Rochester.

He and other family members fought at the battles of Preston and Winwick in 1648 where he gained valuable military experience. Adamson then served as a cavalryman under Lt-Col the Lord Gerard until the Restoration when he was commissioned in the Artillery Company. Promoted Captain, he was posted to the Board of Ordnance, later becoming Master-Gunner of England.

As the threat of French invasion continued throughout the seventeenth century, Adamson was tasked with updating the 16th-century treatise by Thomas Digges, Muster Master-General to Queen Elizabeth's forces in the Low Countries, compromised by being leaked to the Earl of Leicester shortly before the Spanish attempted invasion of England in 1588.

Adamson based his on this earlier work, editing and updating it with his own additions: he gave an account of ‘such stores of war and other materials as are requisite for the defence of a fort, a train of artillery, and for a magazine belonging to a field army;’ adding also a list: (1) of the ships of war, (2) of the Governors of the garrisons of England, (3) of the Lords Lieutenant and High Sheriffs of the counties on the coast; and concluding his tract with a summary of the wages paid per month to the officers and seamen in the fleet.

The Oxford Dictionary of National Biography notes that Adamson (from a recusant family) feared a French invasion could be supported by English Catholics and that he expressed the view that the people of England should take action against any such invasion, even to the point of deposing governors of garrisons where necessary. Thus, Adamson's work was in some circles construed as possibly inciting rebellion.

== See also ==
- Artillery Company
- Board of Ordnance
- Master-Gunner
