= Dave Adamson (Australian footballer) =

Australian rules footballer (1874–1914)

Bud Adamson

Personal information
- Full name: David Hastie Adamson
- Born: 14 June 1874; Carlton, Victoria
- Died: 10 October 1914 (aged 40); Beverley, Western Australia
- Original teams: Napier Imperials, Traralgon
- Debut: Round 1, 1897, South Melbourne vs. Melbourne, at Lake Oval
- Position: Follower / Defender

Playing career^{1}
Years	Club	Games (Goals)
1897–1903	South Melbourne	90 (11)
1907–1909	Albury	
- ^{1} Playing statistics correct to the end of 1903.

David Hastie "Bud" Adamson (14 June 1874 – 10 October 1914) was an Australian rules footballer who played for South Melbourne in the Victorian Football League (VFL).

== Family ==
Adamson was the second son of David Adamson (of the Victorian Railways). His older brother John Henry Adamson (1873–1937) also played for South Melbourne in both the VFA and VFL.

On 23 December 1898 he married Frances (Fanny) O'Donnell at Carlton, Victoria, who died on 21 February 1899 at Kensington, Victoria.

== Football ==
Originally from Napier Imperial, the South Melbourne junior side in the Victorian Junior Football Association and played in their 1893 premiership side. Adamson then spent 1894, 1895 and 1896, working in Traralgon with the Bank of Australasia and playing with Traralgon and was their club captain in 1895 and 1896.

Adamson played one game for South Melbourne's VFA side in 1895 and acquitted himself quite well.

Adamson was then transferred back to Melbourne with his work with the Bank of Australasia in late 1896 and was given a Valedictory by his Traralgon football and cricket teammates and colleagues prior to his departure.

Adamson was a follower and made his VFL debut with South Melbourne in the first round of their inaugural VFL season, 1897, alongside his older brother, Jack who played 3 games for South Melbourne in 1897 and 1898.

Dave captained South Melbourne in 1899 and led the club all the way to the 1899 VFL Grand Final, where he played fullback in a narrow one point loss to Fitzroy.

Unsure what club Adamson played his football at between 1904 and 1906.

Adamson transferred to Albury, NSW with his work with the Bank of Australasia, the precursor to the ANZ Bank in 1907 and commenced playing with Albury. In 1908 he captained Albury to its first premiership in the Ovens & Murray Football League.

In early 1914 Adamson transferred from Tallangatta, Victoria to Western Australia with the Bank of Australasia. He was found dead in bed at the bank's Beverley branch on 10 October 1914, from a self-inflicted gunshot wound to his temple. He suffered from depression.

== See also ==
- The Footballers' Alphabet
