= Jimmy Adamson (Scottish footballer) =

Scottish footballer

James Adamson (born c. 1927) was a Scottish professional footballer who played as a goalkeeper. Adamson was playing as a seventeen-year-old for junior side Dundee Violet when he signed for Dundee United in August 1944. Playing ten times that season, Adamson was loaned out to Brechin City the following season and was called up for military service before being released in April 1947. It is unknown where he went after this.
