= Dave Adamson (English footballer) =

English footballer

Personal information
- Full name: David Henry Adamson
- Date of birth: 7 May 1951 (age 75)
- Place of birth: Chester-le-Street, England
- Position: Defender

Senior career*
| Years | Team | Apps | (Gls) |
| 1969–1970 | Durham City | | |
| 1970–1972 | Doncaster Rovers | 28 | (0) |
| 1972–1973 | South Shields | | |
| 1975–1982 | Boston United | 209 | (30) |
| 1983–1985 | Grantham Town | 43 | (5) |
- Hatfield Main

International career
| 1979–1980 | England C | 5 | (3) |
- * Club domestic league appearances and goals

David Henry Adamson (born 7 May 1951) is an English former professional footballer who played in the Football League, as a defender between 1969 and 1985, he also made appearances for the England national C team. He made over 250 appearances and scored more than 132 goals in his career.
