= Jim Adamson =

Australian rules footballer, born 1905

Personal information
- Full name: Ronald James Adamson
- Born: 1 August 1905; Caramut, Victoria
- Died: 22 August 1991 (aged 86); Queensland
- Original team: Penshurst
- Height: 178 cm (5 ft 10 in)
- Weight: 87 kg (192 lb)
- Position: Back pocket

Playing career^{1}
Years	Club	Games (Goals)
1929–1941	North Melbourne	180 (13)

Coaching career
Years	Club	Games (W–L–D)
1940	North Melbourne	11 (2–9–0)
- ^{1} Playing statistics correct to the end of 1941.

Jim Adamson (1 August 1905 – 22 August 1991) was an Australian rules footballer who played with North Melbourne in the Victorian Football League (VFL) for over a decade.

Adamson made his debut for North Melbourne in 1929 and became a regular in the side throughout the 1930s. He was one of their most consistent and reliable performers during the insipid years of the 1930s. Hard, fast and vigorous, Adamson was known as one of the safest defenders in the game and for years has held North's back line together. He was club captain in 1937.

In 1940 he became the caretaker Captain-coach of the team when his predecessor, Len Thomas, decided to enlist after seven games into the season. In 1940 he also won North's Syd Barker Medal, and in doing so at the age of 35 became the second oldest best and fairest winner for any club in the league's history. The only player older was 36-year-old Cyril Gambetta of St Kilda.
