= Michael Adamson =

Canadian painter (born 1971)

- Born: Michael Falconer Adamson; June 30, 1971 (age 54); Toronto, Ontario
- Education: Ryerson University, Canada Emily Carr University of Art and Design, Canada Kunsthochschule Kassel, Germany
- Known for: painter, sculptor
- Spouse: Nicole Katsuras

Michael Adamson (born June 30, 1971) is a Canadian painter, photographer and curator who is primarily known for a style that blends landscape with abstraction but abstraction wins.

== Biography ==
Michael Adamson was born in Toronto and initially studied photography at Ryerson University where he became interested in photo-conceptualism. Motivated to study more closely the Vancouver School Adamson transferred to study art at the Emily Carr University of Art and Design in Vancouver where his instructors included Ian Wallace. In his third year, he studied at the Kunsthochschule Kassel, Germany where he became fascinated with Gerhard Richter, as were other painting students.

== Work ==
Adamson's breakthrough as a painter in Canada came in 1998 when he started to compose paintings in which he used grids to mirror the material of the canvas. His painterly signature is composed of discs of bright pigment applied to brilliantly hued canvas.At first influenced by modernist painters, such as Hans Hofmann and Richter, he became in time an abstract painter using ideas of landscape with horizon lines and configurations that could be read as water and skies. His work was described in the Globe and Mail as paintings that "hover...between abstraction and landscape".

At the end of the 1990s, he began to show his work in vacant properties around Toronto. These "pop-ups" were artist-run centres which presented shows of new artists. From 1998 until 2008, painting became for him an 'open country' to which he applied different approaches in composition and application. The Open Country series (2008) included 150 canvases completed over a five-month period. A later series was called Open Road.

Adamson's works have been included in shows at the Beaverbrook Art Gallery, Fredericton, New Brunswick (Goop, Guck, And Globs: The Materiality Of Paint, 2012); the Gardiner Museum, Toronto (12 Trees, 2015); Thompson's Galleries in London (2016); and the Couture Galleri in Stockholm (2016). In 2020, his solo show Abstraction in the Extended Field took place at the Art Gallery of Northumberland in Cobourg, Ontario. In 2021, a new series of paintings were exhibited in a solo exhibition at Thompson's Galleries in London, UK. In 2022, his work from John Mann's collection was shown in a solo exhibition at the 13th Street Winery in St. Catharines, Ontario.

== Selected public collections ==
- Art Gallery of Hamilton, Ontario
- Art Gallery of Nova Scotia, Halifax, Nova Scotia
- Art Gallery of Peel, Brampton, Ontario
- Beaverbrook Art Gallery, Fredericton, NB
- McIntosh Art Gallery, University of Western Ontario, London, Ontario
- Robert McLaughlin Gallery, Oshawa, Ontario
- Varley Art Gallery of Markham, Unionville, Ontario
