= Mike Adamson (baseball) =

American baseball player (1947–2022)

- Pitcher
- Born: September 13, 1947; San Diego, California, U.S.
- Died: May 7, 2022 (aged 74); Monument, Colorado, U.S.
- Batted: Right Threw: Right

MLB debut
- July 1, 1967, for the Baltimore Orioles

Last MLB appearance
- May 7, 1969, for the Baltimore Orioles

MLB statistics
- Win–loss record: 0–4
- Earned run average: 7.46
- Strikeouts: 14
- Stats at Baseball Reference

Teams
- Baltimore Orioles (1967–1969)

John Michael Adamson (September 13, 1947 – May 7, 2022) was an American professional baseball player, a right-handed pitcher who appeared in eleven Major League Baseball (MLB) games for the Baltimore Orioles. Adamson was 6 feet 2 inches (1.88 m) tall and weighed 185 pounds (84 kg).

Drafted out of the University of Southern California in the first round of the secondary phase in the 1967 Major League Baseball draft and signed to a Baltimore contract on June 27, 1967, Adamson became the first player to go straight to the Major Leagues without spending a day in the minors since the institution of the June baseball lottery in 1965. In his July 1 debut against the Cleveland Indians, Adamson hurled two innings of relief; he surrendered two hits, two earned runs, and three stolen bases, including a steal of home by Cleveland's Chuck Hinton. He would be sent to the minors after his third MLB appearance (and second start), although he would spend part of the next two seasons with the Orioles.

From his demotion in 1969 to 1971, Adamson pitched in Baltimore Orioles' minor league system. He was picked up by the Milwaukee Brewers and spent part of 1971 with the Evansville Triplets, the Brewers' AAA affiliate. In the course of his eleven-game MLB career, Adamson yielded 28 hits and 22 bases on balls, with 14 strikeouts, in 25 1/3 innings pitched. He retired after the 1971 season.

Adamson died on May 7, 2022, at the age of 74.

== See also ==
- List of baseball players who went directly to Major League Baseball
