= Skids discography =

- Studio albums: 7
- EPs: 3
- Live albums: 5
- Compilation albums: 8
- Singles: 11
- Video albums: 2

This is the discography of Scottish punk rock band Skids.

== Albums ==
=== Studio albums ===
Title	Album details	Peak chart positions	
Title	Album details	UK	UK Indie
Scared to Dance	Released: 23 February 1979; Label: Virgin; Formats: LP, MC	19	—
Days in Europa	Released: 12 October 1979; Label: Virgin; Formats: LP, MC	32	—
The Absolute Game	Released: 19 September 1980; Label: Virgin; Formats: LP, 2xLP, MC	9	—
Joy	Released: 20 November 1981; Label: Virgin; Formats: LP, MC	—	—
Burning Cities	Released: 12 January 2018; Label: No Bad; Formats: CD, 2xCD, LP, digital download	28	2
Peaceful Times	Released: 28 June 2019; Label: No Bad; Formats: CD, LP, digital download; Acoustic re-recordings of hits	— (Note: Peaceful Times did not enter the Official Albums Chart but peaked at number 33 on the Albums Sales Chart.)	9
Songs from a Haunted Ballroom	Released: 4 June 2021; Label: Cleopatra; Formats: CD, LP, digital download	— (Note: Songs from a Haunted Ballroom did not enter the Official Albums Chart but peaked at number 43 on the Albums Sales Chart.)	13
Destination Düsseldorf	Released: 30 June 2023; Label: Last Night From Glasgow; Formats: CD-R, LP, digital download	—	—
"—" denotes releases that did not chart.

=== Live albums ===
Title	Album details
BBC Radio 1 Live in Concert	Released: 1992; Label: Windsong International; Formats: CD; Recorded in March 1979 at the Paris Theatre, London
Masquerade Masquerade – The Skids Live	Released: 26 February 2007; Label: Virgin/EMI; Formats: CD; Recorded in October 1980 at the Hammersmith Apollo and in June 1979 at the Glasgow Apollo
Live in London	Released: 19 June 2017; Label: Live Here Now; Formats: 2xCD-R; Recorded in June 2017 at the Roundhouse
Skids Live Volume 1 2010	Released: 14 May 2021; Label: No Bad; Formats: CD-R; Recorded in March 2010 at the O2 ABC Glasgow
Skids Live Volume 2 – Lockdown Live	Released: 7 October 2021; Label: No Bad; Formats: CD-R; Recorded in 2021

=== Compilation albums ===
Title	Album details	Peak chart positions
Title	Album details	UK
Fanfare	Released: July 1982; Label: Virgin; Formats: LP, MC	—
Dunfermline – A Collection of the Skids' Finest Moments	Released: 1987; Label: Virgin; Formats: CD; Reissued in 1995 as Sweet Suburbia – The Best of the Skids and in 2005 as Into the Valley – The Best of the Skids	—
The Greatest Hits of Big Country and the Skids – The Best of Stuart Adamson	Released: 27 May 2002; Label: Universal Music TV; Formats: 2xCD	71
The Very Best of the Skids	Released: 28 July 2003; Label: EMI; Formats: CD	—
The Saints Are Coming – The Best of the Skids	Released: 26 February 2007; Label: Virgin/EMI; Formats: CD	—
The Singles Collection 1978–1981	Released: 23 January 2012; Label: Captain Oi!; Formats: 2xCD	—
The Virgin Years	Released: 15 November 2015; Label: Caroline International; Formats: 6xCD	—
The Saints Are Coming – Live and Acoustic 2007–2021	Released: 24 June 2022; Label: Cherry Red; Formats: 6xCD	—
"—" denotes releases that did not chart.

=== Video albums ===
Title	Album details
The Skids	Released: 1989; Label: Virgin Music Video; Formats: VHS
Live 2010	Released: October 2010; Label: No Bad Films; Formats: DVD; Australia-only release

== EPs ==
Title	EP details	Peak chart positions
Title	EP details	UK
Skids	Released: 24 February 1978; Label: No Bad; Formats: 7"; Also known by the track "Charles"	—
Wide Open	Released: 13 October 1978; Label: Virgin; Formats: 7" & 12" red vinyl.; Known for its lead track "The Saints Are Coming"	48
Skids	Released: May 1983; Label: Virgin; Formats: 12"	—
"—" denotes releases that did not chart.

== Singles ==
Title	Year	Peak chart positions		Album
Title	Year	UK	IRE	Album
"Sweet Suburbia" b/w "Open Sound"	1978	70	—	Non-album single
"Into the Valley" b/w "TV Stars"	1979	10	15	Scared to Dance
"Masquerade" b/w "Out of Town"	1979	14	6	Non-album single
"Charade" b/w "Grey Parade"	1979	31	—	Days in Europa
"Working for the Yankee Dollar" b/w "Vanguard's Crusade"	1979	20	—	Days in Europa
"Animation" b/w "Pros and Cons"	1980	56	—	Days in Europa
"Circus Games" b/w "One Decree"	1980	32	—	The Absolute Game
"Goodbye Civilian" b/w "Monkey McGuire Meets Specky Potter Behind the Lochore Institute"	1980	52	—	The Absolute Game
"Woman in Winter" b/w "Working for the Yankee Dollar" (live)	1980	49	—	The Absolute Game
"Fields" b/w "Brave Man"	1981	—	—	Joy
"Iona" b/w "Blood and Soil"	1981	—	—	Joy
"—" denotes releases that did not chart or were not released in that territory.
