= The Filthy Tongues =

Scottish band

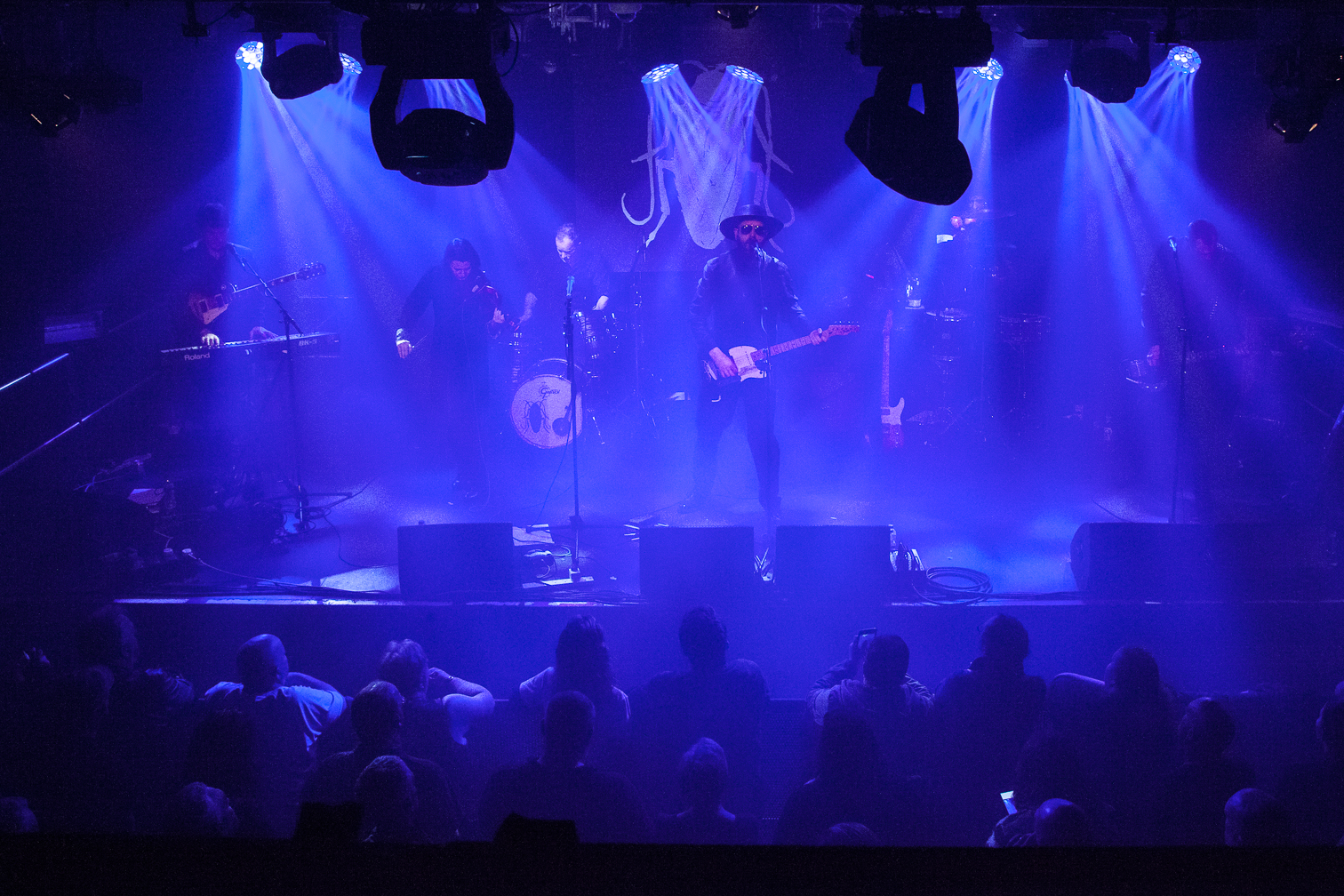

Background information
- Origin: Edinburgh, Scotland
- Genres: Alternative rock; gothic blues
- Years active: 2005–present
- Labels: Circular, Neon Tetra, Blokshok
- Members: Martin Metcalfe; Derek Kelly; Fin Wilson
- Past members: Stacey Chavis
- Website: www.filthytongues.com

The Filthy Tongues are an alternative rock group from Edinburgh, Scotland, made up of Martin Metcalfe, Fin Wilson and Derek Kelly, who were previously members of Goodbye Mr Mackenzie and Angelfish alongside Shirley Manson. As Isa & the Filthy Tongues with singer Stacey Chavis, the band released two albums. Since 2016 they have been performing with additional member Asim Rasool and, since 2018, Alex Shedlock.

== Isa & the Filthy Tongues ==
An earlier incarnation of the band, Isa & The Filthy Tongues, featured American singer-songwriter Stacey Chavis on lead vocals. Their first album, Addiction was released on Circular Records in May 2006. It was re-released in 2009.

Dark Passenger came out through Neon Tetra Records in 2010. Scotland on Sunday compared Metcalfe's performance on "Beautiful Girl" to the Sensational Alex Harvey Band.

Isa & The Filthy Tongues contributed the song "Big Star" to the film Spread, directed by fellow Scot David Mackenzie and starring Ashton Kutcher and Anne Heche. They also contributed five songs including the title track to the film New Town Killers directed by Richard Jobson, who co-wrote the song and also sings on "New Town Killers".

== Current lineup ==
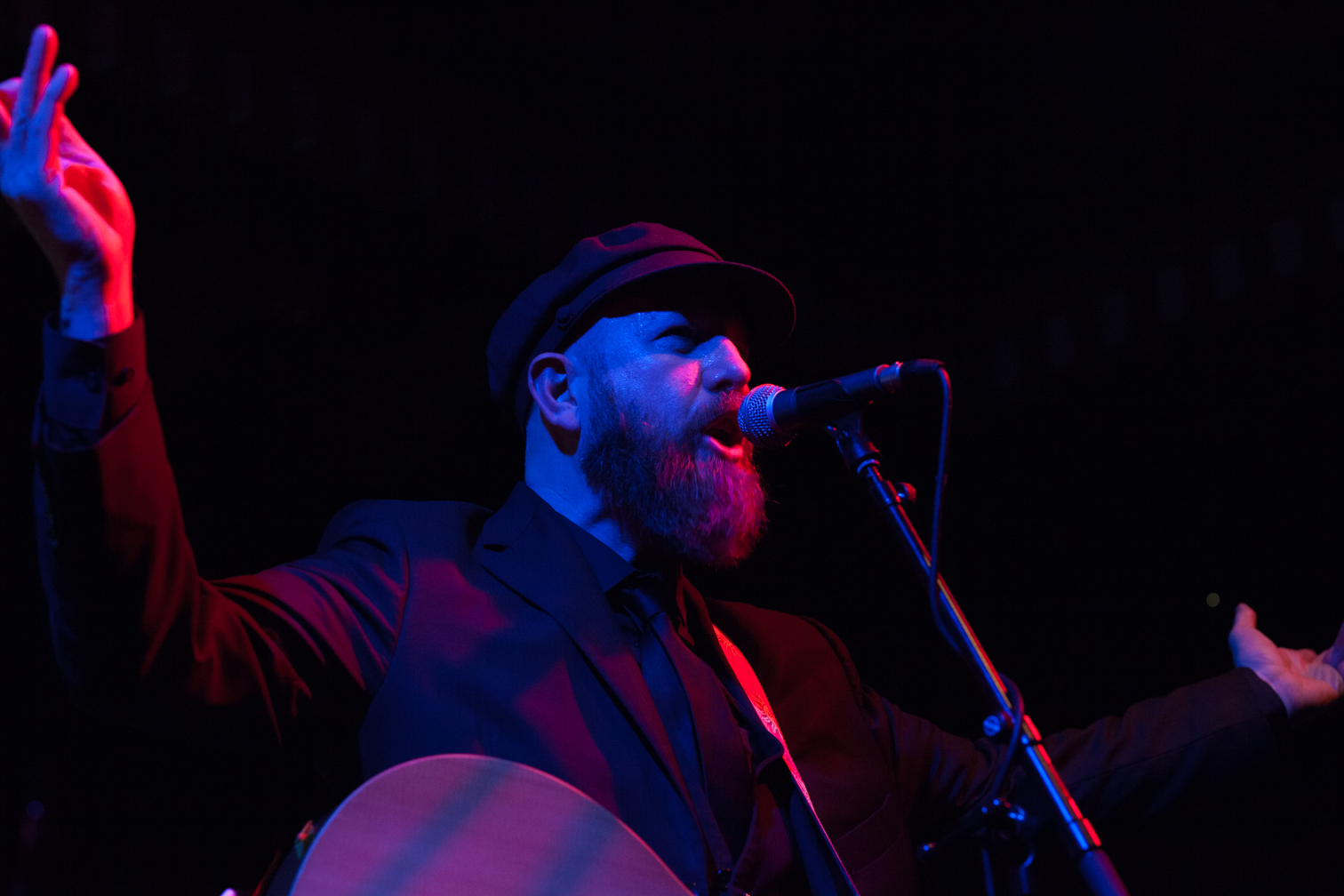
Metcalfe in 2018

In 2014, The Filthy Tongues (appearing without Chavis), released a track titled "Lethe Walks" on YouTube. This track, along with two others, was released in a special limited edition 10" vinyl, as a promo tool for Scenes a book of paintings and poetry by Martin Metcalfe and Paul Hullah.

In 2016, the Filthy Tongues released their first album Jacob's Ladder, named after a staircase cut into Calton Hill in Edinburgh. The Scotsman compared the title track with the work of Nick Cave. The Filthy Tongues toured in 2017 with the Skids, and Metcalfe and Kelly contributed to writing four songs on the 2018 Skids' album Burning Cities which reached number 28 in the charts.

Local football club Hibernian F.C. used the song "Holy Brothers" to launch their Hibernian Reborn campaign in season 2017–18. A new Filthy Tongues album entitled Back To Hell is due to be released on 21 April 2018.

== Discography ==
- Addiction (2006)
- Dark Passenger (2010)
- Jacob's Ladder (2016)
- Back to Hell (2018)
- In These Dark Places (2023)
- Damascene (The Filthy Tongues featuring Paul Hullah) (2024)
