= Days in Europa =

Studio album by Skids
- Released: 12 October 1979 (withdrawn); 7 March 1980
- Studios: Rockfield, Rockfield; Basing Street, London; The Manor, London
- Genre: New wave
- Label: Virgin
- Producer: Bill Nelson

Skids chronology
Scared to Dance (1979)	Days in Europa (1979)	The Absolute Game (1980)

Alternative cover
- Second edition album cover, 1980

Days in Europa is the second album by the Scottish punk rock and new wave band Skids. It was released in 1979 by record label Virgin.

== Reception ==
Professional ratings
Review scores
Source	Rating
AllMusic	3/5 stars
Music Week	4/4 stars
Smash Hits	8/10

Days in Europa has received a generally mixed response from critics. Ira Robbins of Trouser Press wrote: "In polishing and refining the band's sound even a little, [producer Bill Nelson] smoothed off the vital edge." The Globe and Mail noted that "the record is new wave in tone, with some heavy metal tendencies."

== Track listing ==
All tracks are written by Richard Jobson and Stuart Adamson, except "Home of the Saved", written by Adamson.

Side A
No.	Title	Length
1.	"Animation"	4:51
2.	"Charade"	3:53
3.	"'Dulce et Decorum Est (Pro Patria Mori)'"	4:08
4.	"Pros and Cons"	3:19
5.	"Home of the Saved"	5:05

Side B
No.	Title	Length
6.	"Working for the Yankee Dollar"	4:53
7.	"The Olympian"	3:32
8.	"Thanatos"	4:06
9.	"A Day in Europa"	3:01
10.	"Peaceful Times"	5:05

2001 reissue bonus tracks
No.	Title	Length
11.	"Masquerade" (non-album single A-side, 1979)	2:46
12.	"Out of Town" (1980 re-recording from The Absolute Game)	4:08
13.	"Another Emotion" ("Masquerade" single B-side, 1979)	3:00
14.	"Aftermath Dub" ("Masquerade" single B-side, 1979)	3:00
15.	"Grey Parade" ("Charade" single B-side, 1979, composed Jobson, Adamson and Nelson)	4:45
16.	"Working For the Yankee Dollar" (single A-side remix, 1979)	3:39
17.	"Vanguard's Crusade" ("Working For the Yankee Dollar" single B-side, 1979)	4:42

=== 1980 re-release ===
Side A
No.	Title	Length
1.	"Animation"	4:27
2.	"Charade"	4:00
3.	"'Dulce et Decorum Est (Pro Patria Mori)'"	4:34
4.	"The Olympian"	3:22
5.	"Home of the Saved"	4:26

Side B
No.	Title	Length
6.	"Working for the Yankee Dollar"	3:52
7.	"Thanatos"	4:02
8.	"Masquerade"	2:44
9.	"A Day in Europa"	2:56
10.	"Peaceful Times"	5:00

== Personnel ==
Skids

- Richard Jobson – vocals
- Stuart Adamson – guitar, vocals, keyboards
- William Simpson – bass guitar, vocals

Additional personnel

- Rusty Egan – drums
- Bill Nelson – keyboards
- Thomas Kellichan – drums on "Masquerade" (second version only)
