= Cowdenbeath =

Town in west Fife, Scotland

Coordinates: 56.11°N 3.35°W

Cowdenbeath: Scottish Gaelic: Cùl Dùn Beithe; Scots: Coudenbeath
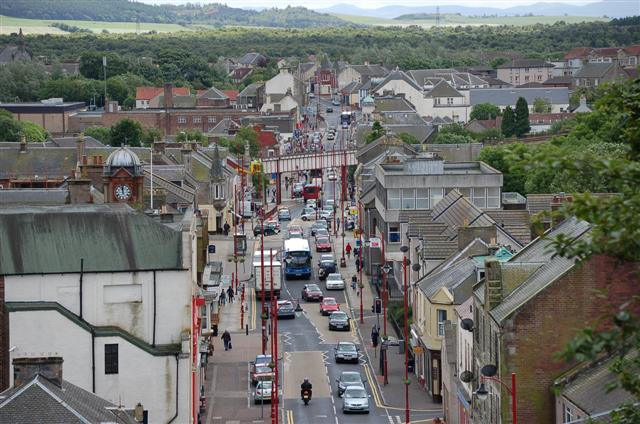
- View down Cowdenbeath High Street from the North End War Memorial

- Location within Fife
- Population: 12,030 (2020)
- OS grid reference: NT160916
- Council area: Fife
- Lieutenancy area: Fife
- Country: Scotland
- Sovereign state: United Kingdom
- Post town: COWDENBEATH
- Postcode district: KY4
- Dialling code: 01383
- Police: Scotland
- Fire: Scottish
- Ambulance: Scottish
- UK Parliament: Kirkcaldy and Cowdenbeath
- Scottish Parliament: Cowdenbeath

Cowdenbeath (/ˌkaʊdənˈbiːθ/) is a town and burgh in west Fife, Scotland. It is 5 miles (8 km) north-east of Dunfermline and 18 miles (29 km) north of the capital, Edinburgh. The town grew up around the extensive coalfields of the area and became a police burgh in 1890. According to a 2008 estimate, the town has a population of 14,081.

The wider civil parish of Beath has a population of 17,351 (in 2011).

== Toponymy ==
The first element of the town's name comes from the surname Colden or Cowden, often indicated in early forms as a possessor by the addition of -(i)s, for example Cowdennyes Baith. Beath, the name of the wider parish, is from the Gaelic beith, meaning birch.

== History ==
The earliest indication of human activity in the immediate vicinity of the current site of Cowdenbeath was provided by the discovery of late Bronze Age vessels containing incinerated human remains, in 1928. An article by eminent archaeologist A.D. Lacaille F.S.A Scot details the find of a late bronze-age cemetery near Tollie Hill. One of the urns found contained fragments of processed Arran pitchstone, indicating some economic activity and commerce.

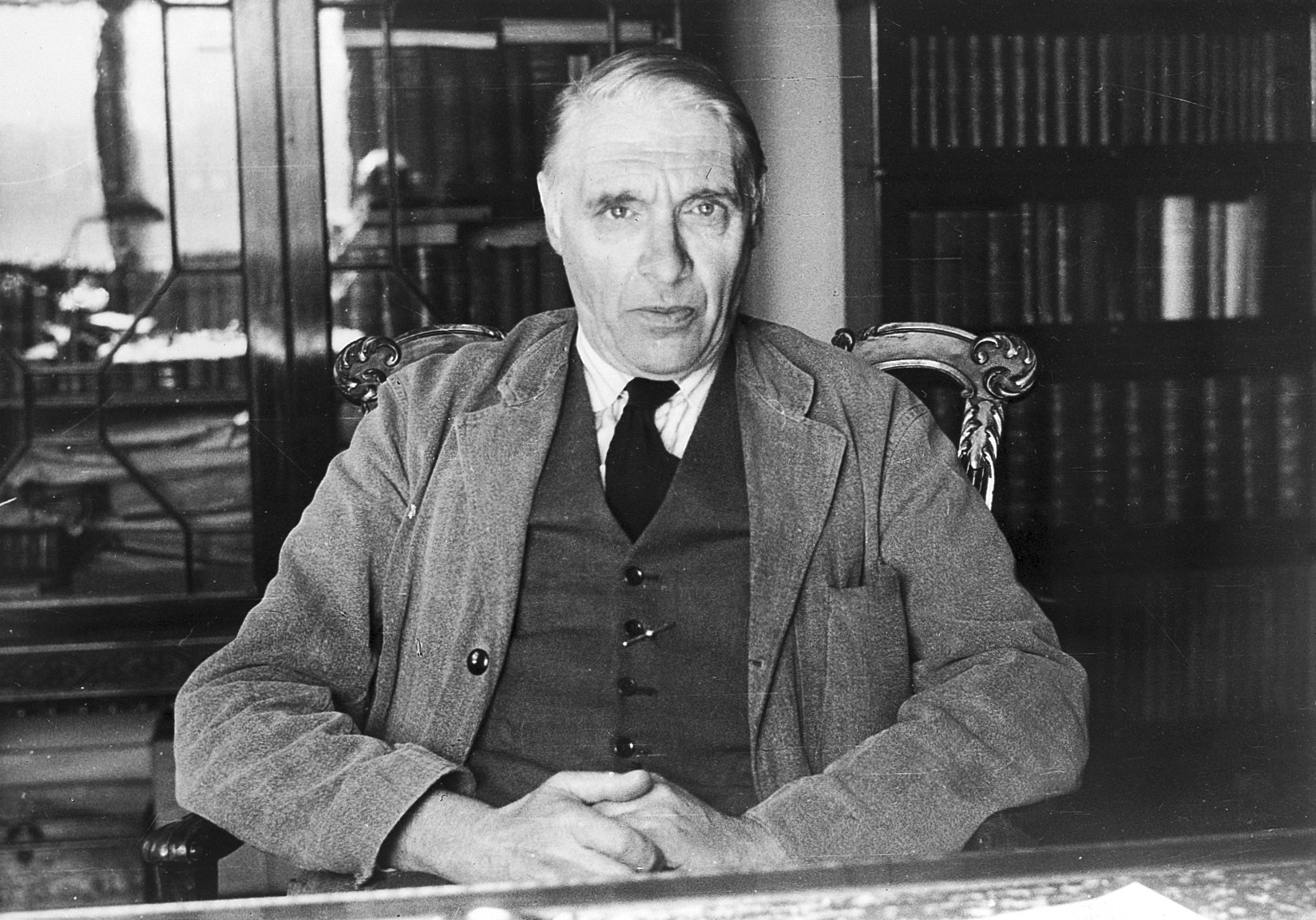
A.D. Lacaille, Archaeologist

There is no evidence of a permanent settlement establishing itself around the current site of Cowdenbeath until the designation of the original Beath Kirk as a parish church in 1429–1430 to act as a focal point to serve the surrounding area. The earliest written record of Beath (Beth) was found in a charter of Inchcolm Abbey, dated 6 March 1178. This charter makes reference to the Chapel of Beth. Although it is generally accepted that the word beath in Gaelic means "birch", P.W. Brown suggests that the word means "abode" or "a settlement". In 1643 the Reverend John Row of Carnock, a leading opponent of episcopacy, was instrumental in establishing the Parish of Beath as an entity in its own right by separating it from the parish of Dalgety Bay and Aberdour. This significant date followed the building of a new church in 1640 at Beath, to replace the ruins of a sanctuary, which had fallen into sad disrepair. The present church, visible today, was constructed in 1834–35 by James MacFarlane and was altered in 1884–1886.

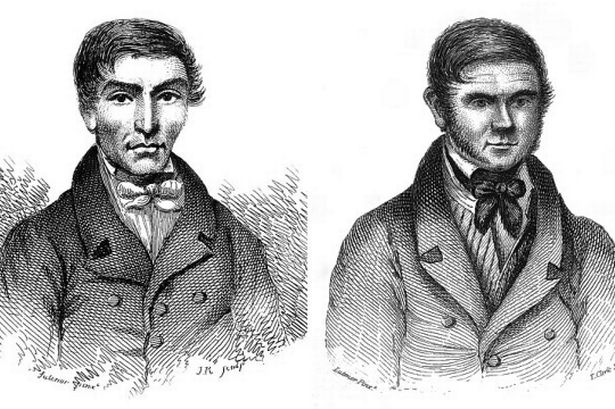
Graverobbers Hare and Burke

It is alleged that the infamous graverobbers Burke and Hare sourced some of their cadavers from Beath Cemetery, to supply to the Scottish surgeon Robert Knox for dissection. Precautions were taken at Beath Cemetery to prevent body-snatching and for many years what were taken to be two iron coffins without lids dug up from the old churchyard lay near the old hearse house. These were not actually coffins, but old-time safes that were placed over the coffin to hinder the work of the body-snatchers. Another preventative measure adopted was the placing of a large flat stone on top of the grave. This stone was very heavy and was placed on the grave and removed by means of a trestle hoist, the rope going through the stone and fastened on the underside, and it remained there until the danger of "snatching" was past. The two "safes" have since disappeared, but the flat stone is still to be seen near the church. The Blaeu Atlas of Scotland, published in 1654 by eminent 17th-century Dutch cartographer Joan Blaeu, refers to Cowden Beth in the current vicinity of Cowdenbeath.

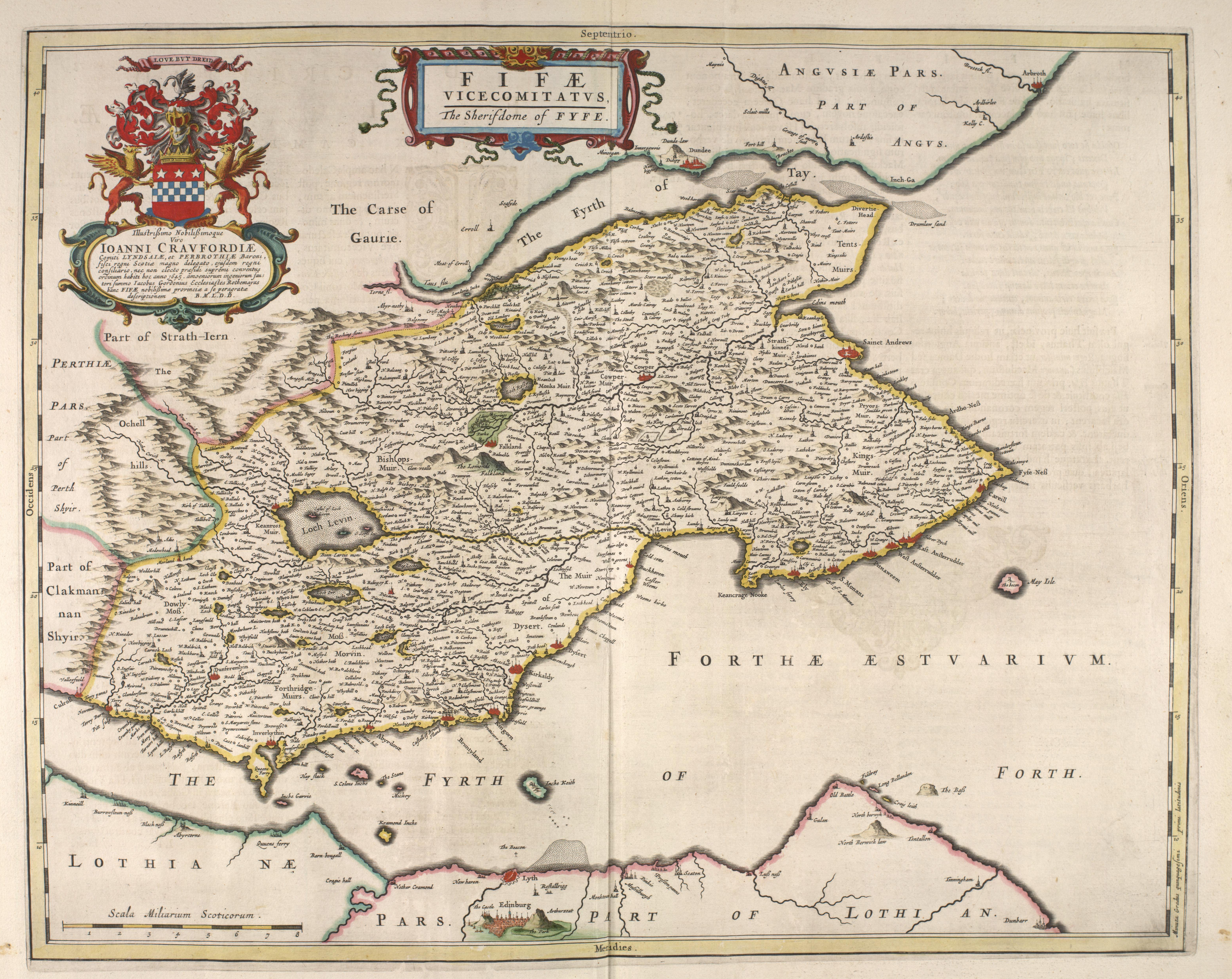
Blaeu Map of Fife by Joan Blaeu

When the actual name of Cowdenbeath came into being is not known. In 1626, the area belonged to Willielmus Walker, a citizen of Dunfermline who owned the territory of BaitheMoubray alias Cowdounes - baithe meaning Cowdens part of Beath, where Beath meant Birch Trees. However, it is thought to have originated when turnpike roads were first made and that it marked the spot of an inn and later of a tollhouse erected in the 17th century.

By 1790 the records show that the parish of Beath had about 100 families whose livelihood came mainly from the soil. The fact that Beath Church served a very large area led to the creation of many "kirke roads", roads that form rights-of-way even today. This church was replaced by the present church, built in 1832 and enlarged in 1886.

Cowdenbeath first came into prominence around 1820 as a stop on the north-bound coaching route to Perth. Indeed, Queen Victoria's entourage stopped at the Cowdenbeath Coaching Inn to change horses on her first trip to Scotland in 1842, en route for Balmoral. The coaching inn, the Old Inn, was established at the junction of roads from North Queensferry, Perth, Dunfermline and Burntisland. When the new turnpike road from Queensferry to Perth was constructed, the inn gained more importance.

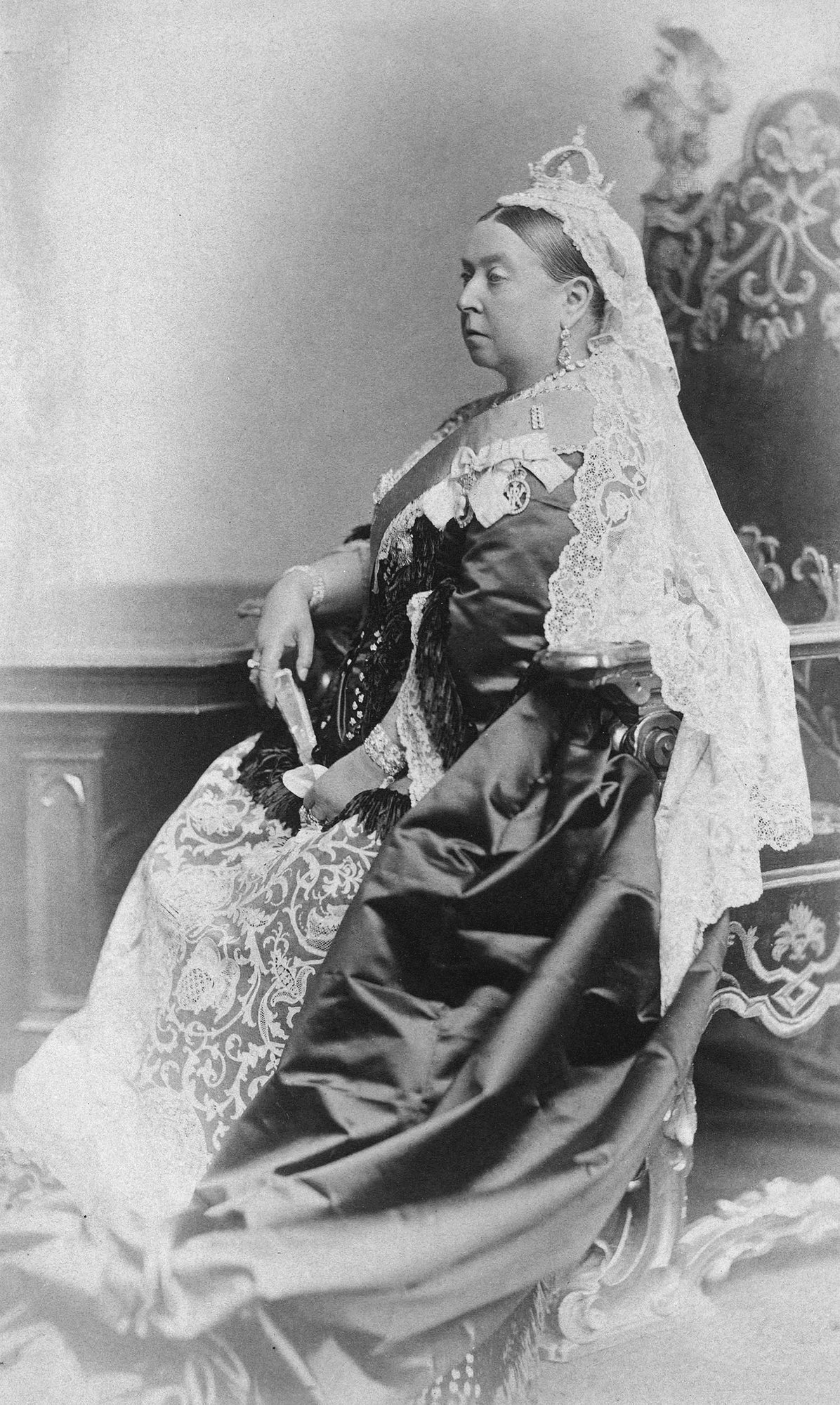
Queen Victoria stopped in Cowdenbeath en route to Balmoral

Before 1850, Cowdenbeath was just a collection of farms within the parish of Beath. The area was divided into four districts named after local farms: Kirkford, Foulford, White Threshes and Cowdenbeath farm, close to the present-day site of Central Park. Local inhabitants of these focal points of growth, which were merging into a single town, met to decide on a name for the emerging town. The eventual decision was narrowed down to either White Threshes or Cowdenbeath and Cowdenbeath was the chosen name. The arrival of the Oakley Iron Company around 1850 was to have a long-lasting impact upon Cowdenbeath and make the name synonymous with coal mining for almost 100 years. Shafts were sunk in the vicinity of the old Foulford Washer. It was in the mining for ore that the discoveries of the coal seams were made, and pits were sunk at every corner of the town. Before this, coal had been mined at Fordell for over a century, but the discovery of the coal seams at the depth they were found came as a pleasant surprise, considering the dip in the coal strata at Fordell, as it was previously thought that the seams at Cowdenbeath would be at such a depth as to be almost unworkable.

By 1850, the flourishing coal pits of Kelty, Lochgelly, Donibristle, Fordell and Hill of Beath surrounded the hamlet of Cowdenbeath. Within the greater area, which later became the Burgh of Cowdenbeath, there was little mining activity. Gibson, of Hill of Beath and the Symes, of Cartmore, had opened small pits in the vicinity of Jubilee Park at the southern border of the burgh, and other small pits appear to have been worked in the vicinity of Union Street. However, the situation was about to change when (contrary to earlier speculation) the Oakley Iron Company proved the area was rich in iron and coal. The opening of the Dunfermline–Thornton railway, via Cowdenbeath, in 1848, enhanced the prospects for mining and pits were sunk in every corner of the area, primarily for ironstone but, when this became uneconomic around the late 1870s, for coal alone.

The Forth Iron Company took over the Oakley Iron Company around 1860 then amalgamated with the Cowdenbeath Coal Company in 1872. When the Fife Coal Company subsequently took them over in 1896, the Cowdenbeath Coal Company's pits were listed as: Lumphinnans Nos. 1, 2, 7, and 11; Cowdenbeath Nos. 3, 7, and 9; Foulford No. 1 and Mossbeath. This effectively made the Fife Coal Company one of the largest coal-mining concerns in Scotland. Such was the upsurge in mining activity that the population of Cowdenbeath doubled (4,000–8,000) in the ten years between 1890 and 1900 and gave rise to the nickname "Chicago of Fife". This was a significant increase on the 1820 figure of 120.

Such was the extent of the importance of Cowdenbeath to coal mining at the turn of the century (circa 1900) that several institutions essential to mining became established there. The headquarters of the Fife and Kinross Miners' Association were opened in Victoria Street on 8 October 1910, and the first mine rescue station opened at Cowdenbeath on 4 November 1910 on Stenhouse Street, opposite Beath High School. The Central Works, Cowdenbeath, (commonly referred to as "the Workshops") were built in 1924 by the Fife Coal Company Limited in order to centralise its supervisory staff and to cope with the greater amount of manufacturing and maintenance work caused by the intensive mechanisation programme which was being introduced in its mines.

Another significant mining-related building, which reflected Cowdenbeath's growing status at the forefront of mining technology, was the establishment of the Fife Mining School in 1895. The school had humble origins, operating out of two rooms in Broad Street School, until it was transferred to the basement of Beath High School on Stenhouse Street. It was not until 1936 that Fife Mining School acquired its own custom-built building on the site of the old Woodside House on Broad Street. The new Fife Mining School was erected at a cost of £22,500, and was opened on 22 March by Ernest Brown, MP, then parliamentary secretary to the mines department. The school trained apprentices in all aspects of the mining trade; however, it did have a temporary change of use during both world wars, when it was used to train women working in the munitions industry. The mining school closed in 1976, reflecting the diminishing role of coal mining in the community.

== Geography ==
Cowdenbeath lies in south-western Fife, near the larger town of Dunfermline. The town lies in a low, undulating, arable landscape to the south-east of the Ochil Hills. Whilst for the main part Cowdenbeath is fairly level, significant portions of the town have succumbed to subsidence as a result of the network of mine shafts and tunnels underlying the town.

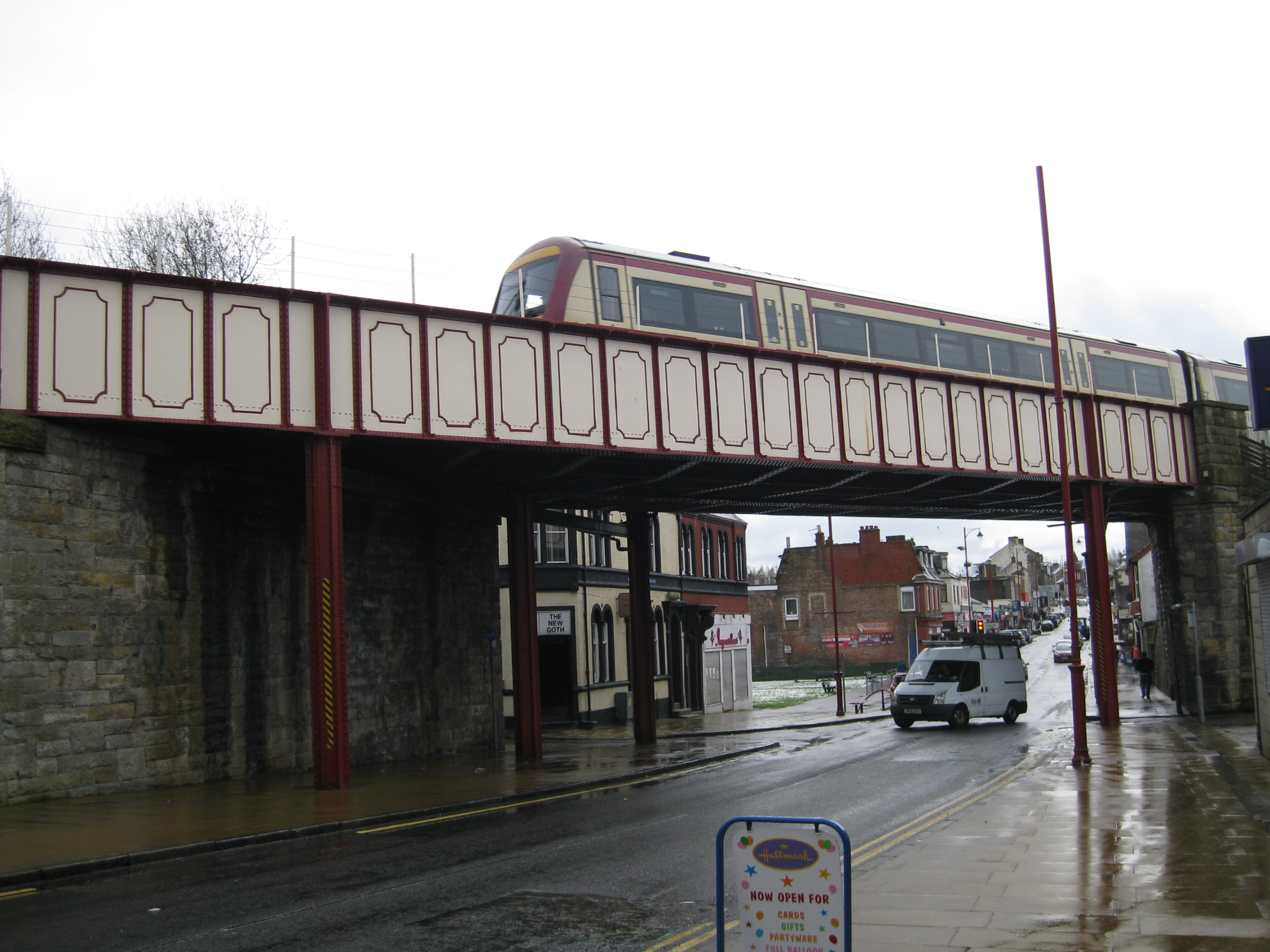
Cowdenbeath Rail Bridge

Notably, photographs of Cowdenbeath High Street circa 1900 published in Stenlake Publications show a flat High Street in which it is possible to view its entire length from north to south under the overarching railway bridge. This is impossible today, as the subsidence on the High Street has been so great that the railway bridge now obscures the view from one end to the other.

The south and eastern boundaries of Cowdenbeath are circumscribed by the A92 main road to Kirkcaldy, and beyond that the peat-bog.

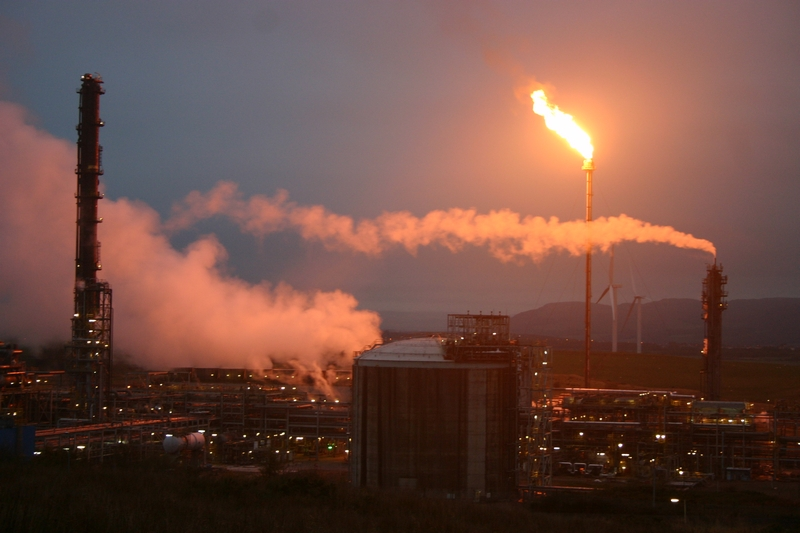
Mossmorran Petrochemical Plant

The western perimeter of Cowdenbeath merges into the neighbouring village of Hill of Beath, and is bound by the natural landscape of the gentle slopes of the hill itself, and by Loch Fitty. The proximity of the A92 to the south of Cowdenbeath, and to a lesser extent to the east, also serves to define its lower boundary.

The northern boundary of Cowdenbeath is characterised by a rural landscape, which merges into the Lochore Meadows Country Park ("The Meadies"). This formerly industrial/mining landscape, which was host to a number of pit-heads (including the Mary Pit, whose winding gear structure dominates the park as a monument to its mining legacy), is now a very picturesque area which provides leisure and recreational outdoor amenities.

== Demography ==
According to the United Kingdom Census 2011, the census locality of Cowdenbeath had a total resident population of 14,081, an increase of 21% on the 2001 census figure of 11,627. The proportional split of males to females at 48.5% to 51.5% is consistent with the proportional split by gender in both the Fife and Scottish populations.

Cowdenbeath gender-split according to UK Census 2011
	Cowdenbeath	Fife	Scotland
Total population	14,081	365,198	5,295,403
Population (male)	6,839	176,943	2,567,444
Population (female)	7,242	188,255	2,727,959

The ethnic composition of the population of Cowdenbeath is predominantly "white", accounting for 98.7% of the total population of Cowdenbeath of 14,081. The remaining 1.3% of the Cowdenbeath population comprises Asian, African, Caribbean and others. In comparison to Scotland as a whole, Cowdenbeath has a lower proportion of people of Asian and African ethnicities. The population pyramid for Cowdenbeath, derived from 2011 UK Census data exhibits a typically mature house shape, where population only really begins to taper off above the age of 75. There is a noticeable anomaly where a bulge appears in the 40 - 49 age bracket, which is representative of the baby-boomers born in the 1960s.

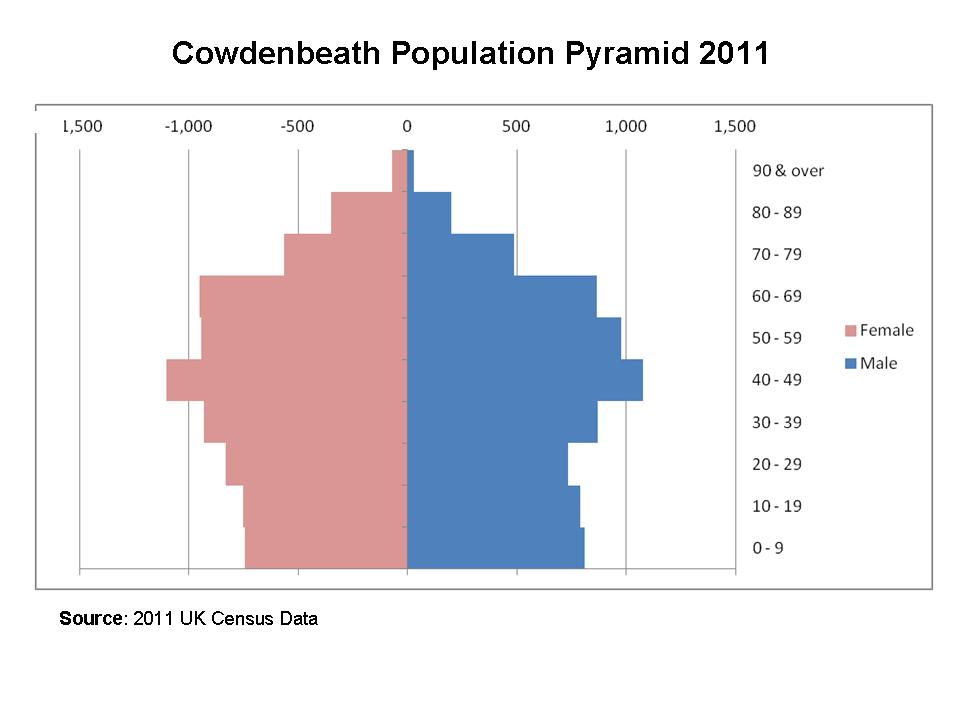
Cowdenbeath population pyramid 2011

Cowdenbeath ethnic-split according to UK Census 2011
	Cowdenbeath	Cowdenbeath (%)	Scotland	Scotland (%)
White Scottish	13,210	93.8%	4,445,678	84.0%
White British	518	3.7%	417,109	7.9%
White Irish	42	0.3%	54,090	1.0%
White Gypsy/traveller	5	0.0%	4,212	0.1%
White Polish	60	0.4%	61,201	1.2%
White other	64	0.5%	102,117	1.9%
White mixed/multiple	25	0.2%	19,815	0.4%
Asian	111	0.8%	140,678	2.7%
African	17	0.1%	29,638	0.6%
Caribbean	21	0.1%	6,540	0.1%
Other	8	0.1%	14,325	0.3%

== Sport and leisure ==
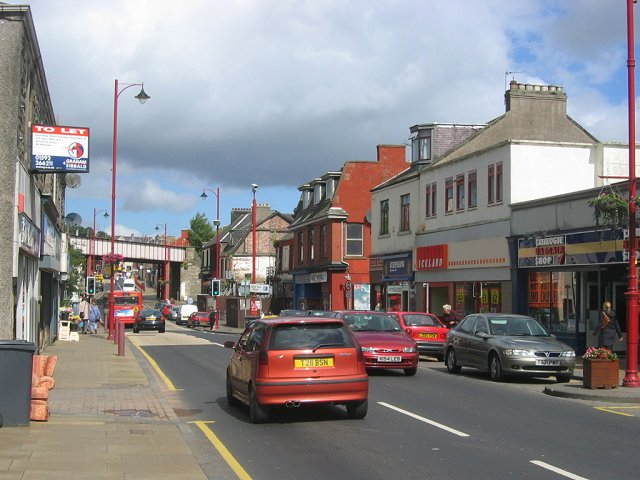
Cowdenbeath High Street (looking north)

Cowdenbeath Leisure Centre is in Pit Road, next to Central Park in the centre of the town and has a swimming pool, gym, indoor sports facilities and three all-weather pitches for football. A small skatepark is situated outside the leisure centre. There are a number of playing fields around the town.

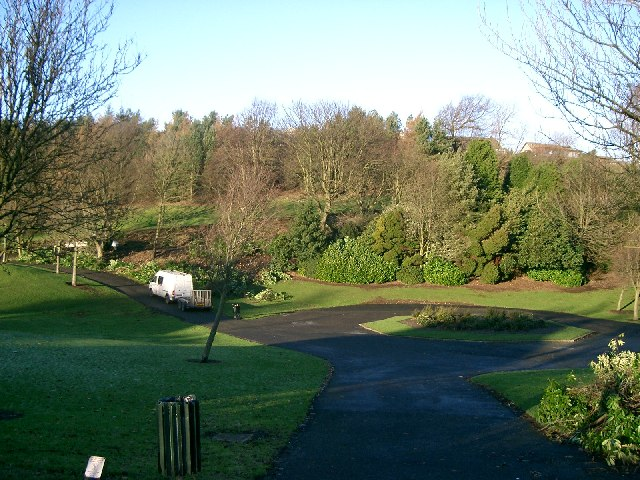
Cowdenbeath Public Park

The expansive 'Public Park' is towards the north of the town. It was established in 1910, and formally opened in 1911. The venture was largely funded by the Gothenburg Public House Society, which donated over £7,000 to the initiative.

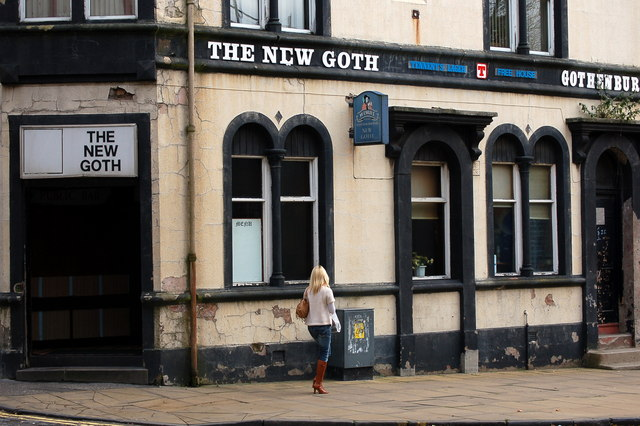
The Goth Public House (previously Gothenburg House)

In its prime the park boasted an ornate bandstand, a paddling pool, a putting course and swing park, and was a focal point for various leisure pursuits, and the venue for the annual "Store" (Co-operative Society) treat. Although most of these amenities have long since gone, the park is still tended by the local authority and provides a public open space for all to use.

Cowdenbeath also has a golf club, originally built as a nine-hole course on the old Dora Coal mine site. Work began in 1988 and the course was completed and ready for play in 1991. The length of the course was 3315 yards. The course was extended to eighteen holes and opened by Sir Michael Bonallack in 1996. The length of the course is now 6,207 yards, with a standard scratch score of 71. A new clubhouse was built and officially opened on 6 December 1998 by ex-provost James Cameron who had opened the first clubhouse. There had been a golf club at the northern end of the town before World War 2, resulting in one of the now-demolished houses being named Golf View.

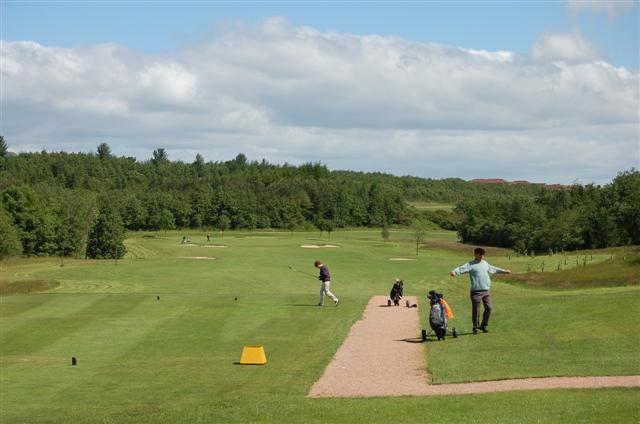
Dora Golf Course, Cowdenbeath

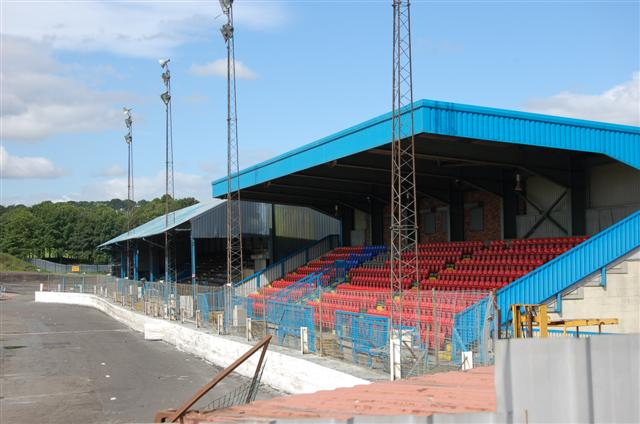
Central Park Stand

Central Park is a stadium in the centre of Cowdenbeath. It is home to Cowdenbeath F.C. and has a maximum capacity of 5,270 (1,620 covered seating). The stadium has a tarmac track encircling the football pitch, one of Britain's fastest, used for stock car racing. Central Park is the site of Britain's most northerly speedway track. The team based in Cowdenbeath were known as the Fife Lions and featured riders from Edinburgh Monarchs and Glasgow Tigers in a series of challenge matches against league teams and scratch sides. The speedway track, which staged eight meetings every year, including a world championship qualifying round, was unusual in that it featured a brick wall safety fence.

== Other amenities ==
The medical practice is situated on Stenhouse Street. There is a library situated at the north end of the High Street. The Police Station moved to former Co-op buildings at Brunton House in 2012. There is a post office near Brunton House at the south end of High Street. The red sandstone Town House building is situated towards the north end of the High Street. This sandstone is the same as that used to clad the original Beath High School (the basic structure of which was reinforced concrete) on Stenhouse street. Similar stone can be seen in the original school boundary wall, within which two minor school buildings remain and also the present care home which now occupies the site of the old high school proper.

== Education ==
There are three primary schools in the town. Cowdenbeath Primary School serves the southern end of the town. Foulford Primary School serves the northern end of the town. St Bride's Primary School, the only Roman Catholic primary, serves both the town as well as Crossgates, Hill of Beath, and Lumphinnans. Some pupils in the north-east and south-west of the town attend Lumphinnans and Hill of Beath primary schools respectively.

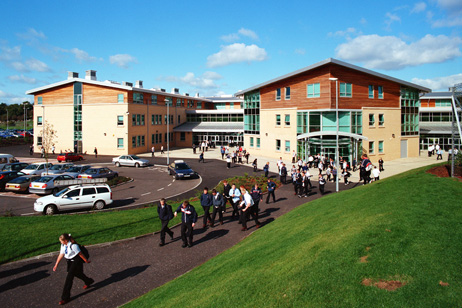
Beath High School

Cowdenbeath is also served by one secondary school. Beath High School was founded in 1910 as a grammar school, mainly for the children of local mine executives. It was an imposing building built of red sandstone and stood on Stenhouse Street. The mine works of the No.7 pit, whose original pit-head was in close proximity to the school, caused significant subsidence in latter years. A modern school was opened in 1964, built in Kirkford next to Kirk of Beath Church and cemetery. At this point the school was split, with the old building becoming the lower school, and subsequently commonly referred to as "Old Beath", whilst the modern school was referred to as "New Beath". The old building was demolished in the 1990s and in 2003 the "new" school itself was closed due to subsidence and a new public–private partnership school was built. It is maintained by Sodexo.

On 25 March 1983, Jane Cosans of Cowdenbeath changed discipline in Scottish schools. She was awarded £11,846 by the European Court of Human Rights, plus costs, as recompense for her son's suspension from Beath High School for refusing to be belted. This significantly contributed to the banning of the use of the belt in Scottish schools.

== Notable people ==
Notable people from Cowdenbeath (or who attended Beath High) include:

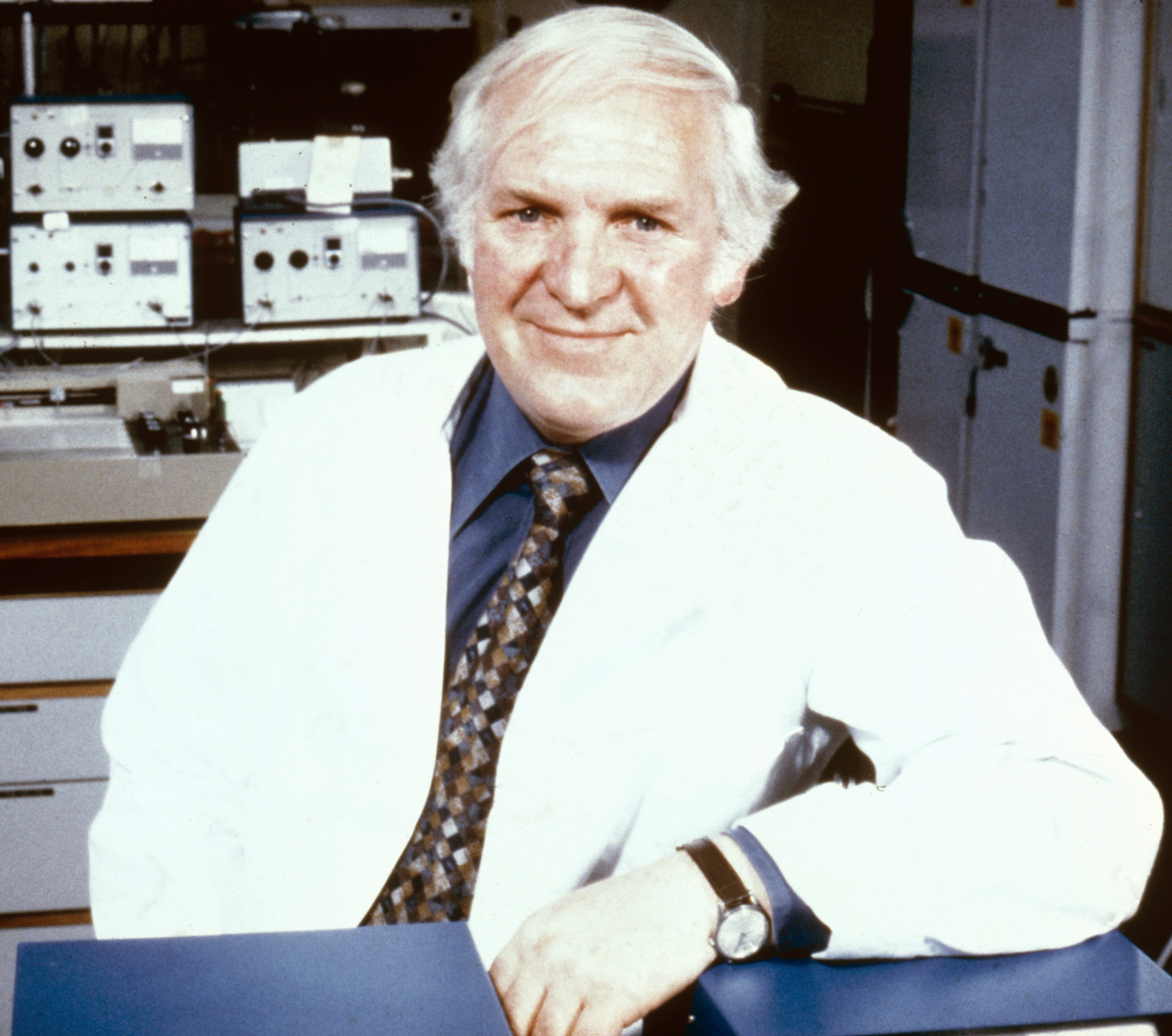
- Sir James Black (pharmacologist)
  Sir James Black (d. 2010) was a Nobel Prize winner, whose work is behind the drugs Cimetidine and propranolol. In an excerpt from his autobiography, Sir James is quoted as saying: "The imprinting mathematical influence was Dr Waterson at Beath High School, a brilliant and rumbustious teacher, who more or less man-handled me into sitting the competitive entrance examination for St. Andrews University."
- Sir Hector Hetherington (21 July 1888 – 15 January 1965) was a Scottish philosopher, who was vice-chancellor of the University of Liverpool from 1927 to 1936, and principal of the University of Glasgow until 1961.
- Jennie Lee, Baroness Lee of Asheridge, attended Beath High School. She graduated from Edinburgh University and worked as a teacher in Cowdenbeath before being adopted the ILP candidate for the North Lanarkshire constituency, which she won at a 1929 by-election, becoming the youngest member of the House of Commons. A member of Harold Wilson's government of 1964, she was influential in the creation of the Open University. Her father was manager of the Crown Hotel at the north end of the High Street, which was destroyed by fire on 13 May 2009. Her husband was Aneurin Bevan MP.
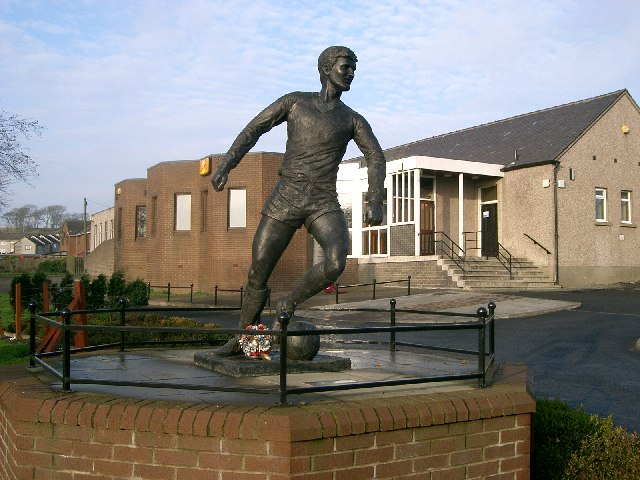
- Jim Baxter statue Hill Of Beath
  James Curran Baxter, or "Slim Jim" Baxter, was another noteworthy student of Beath High. He was one of Scotland's most prolific football players. A statue commemorating Jim Baxter can be found in adjacent Hill of Beath, his home village, outside the working men's club.
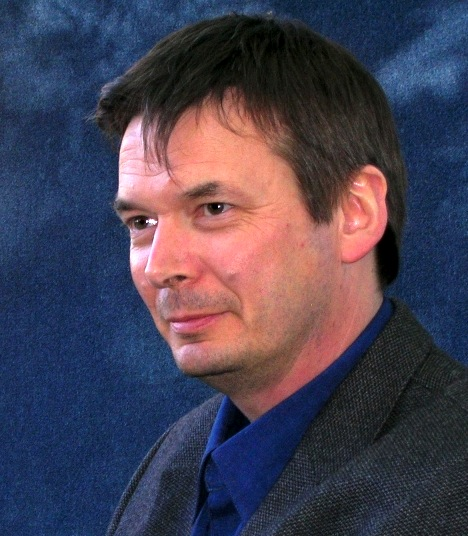
- Ian Rankin (novelist)
  Ian Rankin, the author of the Inspector Rebus novels, also attended Beath High School.
- Dennis Canavan, the Scottish politician and Member of Parliament for Falkirk West, was born in Cowdenbeath in 1942 and attended St Brides Primary School.
- Tom Gourdie, 1913–2005, calligrapher and artist, was born and raised in Cowdenbeath.
- Harry Ewing, Baron Ewing of Kirkford, was born in Cowdenbeath in 1931. The son of miner William Ewing, Harry served as a Member of Parliament for 21 years before being made a life peer.
- Donald Findlay, born in Cowdenbeath on 17 March 1951, is a well-known senior advocate and Queen's Counsel in Scotland. He has also held positions as a vice-chairman of Rangers Football Club and was twice rector of the University of St Andrews. He is now the chairman of Cowdenbeath FC.
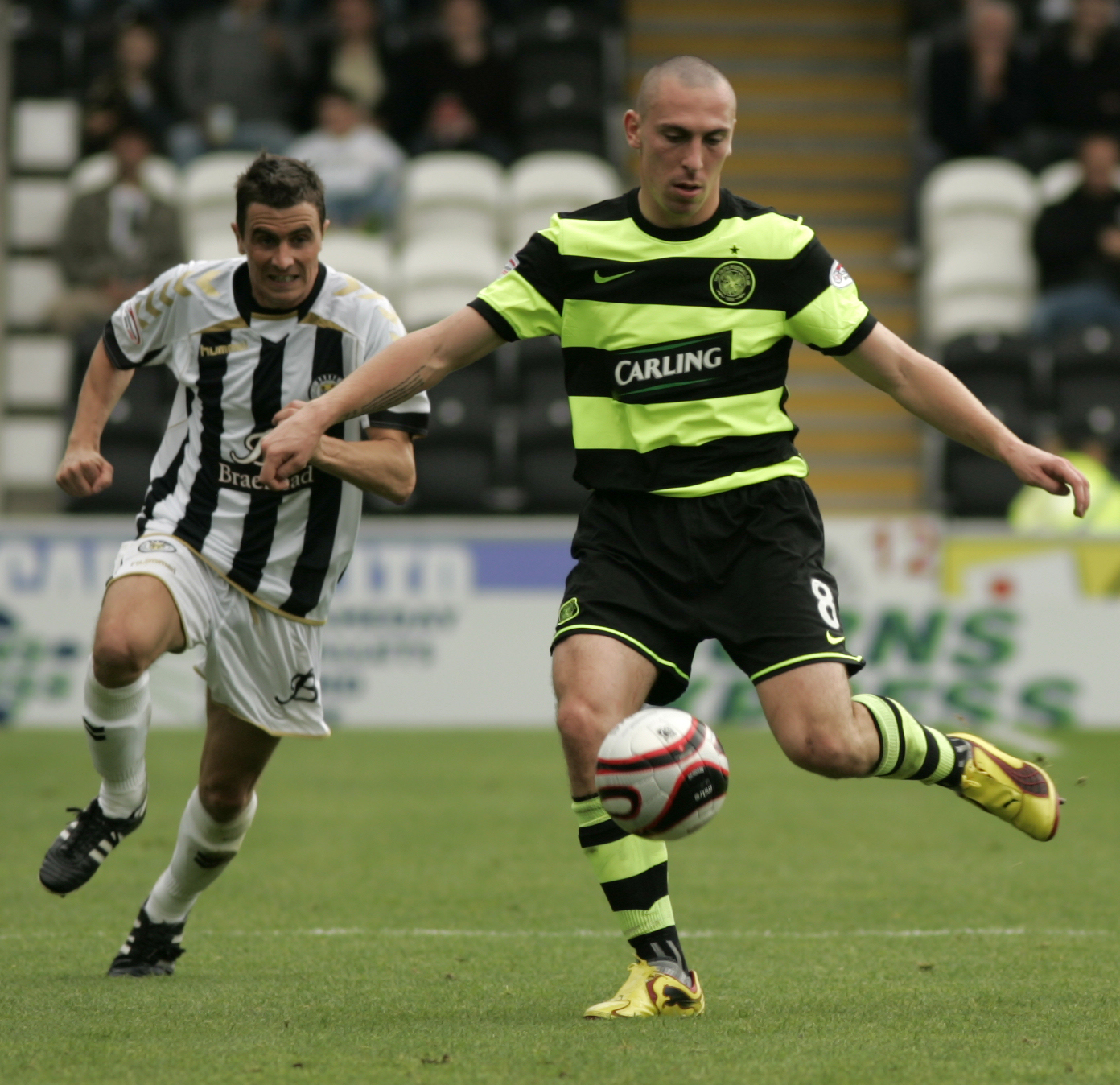
- Scott Brown (footballer)
  Scott Brown attended Beath High School. He was born in Dunfermline on 25 June 1985 and has played for Hibernian, Celtic, Aberdeen and Scotland.
- Tom Kellichan, drummer of punk rock band The Skids from 1977 to 1980, lived there.
- Tricia Marwick, politician and Presiding Officer of the Scottish Parliament
- William McLaren (1923–1987), illustrator, whose works appeared in Radio Times and The Listener, amongst other publications, attended Beath High School.
- Mary Docherty, an organizer with the Communist Party of Great Britain, was from Cowdenbeath.
- Alistair Campbell Murray (1895-1957) Director of Scottish Equitable.
- Joe Temperley (1929-2016) Jazz Saxophonist known for being a member of the Jazz at Lincoln Center Orchestra & Mercer Ellington Big Band.

== Transport ==
The A92 Fife Regional Road is a motorway-standard dual carriageway road running from the M90 motorway (which runs from Edinburgh to Perth) in Dunfermline to Kirkcaldy (and further to Glenrothes, Dundee and Aberdeen). The A92 bypasses the east of the town with a junction at Bridge Street.

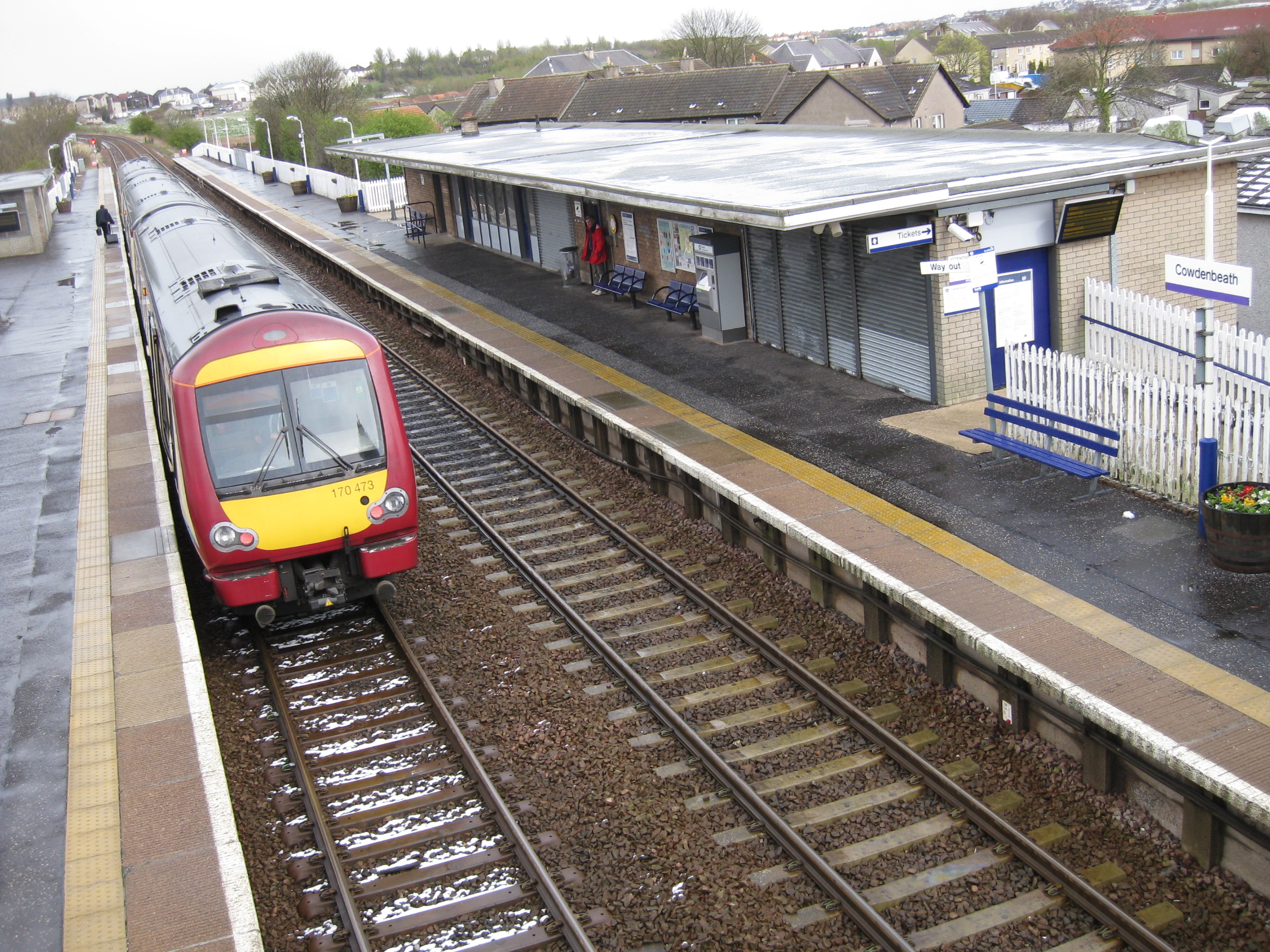
Cowdenbeath Rail Station

Cowdenbeath railway station is just off the High Street, via a steep ramp to/from each platform. It is on the Fife Circle Line with a half-hourly service to Edinburgh (Monday to Saturday daytimes).

The nearby Halbeath Park & Ride, opened in 2014, allows for onward travel to Edinburgh, Edinburgh Airport, and Glasgow.

=== Bus services ===
Service	Destination	Via	Frequency
17	Kelty	Leuchatsbeath Drive	Every hour (daytime only)
17	Halbeath Park & Ride	Church Street, Mossgreen, Crossgates	Every hour (daytime only)
17A	Kelty	Stenhouse Street, Foulford Road, Leuchatsbeath Drive	Every hour (evenings and Sundays only)
17A	Greenbank Drive	Broad Street, Moss-Side Road	Every hour (evenings and Sundays only)
17B	Kelty	Stenhouse Street, Foulford Road, Leuchatsbeath Drive	Every hour (daytime only)
17B	Barclay Street	Broad Street, Selkirk Avenue, Rae Street, Greenbank Drive	Every hour (daytime only)
18	Kelty	Leuchatsbeath Drive	Every hour
18	Leven	Auchtertool, Kirkcaldy	Every hour
19	Rosyth	Hill of Beath, Crossgates, Halbeath Park & Ride, Dunfermline	Every 10 minutes
19	Ballingry	Lumphinnans, Lochgelly, Crosshill	Every 10 minutes
33	Dunfermline	Hill of Beath, Crossgates, Halbeath, QM Hospital	Every hour
33	Kirkcaldy	Lumphinnans, Lochgelly, Cardenden	Every hour
81	Queen Margaret Hospital	Stenhouse Street, Kingseat	Every hour
81	Glenrothes	Lumphinnans, Lochgelly, Crosshill, Ballingry, Kinglassie	Every hour
X54	Edinburgh	Halbeath Park & Ride, Dunfermline, Rosyth, Ferrytoll Park & Ride	Every hour
X54	Dundee	Glenrothes, Ladybank, Newport-on-Tay	Every hour
