= 16 Years of Alcohol =

- Directed by: Richard Jobson
- Written by: Richard Jobson
- Produced by: Hamish McAlpine
- Starring: Kevin McKidd; Iain De Caestecker; Susan Lynch; Ewen Bremner; Laura Fraser; Allison McKenzie
- Music by: Keith Atack (score)
- Distributed by: Metro Tartan
- Release date: 14 August 2003
- Running time: 102 minutes
- Country: Scotland
- Language: English

16 Years of Alcohol is a 2003 drama film written and directed by Richard Jobson, based on his semi-autobiographical 1987 novel. Kevin McKidd stars as Frankie, a violent alcoholic who is partially based on Jobson and his brother.

== Plot ==
The opening scene shows Frankie being beaten by a small group of men, and the rest of the film is shown as a flashback leading up to that point. The film is split into three sections: Frankie's troubled childhood, his violent adolescence as a ska-loving skinhead who commands a small gang, and a period of change, in which Frankie tries to believe in hope and love.

Frankie starts a relationship with Helen (Laura Fraser), a young woman who studies art and works in a record store. When the differences between them became too obvious, Helen breaks up with Frankie, and he joins Alcoholics Anonymous (or a similar program) and a theatre group along with Mary (Susan Lynch), a good-hearted alcoholic. This allows Frankie to exorcise some of his demons, and he loses his desire to fight. An incident in a pub leads Frankie to believe that Mary is cheating on him with the theatre group's director. This reignites doubts created by his parents a long time ago. Feeling deceived, Frankie rejects Mary without a valid reason. When he is preparing to drink a glass of scotch, he begins to muse how the past has destroyed his life up to this point and he decides to stay sober and call Mary to apologise. The events merge with the beginning of the film, and Frankie's former comrades chase and beat him up. Whether Frankie dies or not is left open to the viewer.

== Production ==
The film is Jobson's first directorial effort, following a career as a television presenter on BSkyB and VH-1, and as the vocalist for the 1970s punk rock band The Skids. At the 2003 British Independent Film Awards, the film was nominated for best independent film, and Susan Lynch won the best supporting actor/actress category.

The movie was set and filmed in Edinburgh and Aberdour. The soundtrack features 1960s ska and skinhead reggae acts such as Desmond Dekker and Claudette and the Corporation, as well as 1970s rock bands such as Roxy Music, Velvet Underground, Iggy & The Stooges and The Skids.

== Reception ==
On Rotten Tomatoes the film has an approval rating of 80% based on reviews from 15 critics.
