= Burning Cities =

Studio album by Skids
- Released: 12 January 2018
- Studio: Meridian Studios
- Length: 44:02
- Label: No Bad Records
- Producer: Youth

Skids chronology
Joy (1981)	Burning Cities (2018)

Professional ratings
Aggregate scores
Source	Rating
Metacritic	64/100
Review scores
Source	Rating
Classic Rock	2.5/5 stars
Cryptic Rock	4/5 stars
The Daily Mirror	4/5 stars
Record Collector	3/5 stars
Uncut	7/10
The Herald	3.5/5 stars

Burning Cities is the fifth studio album by Scottish punk rock and new wave band Skids, released on 12 January 2018. Produced by Killing Joke bassist Youth, this is the band's first studio album in 36 years, since the release of Joy in November 1981. It is their first album to feature Big Country father-and-son guitarists, Bruce and Jamie Watson, the second with drummer Mike Baillie, and third with founding bassist William Simpson. Tracks 5, 7, 9 and 11 are co-written by Martin Metcalfe. The album reached number 28 in the charts. It is also the first album not to feature any contribution from former guitarist Stuart Adamson, who died in 2001.

== Track listing ==
No.	Title	Length
1.	"This Is Our World"	4:28
2.	"One Last Chance"	3:11
3.	"Kaputt"	3:55
4.	"A World On Fire"	4:23
5.	"Burning Cities"	3:45
6.	"Up On the Moors"	3:33
7.	"Refugee"	4:47
8.	"Subbotnik"	4:47
9.	"Kings of the New World Order"	4:02
10.	"Into the Void"	2:39
11.	"Desert Dust"	4:32

== Personnel ==
Skids

- Richard Jobson – lead vocals
- Bruce Watson – guitars
- Jamie Watson – guitars
- William Simpson – bass
- Mike Baillie – drums

Additional personnel

- Youth — guitars, backing vocals, bass
- Martin Metcalfe — guitars, backing vocals
- Derek Kelly – vibraphone, piano
- Susannah Clarke – violin
- Nick Turner – saxophone
- Michael Randall – keyboards, programming
- Jamie Grashion – keyboards, programming
- Rory Cowleson – keyboards (tracks 1, 2, 4)

== Charts ==
Chart (2018)	Peak position
Scottish Albums (OCC)	4
UK Albums (OCC)	28
