= Paul Hullah =

English writer

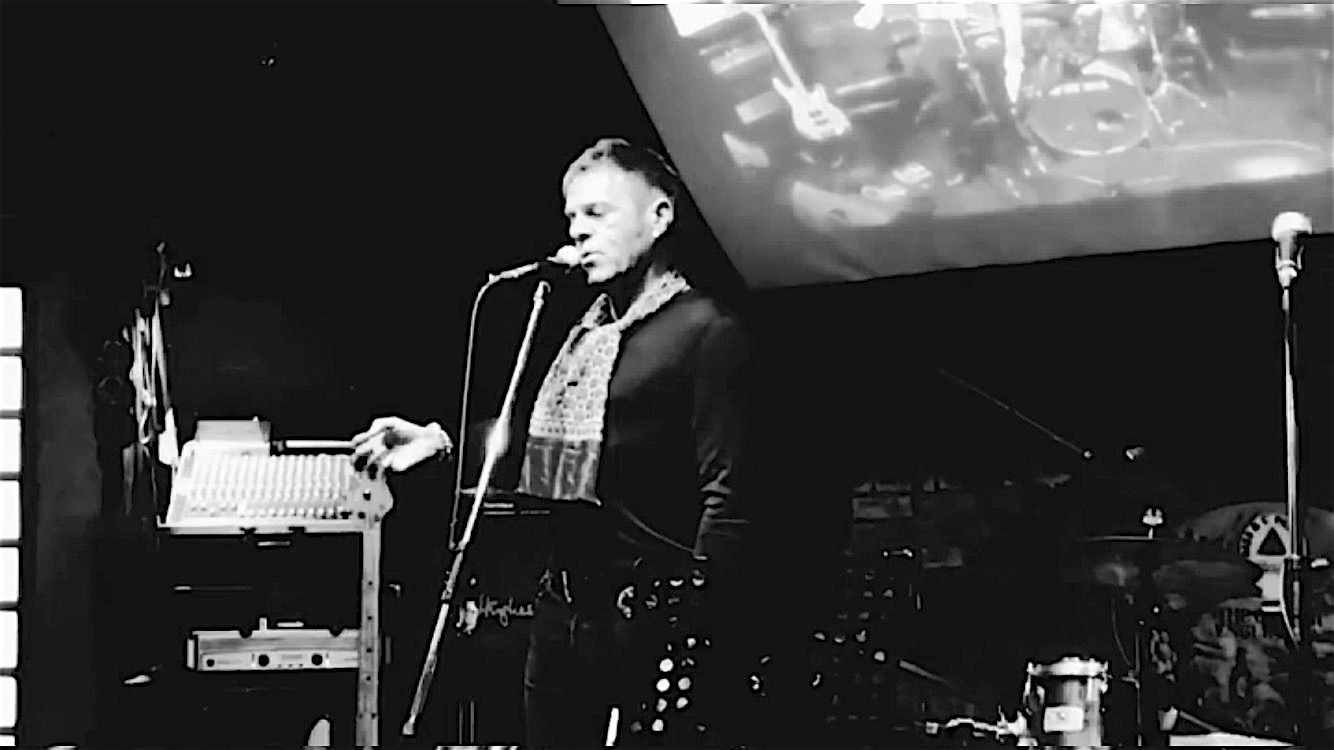
Paul Hullah performing in Tokyo, 2017.

Paul William Hullah is an English writer who has published several volumes of poetry, short stories, and literary criticism, as well as a series of literature-based EFL textbooks for university students in Japan and articles in several academic journals in the field of EFL. He was co-editor of the 1997 authorized international edition of the collected poetry of the major novelist Dame Iris Murdoch. He had also co-edited, in 1996, Playback and talk show: new Edinburgh crimes, by Ian Rankin, the first book of Inspector Rebus stories to be published in Japan. In 2016, he published the critical monograph "We Found Her Hidden: The Remarkable Poetry of Christina Rossetti".

Hullah was born in Ripon, North Yorkshire, and now lives in Japan. He attended Ripon Grammar School, and then lived and worked for over a decade as a music and arts journalist in Edinburgh, Scotland, while achieving an M.A. (in English Language and Literature) and a Ph.D. (the poetry of Christina Rossetti) from the University of Edinburgh. Hullah was an active figure in the Edinburgh underground arts and music scene during the 1980s; one of his many commercially unsuccessful bands was Teenage Dog Orgy. He moved to Japan in 1992 and is currently Associate Professor of British Literature (Poetry) at Meiji Gakuin University, Tokyo. In 2013 he received the Asia Pacific Brand Laureate International Personality Award for ‘paramount contribution to the cultivation of literature [that has] exceptionally restored the appreciation of poetry and contributed to the literary education of students in Asia.’

== Writing ==
And Here's What You Could Have Won, Hullah's first book-length collection of poetry, attracted critical praise, with reviewers variously noting echoes of W. S. Graham, John Ashbery and Christina Rossetti (about whom Hullah has published several critical essays) in the layered lyrical pieces. His second collection, Let Me Sing My Song (Dionysia, 2000) contained more confessional poetry, though retaining the wit and collisions of imagery of earlier work. Unquenched, a slim volume of haiku in English, illustrated by the Scottish artist Susan Mowatt, was published by Afterdays Press, Scotland, in 2002. Age's Bullets was published in 2006 by Vagabond Press, Sydney, Australia. In August 2011, Word Power Books UK published Homing, a selection of 24 poems by Hullah dealing with loss and recovery, illustrated by Susan Mowatt. Homing was performed as a multi-media piece, featuring music by Davy Henderson and translations by Hidetoshi Tomiyama, during 2012 in Tokyo, Kyoto, and Edinburgh. Scenes: Words, Pictures, and Music, a collaboration with the painter and musician Martin Metcalfe (formerly of Goodbye Mr Mackenzie) featuring poems by Hullah, was published by Word Power Books UK in August 2014. His latest collection, Climbable was published by Partridge Books in 2016.

== Music ==
Hullah was also a very active musician during his time at Edinburgh University and afterwards. He was a key member of several outfits in the Edinburgh underground scene including Kitsch and the Night Set, a two-piece synth group in the style of Soft Cell. Hullah was also involved with Edinburgh 'supergroup' Teenage Dog Orgy. Hullah sang for this outfit and composed lyrics. The band were formed out of Edinburgh's Indie art rock circuit and comprised Hullah, Billy Gould and Gordon Mackenzie on bass & drums (The Calloways), and Martin Metcalfe on guitar (Goodbye Mr Mackenzie).

In 2014 he released Scenes, a limited edition vinyl album, and in 2024 a sequel Damascene, both in collaboration with Martin Metcalfe and The Filthy Tongues, with whom he continues to record and play live. He has also collaborated and often performs live with Japanese avant-garde pop band Tenniscoats.

== Bibliography ==
- Playback and talk show: new Edinburgh crimes, by Ian Rankin, ed. with Y. Muroya (Kenkyusha: Tokyo, 1996) ISBN 4-327-42132-4
- Poems by Iris Murdoch, ed. with Y. Muroya (University Education Press: Okayama, 1997) ISBN 4-88730-203-7
- And Here’s What You Could Have Won, (Dionysia: Edinburgh, 1997) ISBN 0-9522341-2-2
- Passports to Comprehension (Textbook), ed. with Y. Muroya (University Education Press: Okayama, 1998) ISBN 4-88730-261-4
- Occasional Essays by Iris Murdoch, ed. with Y. Muroya (University Education Press: Okayama, 1998) ISBN 4-88730-251-7
- Romanticism and Wild Places, Essays in Memory of Paul Edwards, (Quadriga: Edinburgh, 1998) ISBN 1-85933-008-8
- More Passports to Comprehension (Textbook), ed. with Y. Muroya (University Education Press: Okayama, 1999) ISBN 4-88730-312-2
- Let Me Sing My Song, (Dionysia: Edinburgh, 2000) ISBN 1-903171-01-6
- Songs of Ourselves (EFL Textbook), (University Education Press: Okayama, 2002) ISBN 4-88730-469-2
- Unquenched, (Afterdays Press: Scotland, UK, 2002) ISBN 4-88730-312-2
- A Choice of British Poetry, edited with P. Robinson, et al., (Saytosha Press: Tokyo, 2003) ISBN 4-921209-11-1
- "Britain Today: Old Certainties, New Contradictions", (Cengage: Tokyo, 2009) ISBN 4-86312-110-5
- Homing, (Word Power Books: Scotland, UK, 2011) ISBN 0-9566283-2-X
- "Rock UK, A Cultural History of Popular Music in Britain", (Cengage: Tokyo, 2012) ISBN 978-4-86312-204-8
- Scenes: Words, Pictures, and Music, with Martin Metcalfe (Word Power Books: Scotland, UK, 2014) ISBN 0992739233
- "Climbable: Poems by Paul Hullah" (Partridge Books: UK, 2016) ISBN 9781482865752
- "We Found Her Hidden: The Remarkable Poetry of Christina Rossetti" (Partridge Books: UK, 2016) ISBN 9781482865783

== Journal publications ==
- Hullah, P. (July 1996). "'The Fire Has Died Out?' : Christina Rossetti'S Devotional Poetry (I)". Journal of the Faculty of Letters, Okayama University. 25. ISSN 0285-4864.
- Hullah, P. (December 1996). "'Wearied of self, I turn, my God, to Thee...' : Christina Rossetti'S Devotional Poetry (II)". Journal of the Faculty of Letters, Okayama University. 26: 153–167. ISSN 0285-4864.
- Hullah, P. (July 1997). "A Search for Stability : A Reading of Dante's Vita Nuova". Journal of the Faculty of Letters, Okayama University. 27: 237–243. ISSN 0285-4864.
- Hullah, P. (December 1997). "'Calling All into Doubt' : Art, Life, and Identity in IrisMurdoch's 'Not Highly Regarded' The Italian Girl". Memoirs of the Faculty of Education and Culture, Miyazaki University. Humanities. 15: 9–15. ISSN 1345-4005.
- Hullah, P. (December 1997). "Musician among the Images : Reading the Lyrics of Steven Kilbey". Journal of the Faculty of Letters, Okayama University. 28: 159–169. ISSN 0285-4864.
- Hullah, P. (July 1998). "'What can it mean ? ' : Christina Rossetti's 'My Dream'". Journal of the Faculty of Letters, Okayama University. 29: 137–142. ISSN 0285-4864.
- Hullah, P. (December 1998). "'Give me my fee...' : Christina Rossetti's Milkmaids". Journal of the Faculty of Letters, Okayama University. 30: 225–231. ISSN 0285-4864.
- Hullah, P. (December 2000). "Biblical Recontextualisation in Christina Rossetti's Monna Innominata". Journal of the Faculty of Letters, Okayama University. 34 (December): 199–206. ISSN 0285-4864.
- Hullah, P. (September 2003). "L2 Learner Attitudes to EFL Textbooks". The Language Teacher. 27 (9): 13–17.
- Hullah, P. (August 2004). "Course book choices; a rebuttal to Simon Cole". The Language Teacher. 28 (8): 26.
- Hullah, P. (2005). "My Alchemist' : Another Archetype Reworked in Christina Rossetti's The Prince's Progress". Memoirs of the Faculty of Education and Culture, Miyazaki University. Humanities. 13: 45–52. ISSN 1345-4005.
