= Tom Kellichan =

Scotting drummer

- Also known as: Thomas Kellichan, Tom Bomb, Thomas, Tam Kellichan
- Born: Thomas Kellichan c. 1954
- Origin: Cowdenbeath, Fife, Scotland
- Genres: Punk rock, new wave
- Occupations: Musician, impresario
- Instrument: Drums
- Years active: 1977–present

Tom Kellichan (born c. 1954) was the original drummer of Skids, from 1977 to 1979.

== Biography ==
From Cowdenbeath, and a former van driver, he completed the line-up of Skids after answering their ad for a drummer. During his tenure the band released the singles Charles (as Thomas) and Into the Valley, the Wide Open EP (which featured The Saints Are Coming) and the Scared to Dance album. After touring with the band in 1979, promoting Scared to Dance, he departed, being replaced by Rusty Egan.

After Skids, he played drums for Bill Nelson (of Be-Bop Deluxe), in the song "Decline and Fall", for the Quit Dreaming and Get on the Beam album (1981). He later played in a band called Secrets.

He spent a number of years running a music bar, called "The Sax Bar", in The Patch, Playa de las Américas, Tenerife,

== Discography ==
=== The Skids ===
- Charles EP (No Bad, 1977)
- Wide Open EP (Virgin, 1978)
- Scared To Dance album (1979)

=== Bill Nelson ===
- Quit Dreaming And Get On The Beam (1981)
