= Stuart Adamson =

Scottish guitarist and singer (1958–2001)

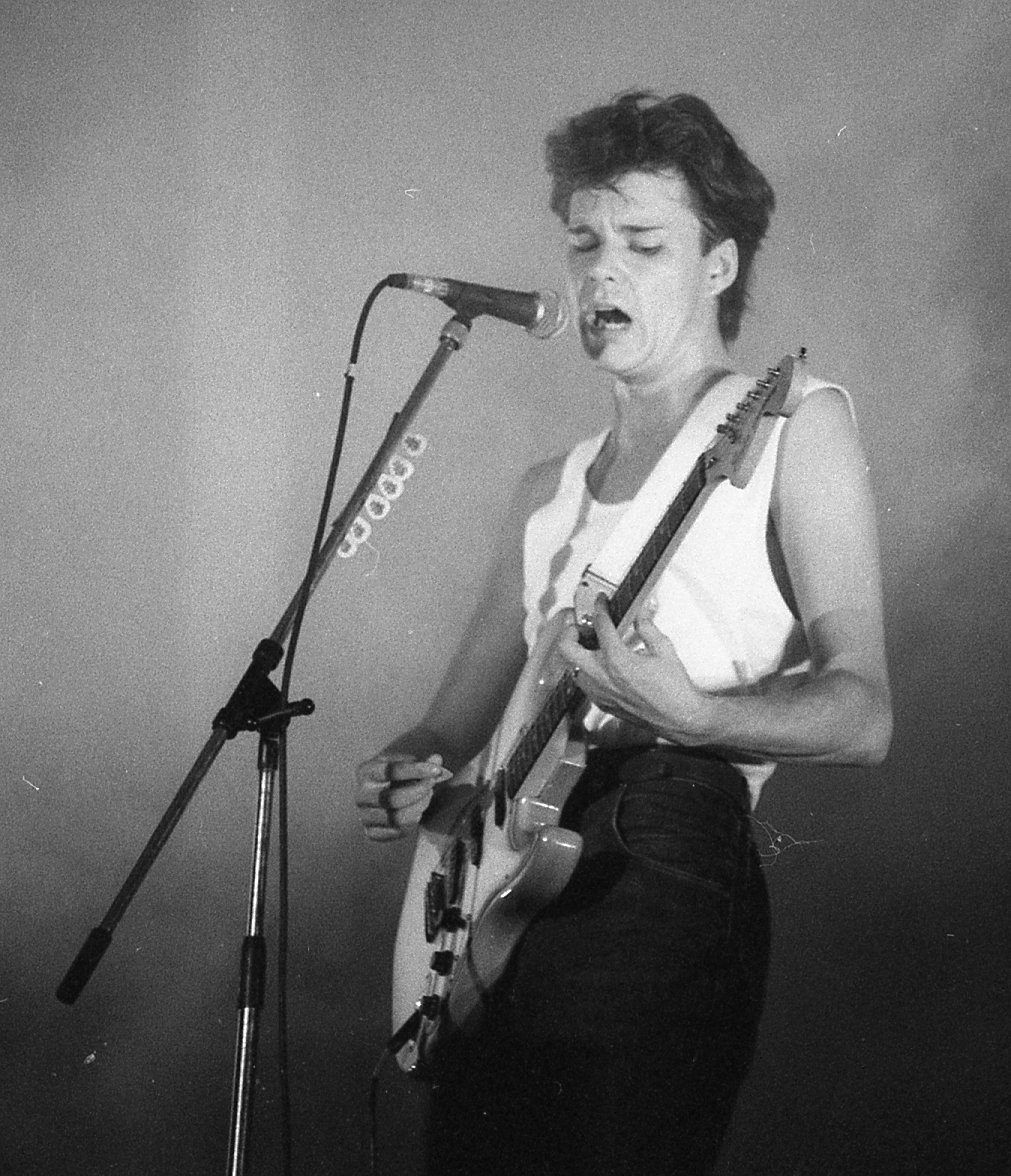
- Adamson in 1983

Background information
- Born: William Stuart Adamson; 11 April 1958; Manchester, England
- Origin: Dunfermline, Fife, Scotland
- Died: 16 December 2001 (aged 43) Honolulu, Hawaii, U.S.
- Genres: Punk rock; new wave; Celtic rock; alternative rock
- Occupations: Singer-songwriter; musician
- Instruments: Vocals; guitar; keyboards; bass guitar
- Years active: 1976–2001
- Labels: No Bad; Virgin; Phonogram; Mercury; Vertigo; Compulsion; Fox; Transatlantic; Track
- Formerly of: Skids; Big Country; the Raphaels

William Stuart Adamson (11 April 1958 – 16 December 2001) was a Scottish rock guitarist and singer. Adamson began his career in the late 1970s as a founder and performer with the punk rock band Skids. After leaving Skids in 1981, he formed Big Country and was the band's lead singer and guitarist. The group's commercial heyday was in the 1980s. In the 1990s, he was a member of the alternative country band the Raphaels. In the late 1970s the British music journalist John Peel referred to his virtuosity as a guitarist by calling him "a new Jimi Hendrix".

== Early life and career ==
Adamson was born in Manchester, England, to Scottish parents Anne (née Muir) and William Adamson. When he was four, his family moved to the small mining village of Crossgates, about a mile east of Dunfermline in Fife. Adamson's father joined the merchant navy and was rarely home, so Adamson was mostly brought up by his mother. Adamson attributed his love of music to his mother, who worked at a record shop, and would often bring records home. Adamson received his formal education at Beath High School.

Adamson started playing rock music during the British punk rock movement of the mid-1970s, forming a Dunfermline band called Tattoo in 1976 after seeing the Damned at a gig in Edinburgh. Besides Adamson, Tattoo included his friend William Simpson, who would also play bass guitar in their next band, Skids, which began performing in the local area and in Edinburgh.

== Skids ==
Adamson founded Skids in 1977 when he was 18. He and Simpson first recruited drummer Thomas Kellichan and performed as a trio until meeting the 16-year-old Richard Jobson, who became the act's lead singer/frontman, Adamson and Jobson being the principal songwriters for the act.

Skids' biggest success was the single "Into the Valley", released in 1979, which reached number 10 in the UK Singles Chart. The band had four chart singles in the United Kingdom that year. Adamson was involved with the band's first three long-players, before quitting the act in 1981 after disagreements with Jobson, whose personality was increasingly dominating the band's output. Jobson later said of Adamson: "This was a guy who had a mortgage, a wife, and a family when we were all trying to live some mythic punk lifestyle. He seemed level-headed, grounded."

== Big Country ==
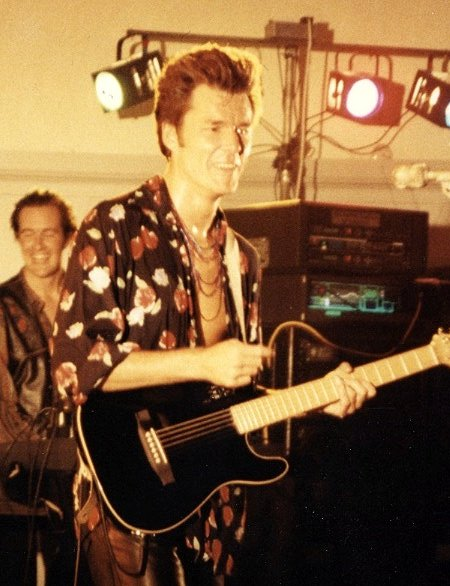
Adamson in 1991

Adamson found international fame with Big Country, a band formed with friend and fellow guitarist Bruce Watson, then employed as a submarine cleaner at Rosyth naval base, and a rhythm section of studio musicians Mark Brzezicki and Tony Butler, found with the help of his label.

Big Country's first hit, 1983's "Fields of Fire", reached the UK's Top 10, and was rapidly followed by the album The Crossing. The album was a big hit in North America (Canada number 4, United States number 18) powered by the single "In a Big Country", which was performed on Saturday Night Live and the Grammy Awards. The video for "In a Big Country" received frequent airplay on MTV and featured the band riding all terrain vehicles in the countryside.

Their second album Steeltown appeared in October 1984. The band's third album The Seer (1986) featured Kate Bush on the title track. The first two albums were produced by Steve Lillywhite. The band continued to record studio albums and tour until 2000. Adamson supplied much of the distinctive guitar work, as well as being the lead singer and main songwriter (both music and lyrics). The band's lineup rarely underwent changes, the exception being the departure of drummer Mark Brzezicki who left in the summer of 1989 and was replaced by Pat Ahern. Brzezicki re-joined the band in 1993.

== Personal life ==
Adamson was married twice. He married his first wife Sandra (née Davidson) in 1980, and had two children with her in 1982 and 1985. His first child Callum Adamson is the guitarist of the band Ahab, and his daughter Kirsten has a solo musical career. He continued to live in the Dunfermline area until 1996, when he split with Sandra and moved to Nashville, US. There he met his second wife, a hairdresser named Melanie Shelley, who he married in 2000, and founded his final band, the alternative country band the Raphaels, a duo of Adamson and Nashville songwriter Marcus Hummon.

Adamson's hobbies included football, fishing, going to the gym and motorcycling: He was a keen motorcyclist who regularly purchased new machines for riding around Fife. His interest extended to the race track where he sponsored the career of the British Championship rider Iain Duffus in the late 1980s.

Adamson experienced serious problems related to alcoholism during the early-1980s, but he had given up alcohol in 1985, shortly after the birth of his second child, after attending Alcoholics Anonymous meetings. His recovery from alcoholism coincided with the Live Aid concert, which Big Country had to miss performing at. His drinking started again in 1999.

== Death ==
In 1999, Adamson briefly disappeared, causing the band to miss performances. In 2001, Adamson was again reported missing by his wife Melanie. He had left his son a note on 7 November saying, "back by noon Sunday [11 November]." Adamson and his wife had been estranged for several weeks. He had been due to face DUI charges in March 2002 and had been ordered to attend Alcoholics Anonymous (AA). He had previously experienced problems related to alcoholism and had begun drinking again after having been sober for over a decade. His manager had hired a private investigator to search for Adamson, and two fans also volunteered to help out. By early December, he had last been reported as having seen a football match between Iran and Ireland in Atlanta.

On 4 December 2001, Adamson checked into the Best Western Plaza Hotel in Honolulu, Hawaii. On 16 December 2001, Adamson was found dead in his hotel room. According to a local police report, he had died by hanging himself with an electrical cord from a pole in a wardrobe. A subsequent Coroner's Office report found that he had consumed a large amount of alcohol around the time of his death.

His body was flown back to Scotland, where after a private funeral service at Dunfermline Crematorium in Fife, he was cremated. On the evening of 27 December 2001, a public memorial service was held to celebrate his life and career at Carnegie Hall, Dunfermline, attended by Richard Jobson and a crowd of several hundred mourners, including Adamson's family and friends, and former members of Big Country. Messages of condolence were publicly read out, including one from U2's the Edge, stating that Adamson with Big Country had written the songs that he wished U2 could write.

A legal dispute over his estate ensued between Adamson's ex-wife Sandra and Melanie after his death.

== Memorials ==
In April 2009, a mural of Adamson was unveiled at East End Park, the home of Dunfermline Athletic Football Club of whom Adamson was a fan: the mural was painted by art students from the local Queen Anne High and Dunfermline High schools, and adorns the wall of the north stand.

In September 2011 a commemorative bench to Adamson was unveiled at Pittencrieff Park in Dunfermline. It was paid for by fans and is inscribed with some of his lyrics chosen by fans in an online poll.

Adamson was the inspiration behind the song "3 Ways To See Despair" by Manic Street Preachers.

A housing development in Crossgates, opened in 2021, is named "Stuart Adamson Crescent".

== Equipment ==
According to Skids bassist Bill Simpson, Adamson's first real guitar was a Gibson Flying V. He is usually associated with the Yamaha SG2000 guitar, which he used extensively during the Skids years, as well as on the first two Big Country albums. He also used Fender Stratocasters in this period to achieve lighter tones. Around the time of The Seer, Adamson began to lay his SG2000s aside and experimented with other models. Among these were several Les Pauls, a Gretsch Duo-Jet, and a number of ESP Model 901 Stratalike with humbucking pickups (in distinctive yellow and red colours). Adamson also had several guitars made for him by the Glasgow guitar-maker Jimmy Moon.

Big Country's distinctive 'Scottish' sound was created using an MXR pitch transposer, which pushed the guitar notes up an octave and created a shrill, bagpipe-esque whine. This can be heard in the lead guitar passages in the song "In a Big Country". Adamson was also noted for his use of the E-Bow, a device that magnetically vibrates guitar strings and generates unique tones with infinite sustain. The e-bow is most prominent in the introductions to the songs "The Storm" and "Lost Patrol".

The Scottish flavour is also present due to Adamson (and other co-writers in the band) using an open 'drone' string when writing and playing songs.

Adamson used Session 'Sessionette:75' amplifiers mainly for live performances and recordings.

During his time in Skids, Stuart used HH amplifiers. In early Big Country he used Marshall but moved to Fender Showman twin amps, including two with silver eagles stencilled on the grilles (a reference to cover art of their third album, The Seer). Later he moved to Mesa Boogie amps and often displayed a small Saltire badge on the corner.

== Discography ==
Skids discography

Year	Title	Label	Notes
1979	Scared to Dance	Virgin	
1979	Days in Europa	Virgin	
1980	The Absolute Game	Virgin	
1981	Joy	Virgin	Guitar on Track 5 only.
1982	Fanfare	Virgin	
1987	Dunfermline: A Collection of the Skids' Finest Moments	Virgin	
2007	The Saints Are Coming: The Best of The Skids	EMI/Virgin	

Big Country Discography

The Raphaels Discography

Year	Title	Label
2001	Supernatural	Track

== See also ==
- List of solved missing person cases (2000s)
