= Jacob's Ladder (the Filthy Tongues album) =

Studio album by The Filthy Tongues
- Released: 18 March 2016
- Recorded: 2014–2015
- Genre: Alternative rock
- Label: Blokshok Records/Neon Tetra

Jacob's Ladder is the first album from the Scottish group the Filthy Tongues and was self-released in 2016 by the band on their own label Blokshok Records, in association with Neon Tetra. The album follows Addiction and Dark Passenger, two records recorded by an earlier incarnation of the band known as Isa & the Filthy Tongues, as well as following the albums released by the members earlier major label bands Goodbye Mr Mackenzie and Angelfish.

Inspired by the dark stories of the band's Edinburgh base, as well as the vignette-based approach to the lyrics of the Garbage song "Bleed Like Me", Jacob's Ladder received much praise from the Scottish and wider music press.

The Scotsman compared the title track with the work of Nick Cave.

== Track listing ==
1. "Jacob's Ladder"
2. "High"
3. "Holy Brothers"
4. "Long Time Dead"
5. "Bowhead Saint"
6. "Violent Sorrow"
7. "Children of the Filthy"
8. "Kingdom of Ice"
