= The Saints Are Coming =

1978 song by Skids

- Wide Open EP cover

Single by Skids

from the album Scared to Dance
- A-side: "Of One Skin"
- B-side: "Night and Day"; "Contusion"
- Released: October 1978
- Recorded: 1978
- Genre: Punk rock, post-punk
- Length: 2:37
- Label: Virgin
- Songwriters: Richard Jobson; Stuart Adamson
- Producer: David Batchelor

Skids singles chronology
"Sweet Suburbia" (1978)	"The Saints Are Coming" (1978)	"Into the Valley" (1979)

"The Saints are Coming" was the third single by the Scottish punk rock band Skids, featured on their 1979 debut album, Scared to Dance. The song became an international hit when it was covered in 2006 by U2 and Green Day.

== Skids' original version ==
The single was released as part of a four-track EP, Wide Open, which also featured an A-side and two B-sides. The song was also released on their 1979 debut album, Scared to Dance. The song featured Richard Jobson singing of a man facing inclement weather and personal fears, and reached number 48 on the UK Singles Chart in the week ending 11 November 1978. The song's lyrics were written by Richard Jobson with music by Stuart Adamson, who later went on to form Big Country. As with the band's following single, "Into the Valley", it is sung by fans of Dunfermline Athletic F.C. It is also used as the walk-on music by Premiership Rugby club Northampton Saints, Rugby League Super League club St Helens RFC who enter the field in the second half to it and EFL Championship club Southampton F.C., and Welsh Premier League club The New Saints FC, who are all known as The Saints.

=== Wide Open track listing ===
Track listing for the 1978 EP single, Wide Open, which features "The Saints Are Coming".

A-side
No.	Title	Length
1.	"The Saints Are Coming"	2:37
2.	"Of One Skin"	2:28

B-side
No.	Title	Length
3.	"Night and Day"	2:35
4.	"Contusion"	2:42

=== Personnel ===
- Richard Jobson – vocals / guitar
- Stuart Adamson – guitars / vocals
- William Simpson – bass guitar / vocals
- Thomas Kellichan – drums

With:

- Chris Jenkins – guitar
- David Batchelor – keyboards

== U2 and Green Day cover ==
"The Saints Are Coming"

Single by U2 and Green Day

from the album U218 Singles
- B-side: "The Saints Are Coming" (live from New Orleans)
- Released: 31 October 2006
- Recorded: Abbey Road Studios, September 2006
- Genre: Punk rock
- Length: 3:24
- Label: Mercury
- Songwriters: Richard Jobson, Stuart Adamson
- Producers: Rick Rubin, Jacknife Lee

Green Day singles chronology
"Jesus of Suburbia" (2005)	"The Saints Are Coming" (2006)	"The Simpsons Theme" (2007)

U2 singles chronology
"One" (with Mary J. Blige) (2006)	"The Saints Are Coming" (2006)	"Window in the Skies" (2007)

In September 2006, it was announced that U2 and Green Day were to record a cover version of the song for charitable purposes following Hurricane Katrina.

=== Release ===
To coincide with the U2 and Green Day recording of the song, both bands performed it together live during the Monday Night Football Pregame show of the New Orleans Saints versus Atlanta Falcons game on 25 September 2006. This was the first game in the Louisiana Superdome since it was heavily damaged by Hurricane Katrina in August 2005. The live performance of the song was later sold online to benefit Music Rising, a charity created by U2's The Edge in order to bring instruments and music programs back to New Orleans.

In the four-song set, U2 and Green Day performed "Wake Me Up When September Ends" followed by a medley of the American folk song "The House of the Rising Sun", Skids' "The Saints Are Coming", and U2's "Beautiful Day" as a seven-piece band, augmented by the Rebirth Brass Band, the New Birth Brass Band, Troy Andrews, and Big Sam Williams. The lyrics of all four songs were customized by singers Billie Joe Armstrong and Bono to commemorate the trials, tribulations, and successes that faced the city over the past year. Punctuating the 68,000 fans' first season-ticket sellout of the Louisiana Superdome in its 31-year history, the New Orleans Saints beat the Atlanta Falcons 23–3. Since then, the song has been played at Saints home games before they take the field. The live version of "The Saints Are Coming" was immediately made available for download purchase at Real Rhapsody.

The studio version of the song was released for digital download on 30 October 2006 and released as a CD single on 6 November 2006. The song also appears on the U2 compilation album U218 Singles, which was released on 20 November 2006. The song was played for the first time by U2 alone on the Pacific Leg of the Vertigo Tour in Brisbane, Australia, on 7 November 2006. The only performance of this song by Green Day alone was on 7 August 2009 when the band performed the song in New Orleans. Billie Joe Armstrong also ad-libbed lines from the song over the bass solo to Green Day hit single "Holiday" during some performances on their 21st Century Breakdown World Tour in the summer of 2010.

=== Music video ===
A music video for "The Saints Are Coming," directed by Chris Milk, was released on YouTube on 27 October 2006. The music video shows the two bands playing at the Abbey Road Studio and at the Louisiana Superdome (though the footage from the live performance at the Superdome has been overdubbed with the studio version of the song), intermixed with news footage of the displacement of residents after Hurricane Katrina in New Orleans. The second half of the video shows an alternate history in which George W. Bush redeployed troops and vehicles from Iraq to New Orleans to help victims of the hurricane, with the military personnel fulfilling the titular role of the "saints". According to Chris Milk, this was done to "make a commentary on the Katrina disaster ... from the standpoint of how things can and should be done in the future". The video ends with military support vehicles fading out as the camera pans to a sign that reads "Not as seen on TV", alluding to the criticized response to Katrina while also parodying restrictions on the media of rescue coverage. The video had more than two million views on YouTube five days after its initial upload.

=== Reception ===
The single earned a Grammy nomination for Best Rock Performance by a Duo or Group with Vocal.

=== Track listing ===
No.	Title	Length
1.	"The Saints Are Coming"	3:24
2.	"The Saints Are Coming" (Live from New Orleans)	3:27

=== Charts ===
==== Weekly charts ====
Chart (2006–2007)	Peak position
Australia (ARIA)	1
Austria (Ö3 Austria Top 40)	3
Belgium (Ultratop 50 Flanders)	2
Belgium (Ultratop 50 Wallonia)	12
Canada (Nielsen SoundScan)	1
Czech Republic Airplay (ČNS IFPI)	5
Denmark (Tracklisten)	1
Europe (Eurochart Hot 100)	1
Finland (Suomen virallinen lista)	8
France (SNEP)	44
Germany (GfK)	6
Hungary (Single Top 40)	1
Ireland (IRMA)	1
Italy (FIMI)	1
Netherlands (Dutch Top 40)	1
Netherlands (Single Top 100)	1
New Zealand (Recorded Music NZ)	4
Norway (VG-lista)	1
Scottish Singles Sales (Official Charts)	2
Slovakia Airplay (ČNS IFPI)	33
Spain (Promusicae)	1
Sweden (Sverigetopplistan)	4
Switzerland (Schweizer Hitparade)	1
UK Singles (Official Charts)	2
US Billboard Hot 100	51
US Adult Alternative Airplay (Billboard)	7
US Alternative Airplay (Billboard)	22
US Mainstream Rock (Billboard)	33
Venezuela Pop Rock (Record Report)	3

==== Year-end charts ====
Year-end chart performance for "The Saints Are Coming"
Chart (2006)	Position
Australia (ARIA)	61
Europe (Eurochart Hot 100)	79
Italy (FIMI)	12
Netherlands (Dutch Top 40)	86
Netherlands (Single Top 100)	48
Sweden (Sverigetopplistan)	82
Switzerland (Schweizer Hitparade)	82
