= The Absolute Game =

Studio album by Skids
- Released: 19 September 1980
- Recorded: 1980
- Studio: The Manor Studio, Shipton-on-Cherwell; Audio International Studios, London W1
- Genre: Post-punk, new wave
- Label: Virgin
- Producer: Mick Glossop

Skids chronology
Days in Europa (1979)	The Absolute Game (1980)	Joy (1981)

The Absolute Game is the third studio album by Scottish punk rock and new wave band Skids. Recorded in 1980 and produced by Mick Glossop, it was released in September 1980 by record label Virgin. It became their most commercially successful album, reaching No. 9 in the UK Albums Chart.

== Writing and recording ==
This album marks the first collaborative effort between Richard Jobson and new bassist Russell Webb, who continued to work together in the band The Armoury Show and also on Jobson's solo album Badman.

== Musical style ==
Alex Ogg of AllMusic opined "Musically, the Skids were branching out and writing some illustrious pop tunes."

== Controversy ==
Initial copies came with a limited edition second disc entitled Strength Through Joy, a collection of material recorded during The Absolute Game sessions but omitted from the album. Its songs apparently feature members of the band playing each other's instruments. Richard Jobson, the Skids' lead singer, later stated that this title had been taken from Dirk Bogarde's autobiography Snakes and Ladders and was not based on the Nazi slogan "Kraft durch Freude". However, it continued in the controversial theme of the first release of Days in Europa, which had also been withdrawn after accusations of Nazi glorification.

== Release ==
The Absolute Game was released in September 1980, preceded by the release of Circus Games as a single in August. It reached No. 9 in the UK Albums Chart.

Around this time the band was riven by internal rifts and disagreements, leading to various changes in personnel. Soon after the release and tour of The Absolute Game, Adamson and Baillie left the band.

== Reception ==
Professional ratings
Review scores
Source	Rating
AllMusic	3/5 stars
Record Collector	4/5 stars

Shane Baldwin of Record Collector called it "their finest work, despite the fact that, by then, Jobson and Adamson's relationship had begun to founder. Endlessly inventive and perfectly executed, it deservedly became their most successful release". Ira Robbins of Trouser Press wrote "Parts of The Absolute Game are just arty pretense, but the inclusion of substantial, engaging material makes it a reasonable addition to the collection."

== Track listing ==
All tracks are written by Skids (Richard Jobson, Stuart Adamson, Russell Webb and Mike Baillie), except "Out of Town", written by Jobson and Adamson.

Side A
No.	Title	Length
1.	"Circus Games"	4:10
2.	"Out of Town"	4:08
3.	"Goodbye Civilian"	4:15
4.	"The Children Saw the Shame"	3:40
5.	"A Woman in Winter"	5:40

Side B
No.	Title	Length
1.	"Hurry On Boys"	3:42
2.	"Happy to Be with You"	3:36
3.	"The Devils Decade"	5:42
4.	"One Decree"	3:23
5.	"Arena"	5:10

2008 reissue bonus tracks
No.	Title	Length
11.	"Circus Games" (single A-side edit, 1980)	4:10
12.	"Goodbye Civilian" (single A-side edit, 1980)	3:31
13.	"Monkey Mcguire Meets Specky Potter Behind Lochore Institute" ("Goodbye Civilian" single B-side, 1980)	2:55
14.	"An Incident in Algiers" (Strength Through Joy EP, 1980)	3:55
15.	"Grievance" (Strength Through Joy EP, 1980)	2:58
16.	"Strength Through Joy" (Strength Through Joy EP, 1980)	1:59
17.	"Filming Africa" (Strength Through Joy EP, 1980)	3:39
18.	"A Man for All Seasons" (Strength Through Joy EP, 1980)	1:50
19.	"Snakes and Ladders" (Strength Through Joy EP, 1980)	4:01
20.	"Surgical Triumph" (Strength Though Joy EP, 1980)	2:13
21.	"The Bell Jar" (Strength Though Joy EP, 1980)	2:33

=== Strength Through Joy ===
Side A
No.	Title	Length
1.	"An Incident in Algiers"	3:55
2.	"Grievance"	2:58
3.	"Strength Through Joy"	1:59
4.	"Filming in Africa"	3:39

Side B
No.	Title	Length
1.	"A Man for All Seasons"	1:50
2.	"Snakes and Ladders"	4:01
3.	"Surgical Triumph"	2:13
4.	"The Bell Jar"	2:33

== Personnel ==
Skids

- Richard Jobson – vocals, guitar
- Stuart Adamson – guitar, vocals, keyboards, percussion
- Russell Webb – bass guitar, vocals, keyboards, percussion
- Mike Baillie – drums, vocals, percussion

Additional personnel

- Jude Nettleton – vocals
- Julius Newell – vocals
- Andrew Sigsworth – vocals
- John Sigsworth – vocals
- Alison Pipkin – vocals
- David Pipkin – vocals
- Hannah Yeadon – vocals
- Esther Marshall – vocals
- Chloe Dymott – vocals
- Marlis Dunklau – vocals
- Gracie Benson – vocals
- Sally Nettleton – vocals
- Harriet Bakewell – vocals
- Mary Volke – vocals
- Derek Wadsworth – didgeridoo
