= Fanfare (Skids album) =

Compilation album by Skids
- Released: 1982
- Recorded: 1978–1980
- Genre: Punk rock, new wave, post-punk
- Label: Virgin Records
- Producer: Mick Glossop, Bill Nelson, David Batchelor

Skids chronology
Fanfare (1982)	Dunfermline: A Collection of the Skids' Finest Moments (1987)

Professional ratings
Review scores
Source	Rating
AllMusic	4/5 stars
The Encyclopedia of Popular Music	3/5 stars
Sounds	5/5 stars

Fanfare is a compilation album by Scottish punk and new wave band Skids, released in 1982 via Virgin Records shortly after the group dissolved. John Peel wrote the album's liner notes.

Despite being a compilation, it doesn't contain any tracks from the band's fourth and final album Joy.

== Critical reception ==
Trouser Press called Fanfare "an excellent compilation of singles and album tracks that serves as the perfect introduction to the Skids' magic."

== Track listing ==
=== Side 1 ===
1. "Into The Valley"
2. "Working For The Yankee Dollar" (live)
3. "Sweet Suburbia"
4. "A Woman in Winter"
5. "Masquerade"
6. "The Saints Are Coming"

=== Side 2 ===
1. "Animation"
2. "Out Of Town"
3. "T.V. Stars" (live)
4. "Of One Skin" (live)
5. "Charade"
6. "Circus Games"
