= Scared to Dance =

Studio album by Skids
- Released: 23 February 1979
- Recorded: 1978
- Studio: Air Studios, London
- Genre: Punk rock
- Length: 37:50
- Label: Virgin
- Producer: David Batchelor

Skids chronology
Wide Open (1978)	Scared to Dance (1979)	Days in Europa (1979)

Singles from Scared to Dance
- 1. "The Saints Are Coming" Released: October 1978; 2. "Into the Valley" Released: 16 February 1979

Scared to Dance is the debut studio album by Scottish punk rock band Skids. It was released on 23 February 1979 by record label Virgin.

== Writing ==
Anti-war themes are a recurring motif in the album. There are also a great deal of references in singer Richard Jobson's lyrics to the band's home region in Scotland.

== Music and production ==
Scared to Dance was produced by David Batchelor and engineered by Mick Glossop. It was the first album to feature Stuart Adamson's 'bagpipe guitar', which would be the trademark of his later band Big Country.

== Release ==
The album was preceded by the single "Into the Valley", released on 16 February 1979, which reached No. 10 in the UK Singles Chart. Scared to Dance was released on 23 February, reaching No. 19 on the UK Albums Chart.

== Reception ==
Professional ratings
Review scores
Source	Rating
AllMusic	4/5 stars
Smash Hits	9/10

Scared to Dance has been well received by critics. Ira Robbins of Trouser Press called the album "excellent [...] Using loud guitar and semi-martial drumming for its basis, Jobson's hearty singing sounds like an 18th century general leading his merry troops down from the hills into glorious battle."

== Legacy ==
The song "The Saints Are Coming" was later covered by Green Day and U2 and released as a charity single, reaching #1 in several countries.

"Into the Valley" became popular as adopted and sung by fans of Dunfermline Athletic F.C., the band's local football team, as well as Charlton Athletic F.C. in England whose ground is known as The Valley. In the 2025–26 season, Dunfermline released a third kit based on the album artwork of Scared to Dance.

== Track listing ==
All lyrics are written by Richard Jobson; all music is composed by Stuart Adamson.

Side A
No.	Title	Length
1.	"Into the Valley"	3:17
2.	"Scared to Dance"	3:19
3.	"Of One Skin"	2:29
4.	"Dossier (Of Fallibility)"	3:31
5.	"Melancholy Soldiers"	3:02
6.	"Hope and Glory"	3:17

Side B
No.	Title	Length
7.	"The Saints Are Coming"	2:41
8.	"Six Times"	2:10
9.	"Calling the Tune"	4:03
10.	"Integral Plot"	2:39
11.	"Charles" (1979 re-recording, composed Adamson)	2:43
12.	"Scale"	4:43

2005 reissue bonus tracks
No.	Title	Length
13.	"Charles" (original 1978 Charles EP version)	2:35
14.	"Sweet Suburbia" (non-album single A-side, 1978)	2:25
15.	"Open Sound" ("Sweet Suburbia" single B-side, 1978)	1:53
16.	"TV Stars" ("Into the Valley" single B-side, 1979, recorded live at the Marquee, London, 1 November 1978)	1:44
17.	"Night and Day" (Wide Open EP B-side, 1978)	2:38
18.	"Contusion" (Wide Open EP B-side, 1978)	2:43
19.	"Reasons" (Charles EP, 1978)	2:08
20.	"Test Tube Babies" (Charles EP, 1978)	2:04

== Personnel ==
Skids

- Richard Jobson – vocals, guitar
- Stuart Adamson – guitar
- William Simpson – bass guitar
- Thomas Kellichan – drums

Additional personnel

- David Batchelor – piano, production
- Chris Jenkins – guitar

Technical personnel

- Mick Glossop – engineering
- Steve Prestage – engineering assistance
- Russell Mills – sleeve artwork
- Dennis Morris – sleeve photography

== Charts ==
1979 chart performance for Scared to Dance
Chart (1979)	Peak position
UK Albums (OCC)	19

2022 chart performance for Scared to Dance
Chart (2022)	Peak position
Scottish Albums (OCC)	1
