= Joy (Skids album) =

Studio album by Skids
- Released: 20 November 1981
- Studios: Britannia Row Studios, London, England and Highland Studios, Inverness, Scotland
- Genres: Post-punk, Celtic rock, folk rock
- Length: 46:51
- Label: Virgin
- Producer: Russell Webb

Skids chronology
The Absolute Game (1980)	Joy (1981)	Burning Cities (2018)

Joy is the fourth studio album by the Scottish punk rock and new wave band Skids. It was their first album after the departure of signature guitarist Stuart Adamson who went on to found Big Country. It represented a change of direction from rock towards folk music—amplifying the traditional Scottish element already hinted at in previous releases. This would be their last album until the release of Burning Cities over 36 years later.

== Recording ==
The band's line-up included: Richard Jobson and Russell Webb along with Wayne County & the Electric Chairs' J. J. Johnson (drums and percussion), Paul Wishart (saxophone, flute, keyboards, percussion and vocals) and a collection of musical friends. They rehearsed at Britannia Row Studios in London.

The first single "Fields" was released in August—with Kenny Hyslop on drums. The song also featured Billy MacKenzie (vocals) and Alan Rankine (guitar) (core members of The Associates) along with Virginia Astley (flute).

The strummed guitar and marching band elements (bagpipe emulation and percussion) signalled a change in musical direction—though the rabble-rousing-melody and football pitch vocal delivery were standard Skids fare.

A second single, "Iona" (named for the Scottish island) was the only song on the album to be recorded at Highland Studios in Inverness, Scotland. Released in October 1981 this was the last Skids track to feature Stuart Adamson alongside Mike Oldfield. At 3:24 the single edit is significantly shorter than the version on the album.

== Music ==
Joy marks a concerted effort to update traditional Scottish folk music into the age of modern rock recordings. The sound is fundamentally more pastoral than previous Skids efforts. Gone are the layers of harmonically treated electric guitar. Elements of this style were hinted at previously—particularly on the Strength Through Joy mini-album. The lyrical concerns of strife, war and brotherhood are Jobson staples.

With Paul Wishart on saxophone "And the Band Played Waltzing Matilda" is a cover version of the song by Eric Bogle.

== Release ==
Joy was released in November 1981.

Promotion problems at Virgin forestalled a tour although the band recorded a BBC Radio 1 session and shot a music video for "Iona." With patchy coverage, no live support and a difficult change in musical direction, the record sank without a trace. Critical reception was mixed at best, and the band split up the following year.

The album bore fruit in several working relationships. Virginia Astley would go on to record her debut solo releases with Russell Webb and guest on Jobson's poetry album The Ballad of Etiquette.

Following the disbandment of Skids remaining members Richard Jobson and Russell Webb formed The Armoury Show with Magazine's John McGeoch and John Doyle.

Joy remained unreleased on CD until 2016 but was released in MP3 format on 7 December 2009—including several alternate single mixes as bonus tracks.

The album was included in the 6-CD box set of Skids albums "Skids – The Virgin Years" in 2016.

== Reception ==
Professional ratings
Review scores
Source	Rating
AllMusic	2/5 stars

Ira Robbins of Trouser Press called it "a failed concept album about Scotland. To call it bad is curt but realistic." Mark Allan of AllMusic called it "[a] gloomy conclusion to what was once a most vibrant band." The Guardian greeted it favourably.

== Track listing ==
All tracks are written by Richard Jobson and Russell Webb, except where noted.

Side A
No.	Title	Writer(s)	Length
1.	"Blood and Soil"	Jobson, Stuart Adamson	3:58
2.	"A Challenge (The Wanderer)"		6:10
3.	"Men of Mercy"		1:11
4.	"A Memory"		5:05
5.	"Iona"		7:15

Side B
No.	Title	Writer(s)	Length
6.	"In Fear of Fire"		0:42
7.	"Brothers"		3:11
8.	"And the Band Played Waltzing Matilda"	Eric Bogle	5:30
9.	"The Men of the Fall"		6:04
10.	"The Sound of Retreat" (instrumental)		3:13
11.	"Fields"		4:32

Reissue bonus tracks
No.	Title	Writer(s)	Length
12.	"Iona" (7-Inch Single Mix)		5:07
13.	"Blood and Soil" (7-Inch Single Mix)	Jobson, Adamson	3:11
14.	"Fields" (7-Inch Single Mix)		3:32
15.	"Brave Man" (7-Inch Single Mix)		3:37
16.	"Fields" (12-Inch Single Mix)		4:27
17.	"Brave Man" (12-Inch Single Mix)		6:43

Notes

- Track lengths taken from listing on band's official site. Some pressings of the 7-inch vinyl single for "Iona" listed a 4:55 version of the title track: this was a labelling error, and these pressings actually contained the 5:07 7-inch single mix included on the 2009 reissue. Other pressings contained a shorter remix/edit which ran 3:20 (with the correct running time listed on the label); this has been released on various CD compilations.

== Personnel ==
Skids

- Richard Jobson – lead and backing vocals, guitar, piano
- Russell Webb – bass, backing vocals, guitar, piano, timpani, choir

Additional personnel

- Paul Wishart – saxophone, flute, piano, backing vocals, choir
- Alan Darby – additional guitar
- Tim Cross – Fairlight synthesizer, piano
- J J Johnson – drums, percussion
- Dave Duncan – bodhrán
- Stuart Adamson – guitar (track 5)
- Mike Oldfield – Fairlight synthesizer (track 5)
- Alan Rankine – guitar (track 11)
- Billy MacKenzie – vocals (track 11)
- Ken Lockie – cello (track 11), vocals (track 11)
- Virginia Astley – choir; flute (track 11)
- Frances Lynch – choir
- Nicky Holland – choir
- Debbie Mitchell – choir
- Nick Griffiths – choir
- Kenny Hyslop – drums
- Carey Taylor – percussion

== Production ==
- Ray Smith – cover art
