= Skids (band) =

British punk rock band

Background information
- Origin: Dunfermline, Fife, Scotland
- Genres: Punk rock, new wave, post-punk
- Years active: 1977–1982, 2007–2010, 2016–present
- Labels: No-Bad, Virgin, Live Here Now
- Spinoffs: Big Country The Armoury Show
- Members: Richard Jobson; Connor Whyte; Peter Byrchmore; Nick Hernandez
- Past members: Stuart Adamson; Rusty Egan; Thomas Kellichan; Russell Webb; William Simpson; Mike Baillie; Bruce Watson; Jamie Watson
- Website: skidsofficial.com

Skids are a Scottish punk rock and new wave band, formed in Dunfermline in 1977 by Stuart Adamson (guitar, keyboards, percussion and backing vocals), William Simpson (bass guitar and backing vocals), Thomas Kellichan (drums) and Richard Jobson (vocals, guitar and keyboards). Their biggest successes were the 1979 single "Into the Valley" and the 1980 album The Absolute Game. In 2016, the band announced a 40th-anniversary tour of the UK with their original singer Richard Jobson.

== History ==
=== Early years (1977–1979) ===
Skids played their first gig on 19 August 1977 at the Bellville Hotel in Pilmuir Street, Dunfermline, Scotland. Within six months they had released the Charles EP on the label No Bad records. The record brought them to the attention of national BBC Radio 1 DJ John Peel. This led to a local gig supporting the Clash. Virgin Records then signed up Skids in April 1978. The singles "Sweet Suburbia" and "The Saints Are Coming" both made commercial inroads, before "Into the Valley" reached the top 10 in the UK Singles Chart in early 1979. The band released their debut studio album, Scared to Dance, the same year. It was recorded at The Townhouse Studios in London, England with production and keyboards by David Batchelor. Adamson walked out towards the end of the sessions before all the guitar overdubs were completed. Session guitarist Chris Jenkins was chief maintenance engineer at Townhouse Studios and completed the album using Adamson's studio set up, adding additional guitar to four tracks – "Into the Valley", "Integral Plot", "Calling the Tune" and "Scared to Dance". In the meantime, Adamson returned to Scotland when the recording was finished. He rejoined the band for the live concert tour promotion of the album. The record included "The Saints Are Coming", which was later covered in late 2006 as a charity single by U2 and Green Day.

Skids enjoyed a further year of chart success as "Masquerade" and "Working for the Yankee Dollar" reached the top 20 in the UK chart. The latter came from their second album, also released in 1979, Days in Europa, with the record's production and keyboards by Bill Nelson. Just before recording of the album commenced, Kellichan left the band and was temporarily replaced on drums by Rusty Egan (ex-Rich Kids, then with the band Visage and a New Romantic 1980s dance DJ at the Blitz club). Egan played on the album and later on the live concert tour of the record. Keyboard player Alistair Moore also temporarily joined the band to perform live with them. He had been recruited to play Bill Nelson's keyboard parts from the record. In November 1979, Mike Baillie, ex-Insect Bites, was recruited as a permanent band member, taking care of the drums, backing vocals and percussion). He slowly took over from Egan, while the band was still touring Days in Europa. Some of Jobson's lyrics as well as the album cover caused controversy. It showed an Olympian being crowned with laurels by an Aryan-looking woman, and the lettering was in Gothic script. Some, including DJ John Peel, felt that this glorified Nazi ideology and it was indeed similar to posters from the 1936 Summer Olympics, held in Germany. After the original version of the album had already been released, Canadian record producer Bruce Fairbairn was brought into the project. The original cover and the track "Pros and the Cons" were removed. The sleeve was completely re-designed and the song "Masquerade" added. The album was also remixed and the tracks re-sequenced. This second version was released in 1980. One updated track, "The Olympian", was released on a flexi-disc single as a free gift with a March 1980 issue of Smash Hits.

=== The Absolute Game, Joy and break-up (1980–1982) ===
In February 1980, one of Skids' founding members, William Simpson, left and was replaced by Russell Webb (bass guitar, backing vocals, keyboards, percussion, and guitar). Webb joined as a permanent band member and immediately started work on the recording of the band's third album The Absolute Game, released in 1980 and produced by Mick Glossop. It proved to be the band's most commercial release, reaching the top 10 of the UK Albums Chart and contained the minor hit single "Circus Games". A few of the tracks on the album also included a collection of fourteen adult and child backing vocalists, along with a lone didgeridoo player. Initial copies of The Absolute Game came with a free limited edition, second album entitled Strength Through Joy, echoing the band's previous controversial themes. Jobson claimed to have got the title from Dirk Bogarde's autobiography Snakes and Ladders.

Soon after the release and live concert tour of The Absolute Game Baillie left the band, shortly followed by Adamson (but Adamson did stay around long enough to play on one more song for the next album, Joy, called "Iona"). Baillie moved back to Scotland to live and Adamson went on to launch his new band, Big Country. This left Jobson and Webb to write and record the band's fourth and final album Joy, which Russell Webb also produced. The pair played multiple instruments on the album, and also invited a collection of seventeen musical friends to perform on various tracks with them. Skids dissolved in 1982, with the compilation Fanfare posthumously issued by Virgin. It was a mixture of most of the band's singles and some B-sides, though it omitted any tracks from the Joy period.

Jobson and Webb then went on to form a new band called The Armoury Show, releasing the single Castles in Spain. The group recorded just one album, Waiting for the Floods in 1985 before splitting up. Jobson went on to pursue a solo career as a poet, songwriter, television presenter and most recently, as a film director. He released albums on the Belgian record label Les Disques du Crepuscule and the UK's own Parlophone Records. Webb proposed a solo career and, according to Armoury Show fan page, later joined Public Image Ltd in 1992 (but played only on their last tour), and is now a video game designer.

=== Reunion concerts, Burning Cities ===
In 2007, Richard Jobson, William Simpson and Mike Baillie, along with Bruce Watson (guitar and backing vocals), Jamie Watson (guitar), Brian Jobson (backing vocals) and Jane Button (backing vocals), got together to play three gigs. They were to commemorate the thirtieth anniversary of the group's formation and as a final tribute to Stuart Adamson, who had died in 2001. The shows on 4 and 5 July were at Dunfermline's Glen Pavilion (where they were supported by Rosyth band The Draymin), outside which Skids had previously played only their second gig, according to Jobson, and on 7 July at the T in the Park festival.

Skids returned to the stage on 28 November 2009 as one of the headlining acts in Homecoming Live, a series of gigs held around the SECC complex in Glasgow to celebrate the end of the Year of Homecoming in Scotland. The line-up mirrored the 2007 gigs, with members of The Gospel Truth Choir joining Button on backing vocals for "A Woman in Winter" and "Working for the Yankee Dollar".

The same line-up performed a concert on 5 March 2010 at the ABC in Glasgow, with support from The Law and Bruce & Jamie Watson, and lastly a concert on 6 March 2010 at the Alhambra Theatre, Dunfermline with support from Beatnic Prestige and Bruce & Jamie Watson. This final concert was to conclude a week of events celebrating the works, past and present, of Richard Jobson as part of The Fifer Festival 2010 on 6 March 2010.

The band undertook another reunion tour in 2017 to celebrate the 40th anniversary of their formation. It had a more extensive set of venues than the 2007 reunion with concerts throughout the UK and Ireland, and headlining the 2017 Rebellion Festival on the final night. The lineup included Richard Jobson, Bill Simpson, Mike Baillie, Bruce Watson and Jamie Watson.

In 2018 Burning Cities included four songs co-written by Martin Metcalfe, formerly of Goodbye Mr Mackenzie. The album reached number 28 in the UK Albums Chart.

=== Songs from a Haunted Ballroom ===
After issuing an acoustic album in 2019, the band (including Big Country's Bruce and Jamie Watson) returned in 2021 with a covers album called Songs from a Haunted Ballroom. The album was recorded as a tribute to a music venue called the Kinema Ballroom in Dunfermline, Scotland (opened in 1938 but now the Kinema Restaurant Global Fusion Buffet) and features covers of tracks by The Clash, The Adverts, Sex Pistols, Magazine and Ultravox! as well as re-recordings of their own "The Saints Are Coming" and "Into the Valley".

=== Destination Düsseldorf ===
A new album entitled Destination Düsseldorf was announced in March 2023 and was released as a vinyl LP, and CD on the 30 June 2023 via Last Night From Glasgow records (Cat No. LNFG117).

On 27 September 2023 Richard Jobson released a statement on the band's official website announcing that for the foreseeable future Bruce and Jamie Watson would be stepping down to focus on their work with Big Country. Replacing them would be long time collaborators and friends Martin Metcalfe and Fin Wilson (The Filthy Tongues). Both had written material for the recent albums Burning Cities and Destination Düsseldorf. Nick Hernandez continues on drums and Dunfermline born Connor Whyte takes over on guitar.

The changes allowed the Skids to honour upcoming tours of the UK, Australia and Europe.

== Band members ==
Current members

- Richard Jobson – lead vocals, guitar, keyboards (1977–1982, 2007–2010, 2016–present)
- Nick Hernandez – drums (2022–present)
- Connor Whyte – guitar (2023–present)
- Peter Byrchmore – bass (2025–present)

Former members

- Stuart Adamson – guitar, backing vocals, keyboards (1977–1981; died 2001)
- William Simpson – bass, backing vocals (1977–1980, 2007–2010, 2016–2022)
- Tom Kellichan – drums (1977–1979)
- Rusty Egan – drums (1979)
- Mike Baillie – drums, backing vocals, percussion (1979–1980, 2007–2010, 2016–2019)
- Russell Webb – bass, backing vocals, keyboards, guitar, percussion (1980–1982)
- Bruce Watson – guitar, backing vocals, bass, drums (2007–2010, 2016–2023)
- Jamie Watson – guitar, backing vocals, bass (2007–2010, 2016–2023)
- Fin Wilson – bass (2023–2024)

== Discography ==
- Scared to Dance (1979)
- Days in Europa (1979)
- The Absolute Game (1980)
- Joy (1981)
- Burning Cities (2018)
- Peaceful Times (2019)
- Songs from a Haunted Ballroom (2021)
- Destination Düsseldorf (2023)

== See also ==
- List of punk bands from the United Kingdom
- List of 1970s punk rock musicians
- List of new wave artists
