= Into the Valley =

Single by Skids

from the album Scared to Dance
- B-side: "T.V. Stars" (Live at the Marquee)
- Released: 1979
- Genre: Rock; new wave
- Label: Virgin
- Songwriters: Richard Jobson, Stuart Adamson
- Producer: David Batchelor

Skids singles chronology
"Sweet Suburbia" (1979)	"Into the Valley" (1979)	"Masquerade" (1979)

"Into the Valley" is a song by Scottish punk rock band Skids, released in 1979 as the second single from their debut album Scared to Dance. It is their best known song, appearing on a number of punk rock and Scottish music compilation albums. It reached number 10 on the UK Singles Chart for the week ending 24 March 1979. It was written by Richard Jobson and Stuart Adamson.

== Background ==
The song's lyrics are notoriously unintelligible owing to Jobson's diction. This has been sent up in a television advertisement for Maxell audio cassettes which features printed (incorrect) "translations" of the words. The chorus, often misquoted, is actually "Ahoy! Ahoy! Land, sea and sky".

In an interview for Uncut magazine from July 2017, Jobson has said that the lyrics were originally from a poem he wrote aged 16, inspired by Alfred Tennyson's The Charge of the Light Brigade. He reframed his earlier words to reflect his concerns about the recruitment of Scottish youths into the army and more specifically about a friend who had been killed whilst on a tour of duty in Northern Ireland.

== In popular culture ==
"Into the Valley" is still used as a theme song for fans of Scottish football team Dunfermline Athletic F.C., the local team of the band, and also English side Charlton Athletic F.C., whose stadium is named The Valley. It was also used by fellow English team Bradford City A.F.C., whose stadium is named Valley Parade, during their Premiership years (1999–2001). It is also played as the teams come out at the Valley Stadium, home of Redditch United F.C.
