= Richard Jobson (television presenter) =

Scottish filmmaker

Richard Jobson D.A., h.c.
- Born: 6 October 1960 (age 66); Kirkcaldy, Scotland
- Occupations: Filmmaker, television host, musician
- Notable work: 16 Years of Alcohol (2003 film) "The Saints are Coming", "Into the Valley" (1979) by Skids
- Spouse: Mariella Frostrup (m. 1979; div. 1984)

Richard Jobson (born 6 October 1960) is a Scottish filmmaker (director, writer, producer) and television presenter. He was also the singer-songwriter i the punk rock-post punk band Skids.

== Early life ==
Jobson was born in Kirkcaldy and grew up in Crosshill and Ballingry in Fife, the son of a miner and a worker at Rosyth Dockyard. He attended St Columba's Roman Catholic High School, Dunfermline. His family were of Irish Catholic descent.

== Skids ==
Jobson was the lead singer with the punk rock group Skids, whose original run was from 1977-1982. Jobson's singing-style with Skids was highly distinctive, and he wrote the lyrics, while Stuart Adamson wrote most of the music.

Scared to Dance, the first Skids album, included the 1979 hit single "Into the Valley", the group's most successful single. Jobson appeared on BBC Television's Top of the Pops singing it. "The Saints are Coming" was also on the album. Jobson said it was about the death of a friend in the British Army. Much of Scared to Dance featured local references, and also Jobson's fascination with the two world wars.

The fourth album by Skids, Joy, released in 1981, was almost entirely written by Jobson and Russell Webb, as the other two band members left, one of whom was Jobson's long-time songwriting partner Stuart Adamson, who moved on to form his new band Big Country.

In September 2006, Green Day and U2 recorded a cover version of 'The Saints are Coming' for charitable purposes.

Skids, including Jobson, reformed from 2007 to 2010 and again from 2016 to present.

== Other musical work ==
Jobson and Russell Webb both shared a common interest in the War Poets, a theme which was in evidence for Jobson's solo album Ballad of Etiquette and which bore a credit for 'Virginia & Josephine' (Wells). This album was released in November 1981, and peaked on the UK indie charts at number 24. At the same time Astley, Nicky Holland and Kate St John auditioned for Bill Drummond at the Zoo Club in Liverpool where they made their live debut.

In 1983, Jobson formed another band with Russell Webb and John McGeoch, called The Armoury Show — named after a 1913 New York modernist art exhibition. Jobson and Webb also worked with Virginia Astley. Webb co-produced her first album From Gardens Where We Feel Secure.

Both Astley and Jobson did recording sessions for Les Disques Du Crépuscule, a Belgian record label, and Jobson made several albums for the label, usually of poetry readings with Astley as his accompanist. At the same time the final Skids album Joy was released, Astley and Nicky Holland appeared as backing vocalists; Astley also played flute on the single "Fields".

Jobson was doing poetry readings at Richard Strange's Cabaret Futura club, in 1981 and '82, and featured on an album of live performances recorded at the club. The album, Fools Rush In Where Angels Dare to Tread, was issued on the Martyrwell label by Strange and Nick Stewart via Island Records and was engineered by Astley's brother Jon Astley. Amongst a lot of strange-sounding and difficult music was the first ever recording by Kissing the Pink.

For Crépuscule's various artists compilation LP The Fruit of the Original Sin, Jobson performed a poem called 'Homage To Marguerite Duras' with music by Astley.

In the mid-1980s Astley and Jobson toured Japan to promote his album An Afternoon in Company. Much of Jobson's spoken-word material for the Cocteau and Crépuscule labels has been reissued on Compact disc-CD by the LTM label.

== Television and film career ==
From the mid-1980s, Jobson became a front man for music and arts programmes on the BBC, ITV and Sky.

Jobson was a presenter on the arts magazine programme 01-for London from 1988 to 1992, as well as being music reporter and interviewer across the same period for BBC daytime show The Garden Party. He was also a film reviewer for Sky Television, and in the mid 1990s presented a late-night ITV series Hollywood Report that aired in many of the network's regions. Katie Wagner worked as a reporter on the show.

In June 2013, Jobson was awarded an honorary degree (Doctor of Arts) from Edinburgh Napier University.

== Discography ==
With Skids

With The Armoury Show

Solo

Year	Title	Label	Format
1981	The Ballad of Etiquette	LTM Recordings (2006 reissue)	Album
1988	Badman	Parlophone	12" album

== Filmography ==
Features

- Wayland's Song (2013) (director, writer)
- The Somnambulists (2012) (director, writer)
- New Town Killers (2008) (director, writer)
- A Woman in Winter (2006) (director, writer)
- The Purifiers (2004) (director, writer)
- 16 Years of Alcohol (2003) (director, writer)

Shorts

- I Think You Need a Lawyer (2012)
- The Journey (2009)
- Am I Digital (2009)
- Arab Strap: Speed-Date (2005 music video)

Other

- Heartlands (2002) (co-writer, producer)
- Tube Tales (1999) (producer, actor)
- The Skids Live 2010 (Skids reunion documentary)
