= West Ham United F.C. supporters =

Supporters of association football club

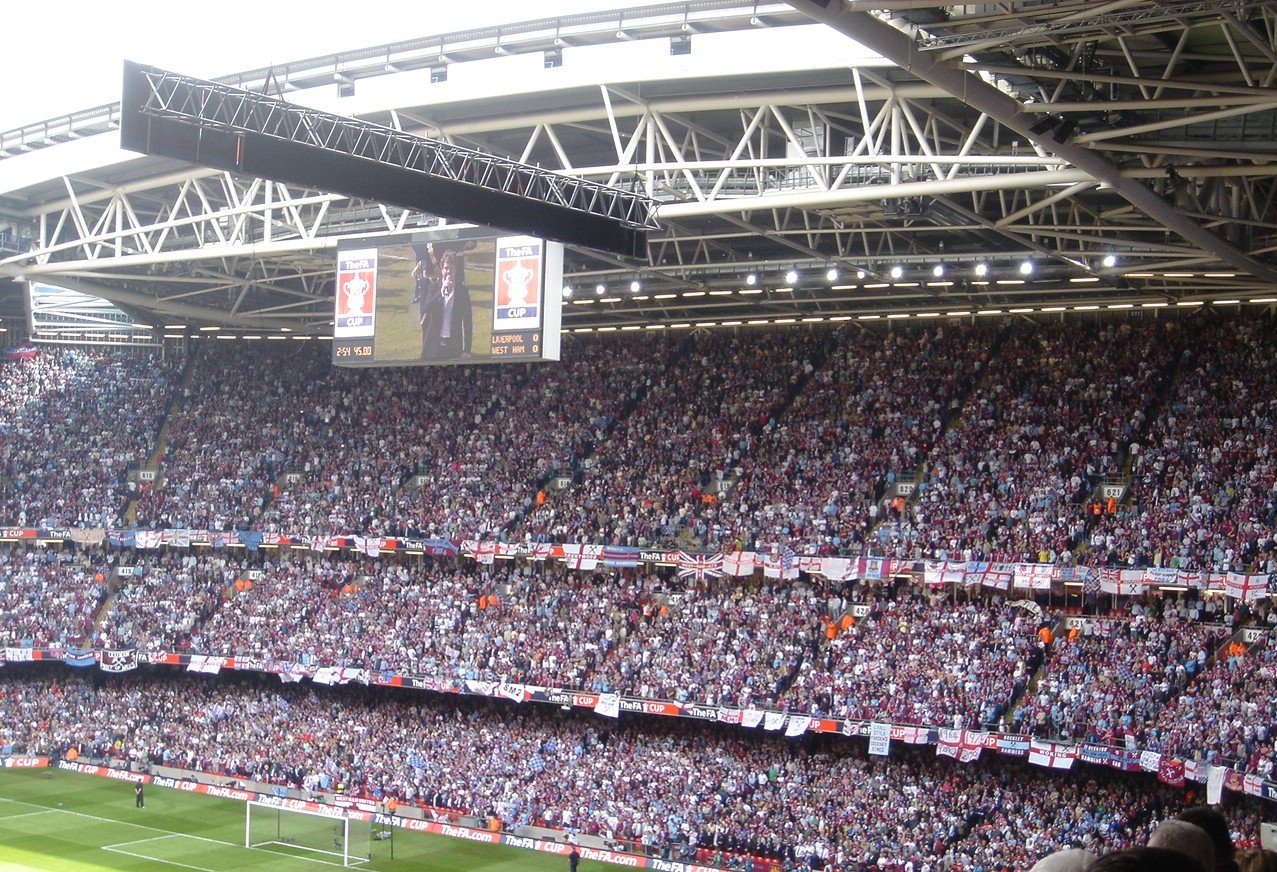
West Ham United supporters

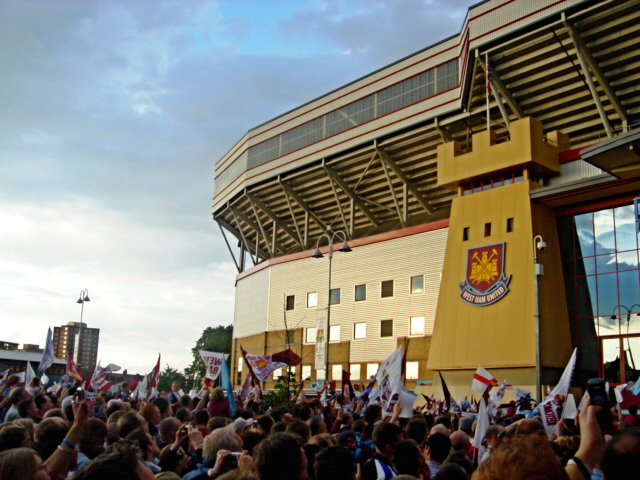
West Ham fans outside Upton Park

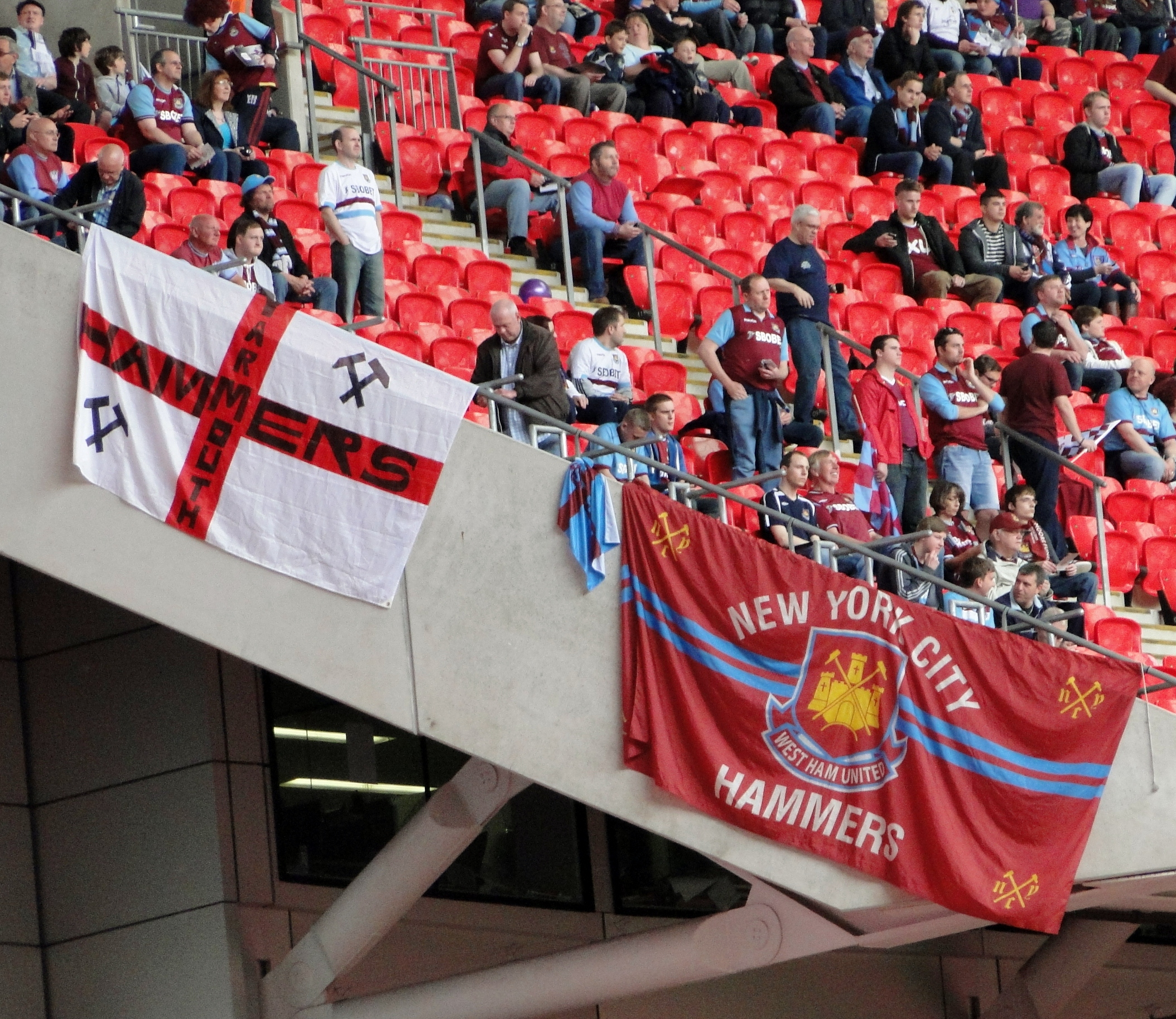
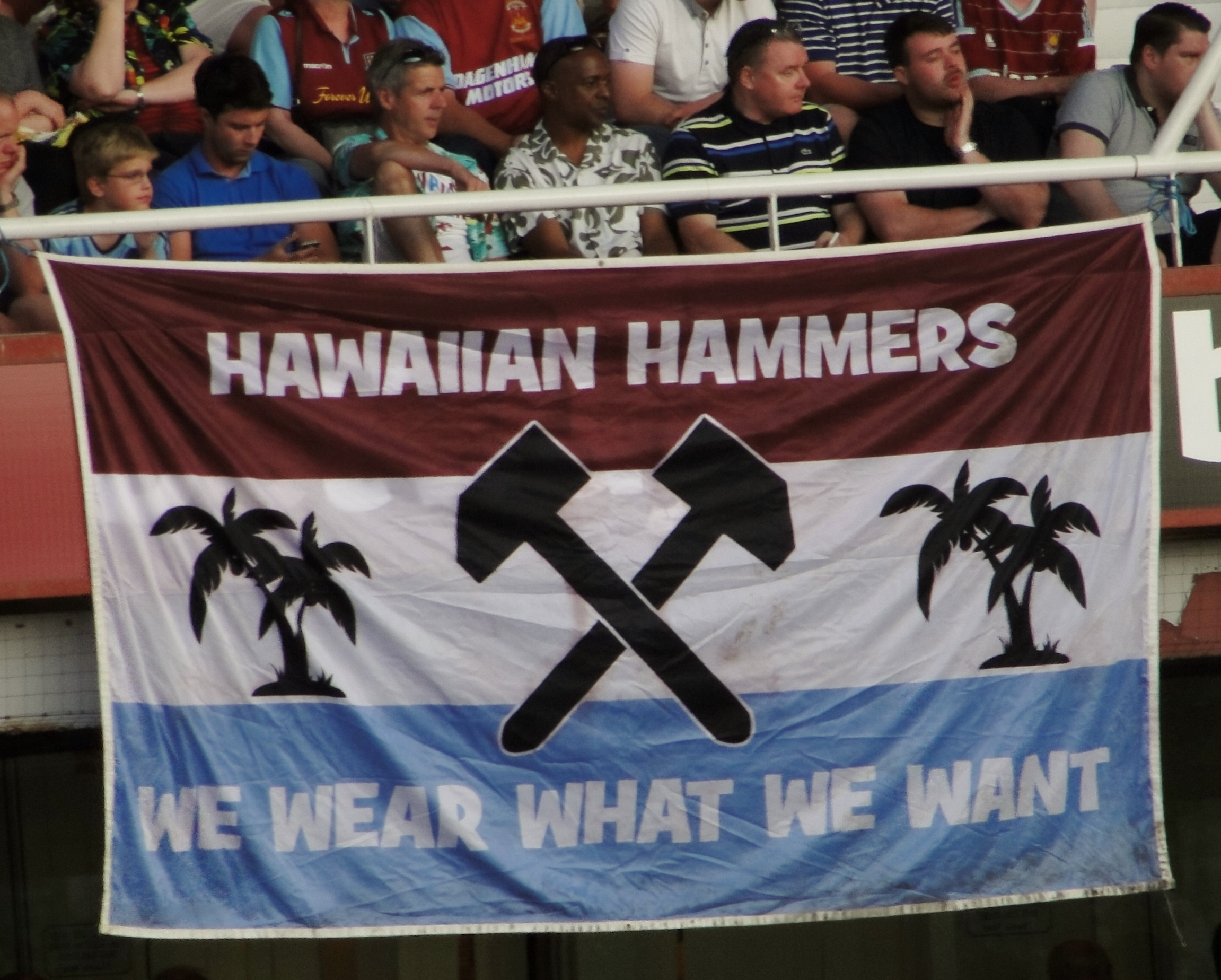
International Supporters' banners

West Ham United F.C. supporters, commonly known as Hammers, are the followers of the London-based West Ham United Football Club, who were founded as Thames Ironworks in 1895. There are 700,000 fans on the club's database and over 2,300,000 likes on Facebook. The club's website is in the top ten most visited websites for English football clubs by people in the USA. Their fans are also associated with a once-notorious hooligan element and have long-standing rivalries with several other clubs, most notably Millwall.

== Geography ==
Traditionally, West Ham fans are drawn from East London, Essex and nearby areas; however, there are fans clubs around the world, notably in New York City, Barcelona, Tenerife, Serbia, Australia, New Zealand, and Scandinavia, which has over 800 members.

== Demographics ==
West Ham have a larger than average number of male fans.

West Ham is the only club in the borough of Newham and a majority of fans in the borough support West Ham.

Their home match average attendance over the last six seasons was in excess of 33,000 per season and despite finishing in bottom place in the Premier League for the 2010–11 season, their home attendance averaged 33,426, eleventh highest of all Premier League clubs.

== Songs ==
In addition to the usual English football chants, West Ham fans sing "I'm Forever Blowing Bubbles". The song is considered to be the club's anthem.

Songs and chants have also been created and sung for players, including Paolo Di Canio, Christian Dailly, Bobby Zamora, Frank Lampard Pop Robson, Dimitri Payet and Luděk Mikloško.

== Heroes and villains ==
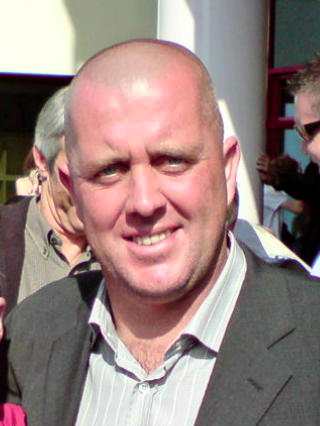
Fan favourite, Julian Dicks

West Ham fans have identified several players over the years as being 'fan favourites', notably Paolo Di Canio, Bobby Moore, Julian Dicks and Carlos Tevez.

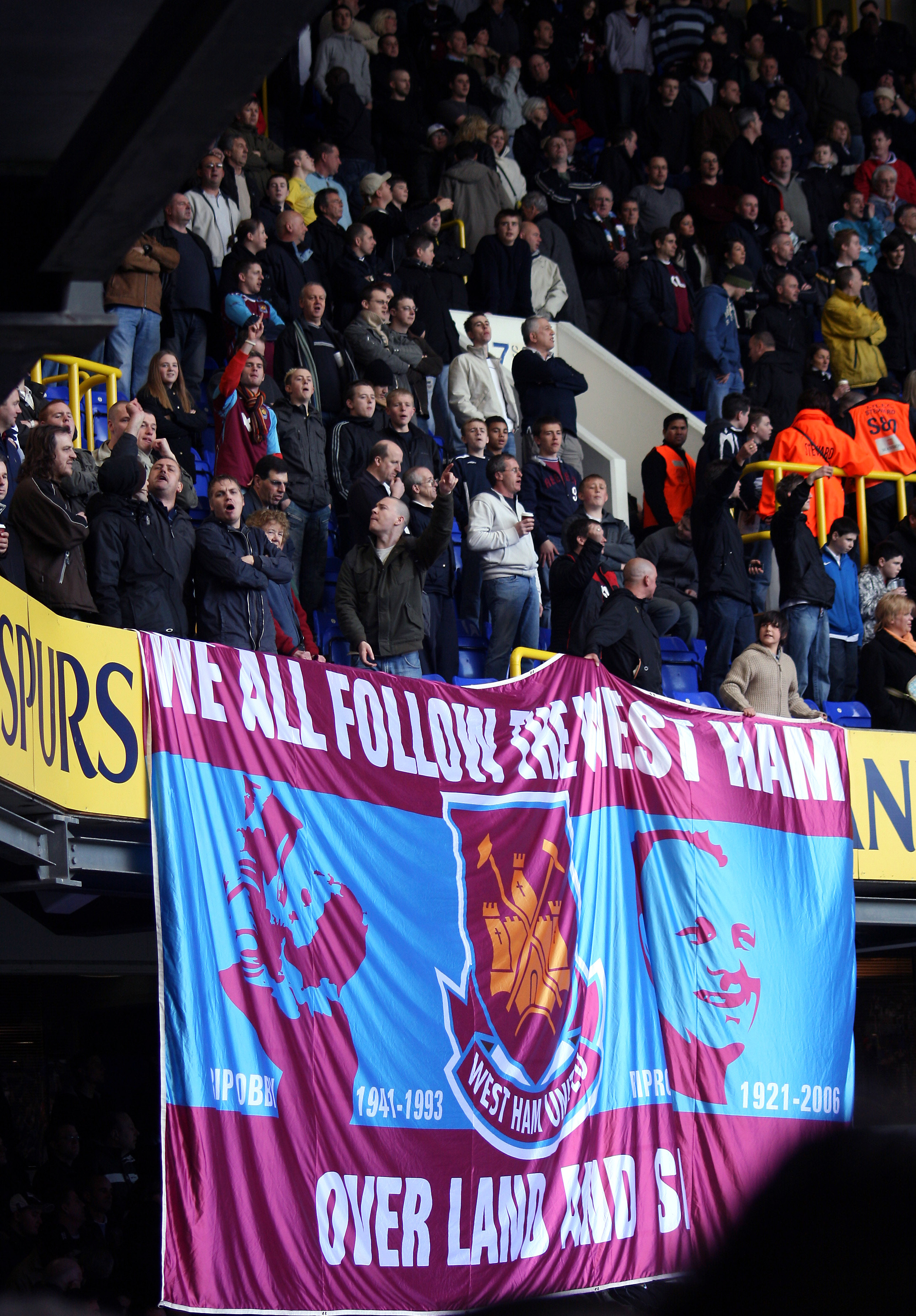
West Ham fans at White Hart Lane

West Ham fans have barracked former players who are perceived to have abandoned the club, or performed some disservice. Famously Dimitri Payet as well as Paul Ince, Frank Lampard, Jermain Defoe, and Nigel Reo-Coker have borne the brunt of verbal abuse and a hostile reception at Upton Park and now London Stadium.

However, players such as Joe Cole, Michael Carrick, Rio Ferdinand, Bobby Zamora and Carlos Tévez receive applause and even standing ovations in honour of their contributions for the club.

== Rivalries ==
West Ham fans' longest-running rivalry is with Millwall fans with both sets of supporters considering the other as their main rival.

The rivalry between Millwall and West Ham has always been a fierce encounter, from the first meeting – a 'friendly' on 23 September 1897, which the newly formed Thames Ironworks (not yet known as West Ham) lost 2–0 – up until their most recent meeting in a Championship clash in February 2012.

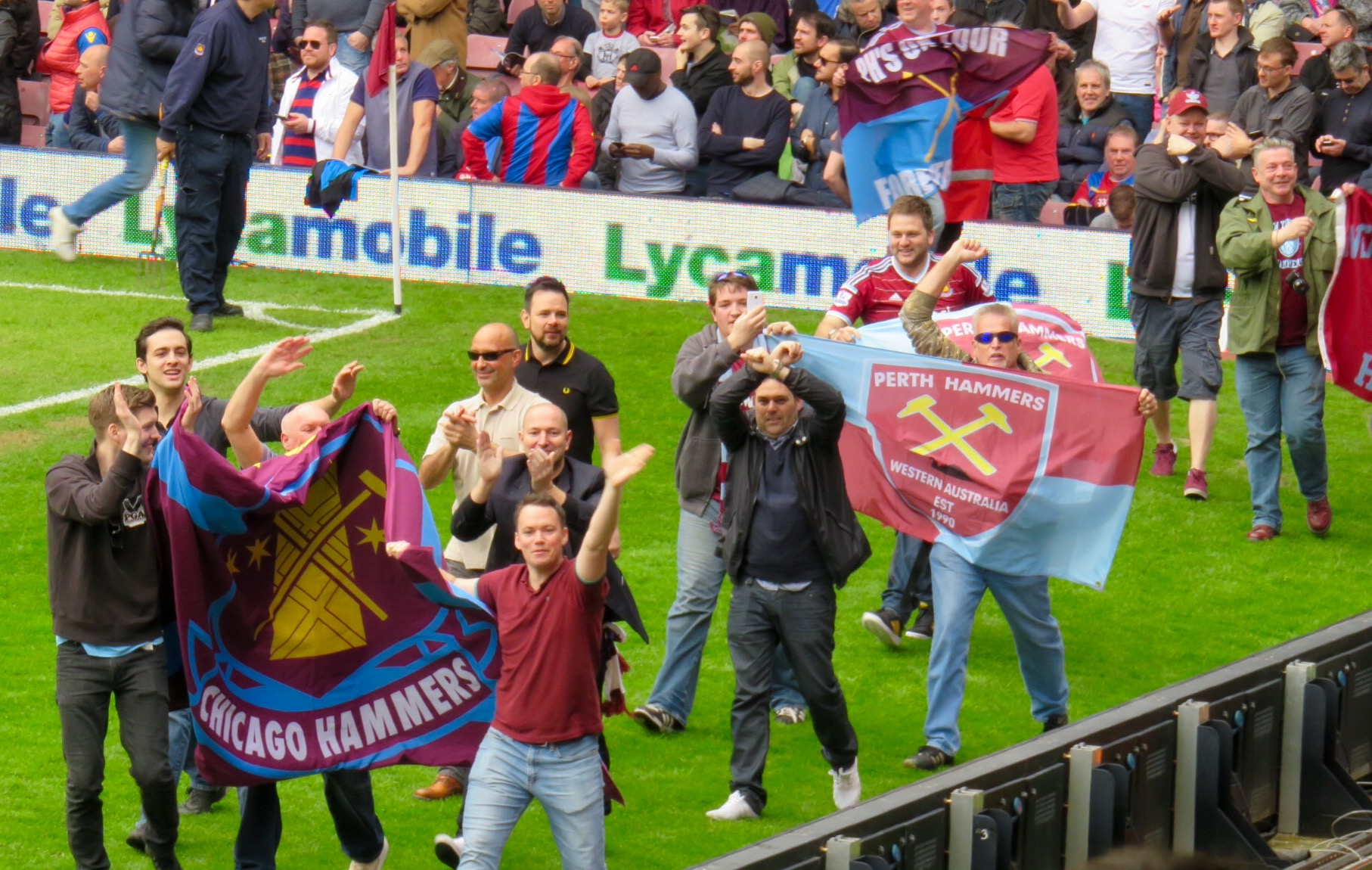
International supporters in 2016

On 17 September 1906 in a Western League game, a particularly ferocious encounter saw one player hurled against a metal advertising board and others being stretchered off following heavy tackles. The East Ham Echo reported: "From the very first kick of the ball it was seen likely to be some trouble, but the storm burst when Dean and Jarvis came into collision (Millwall had two players sent off during the match). This aroused considerable excitement among the spectators. The crowds on the bank having caught the fever, free fights were plentiful."

In 1972, a testimonial for Millwall defender Harry Cripps was marred by intense fighting between the two club's "firms", groups of hooligans intent on violence.

Millwall and West Ham United (Boleyn Ground), separated by the River Thames, are just under 5 miles apart.

Four years later, a Millwall supporter, Ian Pratt, died at New Cross station after falling out of a train during a fight with West Ham fans. Leaflets were later distributed at Millwall's home matches bearing the words: "A West Ham fan must die to avenge him".

During a League Cup game on 25 August 2009, violent clashes transpired between the two sets of supporters' outside Upton Park. Police estimated hundreds of fans were involved. Millwall supporter Alan Baker was stabbed and left fighting for his life. The pitch was invaded three times by West Ham supporters, causing play to be suspended. The Football Association charged both clubs, investigated the aftermath and eventually fined West Ham £115,000. They were found to have failed to ensure their fans refrained from violent, threatening, obscene and provocative behaviour and from entering the field of play. Millwall were cleared of all charges.

Violence among fans at matches between the two clubs can become so intense that there have been calls to never again allow games between the two in cup competitions and that any future league games be played behind closed doors.

Matches against other London sides, such as Chelsea and Tottenham Hotspur are also derbies and violence has occurred between fans although the rivalry is not as intense as that between West Ham and Millwall.

== Traditions ==
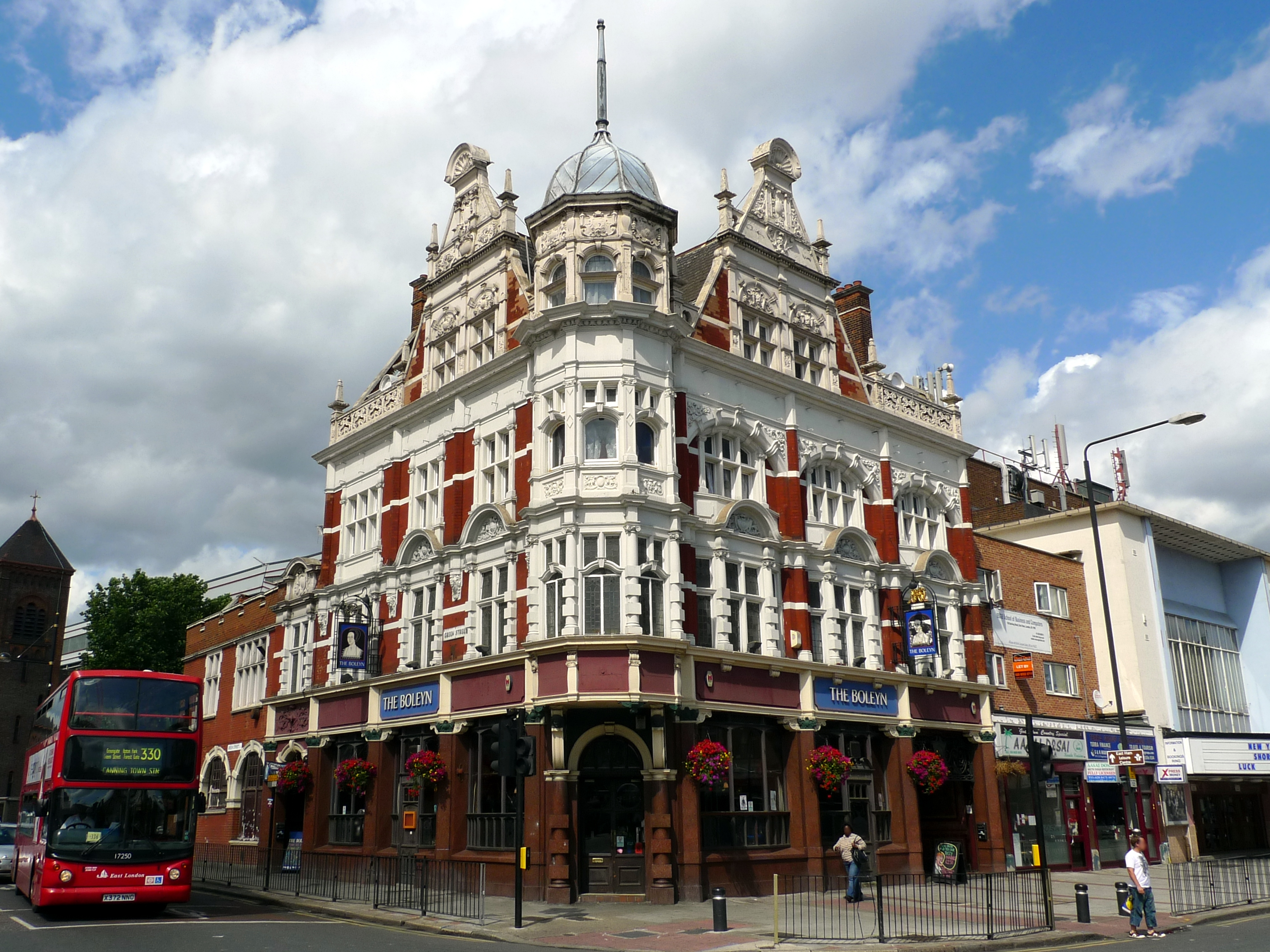
The Boleyn public house on the corner of Green St and Barking Road

West Ham's ground is currently in Stratford, East London. Previously they played at the Boleyn Ground, near the junction of Green Street and the Barking Road in Newham. At the junction is the Boleyn Tavern, a public house traditionally used by West Ham fans on match days. Visiting fans have been made unwelcome and violence has occurred in this area. Due to its proximity to the ground and its use by West Ham fans, the pub has often been boarded-up before and after games with clubs who have a rivalry with West Ham.

=== Fanzines ===
Starting in the late 1980s there have been many fanzines aimed at West Ham fans. These have included The Cockney Pride, The EastEnd Connection, The Loyal Supporter, UTD United, The Boleyn Scorcher, Never Mind the Boleyn, Forever Blowing Bubbles, Ultimate Truth, We Ate All the Pies, Fortunes Always Hiding, The Ultimate Dream, On a Mission From God, The Water in Majorca, On the Terraces and Over Land and Sea.

== Politics ==
A YouGov poll from 2014 found that West Ham supporters lean right politically. However, Stratford, where the club is based, is a left-wing area that traditionally votes Labour (but has an increasing vote for the Green Party), however 39% of the club's fans are based in the East of England, which predominantly votes for the Conservative Party.

== Hooliganism ==
Certain factions of West Ham's supporters have a tradition of violence and hooliganism, with football hooliganism originating amongst bovver boys in the 1960s. Sympathisers of the National Front handed out National Front leaflets outside Upton Park, particularly following the launch of the National Front youth newspaper Bulldog in 1977, and successfully sold club memorabilia carrying 'NF' slogans and motifs.

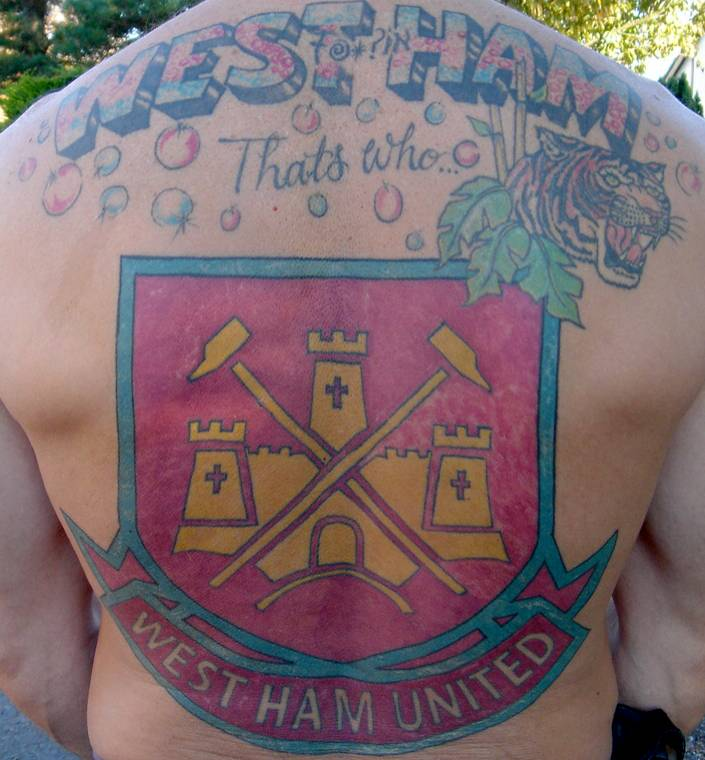
West Ham fan with tattoo

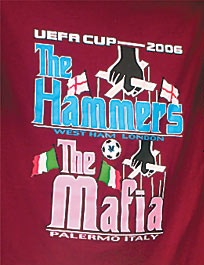
T-shirt with Mafia slogan

The origins of West Ham's links with organised football-related violence started in the 1960s with the establishment of The Mile End Mob (named after a particularly tough area of the East End of London).

During the 1970s and 1980s (the main era for organised football-related violence), West Ham gained further notoriety for the levels of hooliganism in their fan base and antagonistic behaviour towards both their own and rival fans, and the police. During the 1970s in particular, rival groups of West Ham fans from neighbouring areas (most often groups from the districts of Barking and Dagenham) often fought each other at games.

In 1980 the club were forced to play their Cup Winners Cup game against Castilla behind closed doors to an empty ground after fans rioted at the away leg of the tie in the Bernabeu. In 1985, five fans were stabbed on a cross-channel ferry to France after fighting involving fans of West Ham, Manchester United and Everton.

In 2006, twenty West Ham fans appeared in an Italian court following their arrest after fights with rival supporters in Sicily before and after West Ham's game against Palermo in the away leg of their 2006–07 UEFA Cup game. At the home leg fans had bought T-shirts bearing the slogan "the Mafia" – a reference to Sicily being the home of the Cosa Nostra. This was seen as antagonistic by Palermo fans. Six West Ham fans, six police officers and five locals suffered minor injuries in fighting in Sicily. Rival fans threw bottles and chairs in the city's Teatro Massimo district. 500 people were involved in the brawl and police officers were attacked. It took police in riot gear more than an hour to bring the violence under control. An eyewitness said, "West Ham fans behaved like animals, roaming the streets, bottles in hand searching for anyone to fight". More than 2,500 West Ham fans travelled to Palermo for the game.

=== Inter City Firm ===
Mainly active in the 1970s, 1980s and 1990s, West Ham fans formed the Inter City Firm ('ICF'), an English football hooligan firm associated with the club. They were one of the most feared hooligan 'firms'. The name came from the use of InterCity trains for away games. The ICF were one of the first "casuals", so called because they avoided police supervision by not wearing football-related clothing. Fans' violent activities were not confined to local derbies – the hooligans were content to cause trouble at any game, though nearby teams often bore the brunt. During the 1990s, and to the present day, sophisticated surveillance and policing, coupled with club-supported promotions and community action, have reduced the level of violence, although the rivalry with Millwall, Tottenham Hotspur and Chelsea remains.

=== Protest and pitch invasions ===
West Ham fans have taken part in pitch invasions and protests against the club's board of directors and their perceived financial mismanagement, after poor performances on the pitch or to show disapproval at the sale or purchase of players such as Lee Bowyer. Other notable pitch invasions took place in the 1990s against West Ham's launch of The Hammer's Bond, a debenture which would have forced fans into the purchase of a bond before they could buy a season ticket. In 1992, a post-match demonstration by fans against the scheme and new managing director, Peter Storrie, before a home game against Wimbledon was followed by pitch invasions in home games against Everton and Arsenal. The West Ham board of directors were influenced by the fans' protest and announced that the purchase of a bond would no longer be required in order to buy a season ticket. Of 19,301 bonds originally available less than 1,000 were sold.

Mass protests also took place at West Ham's home game against Burnley in 2018 to protest against the lack of investment from the board. Four fans entered the pitch during play, one of whom carried the corner flag to the centre circle, and roughly 200 fans gathered around the directors box, aiming their anger at the joint chairmen David Sullivan and David Gold, both of whom were later escorted away. During the 2019–20 season, 900 supporters protested against the club's board ahead of a 1–1 draw against Everton. On 29 February 2020, 2,500 supporters staged a protest march along the Greenway in Newham, once again protesting against Sullivan, Gold and Karren Brady's ownership of the club.

West Ham won the UEFA Europa Conference League final against Fiorentina at the Fortuna Arena in Prague. After the game Fiorentina president, Rocco Commisso described West Ham as treating Fiorentina players "like animals" after Luka Jović came off at half-time with a broken nose and Cristiano Biraghi received a bloodied face after being hit by an object thrown by West Ham supporters. UEFA later charged both clubs with "throwing of objects" with West Ham being charged with "invasion of the field of play" and Fiorentina being charged with the "lighting of fireworks". West Ham supporters were banned from attending the club's first away fixture of their 2023-24 Europa League campaign. The club was also fined €50,000 after supporters threw objects onto the pitch and a further €8,000 for a pitch invasion following the game. Fiorentina were given a one-match ban for away supporters and were fined €30,000. For the 2022–23 season, West Ham supporters topped the table for football-related arrests in England and Wales. 27 arrests of West Ham fans were for public disorder, and another 23 were for throwing missiles.

== Supporters' groups ==
=== By country ===
Number of officially recognised supporters' groups by country
Country	Clubs
Algeria	1
Argentina	1
Aruba	1
Australia	5
Austria	1
Bahamas	1
Belgium	2
Brazil	2
Bulgaria	1
Canada	3
Cayman Islands	1
Chile	1
China	1
Colombia	1
Czech Republic	1 (Note: The Czech Republic and Slovakia share a supporters' group.)
Egypt	1
France	1
Germany	3
Ghana	2
Hong Kong	1
India	1
Iran	1
Ireland	3
Israel	2
Italy	3
Jamaica	1
Jersey	1
Kenya	1
Kyrgyzstan	1
Lithuania	1
Macau	1
Malaysia	1
Malta	1
Mexico	1
Morocco	1
New Zealand	2
Nigeria	1
Peru	1
Poland	1
Portugal	2
Slovakia	1
South Africa	2
South Korea	1
Spain	3
Switzerland	1
Thailand	1
Tunisia	2
Ukraine	1
United Arab Emirates	1
United Kingdom	9
United States	38

== In popular culture ==
West Ham United is frequently mentioned among the locals at The Queen Victoria tavern in the BBC soap opera EastEnders, created by Tony Holland and Julia Smith. The show is set in the London Borough of Walford, which is a portmanteau of the East End areas of Walthamstow and Stratford. The soap opera focuses on family values and the characters moving in and out of the borough.

The 2005 film Green Street Hooligans (an allusion to the road on which the Boleyn Ground stands) depicted an American student, played by Elijah Wood, becoming involved with a fictional firm associated with West Ham, with an emphasis on the rivalry with Millwall. Although they originally allowed filming inside West Ham's ground, the directors of West Ham withdrew their permission once they became aware of the violent content of the film.

West Ham hooliganism was again highlighted in the 2008 film Cass, based on the life of well-known former hooligan Cass Pennant.

West Ham is the only football club referenced in J. K. Rowling's Harry Potter series.

West Ham played a prominent role in the American television show Ted Lasso, where character Nate Shelley manages the club.

== London Stadium ==
Following the building of the London Stadium in Stratford, London for the 2012 Summer Olympics West Ham United put forward proposals which would see the club leave their Boleyn Ground location and relocate to Stratford. On 22 March 2013, West Ham secured a 99-year lease deal, with the stadium planned to be used as their home ground from the 2016–2017 season. West Ham United supporters backed these proposals with 85% in favour of a move in a poll conducted by YouGov, in May 2013.

== List of notable supporters ==
Below is a list of people who are known West Ham United supporters:

Name	Occupation	Reference
Nicola Adams	Former boxer	
Ade Adepitan	TV presenter	
Kriss Akabusi	Former athlete	
David Amess	Politician	
Rachel Anderson	Football agent	
Michael Apted	Film director	
Dave Bautista	Actor/Wrestler	
Behzinga	YouTuber	
Conor Benn	Boxer	
Nick Berry	Actor	
Jamie Borthwick	Actor	
Lee Bowyer	Former footballer	
Billy Bragg	Singer	
Russell Brand	Actor	
Russ Bray	Darts referee	
Trevor Brooking	Football commentator/ Former footballer	
Frank Bruno	Former boxer	
Des Cahill	Sportscaster	
Todd Carty	Actor	
Roger Chapman	Golfer	
Amy Childs	Actress	
Rylan Clark	TV personality	
Lee Clayton	Journalist	
John Cleese	Actor/Comedian	
Cockney Rejects	Group	
Frankie Cocozza	Singer	
Carlton Cole	Former footballer	
Robert Coles	Golfer	
Phil Collen	Singer	
Tony Conquest	Former boxer	
Nat Coombs	TV presenter	
James Corden	Comedian	
Tony Cottee	Football commentator/ Former footballer	
Danny Cowley	Football coach	
Ian Crocker	Football commentator	
David Croft	Broadcaster	
Matt Damon	Actor	
Tom Davis	Actor/Comedian	
Simon Day	Actor	
Olivia Dean	Singer	
Jermain Defoe	Former footballer	
Paul Di'Anno	Singer	
Richard Digance	Comedian/Musician	
Dizzee Rascal	Rapper	
Frank Dobson	Politician	
Danny Dyer	Actor	
George Earthy	Footballer	
Noel Edmonds	TV presenter	
David Eldridge	Playwright	
Darren Emerson	DJ	
David Essex	Singer	
Sebastian Faulks	Novelist	
Perry Fenwick	Actor	
Anton Ferdinand	Former footballer	
Tony Fernandes	Businessman	
Jim Fitzpatrick	Politician	
Tom Fletcher	Former diplomat	
Keith Flint	Singer	
Nick Frost	Actor	
Mike Gapes	Politician	
Bill Gardner	Football hooligan	
David Gold	Businessman	
Jacqueline Gold	Businesswoman	
Gennady Golovkin	Boxer	
Graham Gooch	Former cricketer	
Len Goodman	Dancer	
Leslie Grantham	Actor	
Dave Grohl	Musician	
Tony Grounds	Playwright	
Ricky Grover	Actor/Comedian	
Sally Gunnell	Former athlete	
Guvna B	Rapper	
Martin Hancock	Actor	
Steve Harris	Musician	
Chesney Hawkes	Singer	
Tony Hayward	Businessman	
Jonjo Heuerman	Charity fundraiser	
Alfred Hitchcock	Film director	
Dean Holdsworth	Former footballer & manager	
Billy Horschel	Golfer	
Mark Hunter	Former rower	
JaackMaate	YouTuber	
Maya Jama	TV presenter	
Fred Jarvis	Trade union leader	
Derek Jarman	Artist	
Sonny Jay	Singer	
Chris Jericho	Wrestler/Singer	
Louisa Johnson	Singer	
Eddie Jones	Rugby union coach	
Phill Jupitus	Comedian	
King Olav V	Monarch	
Mark Kaylor	Former boxer	
Ross Kemp	Actor	
Kofi Kingston	Wrestler	
Keira Knightley	Actress	
Paul Konchesky	Former footballer	
Kosmo Vinyl	Record producer	
Jeremy Kyle	Broadcaster	
Andy Lapthorne	Wheelchair tennis player	
Damian Lazarus	DJ	
Carlton Leach	Former criminal	
Lennox Lewis	Former boxer	
Matthew Lorenzo	TV presenter	
Pixie Lott	Singer	
Kenny Lynch	Singer	
Vera Lynn	Singer	
Dorothy Manley	Former sprinter	
Jimi Manuwa	Former mixed martial artist	
David Martin	Footballer	
Felipe Massa	Racing driver	
Paul McGinley	Golfer	
MC Hammer	Rapper	
Tony McNulty	Politician	
Alex Mendham	Singer	
Seth Meyers	Comedian/TV host	
Daniel Middleton	YouTuber and streamer	
Helen Mirren	Actress	
Kevin Mitchell	Former boxer	
Francesco Molinari	Golfer	
John Moncur	Former footballer	
Stephen Moyer	Actor	
Jim Munro	Journalist	
Glen Murphy	Actor	
Billy Murray	Actor	
Derek Murray	TV presenter	
Dawn Neesom	Journalist	
Jeremy Nicholas	Broadcaster	
Mark Noble	Former footballer	
Barack Obama	President	
Christine Ohuruogu	Track and field athlete	
One Pound Fish Man	Fishmonger	
Gary O'Sullivan	Boxer	
Cass Pennant	Author and former hooligan	
Katy Perry	Singer	
Jamie Porter	Cricketer	
Paul Prichard	Former cricketer	
Queen Elizabeth II	Monarch	^{a}
Tony Rivers	Singer	
Seth Rollins	Wrestler	
Jack Rowan	Actor	
Logan Sama	Grime DJ	
Bobby Seagull	Mathematician	
Jonjo Shelvey	Footballer	
Ben Shephard	TV presenter	
Teddy Sheringham	Former footballer	
Steel Banglez	Record producer	
Kevin Stephens	Former footballer	
David Sullivan	Businessman	
Sammie Szmodics	Footballer	
Michael Tabor	Businessman	
Kevin Tebbit	Civil servant	
Carlos Tevez	Former footballer	
Dominic Thiem	Tennis player	
Stephen Timms	Politician	
Peta Todd	Glamour model	
Susannah Townsend	Field hockey player	
Triple H	Wrestler	
Robin Wales	Politician	
Alex Walkinshaw	Actor	
Tommy Walsh	TV personality	
Tony Way	Actor/Comedian	
Mark Webster	Broadcaster	
Irvine Welsh	Novelist	
Danniella Westbrook	Former actress	
Ellen White	Former footballer	
Jack Wilshere	Former footballer	
Ray Winstone	Actor	
Elijah Wood	Actor	
Jackson Wray	Rugby union player	
Elliott Wright	TV personality	
Mark Wright	TV personality	
Bobby Zamora	Former footballer	
Hero Fiennes Tiffin	Actor	

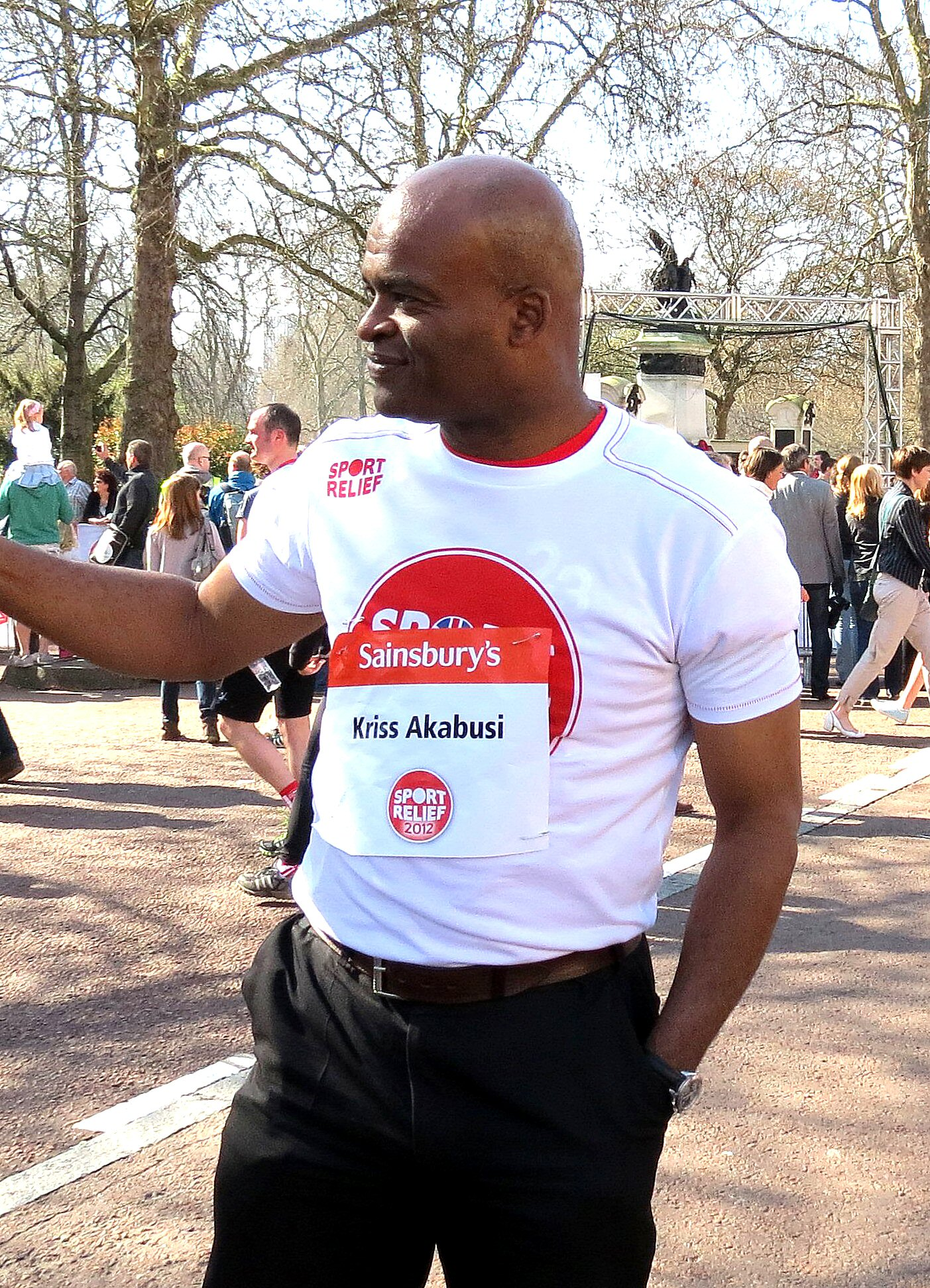
Kriss Akabusi

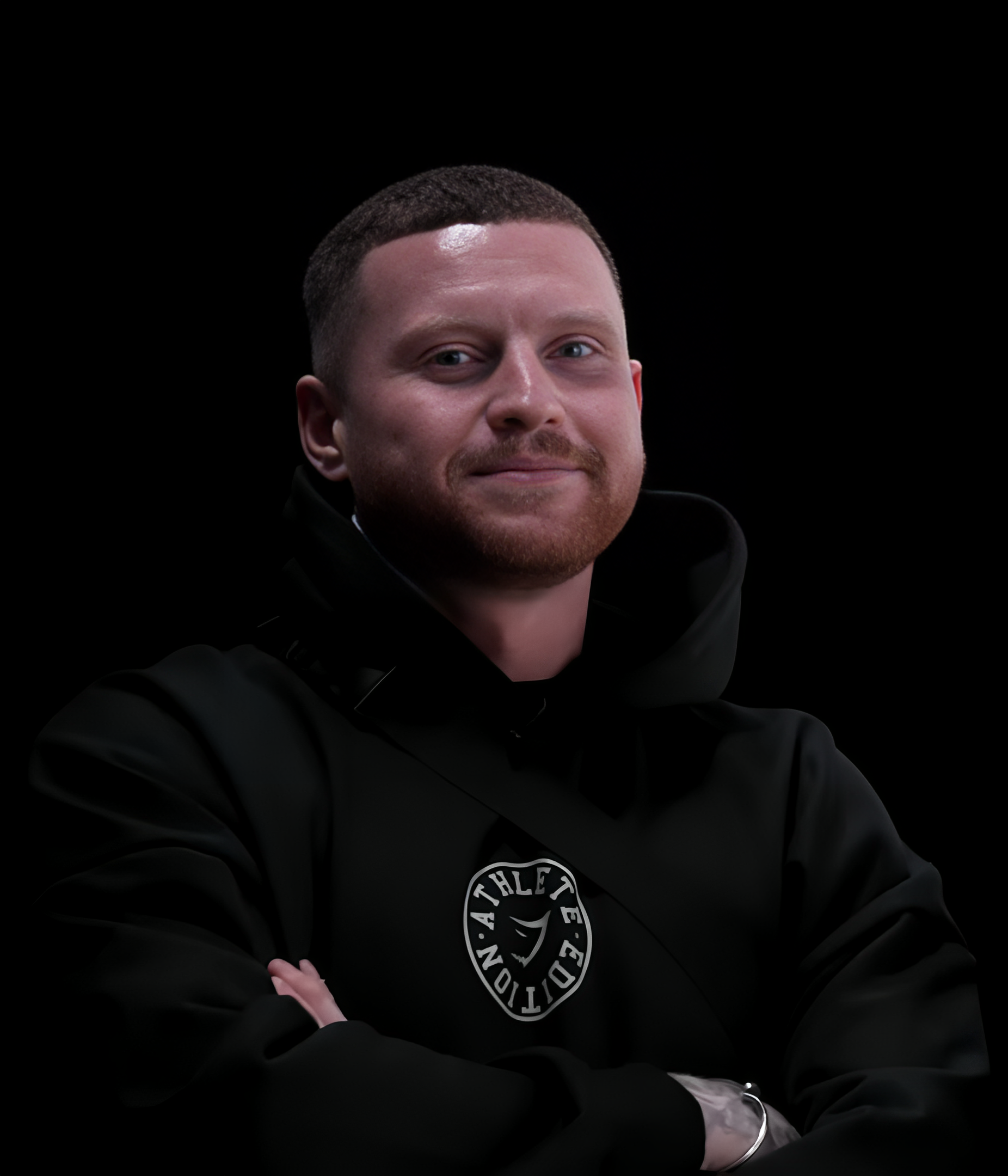
Behzinga

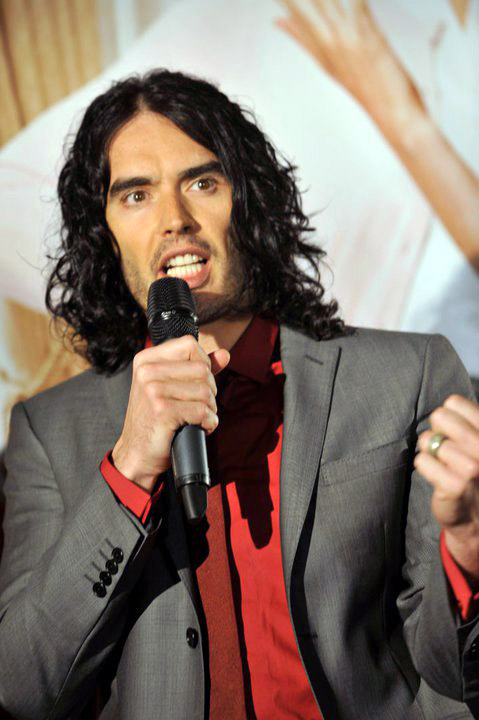
Russell Brand

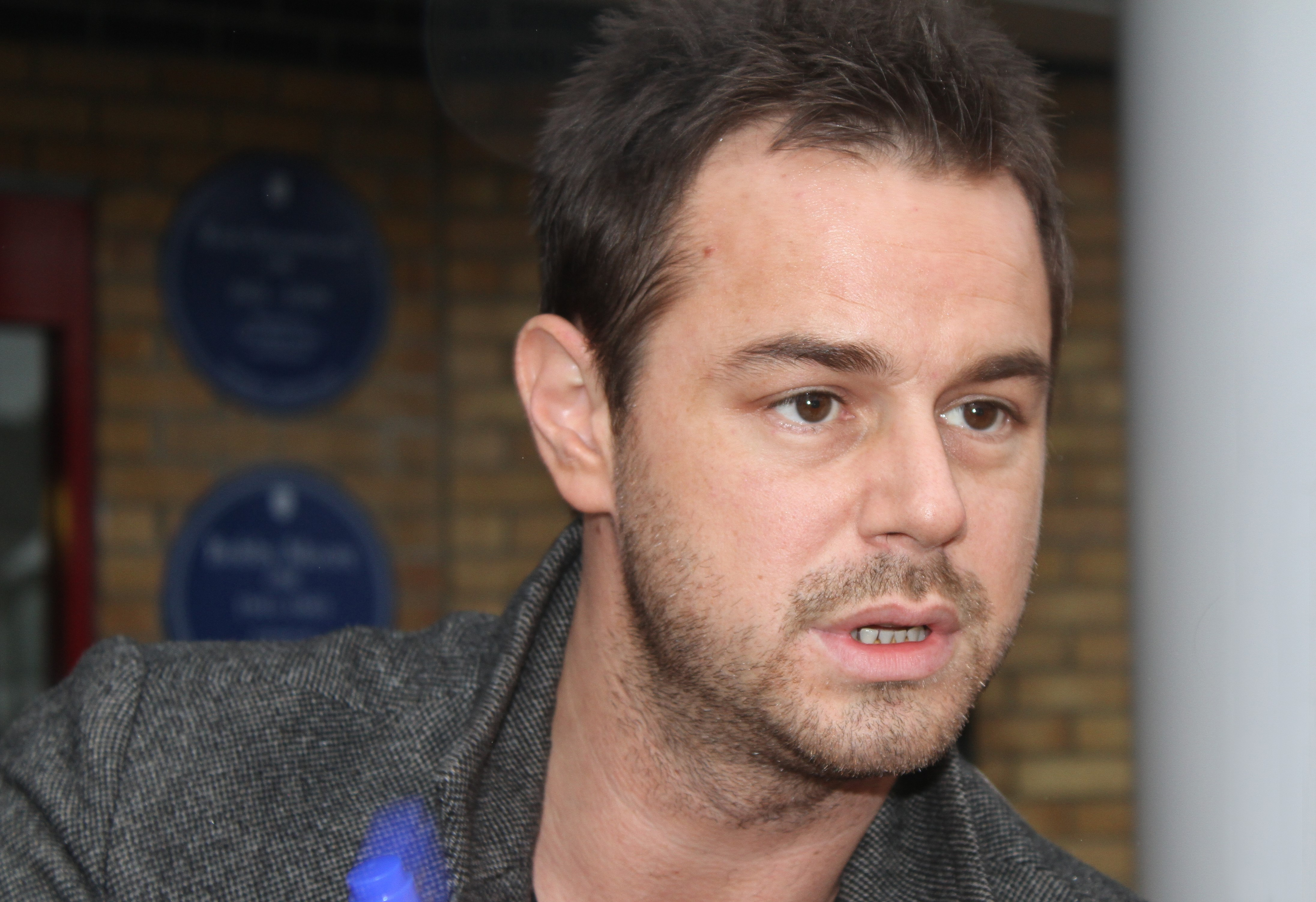
Danny Dyer

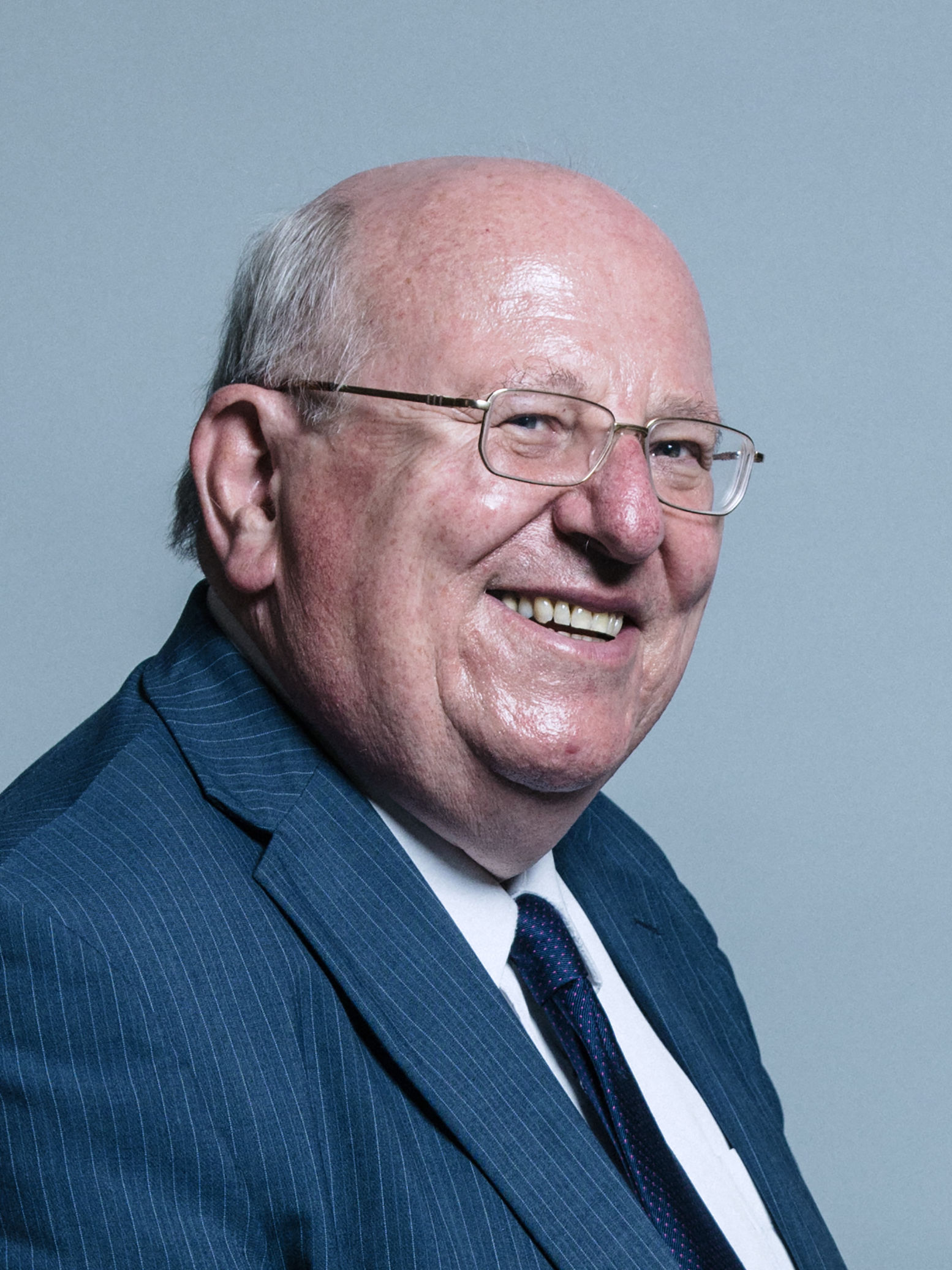
Mike Gapes

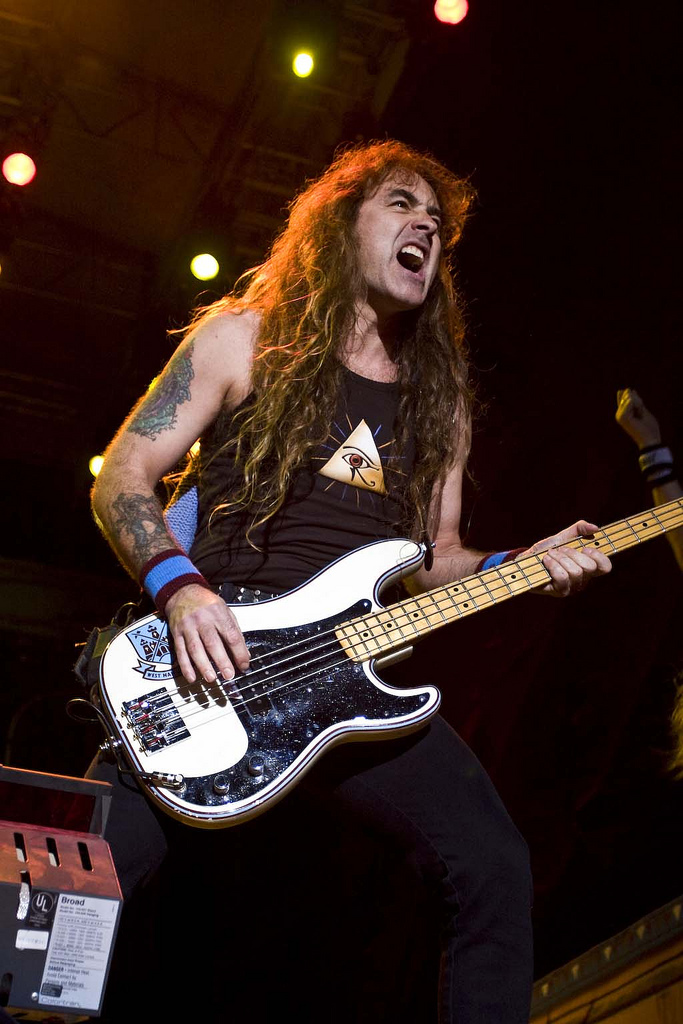
Steve Harris

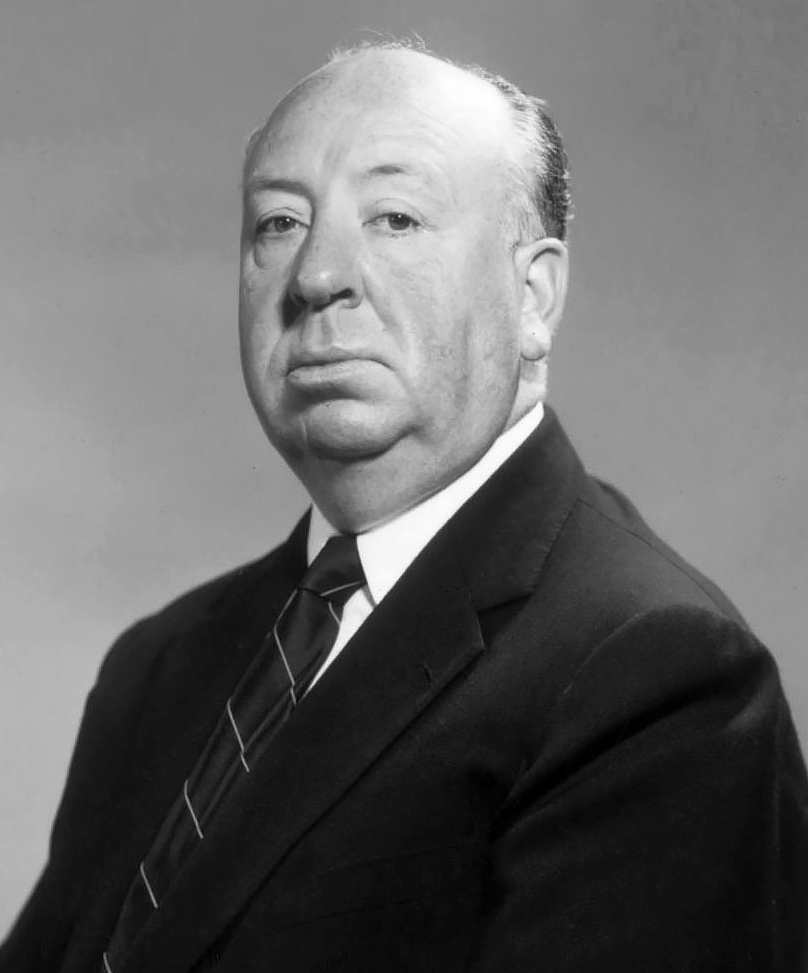
Alfred Hitchcock

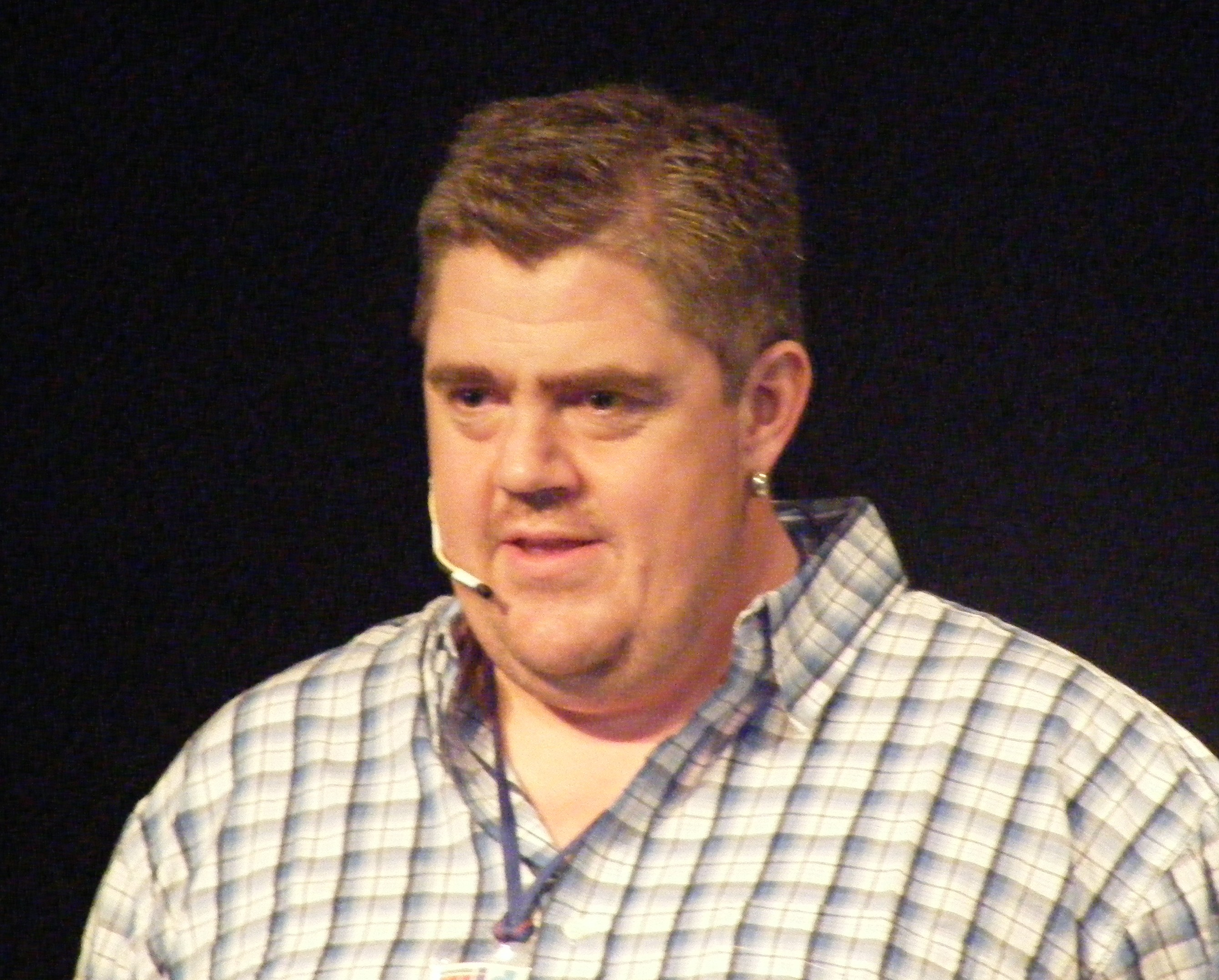
Phill Jupitus

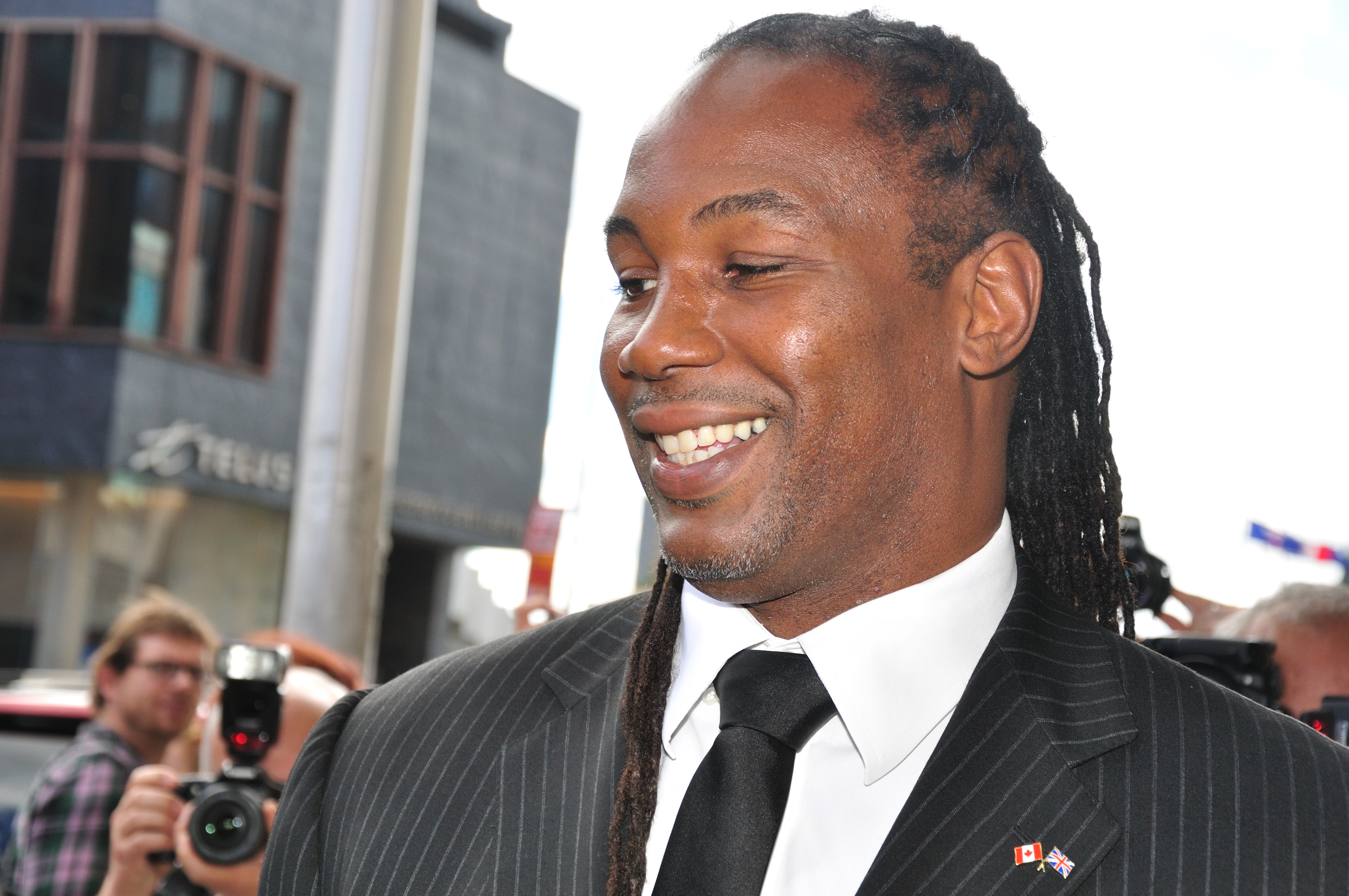
Lennox Lewis

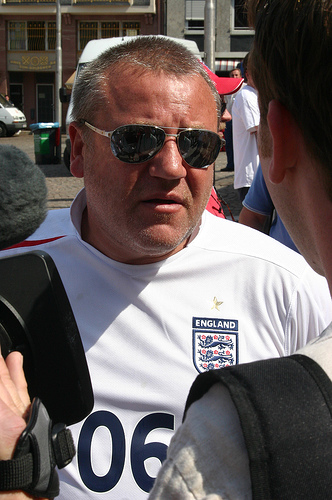
Ray Winstone

== Notes ==
- ^ Note a: Other sources cite her as being a fan of Arsenal.
- ^ Note b: Other sources cite him as once being a fan of Arsenal.
