= Tom Gutteridge =

English television director

Thomas Michael Gillan Gutteridge (born 1952) is a British television director, producer and executive. He was formerly chief executive of FremantleMedia NA, having previously been founder and chief executive of Mentorn, from 1985 to 2001. In 2016 he was appointed executive producer of the television series BattleBots, which, after two seasons on ABC, in 2018 moved to the Discovery and Science Channels. He started his career as a BBC journalist.

== Early life and education ==
Thomas Michael Gillan Gutteridge was born in London in 1952, the son of a food technologist, and moved to Tyneside when he was five.

He was educated at Priory School Tynemouth, Newcastle Royal Grammar School and the University of York, where he studied English and philosophy.

== Career ==
=== BBC ===
Gutteridge started his career as a BBC journalist, joining as a news trainee, and initially worked at Radio Derby, and in the Newcastle newsroom. He was later a producer and director on Nationwide, Tonight and Panorama. On 11 April 1978, he directed the first Budget Special programme to use live sound from the House of Commons. In 1979 he became producer of the weekly Tonight in Town, hosted by Valerie Singleton and Michael Billington. In 1983 he was seconded from the BBC's Music & Arts department to direct the BBC's General Election coverage.

In 1980 Gutteridge moved to Music & Arts department as executive producer, where he was responsible for the twice-weekly Russell Harty chat shows. In 1982, he produced and directed the comedy sketch series A Kick Up the Eighties, which discovered the talents of Rik Mayall (as Kevin Turvey) and Tracey Ullman, and which won a Scottish BAFTA. In 1983 and 1984, he produced and directed the BBC1 dance series The Hot Shoe Show, starring Wayne Sleep and Bonnie Langford, which in 1984 was nominated for a BAFTA as Best Light Entertainment Series.

=== Freelance ===
==== TV and film ====
In 1984 he took leave of absence from the BBC to direct and produce the film of the Andrew Lloyd Webber musical Song & Dance.

In December 1985 he co-produced and directed the dance special Dash, with Wayne Sleep.

On 21 October 1985 he directed Blue Suede Shoes, a Rockabilly Special with Carl Perkins, which starred Eric Clapton, Ringo Starr and George Harrison, Dave Edmunds, Rosanne Cash, Lee Rocker and Slim Jim Phantom.

In December 1985 he directed the ITV documentary Sixty Tiny Fingers about the Walton sextuplets.

In 1986 Gutteridge wrote and directed the ice ballet Fire and Ice, starring Jayne Torvill and Christopher Dean for ITV, which won the Bronze Rose at Montreux, and also Best Director at the International Monitor Awards. It was broadcast on ITV on Boxing Day 1986.

==== Opera and ballet ====
The following year, Gutteridge wrote and directed the ITV ice ballet Sleeping Beauty, with Robin Cousins, which also won Best Director at the International Monitor Awards. Also in 1987 he directed a film of the Ravel opera 'L'Enfant et Les Sortileges' at Glyndebourne, conducted by Simon Rattle.

In 1990, he directed the full-length David Bintley ballet Hobson's Choice with the Birmingham Royal Ballet.

In 1991 Gutteridge directed an hour-long comedy special for ITV Lenny Go Home with Lenny Henry.

=== Mentorn ===
In 1985 Gutteridge founded the production company Mentorn (originally called Mentorn Films), and his early productions included the BBC1 documentary The Golden Gong (1987). In 1988 he produced and directed the ITV documentary about the animator Richard Williams, I Drew Roger Rabbit, which won an International Emmy nomination for Best Arts Documentary in 1989.

From 1987, the firm produced a number of weekly arts magazine series for ITV regional companies, including 01-for London for Thames TV, which was hosted by Richard Jobson, Neil Mullarkey, Mark Webster and Paula Yates, First Night for Central, Wideangle for Anglia, as well as the daily Box Office for Channel 4. It also produced the ITV weekly magazine Hollywood Report. By 1991, Mentorn had become Britain's largest independent television production company.

From 1989 to 1995 Mentorn produced and directed the entertainment series Challenge Anneka for BBC1, with Anneka Rice, which won the Bronze Rose at Montreux in 1991. The first series was broadcast from 8 September 1989 on Friday evenings on BBC1, and in 1990 the series moved to Saturday nights and ratings rose to 10 million viewers and was the second most popular show on BBC1.

In 2001 Gutteridge produced and directed a US version of the show for ABC called Challenge America, starring Erin Brockovitch.

In 1991 Mentorn teamed up with Polygram, Working Title and Palace Pictures to form a consortium, London Independent Broadcasting, to bid against LWT for the London weekend ITV franchise. The bid was unsuccessful.

Gutteridge was executive producer of the BBC1 comedy film The Bullion Boys, starring David Jason and Brenda Blethyn, for which he won the 1994 International Emmy Award for Drama.

Other Mentorn productions Gutteridge created and produced included the talent show Star for a Night, with Jane McDonald, which in 2001 discovered the singer Joss Stone. Gutteridge also produced the BBC1 debate series You Decide with Jeremy Paxman and the daily BBC2 news quiz Today's the Day with Martyn Lewis, which ran from 1992 to 1999. Gutteridge was also executive producer of the BBC entertainment series Before They Were Famous.

Gutteridge also produced the first entertainment programme for the new ITV franchise Carlton Television, Surprise Party, broadcast on 1 January 1993.

In 1996 Gutteridge was executive producer of the 24-part Gerry Anderson sci-fi drama series Space Precinct.

In 1995 he created the cult television series Robot Wars for BBC2 and a number of international broadcasters from 1998 until 2002 (a further series was made for Channel Five in 2003), and for which Gutteridge was nominated for a Best Entertainment Programme BAFTA in 1999. Robot Wars first broadcast on BBC2 in February 1998, hosted by Jeremy Clarkson and Philippa Forrester, and a further 5 series were made for BBC2 with Craig Charles, reaching ratings in excess of 4 million viewers. A seventh series was produced for Channel Five. In the United States, a series was produced for the United States (but shot by Mentorn in London) called Robot Wars: Extreme Warriors, hosted by the wrestler Mick Foley. It aired on TNN. A subsequent US series was made for Nickelodeon.

Other key long-running Mentorn productions included Question Time, Traffic Cops and Britain's Worst Driver.

=== The Television Corporation ===
From 1996 Mentorn had acquired other production companies, including the documentary producers Barraclough Carey, and in February 2000 Gutteridge sold the expanded Mentorn Group to The Television Corporation plc. Gutteridge became Group Director of Content and Marketing of the merged group.

In 2003 Gutteridge moved to the United States, where he co-created and produced the Fox network series Paradise Hotel and Forever Eden.

=== FremantleMedia North America ===
In 2003, Gutteridge quit Mentorn and was headhunted by FremantleMedia to become its chief executive officer in North America, where he was responsible for the company's operations in the US and Canada, which included the productions American Idol and The Price Is Right. He resigned from the company in March 2005 for personal reasons.

=== Return to the UK ===
In 2007, Gutteridge returned to the UK and moved with his partner Joanna to Northumberland, where he founded the production company Standing Stone, which has produced a number of entertainment formats, including the quiz show Hot Seat, sold to Debmar Mercury, and the dating show Loveland, sold to Sky, Fox, and a number of other networks in 2008. After commissioning and announcing the series, which was to have been hosted by Cilla Black, Sky cancelled it in 2009.

In 2009, Gutteridge co-wrote with Nigel Dacre the application for the Trinity Mirror and Press Association regional news consortium News 3, which in 2010 won the bid for the regional news pilot for the north east of England. The news pilots were cancelled by the incoming coalition government later in 2010.

In 2013, Standing Stone signed a development deal with the Fox network in the United States for a new entertainment format, The Ideas Factory.

Standing Stone also had a digital division, which developed a revolutionary interactive voting and information app for Channel Four's Dispatches series in 2012, of which Gutteridge was executive producer of 20 episodes. The app was nominated for Innovation of the Year in the British Journalism Awards 2012.

=== Return to US ===
In 2015 Gutteridge returned to the US to work as a Broadcast Consultant and executive producer. He was contracted by BattleBots Inc to be in charge of the international rollout of the hit robot combat show on ABC BattleBots, as executive producer, International. From 2016 he was executive producer of the 3rd, 4th, and 5th seasons of BattleBots for Discovery Channel. He also produced and directed a live BattleBots 3-hour event, which was streamed live on Twitch, for Amazon's re:MARS conference in Las Vegas

=== BattleBots (ABC) ===
In April 2016, Gutteridge launched the international sales rollout of BattleBots by appointing Sky Vision as distributor. They immediately sold the series to a number of international broadcasters, including Spike and Channel 5 in the UK, and Discovery Germany. By October 2016 the series was on air in 150 territories.

== Other roles and activities ==
Gutteridge was elected chair of the Producers Alliance for Cinema and Television (PACT) in 1993, and over the next two years successfully campaigned for a quota for independent regional production, and also started a campaign for tax breaks for the British film industry (which eventually succeeded in 1997).

He was made a Fellow of the Royal Television Society in 1996 and in 1995 gave the 50th anniversary RTS Fleming Memorial Lecture at the Royal Institution on the subject 50 Channels and Nothing On: The Future of British Production. He became Deputy Chair of the Royal Television Society in 1998. He was Chair of Skillset's Northern Media Skills Panel from 2008 to 2012 and in December 2014 became chair of the regional screen agency Northern Film & Media. In 2015 he helped launch the NFM Academy, a training initiative to help North East production personnel get experience of working on high-end drama productions.

== Teesside University ==
In 2008, Gutteridge became visiting professor at Teesside University, where he regularly gives masterclasses and lectures to students in the School of Arts and Media. Since 2007 he has also written a weekly column in The Journal, the daily newspaper covering the Northeast, published by Trinity Mirror.

== Personal life ==
He has 5 children. Gutteridge also has a son with Anneka Rice, born in 1997 following a short relationship.
