= Coyi =

Coyi or COYI may refer to:

- Masixole 'Coyi' Banda, a South African rugby player
- Come On You Irons, a phrase used by West Ham United F.C. supporters
