= Loveland (TV series) =

- Starring: Cilla Black
- Country of origin: United Kingdom

Production
- Running time: 60 mins (inc. comms)

Original release
- Network: Sky1

Loveland is a cancelled British dating game show that was due to be aired on Sky One in 2009.

== Format ==
The show would have been similar to an old dating show, Blind Date but with a 21st-century twist - the contestants would have been hidden behind avatars, created to reflect their alter egos. Cilla Black, former host of Blind Date, had been announced as host for the show.

== Production ==
According to The Guardian, the show would have been produced by Standing Stone Productions, based in Newcastle upon Tyne, UK. Creator was Jo Pine, who was to executive produce together with Tom Gutteridge, former CEO of FremantleMedia North America and founder of UK production company Mentorn.

== Cancellation ==
Despite the fact a pilot show was filmed in 2008, the show was eventually cancelled in mid-2009 after Sky1 found the production too costly.
