= Boleyn Tavern =

Listed pub in East Ham, London, England

- The pub in 2021

- Location within London Borough of Newham Location within Greater London
- Alternative names: The Boleyn

General information
- Architectural style: French Renaissance
- Location: 1 Barking Road, East Ham, London, England
- Coordinates: 51°31′49″N 0°02′17″E
- Year built: 1899–1900; 126 years ago
- Renovated: 2021 (restored)
- Owner: Remarkable Pubs

Design and construction
- Architects: W. G. Shoebridge and H. W. Rising
- Designations

Listed Building – Grade II
- Official name: Boleyn public house
- Designated: 25 October 1984
- Reference no.: 1293693

The former billiards room in 2021

The Boleyn Tavern is a Grade II listed public house in East Ham, London, England, at the junction of Barking Road and Green Street. Completed in 1900 to the designs of W. G. Shoebridge and H. W. Rising, it occupies a prominent corner site near the former Boleyn Ground. The building is recognised for its French Renaissance-inspired design and historic interior, which retains significant original features and was extensively restored in 2021. The pub is included in CAMRA's National Inventory of Historic Pub Interiors, where it is rated three stars and regarded as being of "outstanding national historic importance".

== History ==
The public house was built in 1899–1900 to the designs of W. G. Shoebridge and H. W. Rising. The date 1900 appears on the entrance consoles.

The pub was frequented by West Ham United F.C. supporters because of its proximity to the club's ground, the Boleyn Ground. Owing to the risk of vandalism by opposing supporters, its windows were sometimes boarded up before local derbies, including matches between West Ham United and Millwall.

On 25 October 1984, the Boleyn was designated a Grade II listed building. It was included on the Campaign for Real Ale (CAMRA)'s National Inventory of Historic Pub Interiors before the inventory's grading system was revised. Under the revised scheme, it is rated three stars and its interior is regarded as being "of outstanding national historic importance".

The pub reopened in June 2021 following a £1.5 million refurbishment. The project sought to recreate the building's original appearance, including the installation of handcrafted timber and glass screens based on surviving historic examples. As a result, the original arrangement of seven separate bar areas was reinstated. As of August 2026, the freehold is owned by Remarkable Pubs.

== A visit from Gandhi ==
Local tradition holds that Mahatma Gandhi visited the Boleyn Tavern at least once in 1931. That year, Gandhi spent three months in London for talks on the future of India. He was based at Kingsley Hall in Bromley-by-Bow and received an enthusiastic welcome from residents of the East End.

It has been claimed that Gandhi attended several West Ham United matches during his stay, and that he visited the Boleyn Tavern, where he drank cream soda while discussing football and radical politics with local people. Gandhi was a keen football supporter and established three teams in South Africa. He also had a connection with West Ham through his friendship with the club's founder, Arnold Hills. While studying law in London between 1888 and 1891, Gandhi was appointed by Hills to the executive committee of the London Vegetarian Society.

Gandhi took long early-morning walks during his 1931 stay in London and often used the nearby Greenway, then known as the Sewerbank, between Stratford and Plaistow. He also met Charlie Chaplin in nearby Canning Town.

== Architecture ==
=== Exterior ===
The building occupies a prominent corner position and is faced in red brick with decorative stone or rendered detailing. The ground floor is distinguished by polished red granite and rises to three and a half storeys, with three bays facing each street and a lower extension along Green Street. Large gabled dormer windows project from both roof slopes, while the rounded corner is marked by an octagonal turret topped with a domed roof and finial.

The windows are divided into smaller sections by stone or timber framing, and the first floor is decorated with classical detailing, including columns supporting curved pediments above the openings. On the Barking Road frontage, the second-floor windows are framed by three prominent arched surrounds.

=== Interior ===
A notable feature of the interior is the large glazed rooflight above what was formerly the billiards room, now used as a dining area with an open kitchen and serving space. Other surviving historic elements include bar counters and bar backs, an original arch spanning part of the serving area, a tiled entrance lobby, an additional rooflight above the former saloon bar, cast-iron columns, and extensive decorative etched glass.
