= Sylvie Lewis =

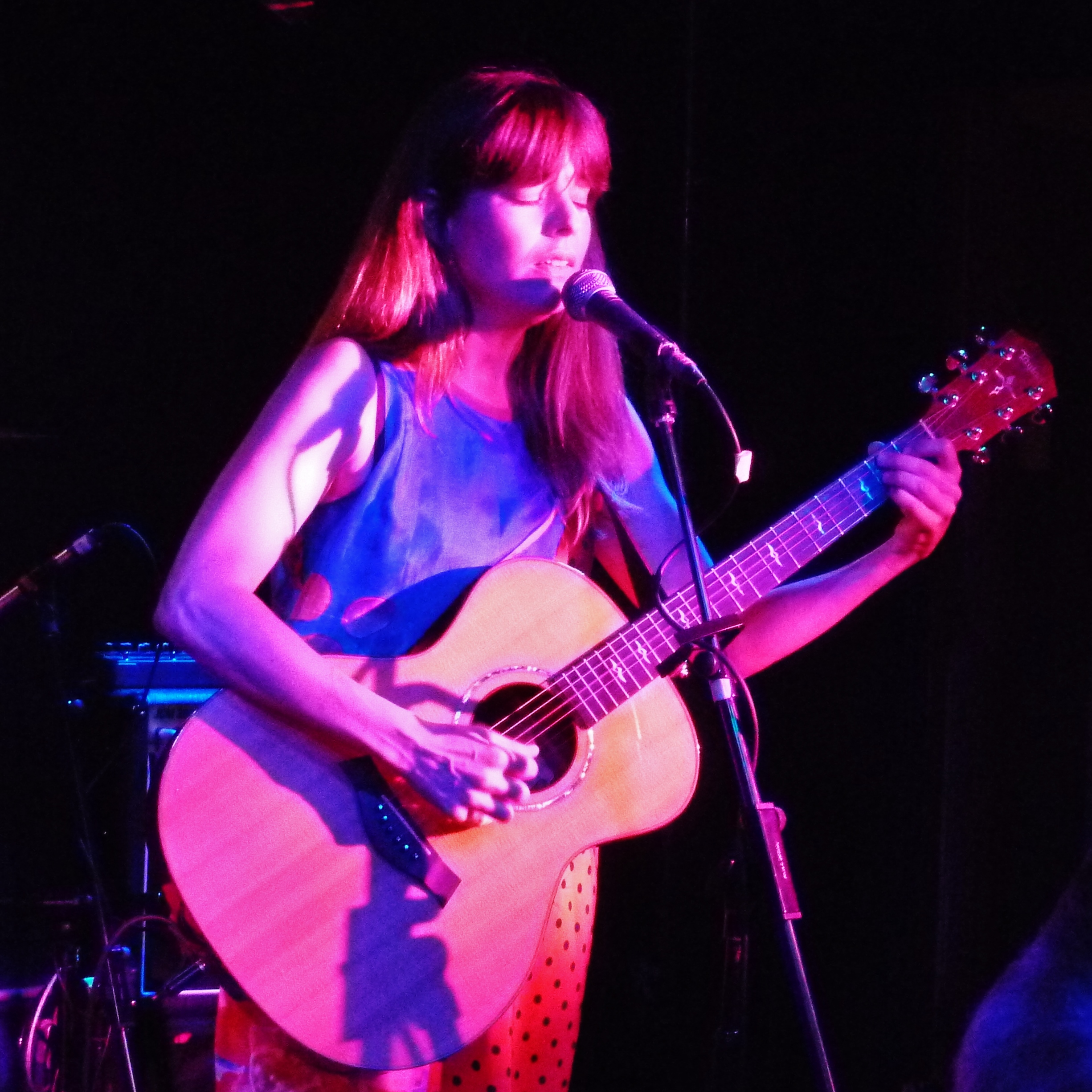
- Lewis performing in 2013

Background information
- Born: London, England
- Genres: Folk
- Label: Cheap Lullaby Records

Sylvie Lewis is a folk musician from London, England.

== Early life ==
Lewis was born in London to BBC journalist and broadcaster Martyn Lewis and ex-model and presenter Liz Carse. Her grandfather was the polar explorer and actor Duncan Carse. She moved to the United States in 1995 and studied at the Berklee College of Music in Boston, Massachusetts.

== Career ==
After graduation, Lewis relocated to Los Angeles in 1998, where she quit music to become a teacher. Two years later, upon reading an article in a Los Angeles newspaper which stated that in a survey of the worst paid jobs in the US, teacher was number 2 and musician was number 1 - she decided to return to being a singer/songwriter. Her self-released EP Beautiful Mess was heard by Cheap Lullaby Records (a label whose musicians include Joan As Policewoman and Teitur), who signed her to a deal. She released her debut album Tangos and Tantrums under the label, with producer Richard Swift, in 2004 and has toured in the United States, Canada and Europe since then. In 2005, she relocated to Barcelona and her second studio album and third overall, Translations (produced by Lewis, Swift and Elijah Thomson) was released. Lewis was interviewed on NPR's All Things Considered on September 16, 2007. In 2008, she toured extensively with Sondre Lerche and the pair wrote a song together for his album Heartbeat Radio, for which Lewis also sings backing vocals. She played at SXSW in Austin, Texas in March 2009, and moved to Rome, her current residence, where she was invited to join L'Orchestra di Piazza Vittorio to interpret Pamina in their adaptation of The Magic Flute which toured Europe in 2009 and 2010.

Lewis wrote songs for, and performed in, OPV's recent show "Il giro del mondo in 80 giorni" at Teatro Olimpico, Rome. In 2012, Lewis began working on her fourth studio album in Los Angeles. Later that year, It's All True was independently released by Lewis and produced by Swift. It was subsequently voted one of the best albums of the year by Performing Songwriter magazine. 2013 tours included dates with Eleni Mandell, Dawn Landes, Josephine Foster and Scott Matthew. She began 2014 by collaborating once again with Sondre Lerche on the soundtrack for the film The Sleepwalker, which premiered at Sundance Film Festival. She shared the stage with Ed Harcourt, Eleni Mandell, Jesse Winchester, Jimmy Webb, Anaïs Mitchell, The Weepies and Jennifer Kimball among others.

It's All True was subsequently independently released by Lewis later that year.

== Discography ==
- Beautiful Mess (EP) - self-released (2001)
- Tangos and Tantrums (CD) - Cheap Lullaby Records (2005)
- Translations (CD) - Cheap Lullaby Records (2007)
- It's All True (CD) - self-released (2012)
- Night Flowers (CD) (2015)
