= Martyn Lewis =

Welsh journalist and newscaster (born 1945)

Sir Martyn Lewis CBE
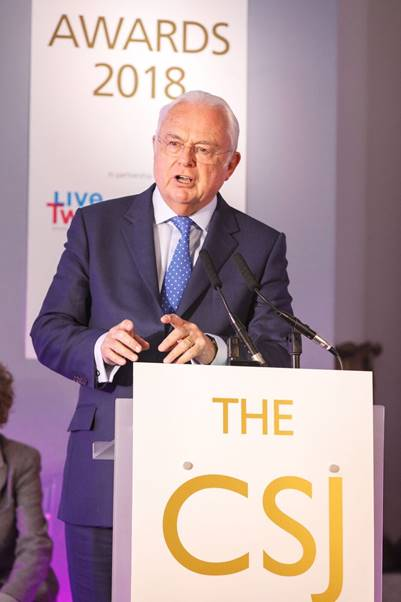
- Lewis in April 2018
- Born: Martyn John Dudley Lewis; 7 April 1945 (age 81); Swansea, Wales
- Occupation: Broadcast journalist
- Spouses: Liz Carse (m. 1970; died 2012) Patsy Baker (m. 2012)
- Children: 2, including Sylvie

Sir Martyn John Dudley Lewis CBE (born 7 April 1945) is a Welsh television news presenter and broadcast journalist who anchored ITN news bulletins between 1978 and 1986 and BBC News television shows from 1986 to 1999. Lewis attended Dalriada School and Trinity College, Dublin, before working as a freelance correspondent for BBC Northern Ireland and Harlech Television (HTV). He joined ITN in 1970 and headed its Northern Bureau from 1971 to 1978. Between 1978 and 1986, Lewis was an anchor for ITN's News at 5.45 and half-hour News at Ten bulletins, writing stories for the "And finally..." segment that features positive stories at the end of each News at Ten programme.

He joined the BBC in October 1986, presenting the newly formed One O'Clock News before reading the news on the Nine O'Clock News from 1987 to 1994. In 1993, Lewis launched a campaign to have more positive stories included in news bulletins. Between 1994 and 1999, he was a main presenter of the Six O'Clock News. Lewis is heavily engaged in the charitable and business sectors, serving as a leader and patron of several charities. He was made a Commander of the Order of the British Empire (CBE) in the 1997 New Year Honours and was knighted in the 2016 New Year Honours for his charitable work.

== Early life and education ==
Lewis was born on 7 April 1945 in Swansea, Glamorgan, Wales. He is the son of the quantity surveyor Thomas John Dudley Lewis, who came from Coleraine in County Londonderry, Northern Ireland, and his wife Doris (née Jones), who worked as a nurse. Lewis has a younger sister who was a lecturer in feminist studies. His parents met in Northern Ireland during the Second World War and were married in Belfast. Lewis and his family moved to Portrush, on the north coast of County Antrim, when he was four years old; the family later settled at a house his father had built on the Mountsandel Road in nearby Coleraine in County Londonderry.

He was educated at the co-educational Dalriada School in Ballymoney in the north of County Antrim, where he was bullied for a term because he was overweight and developed a severe stammer. Lewis overcame his stammer by performing Shakespeare plays and losing weight through circuit exercise and weight lighting. He achieved nine O-levels and four A-levels while also excelling in rugby, editing the school magazine and serving as deputy head boy.

He joined the Army Cadet Force in Dalriada and became Bisley 22. combined Cadet Force UK champion in 1963. After failing to enrol at the University of Cambridge, he graduated with a Bachelor of Arts degree in Economics, Philosophy and Geography from Trinity College, Dublin (TCD), in 1967. Lewis was secretary of the university's rugby club but ceased playing the game because of the possibility of sustaining a dental injury.

== Media career ==
After turning down two job offers in the advertising and public relations industries in England, he started working as a freelance reporter for BBC Northern Ireland in Belfast for ten months in 1967. He also chaired a sixth formers' interview programme in Northern Ireland. After writing in to more than 50 television stations, Lewis worked as a reporter for Harlech Television (HTV) in Cardiff in Glamorgan, Wales, from 1968 to 1978. He received on-the-job training as a journalist. Lewis joined ITN in London in 1970. The following April, Lewis established ITN's Northern Bureau in Manchester, leading it until 1978. He covered the news from the North of England in an area from the Midlands to the North of Scotland. From 1978 to 1986, he worked as a news reader on ITN's News at 5.45 and News at Ten bulletins as well as serving as a foreign correspondent. In the early 1980s, Lewis wrote the "And finally..." segment, which featured positive stories at the end of each half-hour ''News at Ten'' bulletin.

Lewis visited more than 30 countries on assignment for ITN. He covered the Turkish invasion of Cyprus, the Independence of the Seychelles, the deposition of the Shah of Iran Mohammad Reza Pahlavi during the Iranian Revolution, the invasion of Afghanistan by the Soviet Union, the plight of the Vietnamese boat people, and the Wedding of Prince Andrew and Sarah Ferguson. Lewis was a co-presenter of ITN's United Kingdom general election coverage in 1979 and 1983 and its budget coverage from 1981 to 1984. He wrote and produced the Battle for the Falklands video, and he wrote and presented The Secret Hunters documentary for TVS in 1986 about a secret SAS group that killed the Nazis who murdered their soldiers after hunting them for three years after World War II. Lewis edited the 1986 two-hour programmes In Private, In Public, which focused on the Prince and Princess of Wales' year.

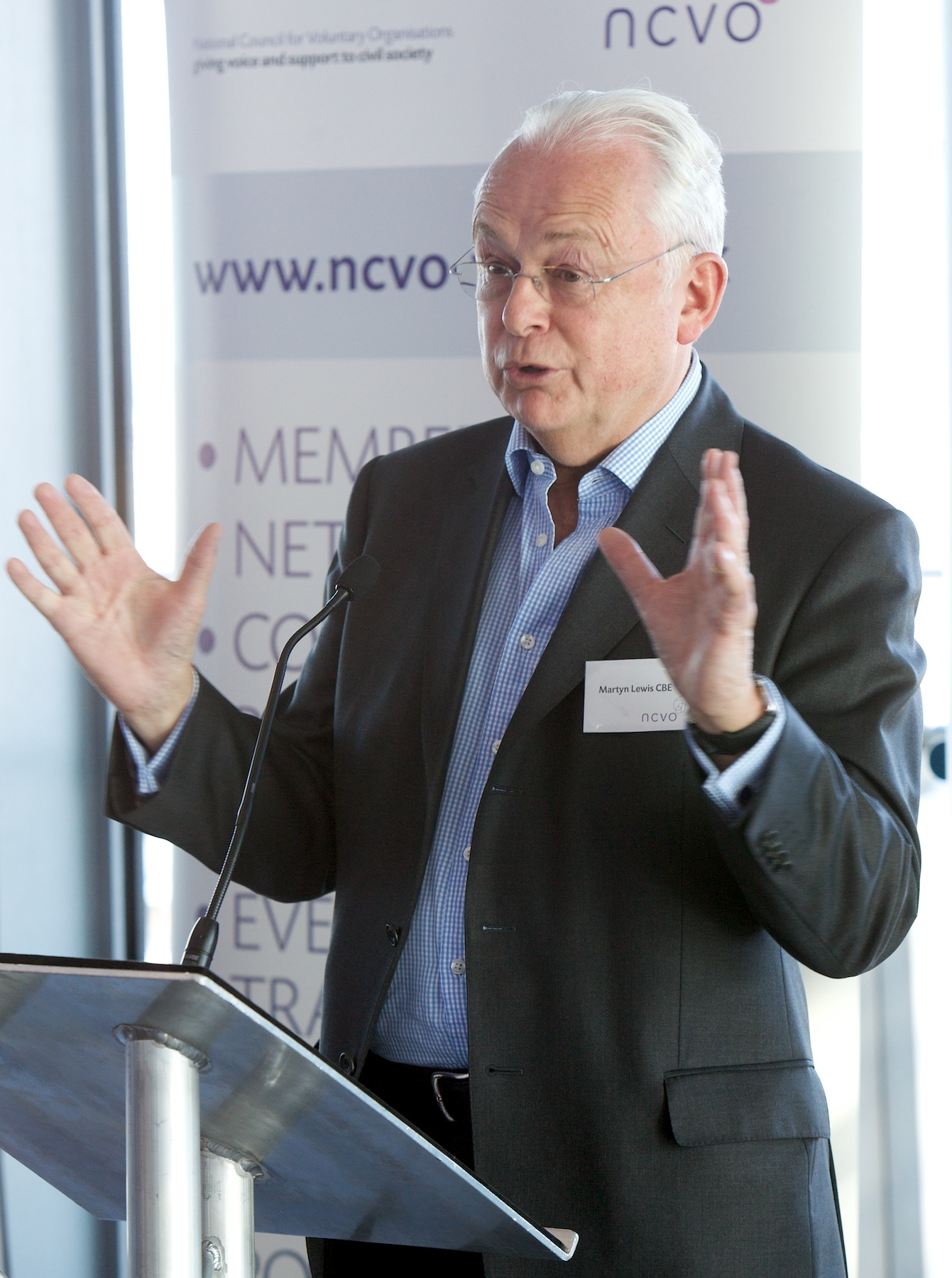
Lewis in June 2013

In October 1986, Lewis was hired by Michael Grade to join the BBC as a presenter of BBC News bulletins. He was the first person to read the news on the One O'Clock News weekday bulletin on BBC1 on 27 October when the programme was launched as part of the channel's daytime service. Lewis was moved by the BBC to be the lead newsreader of the Nine O'Clock News weekday nightly bulletin from October 1987, and began sharing presenting duties of the programme with fellow newsreader Michael Buerk when it switched to a one-presenter format in October 1988. He created a modicum of controversy in 1993 when he claimed that television should feature more "good news". Lewis subsequently stated that he had been "misunderstood" on the matter.

From late January 1994 he switched roles with Peter Sissons thus becoming a lead presenter of the Six O'Clock News for three days a week. Lewis rejected an offer to present BBC Breakfast News but reportedly threatened his resignation from the corporation because he wanted to remain on prime time television.

Lewis also made multiple documentaries on various topics for the BBC, and was an occasional host of Songs of Praise. From November 1993 to March 1999, he presented the BBC2 daily news-based quiz show Today's the Day (as well as its Radio 2 version between 1996 and 1997), which emphasises a specific date in previous years and events that occurred on that date. From 1996 to 1998, Lewis presented the prime-time BBC1 real-life crime programme ''Crimebeat''. He broke the news of the outbreak of the Gulf War to the British public in 1991.

Lewis played a prominent role in the announcement of the death of Diana, Princess of Wales on 31 August 1997. He was called into the BBC in the early hours of that morning to present short national bulletins during a late night viewing of Borsalino about the car accident in Paris. He returned home afterwards to get some sleep, expecting the Princess to recover, only to be called back again in time for the special 6 am bulletin covering Diana's death. Lewis was almost brought to tears following Prime Minister Tony Blair's "People's Princess" statement. On 26 April 1999, he presented the Six O'Clock News bulletin with Jennie Bond on the day his co-presenter Jill Dando was murdered outside her home in West London.

Lewis resigned from the BBC in May of that year after it attempted to move him from the job he had lost at the Six O'Clock News to another position within the corporation; he turned down an offer to work at BBC World News, saying that he did not want to leave "the best job in broadcasting." He was the anchor and mayor of Bethlehem in the 1999 ITV series Bethlehem Year Zero, which told the Christmas story in the manner of a television news bulletin. In 2000, Lewis presented Dateline Jerusalem, and ''News 40: The Battle of Britain'', a week of nightly broadcasts reporting on events from six decades ago in a contemporary perspective. From 2000 to 2002, he presented the ITV debate programme ''Ultimate Questions'', which discussed current moral issues.

Lewis returned to television news in September 2005 to broadcast a special edition of the ITV Evening News with Mary Nightingale as part of the ITN's 50th anniversary celebrations. He had a cameo role as a newscaster in the 1999 James Bond film The World Is Not Enough, and was featured in archive footage in the 2006 film The Queen.

== Other business ==
Lewis was chairman and co-founder of Teliris, one of the first telepresence systems developed. He was actively involved in the marketing of this solution through personal contacts, speaking engagements and "Telepresence Times", his vlog launched in 2009. He retired as chairman in 2012.

He is the founder and Executive Chairman of YourBigDay Ltd, which utilises ITN and Reuters archives to create birthday and anniversary videos spanning the last century. Lewis was made a director of the Independent Press Standards Organisation in 2014 and chaired an inquiry into the voluntary sector with regards to executive pay within it. In July 2020, he joined the board of renewable energy start-up Alpha 311.

== Charity work ==
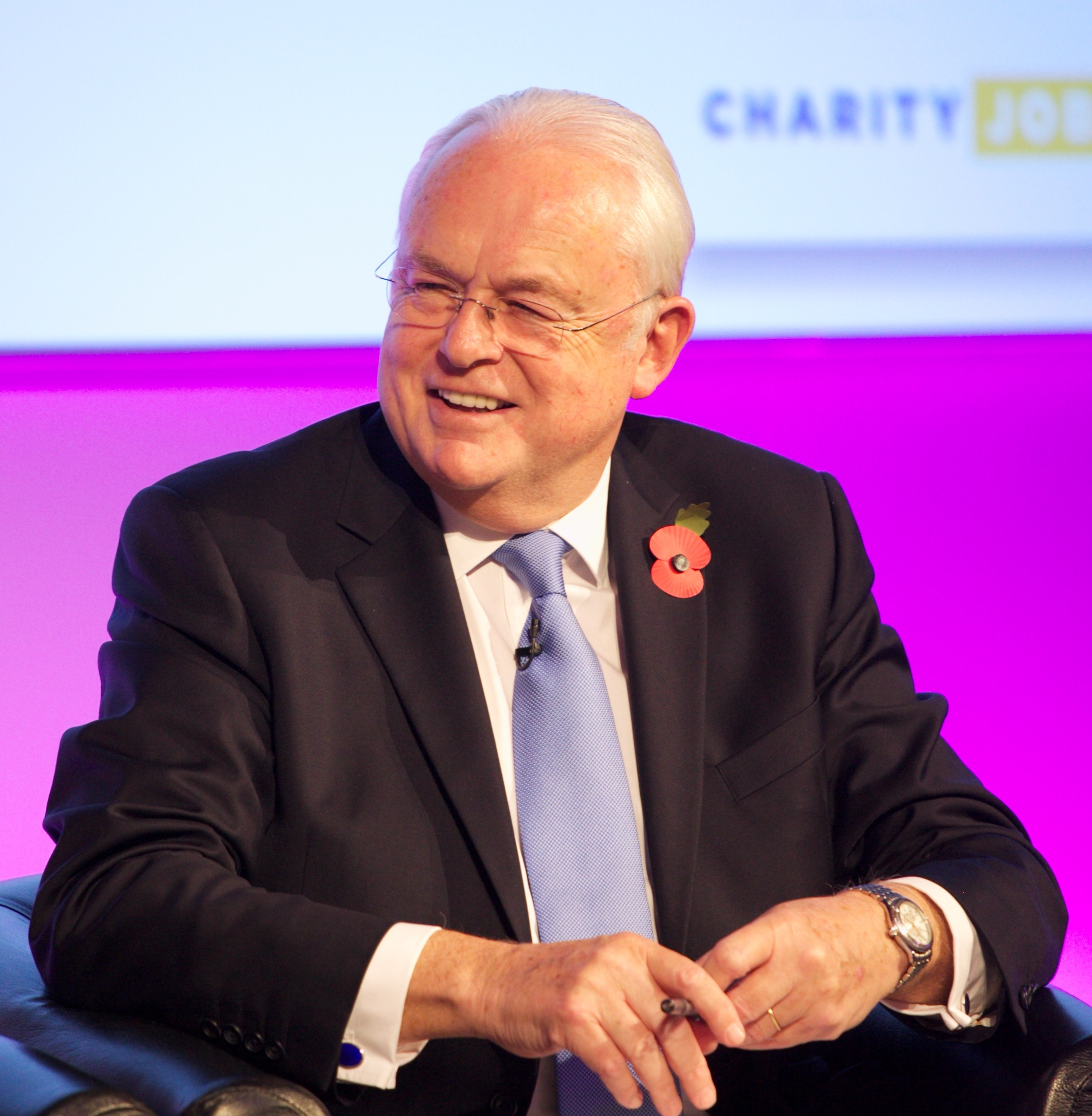
Lewis in 2014

Lewis is a vice-president of such charities as Hospice UK, Marie Curie Cancer Care, Macmillan Cancer Support, East Anglia Children's Hospices (EACH) and Demelza Children's Hospice. He is the president of United Response, a charity that offers support to people with learning disabilities or mental health needs as well as opportunities for those with learning disabilities to find work.

He founded the youth charity YouthNet in 1995 (now known as The Mix), and stayed as chairman until stepping down in July 2014, though he remains an advisor. The charity provides advice, information and support through websites aimed at young people.

From 2010 to 2016 he was chair of the National Council for Voluntary Organisations, an umbrella body for charities in England and Wales with more than 13,000 members. He is also chairman of the Queen's Award for Voluntary Service. He was chairman of Families of the Fallen 2010–15; trustee of the Windsor Leadership Trust 2001–10, and is currently deputy chair of the Lord Mayor of London's Dragon Awards.

He is a patron of Mildmay Mission Hospital, The Patchwork Foundation, the quarterly broadsheet Positive News, and Dementia UK. In September 2015, it was announced that Lewis had become the first ambassador of Pennies, a fintech charity that enables charitable micro-donations. He has been a member of the Tidy Britain Committee, and worked with The Prince's Trust youth organisation.

== Personal life ==
Lewis is a Christian. He was married to HTV continuity announcer Elizabeth Anne Carse from 20 May 1970 until her death from an advanced type of dementia in 2012. They have two daughters, one of whom is the singer-songwriter Sylvie Lewis. He has since remarried to public relations worker Patsy Baker and is stepfather to her three children.

== Honours ==
Lewis was appointed Commander of the Order of the British Empire (CBE) in the 1997 New Year Honours "for services to young people and the hospice movement." He was knighted in the 2016 New Year Honours "for voluntary and charitable work, especially for the hospice movement."

Lewis also holds an honorary Doctorate of Letters from Ulster University. He is a Freeman of the City of London and a fellow of the Royal Society of Arts. Lewis is a member of the Garrick Club and the British Academy of Film and Television Arts.

== Bibliography ==
Books by Lewis include:

- And Finally (1984) – an anthology of humorous stories that have ended News at Ten bulletins over the years. ISBN 978-0-7126-0923-4
- Tears and Smiles – the Hospice Handbook (with the Duchess of Kent, 1989) – the first layman's guide to the British Hospice movement. ISBN 978-1-85479-060-6
- Cats in The News (1991) – a humorous anthology which topped the best seller list for 8 weeks. ISBN 978-0-356-20282-2
- Dogs in the News (1992) – an anthology of stories involving dogs written in demand following the publication of Lewis' equivalent book about cats. ISBN 978-0-7515-0250-3
- Go For It – Martyn Lewis's Essential Guide to Opportunities for Young People (1993–98) – annual publication which was the forerunner of the charity YouthNet. ISBN 978-1-85291-131-7.
- Today's The Day (1995) – based on Lewis' quiz show of the same name. ISBN 978-0-86369-943-6.
- Reflections on Success (1997) – interviews with more than 60 notable individuals across a wide range of professions analysing their success. ISBN 978-1-85291-139-3
- Seasons of Our Lives (1999) – an anthology of poetry and prose to comfort, encourage and amuse people as they go through different stages of life. ISBN 978-1-85291-142-3
