= Cass (2008 film) =

- Theatrical Poster
- Directed by: Jon S. Baird
- Screenplay by: Jon S. Baird
- Based on: book by Cass Pennant and Mike Ridley
- Produced by: Stefan Haller
- Starring: Nonso Anozie; Natalie Press; Reece Allen
- Cinematography: Christopher Ross
- Music by: Matteo Scumaci
- Production company: Goldcrest Independent
- Distributed by: Optimum Releasing
- Release date: 1 August 2008 (UK)
- Running time: 100 minutes
- Country: United Kingdom
- Language: English

Cass is a 2008 British crime drama film. It stars Nonso Anozie as Cass Pennant and is directed by Jon S. Baird.

== Plot ==
Cass is based on the true story of the life of Cass Pennant, adapted from his book. The film tells of how he was adopted by an elderly white couple in 1958 and brought up in Slade Green, an all-white area of London. Cass is forced to endure racist bullying on a daily basis from local children, who also ridicule his feminine-sounding name, "Carol", a name given to him at birth. Cass finds through violence the respect he never had and becomes addicted to the buzz of fighting. Cass leads the Inter City Firm to victories against large hooligan firms, such as Leeds in 1980, but becomes frustrated with the lack of publicity the ICF are receiving. So he creates cards with the infamous slogan, "Congratulations, you have just met the famous ICF", and gives a TV interview, increasing the firm's notoriety for humiliation, their speciality. However, the government under Margaret Thatcher begins to come down hard on hooliganism, and after an organised attack on a group of Newcastle United supporters, Cass is imprisoned for four years. Whilst in Wormwood Scrubs, Cass begins writing his autobiography, in the hope he can generate some income upon the book being published; however his writings are confiscated by the prison upon his release.

Cass is delighted to receive a hero's welcome upon his return, and begins dating Elaine (Natalie Press). This, as well as Cass's rejection of his biological parents after their attempts to contact him, improves his relationship with his adoptive parents after they began to disapprove of his violent lifestyle. Despite having a good relationship with Elaine, Cass is still lured to the violence of hooliganism, and when one of his best friends, Prentice (Gavin Brocker), is attacked by Arsenal supporters with knives, Cass seeks revenge. He is stabbed in the following fight, and Elaine is disgusted, fearing he is returning to his old ways, as she reveals she is pregnant with his child.

As time progresses to the early 1990s, the ecstasy era takes over, and hooliganism becomes less of an attraction for Cass, and for many other hooligan firms. By 1992, he has settled down in Penge, South London, with his young son and Elaine, who is pregnant again. Cass gets a job as a bouncer outside nightclubs, working for Ray (Tamer Hassan), a long-time friend from his ICF days. However one evening, just after starting a shift at the nightclub, Cass is shot three times by the group of Arsenal supporters that he feuded with back in the 1980s. Cass survives, but wakes up to hear the tragic news that his mother has died.

In the following weeks, Cass is haunted by his demons after the shooting; he sees visions of his attacker, he can't sleep and on one occasion, makes a violent outburst at his son. Cass's friend Ray has tracked down his attackers and offers Cass the opportunity to kill them. Cass is taken to a pub and holds a gun to his attacker's head at point-blank range, but decides not to pull the trigger. The film ends as Cass walks away from the pub and into the distance.

Pennant himself plays a cameo role in the movie as the character "Biggs", who is one of the bouncers.

== Cast ==
- Nonso Anozie as Cass Pennant
- Natalie Press as Elaine
- Leo Gregory as Freeman
- Gavin Brocker as Prentice
- Linda Bassett as Doll
- Tamer Hassan as Ray
- Peter Wight as Cecil
- Paul Kaye as Arsenal thug
- Bronson Webb as The Assassin
- Lorraine Stanley as Linda
- Robbie Gee as Marlon

Teenage section;

- Daniel Kaluuya as Cass, aged 14
- Jayson Wheatley as Young Prentice, aged 14
- Rory Jennings as Young Freeman, aged 14

Young section;

- Verelle Roberts as Young Cass
- Callum Ruane as Young Prentice
- Jack Johnson as Young Freeman
- Carl Fairweather as Young Cass
