= 01-for London =

UK television programme

- Genre: Art listings
- Country of origin: United Kingdom
- Original language: English

Production
- Producers: Tom Gutteridge and Mentorn Films
- Production company: Thames Television

Original release
- Network: ITV (South-East region)
- Release: 1987 – 1992

01-for London is a Thames Television programme broadcast on ITV in South-East England between 1987 and 1992. It was a weekly arts listings programme developed in conjunction with Time Out magazine. The programme was produced by Tom Gutteridge and Mentorn Films. Its presenters includes Richard Jobson, Neil Mullarkey, Mark Webster and Kathy Lette.

== Creation ==
01-for London was first broadcast in South-East England in 1987. It was a weekly arts listings show produced by Tom Gutteridge and Mentorn Films for Thames Television, the regional ITV franchise holder. It was developed in conjunction with Time Out, the weekly "whats-on" magazine for London. The programme co-sponsored a series of annual London arts awards with the magazine.

The first presenters were Richard Jobson, formerly the singer in the punk rock band Skids, actor and comedian Neil Mullarkey and Nikki Groocock. The programme covered music, fashion, art and entertainment and has been described by the London Evening Standard as "yoof TV". Viv Albertine worked behind the cameras helping to film on location across London.

01-for London derives its name from the former area dialling code for London. On 6 May 1990 this was changed to 071 (for inner London) and 081 (for outer London). The programme was Mentorn's first major success. Guttridge sold regional variants to Central Independent Television and Anglia Television.

== Later history ==
By 1989 Groocock and Mullarkey had been replaced by Fiona Adam and Mark Webster. Australian-born author Kathy Lette was also a presenter for a while. 01-for London survived cuts late in 1991 that saw the ITV franchises move documentaries and current affairs programmes from peak time to make room in the schedules for game shows and feature films, which were considered to have wider appeal to viewers. The cuts saw the loss of 200 jobs and the end of the City Programme, Thames Reports and Thames Action on the south-east network. 01-for London was cancelled in 1992, being replaced by Carlton Television's Big City. The Guardian said at the time it was "like having to swap a bright yellow curvy Japanese sports car for a dumpy little khaki-coloured old Ford Fiesta".
