= Today's the Day (game show) =

BBC Two quiz programme

- Genre: Game show
- Presented by: Andrew Rawnsley; Martyn Lewis
- Country of origin: United Kingdom
- Original language: English
- No. of series: 17
- No. of episodes: 745

Production
- Running time: 30 minutes
- Production company: Mentorn

Original release
- Network: BBC2
- Release: 12 July 1993 – 12 March 1999

Today's the Day is a British television daytime quiz programme that was broadcast on BBC2 from 12 July 1993 until 12 March 1999. The programme was originally hosted by Andrew Rawnsley until he was replaced by Martyn Lewis.

== Format ==
Teams of two contestants each competed to answer questions about events that had taken place in past years on the episode's broadcast date.

Several rounds were played during each episode, with the order varying slightly from one series to the next:

- Stop the Clip: A 30-second news film clip was played, and the first contestant to buzz in with a correct answer to the host's question about it won points for his/her team. The point value decreased as the clip continued.
- TV Round: Teams alternated choosing clips from classic television shows on a video wall and answering questions about them. A miss gave the opposing team a chance to score with a correct answer.
- Quick-Fire Round: A speed round of questions, in which anyone from either team could buzz in.
- Video Wall: Same rules as the TV Round, but using news film clips.
- One-Minute Quick-Fire Round: Always played as the final round to determine the day's winner. One contestant from each team took part; playing separately, each was given 60 seconds to answer as many questions as possible. The contestant on the trailing team went first.

Teams could remain on the show for a maximum of five days before retiring undefeated. At the end of each series, the teams with the highest final scores were invited back to compete in a knockout tournament, with a pair of round-the-world air tickets awarded to the winning team. All contestants who appeared on the programme received a newspaper printed on the day they were born.

== Transmissions ==
=== Regular ===
Series	Start date	End date	Episodes
1	12 July 1993	21 July 1993	6
2	1 November 1993	17 December 1993	29
3	10 January 1994	15 April 1994	52
4	24 October 1994	23 December 1994	45
5	9 January 1995	14 April 1995	70
6	1 May 1995	2 June 1995	21
7	23 October 1995	22 December 1995	44
8	8 January 1996	29 March 1996	50
9	1 April 1996	19 June 1996	35
10	7 October 1996	20 December 1996	43
11	13 January 1997	27 March 1997	44
12	31 March 1997	18 June 1997	37
13	27 October 1997	19 December 1997	35
14	12 January 1998	17 April 1998	56
15	5 May 1998	17 June 1998	23
16	7 September 1998	18 December 1998	49
17	15 February 1999	12 March 1999	20

=== Champions League ===
Series	Start date	End date	Episodes
1	21 August 1995	20 October 1995	28
2	2 September 1996	4 October 1996	23
3	1 September 1997	10 October 1997	29

=== Specials ===
Date	Entitle
3 April 1994	Celebrity Special
25 December 1994	Christmas Special
15 April 1995	Easter Special
25 December 1995	Christmas Special
25 December 1996	Christmas Special
25 December 1997	Christmas Special

== International versions ==
The Italian channel Rai 3 was the first international broadcaster to launch a local format of the show, called Giorno dopo giorno.

Country	Name	Presenter	Channel	Broadcast
Italy	Giorno dopo giorno	Pippo Baudo (2000); Giancarlo Magalli (2000–2001); Corrado Tedeschi (2001–2002)	Rai 3	1 January 2000 – 24 May 2002
