= Mark Webster (presenter) =

British journalist

Mark Webster is a British journalist and broadcaster who has presented Channel 5's late night sports shows.

== TV presenting ==
Webster hosted a show called "Off the Wall" show for music channel, Music Box, folllowed by a co-host stint for three series of Thames Television arts and entertainment guide 01-for London in 1988, recording specials from Los Angeles, Moscow, Berlin and the Edinburgh Festival. Other presenting jobs include an entertainment strand for BBC News 24, reviewing music videos on The Little Picture Show and hosting First Take, a series for first-time film makers on Anglia. he has also contributed to C4's Top Ten... and British Soul series and ITV's Tribes and voiced the top 40 Only Fools and Horses moments for the entertainment channel Dave. His writing credits include Never Mind the Buzzcocks, and A League of Their Own.

== Sport presenting ==
Webster's first role on a sports show came on the cable station Sportswire hosting live events and chat shows. 1995'1998 he worked in the United States for British station Channel 4 presenting live game coverage of NBA matches anda basketball lifestyle magazine show 24/7.

He also co-narrated the multi-sport programme Gillette World Sports Special, alongside David Jensen.

For 10 years Webster worked on a variety of programmes for Channel 5 including hosting their NBA, NFL, NHL and IndyCar coverage, plus their multi-sport programme Live And Dangerous, usually alongside Kevin Day. In August 2010 Webster started presenting his own football podcast 'The Whistleblowers', produced by Playback Media.

== Radio ==
Webster hosted KISS FM's breakfast show for two years and the Xfm breakfast show for one, he has also worked for Jazz FM and Talksport, gave TV insights on Simon Mayo's BBC Radio 5 Live early afternoon show, and is a regular contributor to Radio 5 Live'sDotun Adebayo and his Night Club programme from 1am - 5am. The Virtual Jukebox feature invited to choose a record on a given subject. Webster offered music insights, a role shared with Jonathan Wyngate. He is a regular guest on Talksport 2.

== Print ==
Webster began his media career in the 1980s as assistant editor on the world's most popular black music magazine Blues & Soul. More recently, he has continued to freelance for publications such as The Face, Loaded and GQ, writing 'style' articles covering fashion, film, design and music. He now writes a TV review, Edge of The Box, for Sport Mail Online and is a staff writer for men's quarterly style magazine Jocks & Nerds.
