= Cass Pennant =

English writer and former football hooligan

- Born: 3 March 1958 (age 68); Doncaster, Yorkshire, England
- Occupations: Writer; film producer; public speaker
- Writing career
- Period: 2002–present
- Subjects: Football; Football hooliganism
- Notable work: Cass

Carol "Cass" Pennant (born 3 March 1958) is an English writer, film producer and former football hooligan.

== Background ==
Pennant's mother emigrated from Jamaica while pregnant and he was born in Doncaster, Yorkshire. When he was six weeks old, Pennant was abandoned and placed into a Dr. Barnardo's Home. He was soon fostered by an elderly white family in Slade Green, south-east London, where he was the only black person. Pennant says he was "bullied from day one" year after year, and beaten persistently – "Not just from rivals or other kids, the whole town. Imagine as a kid, you're picked out; people in vehicles shouting out at you, total strangers".

Pennant had been christened Carol, a common masculine name in parts of the West Indies but unusual as a masculine name in the UK; this was also a source of bullying for him, particularly at school. After seeing legendary boxer Muhammad Ali (then known by his birth name of Cassius Clay) beat Henry Cooper, he adopted the name Cass.

Pennant was a member and leader of the Inter City Firm (ICF), a hooligan gang associated with the English football club West Ham United in the late 1970s and 1980s. He became one of the generals of the ICF, despite being black. He was sentenced to four years in prison in 1980, and was the first person to receive that long a sentence for football hooliganism.

Pennant was arrested by the Metropolitan Police in 1987 as part of Operation Fulltime. The aim of this police operation was to bring West Ham's football hooligans to justice.

After a second time in prison he started running a night club security firm in London. While working at one such nightclub in South London he was shot three times.

In 2002, Pennant appeared on the Channel 4 documentary, Football's Fight Club about football hooliganism in the 1970s. He has been a consultant on television programmes such as The Real Football Factories and The Real Football Factories International. He also worked as a consultant and played a cameo role as a riot police officer in the 2005 drama film about football hooliganism, Green Street.

In 2006, he had a documentary made about him, Cass Pennant – Enough Said (Gangster Videos) directed by Liam Galvin, and in 2008 a film was made based on Pennant's life story, Cass, starring Nonso Anozie as Pennant, and directed by Jon S. Baird. In 2010, he played a leading role in the movie Killer Bitch. He also wrote the foreword for Manchester United football hooligan Colin Blaney's book Undesirables and contributed a short piece about Manchester United's rivalry with West Ham.

In 2015, Pennant produced the short film Beverley, directed by Alexander Thomas and starring Laya Lewis and Vicky McClure. The film later won Best Short Film at the 2016 British Urban Film Festival.

In 2020, Pennant co-founded the football-inspired clothing label Old School FC with Hamburg-based designer Jens Wagner.

In 2026, Pennant contributed to the BBC Radio 4 series Sixty Years of Hurt, appearing in the episode "England v Hooligans", which examined football hooliganism and changing fan culture in England. Earlier that year, he was a guest on The Overlap's football history podcast It Was What It Was, where he discussed the making of the 1985 documentary Hooligan, the Inter City Firm and the history of football hooliganism.

== Bibliography ==
- Author
  - Cass (2002)
  - Congratulations, You Have Just Met the ICF (2003)
  - Top Boys: True Stories of Football's Hardest Men (2006)
- You're Going Home in a F*cking Ambulance: Hooligan Wars – The Inside Story (2022)
- Co-author
  - Rolling with the 6.57 Crew: The True Story of Pompey's Legendary Football Fans (2004)
  - Terrace Legends (2005)
  - Good Afternoon, Gentlemen, the Name's Bill Gardner (2006)
  - 30 Years of Hurt: A History of England's Hooligan Army (2006)
  - Want Some Aggro? (2007)
  - The Story of Barrington 'Zulu' Patterson, One of Britain's Deadliest Men (2013)
