= Teliris =

Teliris Inc.
- Type: Private
- Industry: Telepresence and videoconferencing products and services
- Founded: 1999; 27 years ago in New York, NY
- Fate: Acquired by Dimension Data
- Headquarters: New York, NY
- Website: Teliris.com

Teliris was a privately owned telepresence and videoconferencing company, headquartered in New York City and London that designed and sold video collaboration products and services. It was acquired by Dimension Data in 2014.

== Company Overview ==
Teliris was founded in 1999 following a joint venture between Mycroft, a New York-based technology company, and the UK company Global Intercasting Ltd, which provided live artificial satellite television programs for global corporate clients.
