= Mentorn =

British independent company owned by Tinopolis

Mentorn Media
- Formerly: Mentorn Films (1985–1997); Mentorn Barraclough Carey (1997–2002)
- Founded: 1985; 41 years ago
- Founders: Tom Gutteridge
- Headquarters: London, England
- Parent: Tinopolis
- Divisions: Mentorn Scotland
- Website: mentorn.tv

Mentorn Media is a British independent television production company established in 1985 and owned by Welsh international production group Tinopolis since 2006. It is known for producing a wide range of programming for broadcasters in the UK and internationally and is responsible for producing content across various genres, including factual, documentary series, current affairs, and entertainment, with well-known shows such as Question Time, Traffic Cops, and An Idiot Abroad.

== History ==
In January 1997, Mentorn Films merged with fellow independent specialist factual production outfit Barraclough Carey Productions; a company that was founded by former documentary filmmaker and former BBC editor George Carey and film and television producer and former head of BBC documentaries Jenny Barraclough, thereby forming one of the largest entertainment production companies, Mentorn Barraclough Carey. Mentorn Films founder Tom Gutteridge became chief executive and majority owner of the merged production company, co-founder George Carey became creative director, and Jenny Barraclough became a director.

In September 1999, it was announced that The Television Corporation (TVC) had struck a deal to acquire Mentorn Group, including its production division Mentorn Barraclough Carey, its international distribution arm Mentorn International, and fellow production company TV21, the company behind Robot Wars.

On 28 January 2000, Mentorn Group closed its Manchester-based production division, MBC North. Six months later, Mentorn's parent holding company Television Corporation acquired independent sports production company Vemmer TV, known for producing UK coverage of the annual Tour de France cycling race.

In December 2001, a year following the acquisition of Mentorn Group by Television Corporation (TVC), Mentorn Media, which had produced its programming from Scotland, boosted its Scottish production operations by opening a new production office in Glasgow and launched a Scottish production division entitled Mentorn Scotland. This division would produce programs from its Scottish production office, while Mentorn's production subsidiary Folio became a unit within Mentorn Scotland, with managing director and Folio founder Charles Thompson and head of programming Jane Rogerson continuing in their roles.

In January 2002, Mentorn Media's parent company Television Corporation (TVC) merged Mentorn's international distribution arm, Mentorn International, with Sunset+Vine's distribution. This thereby created a new international distribution unit entitled Television Corporation Distribution, with Mentorn International managing director Mark Roland heading this new division.

=== Acquisition by Tinopolis ===
In October 2005, three months after former BBC Director of Sport Peter Salmon joined Mentorn's parent company Television Corporation as Chief Executive, Welsh independent TV production group Tinopolis announced a potential takeover approach to acquire Mentorn Media in a deal that would expand Tinopolis's sports production activities and boost its operations in London. This included Mentorn Media's Scottish production office Mentorn Scotland, its international distribution arm Mentorn International, their parent production group Television Corporation (including its production offices in both Oxford and Glasgow) and its fellow production subsidiaries Folio Productions, Sunset+Vine, and Redback Films.

In December 2006, Mentorn Media, alongside its Welsh production parent Tinopolis, announced that it had restructured and exited from scripted production operations by placing Mentorn's drama production output into a new independent drama production company under Mentorn Group entitled 'Daybreak Pictures'. Former Channel 4 and Mentorn Head of Drama David Aukin became Daybreak Pictures' creative director, whilst former Mentorn executive producer Hal Vogel and Mentorn's CEO John Willis were appointed as directors of Mentorn Group's new drama production subsidiary Daybreak Pictures. Arwel Rees, managing director of Mentorn's parent Tinopolis, also became chairman of Daybreak Pictures.

By December 2012, seven years following Tinopolis' acquisition of Mentorn Medias, Mentorn Scotland, Mentorn International, and its programming library, the former international division of Mentorn Medias and Tinopolis' distribution subsidiary had been merged into Tinopolis' London-based global media distribution company Passion Distribution. After Mentorn Media's parent Tinopolis acquired the latter distribution company as Passion Distribution became the latter's new distribution unit and Mentorn's new distributor with Passion started distributing Mentorn's future programmes worldwide.

== Filmography ==
=== Television series ===
Title	Years	Network	Notes
Question Time	1979–present	BBC One	Took over production from Brian Lapping Productions
Scratchy & Co.	1995–1998	ITV	
Techno Games	2002-2003	BBC Two	Took over production from TV21
Traffic Cops	2003–present	BBC One/BBC Three/5	
Paradise Hotel	2003–2019	Fox/MyNetworkTV & Fox Reality Channel (United States)	First American production co-production with 395 Productions
The Big Questions	2007–2021	BBC One	
Debate Night	2019–present	BBC Scotland	via Mentorn Scotland
Roarsome Dinosaurs	2022	Channel 5	
Dinosaur with Stephen Fry	2023	Channel 5	co-production with Krempelwood Entertainment
