= Bill Gardner (football hooligan) =

English football supporter and co-author

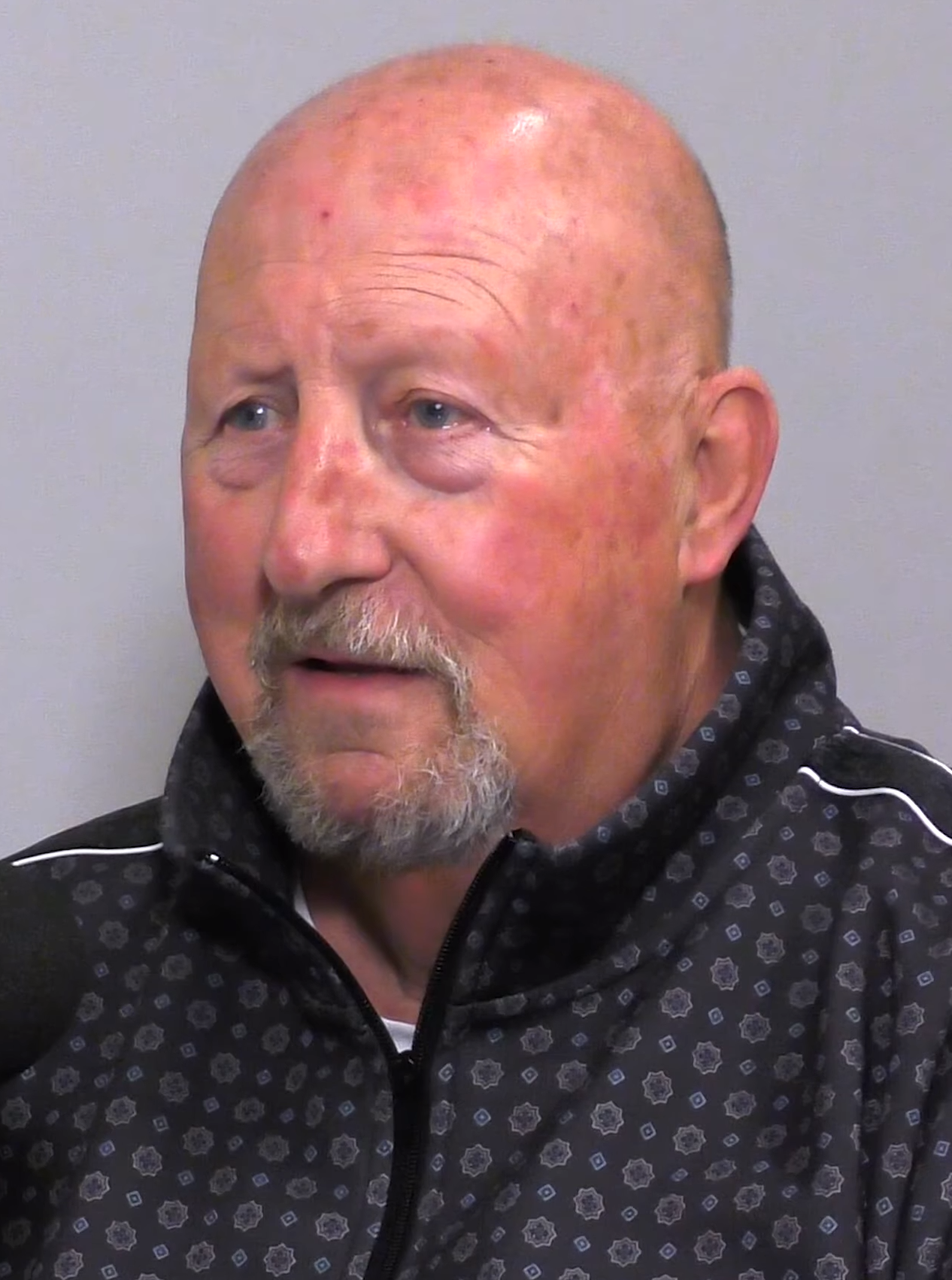
- Born: 1954 (age 71–72); Hornchurch, Essex, England
- Writing career
- Genre: Autobiography
- Subject: Footbal hooliganism
- Organization: Inter City Firm
- Style: Casual

Bill Gardner (born January 1954) is an English football supporter and former football hooligan, who has co-authored two autobiographies.

Born in Hornchurch, Essex, Gardner came to prominence in the 1970s as a supporter of West Ham United and as a member of the Mile End Mob.

Gardner was arrested by the Metropolitan Police in 1987 as part of Operation Fulltime. The aim of this police operation was to bring West Ham's football hooligans to justice.

Following a renewed interest in football hooliganism of the 1970s and 1980s, Gardner featured prominently on the cover of Inter City Firm (ICF) member Cass Pennant's 2003 book Congratulations, You Have Just Met the I. C. F. However, Gardner has always denied being a member of the ICF.

In 2005 Gardner published his autobiography Good Afternoon, Gentlemen, the Name's Bill Gardner detailing his involvement in hooliganism. The book was co-written with Cass Pennant.

Gardner was portrayed by Stuart Moore in the 2007 film Rise of the Footsoldier, which details the life of ICF member Carlton Leach. The film portrays an incident involving Gardner and the ICF fighting supporters of Manchester United, the Red Army, on the terraces at Old Trafford where he starts a fight by throwing a hot Bovril drink over an opposing fan. This mirrors a real life incident where Gardner himself had hot tea thrown over him by a Manchester United fan.

In 2020, Gardner published another autobiography Bill Gardner: The Man, The Myth, The Legend, written with Abe Atchia. The book details the abuses and crime in his life.
