= Inter City Firm =

West Ham United FC fanbase from late 1970s to early 1990s

- ICF insignia, 1980s
- Founding location: East London Essex
- Years active: 1977/78–present
- Territory: East London
- Ethnicity: Predominantly White: English and Black British
- Criminal activities: Football hooliganism, riots, fighting, organised crime, drug trafficking, extorting

The Inter City Firm (ICF) is an English football hooligan firm associated with West Ham United, which was mainly active in the 1970s, 1980s and early 1990s. The name came from the use of InterCity trains to travel to away games. They were the subject of a 1985 Thames Television documentary, Hooligan.

== History ==
The firm formed out of a number of other West Ham groups, including the Mile End Boys and Essex East London Firm. ICF formed in the 1977/78 season.

The most notable figure associated with the ICF is Cass Pennant, who wrote on football hooliganism in the 1990s and 2000s. In his book, Congratulations You Have Just Met the ICF, as a black Londoner, Pennant maintains that the ICF was not racist or right-wing. Bill Gardner, a member of the Mile End Boys, appears on the front-cover of the original print of the book.

Carlton Leach, the main character in the film Rise of the Footsoldier, is also associated with the firm. He, along with Pat Tate, Tony Tucker and Craig Rolfe, later started to get involved in the criminal underworld in London and Essex. They strayed away from the dangers of football fights, to focus on selling drugs and extorting drug dealers. Tate, Tucker and Rolfe met a brutal end in the Rettendon murders in Essex.

ICF calling card, 1980s

The ICF pioneered calling cards that were left on victims. They read "Congratulations, you have just met the ICF". Calling cards would also become popular at other football clubs.

In the very late 1980s, the ICF was regularly linked to the UK pirate radio station Centreforce through its founder Andy Swallow. Swallow was a one-time member of the Essex East London Firm also.

The ICF again came to prominence in 2018 when former members re-grouped as the Real West Ham Fans Action Group, organising protests against the club board.

== In popular culture ==
The ICF were the basis of Alan Clarke's 1988 film, The Firm. Gary Oldman plays Bex Bissell, the leader of the ICC - Inter City Crew. Members of the ICF were used as consultants on the film. The 2005 film Green Street (and its sequels) are also based on the ICF, but instead the initials GSE ('Green Street Elite') were used. The ICF make an appearance in Irvine Welsh's novellas Ecstasy: Three Tales of Chemical Romance.
