= Jack Dunne =

Jack Dunne may refer to:

- Jack Dunne (hurler)
- Jack Dunne (rugby union)
- Jack Dunne (footballer)

== See also ==
- Jack Dunn (disambiguation)
- John Dunne (disambiguation)
