= John Thomas Dunn =

John Thomas Dunn may refer to:

- John T. Dunn (1838–1907), American politician
- John Thomas Dunn (chemist) (1858–1939), English chemist

== See also ==
- John Dunn (disambiguation)
