= William Adamson (disambiguation) =

William Adamson (1863–1936) was a Scottish politician and chairman of the British Labour Party.

William Adamson may also refer to:

- William Adamson (Australian politician) (1858–1924), Australian politician from Victoria
- William Adamson (businessman) (1832–1917), British businessman and member of the Legislative Council in Singapore
- William Adamson (Cannock MP) (1881–1945), British Labour politician
- William Adamson (Wisconsin politician) (1834–1907), American politician from Wisconsin
- William Agar Adamson (1800–1868), Canadian clergyman and author
- William C. Adamson (1854–1929), American politician and judge from Georgia
- Sir William Owen Campbell Adamson (1922–2000), British industrialist
- William Stuart Adamson (1958–2001), Scottish guitarist, vocalist, and songwriter
- Billy Adamson (1944–2013), Scottish musician

== See also ==
- William Adamson, character in Angels & Insects
