= Donnet (surname) =

Donnet is a French surname. Notable people with the surname include:

- Ferdinand-François-Auguste Donnet (1795–1882), French cardinal
- James Donnet (1816–1905), British Royal Navy surgeon
- Jean-Baptiste Donnet (1923–2014), French chemist
- Jenny Donnet (born 1963), Australian diver
- Martial Donnet (born 1956), Swiss alpine skier
- Matías Donnet (born 1980), Argentine footballer
- Michel Donnet (1917–2013), Belgian Air Force and Royal Air Force officer
