= John Dunn =

John, Jack, Johnny, Jon, or Jonathan Dunn may refer to:

== Entertainment ==
- John Dunn (pipemaker) (c. 1764–1820), inventor of keyed Northumbrian smallpipes
- John Dunn (actor) born O'Donoghue (1813–1875), Australian comic actor
- John Millard Dunn (1865–1936), organist and choirmaster
- John Dunn (violinist) (1866–1940), English violinist
- Johnny Dunn (1897–1937), American jazz trumpeter
- Jon Dunn (musician), American musician
- John Dunn (software developer) (1943–2018), American musician and art software developer
- John Dunn (animator) (1919–1983), cartoon writer for DePatie-Freleng and Looney Tunes
- John W. Dunn (painter) (1891–1975), American painter
- John Dunn (radio presenter) (1934–2004), BBC Radio 2 DJ

== Politics ==
- John Henry Dunn (1792–1854), businessman and political figure in Canada West
- John Dunn Jr. (assemblyman) (1827–1909), Wisconsin politician
- John T. Dunn (1838–1907), U.S. Representative from New Jersey
- John Dunn Jr. (1830–1892), South Australia politician
- John Freeman Dunn (1874–1954), English banker and stockbroker, barrister and Liberal Party politician
- John Dunn (1820–1860), British Conservative politician

== Religion ==
- John Woodham Dunn (1812–1883), Anglican vicar of Warkworth, Northumberland
- John Joseph Dunn (1870–1933), American prelate of the Catholic Church

== Sports ==
- Jack Dunn (baseball) (1872–1928), minor league baseball owner and manager
- John Dunn (cricketer) (1862–1892), English cricketer
- John Dunn (footballer, born 1888) (1888–1968), English football inside right
- John Dunn (footballer, born 1944), English footballer for Aston Villa and Charlton Athletic
- Jack Dunn (footballer, born 1994), English football player
- Johnny Dunn (footballer) (1881–1947), Australian rules footballer for Collingwood
- Jon Dunn (born 1981), American football player
- Jack Dunn (soccer) (born 1931), American soccer player
- Jack Dunn (figure skater) (1917–1938), British figure skater
- John Dunn (Australian rules footballer)
- John Dunn (American football) (born 1983), American football coach and former player
- John Dunn (American football, born 1888) (1888–1961), American football player and team owner
- Jack Dunn (rugby union) (1918–2003), New Zealand rugby union player

== Other ==
- John Dunn (pioneer lawyer), coffee planter and lawyer, recipient of a 1765 land grant in Putnam County, Florida
- John Dunn (miller) (1802–1894), flour miller, parliamentarian, and philanthropist in South Australia
- John Ainsworth Dunn (1831–1915), furniture manufacturer in Massachusetts
- John Robert Dunn (1833–1895), Scottish settler in South Africa
- John Dunn (bushranger) (1846–1866), Australian bush ranger
- John Dunn (explorer) (born 1954), explorer of the Canadian Arctic
- John "Pudgy" Dunn (1896–1937), St. Louis gangster
- John M. Dunn (1910–1949), American mobster, executed in 1949
- John Dunn (political theorist) (born 1940), professor of political theory at the University of Cambridge
- John Dunn (university president) (born 1945), president of Western Michigan University
- John Asher Dunn (1939–2017), American linguist
- John W. Dunn (architect), American architect
- Jon Michael Dunn (1941–2021), American educator
- John Thomas Dunn (chemist) (1858–1939), English chemist

== See also ==
- John Donne (1572–1631), English poet, satirist, lawyer and priest
- John Dunne (disambiguation)
- Dunn (surname)
