= Joan Dunn =

Joan Dunn may refer to:

- Joan Hunter Dunn (1915–2008), muse of Sir John Betjeman
- Joan Stafford-King-Harman (1918–2018), MI6 operative, known as Lady Dunn during her second marriage

== See also ==
- John Dunn (disambiguation)
