= Anthony John Mundella (journalist and educationalist) =

English journalist

Anthony Mundella
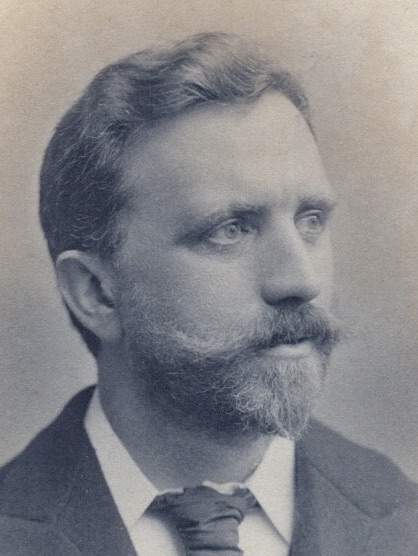
- Anthony Mundella, c1895
- Born: 24 September 1859; Nottingham, England
- Died: 31 March 1933 (aged 73); Matlock, England
- Education: Nottingham High School; Paris Lycée
- Occupations: Private secretary; Journalist and parliamentary correspondent; Secretary of National Education Association; School administrator
- Notable work: The Cry of the Children: A Reformer's Diary (1912)
- Parents: John Mundella; Emma Mundella née Wright
- Relatives: Rt Hon Anthony John Mundella PC (uncle); Emma Mundella (sister); Victor Mundella (brother)

Anthony John Mundella (24 September 1859 — 31 March 1933), known as Anthony Mundella, was an English journalist, education reformer and campaigner for child welfare. After working as Private Secretary to his namesake uncle, Rt Hon Anthony John Mundella, a Liberal Party Member of Parliament and Cabinet Minister, he became a journalist and parliamentary sketch writer for The Manchester Guardian. He was elected Chairman of the Press Gallery. Subsequently, he was for 35 years Secretary of the National Education Association, and campaigned for a free progressive system of national education, publicly controlled and free from sectarian interest. He was well known in the House of Commons and much sought after by MPs and government ministers for his wide knowledge and expertise in educational reform and child welfare. It is said that he was responsible more than any other for the abolition of the injurious employment of children of school age.

== Early life ==
Anthony Mundella was born in Nottingham, England, the second of a family of eight children. His father, John Mundella, a hosiery manufacturer in the family firm of Hine & Mundella, died when Anthony Mundella was 13. His uncle was Anthony John Mundella, a Liberal statesman and a member of William Ewart Gladstone's Cabinet. His grandfather, Antonio Mondelli, was an immigrant of uncertain background from Monte Olimpino, near Como in Lombardy. His mother, Emma Wright, was the daughter of William Wright, a Nottingham lace, thread and silk commission agent. His upbringing was Unitarian and his family was politically Liberal with a strong leaning amongst his surviving siblings towards education and its reform.

Mundella's general education was at the non-sectarian school attached to the Unitarian High Pavement Chapel in Nottingham, and then at Nottingham High School. At 13 he was sent to Paris to be educated at a lycée there. However, within a year of going to Paris his father's death caused the family income to be drastically reduced and as a consequence Mundella was brought back to Nottingham to be apprenticed.

He signed up for seven years to train as a commission agent with the firm of William Wright & Son, owned by his grandfather and his uncle. The company were lace, thread, and silk commission agents and dealers. Mundella served his apprenticeship for the full seven years, until his 21st birthday.

While apprenticed, Mundella continued to follow the family tradition of Unitarianism, inherited from his mother's family, and took a keen interest in the activities of the High Pavement Chapel in Nottingham which the family attended. He went to the weekday Bible class, belonged to Chapel societies, and was a frequent speaker at the debating society. As he grew older he led a class of young men, in whose progress he took a keen interest. He also followed his uncle A. J. Mundella, a captain in the Robin Hood Rifles, as a cadet, later progressing into the corps itself.

At the same time he became interested in politics, becoming Secretary of the Newark Division Liberal Association, and also started writing journalism, and contributing to local newspapers.

His lifelong interest in education was sparked as a young man in family discussions. Towards the end of his life he recalled: "The vision I learned to look for, from the talk of the elders around the domestic hearth, was a vision of Schools for all; provided by the rates; compulsion of the unwilling to attend; relief from the prohibitory fee; local elected Boards; and salaried officers for the administration, to set the teachers free for their great work of teaching."

== Private Secretary to A. J. Mundella ==
In 1880, Mundella's uncle, A. J. Mundella, a Liberal MP for Sheffield, became Vice-President of the Privy Council Committee on Education (in effect the Victorian equivalent of Secretary of State for Education) in William Gladstone's government. He invited his nephew, then 21, to come to London to serve as his private secretary.

Mundella moved to London to work for his uncle and began a life-long close connection with Westminster and its affairs, particularly in the fields of education and the welfare of children. He was well-placed to learn how Westminster, Whitehall, Parliament, politics, and politicians worked. He supported A. J. Mundella in the introduction of his Bill to complete the system of compulsion to attend school which became known as the Mundella Act (properly known as the Elementary Education Act 1880), which finally established the means to enforce all children being sent to school. He further supported his uncle in his work to reorganise technical education, including forming a single institution of the scientific schools at South Kensington in London, establishing the Normal School of Science and Royal School of Mines in October 1881 and in improving higher education in Wales. Mundella also aided his uncle in the further development of the South Kensington Museum (later the Victoria and Albert Museum), and the introduction of the educational code of 1882, which became known as the "Mundella Code". Improvement in the inspection of schools, including employing some female inspectors, and insisting that the health and mental capacity of children should be taken into consideration when examining their learning progress proceeded apace, as did beneficial change in teacher training. Mundella also supported his uncle in the determination to urge local government to provide cheap meals for children.

Gladstone's government fell in 1885, but Mundella continued by his uncle's side, through the General Election of October 1885, a brief period in opposition when his uncle remained on the Liberal front bench, and then the subsequent General Election in January 1886 which returned the Liberals to power. Gladstone appointed A. J. Mundella President of the Board of Trade with a place in the Cabinet. Mundella stayed working for his uncle in his new position until the Liberal government fell once again at the end of July 1886. Though A. J. Mundella continued to be an MP and later served a second, longer, term as President of the Board of Trade, Mundella junior left his uncle's service at this point, after 6 years in Westminster, and returned to Nottingham. In his time in Whitehall, Mundella had undoubtedly laid the firm foundation for his later campaigning and political lobbying in the field of education reform and the welfare of children.

== Nottingham ==
On his return to Nottingham at the age of 27, Mundella shared a house with a lively group of young men at 4 Upper College Street, which they called "The Chapter House". Among those living there with Mundella was the Rev Arthur Hamilton Baynes (who later became chaplain to the Archbishop of Canterbury, and then Bishop of Natal), solicitor Alfred Robinson, accountant W. R. Hamilton, Fabian socialist C. H. Grinling, and others.

Like-minded visitors to Nottingham were encouraged to stay at Upper College Street. Preachers of all kinds stayed there, and most of the original Fabians, including George Bernard Shaw on a number of occasions.

Mundella had ambitions to become a professional, full-time journalist, and he returned to casual reporting and writing for newspapers. The Unitarian minister of the High Pavement Chapel, Rev Richard Acland Armstrong, wrote a letter of introduction and recommendation for Mundella to C. P. Scott, the Editor of The Manchester Guardian, stating that Mundella had a desire to be a political journalist for the paper. Mundella's work had already attracted the attention of Scott, and in 1889 he invited Mundella to report full-time for the paper from London, and more particularly, from Westminster.

== The Manchester Guardian ==
Mundella returned to London and for the next 12 years reported on the doings of Westminster, in the Press Gallery and in the Lobby, notably contributing for much of this period the "brilliantly written" nightly sketch of the proceedings of both Houses of Parliament. He also wrote a wide range of other contributions for the newspaper, including reporting on parliamentary by-elections, Labour Day in London and the funeral of WE Gladstone in May 1898, though, as was usual in newspapers of the time, his contributions were uncredited in the paper. His interest in education, aroused during his time serving as his uncle's Private Secretary, also led to Mundella covering matters such as the Poor Law Schools Committee and the London School Board.

Mundella's relationship with Scott was not always smooth. On one occasion the Editor complained that a parliamentary sketch Mundella had written was deemed to be unsuitable for publication. Scott also proposed that Mundella should be employed at the Manchester office of the newspaper during the parliamentary recesses, but Mundella refused, saying that he preferred to remain in London. Mundella's wages were also discussed between them, Mundella writing a statement entitled "The Standard Rate of Wages in the Parliamentary Gallery" outlining how much less he was receiving than parliamentary journalists on other newspapers.

During his time reporting from Parliament, his journalist colleagues elected him Chairman of the Press Gallery, and as such he was viewed as "the equal of anyone there, for his shrewd judgement and knowledge of affairs. As a result of this acumen his column in the paper was always worth reading by politically minded people." When he resigned from the Manchester Guardian he was allowed to retain permanently his parliamentary lobby ticket which afforded him privileged access to Ministers, MPs and Lords, which was notably beneficial while he pursued his subsequent activities as a reforming educationalist.

== The School Board for London ==
Despite his full-time work for The Manchester Guardian, Mundella's paramount interest was education. Since his time as Private Secretary to his uncle A. J. Mundella during the period when the MP held the education portfolio in government, Mundella junior became immersed in the history of education, its principles and its administrative details, becoming "a veritable walking encyclopaedia, constantly consulted even by experts, and by protagonists on both sides of the subject". Seeking to pursue his desire for educational reform and to better the lives of children, he eagerly took up an opportunity to be co-opted on to the School Board for London (colloquially known as the London School Board) when a casual vacancy arose following the resignation of William Lygon, 7th Earl Beauchamp. Mundella took his place on the Board, representing the Finsbury Division, on 23 March 1899.

The Elementary Education Act 1870 created elected school boards in England and Wales, which had the power to build and run schools, and could compel attendance between the ages of five and thirteen. In London the board covered the whole area of the Metropolitan Board of Works, the area now known as Inner London. Mundella was to remain a devoted member for three years, being re-elected in 1900. He stood as a Progressive, allied to the parliamentary Liberal Party and also supported by some Labour activists. As well as being supporters of free, compulsory and non-sectarian education, the Progressives were much in favour of manual and physical training, the provision of secondary schools, swimming pools and gymnasiums, free school meals and the direct employment of labour. The Progressives were in the majority on the Board; their opponents, the Moderates, were supported by the Conservative and Unionist Party and were in favour of low rates, Bible-teaching in schools and voluntary sectarian schools. Mundella was Vice-Chairman of the board's Works Committee and a member of the School Accommodation Committee. He visited schools, encouraged teachers, interviewed parents and promoted both the efficiency of the work and the amenities connected with it.

He became the Progressive Whip and found a place as the right-hand man of the board's leader the Hon Edward Lyulph Stanley (afterwards Lord Sheffield) and was powerfully active in the long fight to save public elementary schools from the sectarian control and dogmatic teaching proposed by the Moderates on the board. He spoke frequently in opposition to them, and furnished other Progressive members with facts and argument out of his store of knowledge on education. He wrote booklets, articles and leaflets and compiled multiple statistics in pursuit of progressive reform. Mundella, together with Lyulph Stanley and Graham Wallas, were the chief figures on the Board.

Though the school boards were deemed to have been successful, they were seen as bureaucratic and expensive. The Education Act 1902 abolished them and replaced them with local education authorities. In London the school board's responsibilities were transferred to the London County Council in May 1904. Mundella was never reconciled to the Education Act 1902 and the resulting abolition of the board and its transfer to the London County Council. He resigned from the board in April 1902.

== The National Education Association ==
While still writing for The Manchester Guardian, Mundella's passion for the advancement of education led him to take on the position of Secretary of the National Education Association (NEA). The NEA was formed in 1888 as a pioneer pressure group to promote a "free progressive system of national education, publicly controlled and free from sectarian interest" both by publicising and advancing the School Board System (which was supported by rates) and by undermining denominational and private schools (which were supported only by donations and fees). The Association was formally constituted in 1889 under the presidency of Mundella's uncle, A. J. Mundella MP. It acted as the education sub-committee of the Liberation Society, whose aims were the disestablishment of the Church of England, the attainment of religious equality for non-conformists, and the preservation of the rights of conscience.

Mundella became an Executive member of the NEA in 1897, and soon after was appointed Secretary, a position he was to hold for 35 years until his death. The NEA was the perfect vehicle for Mundella's passion for the improved administration of education, and his Westminster apprenticeship, first as his uncle's Private Secretary, and then as The Manchester Guardian's London and parliamentary correspondent, gave him the understanding, the knowledge, and the connections to further the Association's aims, and, while doing so, to campaign for his other - connected - passions: the release of youngsters from the ill-paid iniquities of child labour, and the welfare of distressed and poor children.

He built the Association to be a respected, influential (while small) pressure group in a largely indifferent world. And Mundella himself (making good use of his retained parliamentary lobby ticket which allowed him unconstrained access to both Houses of Parliament) was a supreme lobbyist who, more than any other, forced the attention of politicians towards the Association's progressive educational policy. He was the accepted fount of wisdom on the history of education, its principles, and its administrative details. He was said to have become a "veritable walking encyclopaedia, constantly consulted even by experts, and by protagonists on both sides". He lobbied in parliament, was approached by MPs and peers of all parties, and was seen as a skilled propagandist, using personal persuasion, the press, and every known parliamentary technique. He was seen as a "trusted advisor of many statesmen and politicians, supplying them with accurate facts and figures, investing them with some of his keenness, and criticising fearlessly when he thought it necessary",

One of his colleagues in the NEA recalled that "He had a marvellous grasp of detail, and an almost uncanny memory; he was a perfect storehouse of knowledge on education as well as on other subjects". An obituarist noted: "He was a familiar figure in the lobby when education was under discussion. His pithy and well informed letters to the press displayed his thorough mastery of the subject which had engrossed his life."

Following the failure (to Mundella's sorrow) to defeat the Education Act 1902, leading members of both Houses of Parliament expressed their high appreciation of his work. Henry Campbell-Bannerman, the then Leader of the Liberal Party (later Prime Minister), wrote to him to congratulate him on the "immense service" done by him and the Association: "Your complete knowledge, the soundness of your views, your watchfulness, zeal and alertness were the main source from which opponents of the Act drew their strength, and you deserve both individually and officially our warmest thanks."

Mundella also served as Secretary of London County Council's Committee on Children's Care.

As part of his NEA campaigning, Mundella took over the editorship of a small, but increasingly influential, and indeed powerful, monthly journal, The School Child and Juvenile Worker. It was aimed at those whose responsibility was the extra-familial care of children, and at school managers, but was also widely circulated to parliamentarians and as a matter of course to all members of the NEA. It reviewed books, highlighted abuses, gave details of legislation, commented on educational administration and interpreted official policy. It had started publication in 1910, but Mundella took it over privately in 1915. Though it was not the Association's magazine, it was taken for granted that it was owned by the NEA. It was finally officially designated as an NEA publication in 1932.

In pursuit of his and the NEA's objectives Mundella wrote many newspaper articles and published a large number of pamphlets, including in 1912 his most powerful and widely respected treatise: The Cry of the Children: A Reformer's Diary.

== Committee on Wage Earning Children ==
As time went on, Mundella's involvement in, and influence on, education and the cause of children spread. Aside from school education, Mundella (following the example of his uncle) was also deeply concerned in the matter of children who were wage-earning and the lack of adequate protection for them. He was inspired to form the Committee on Wage Earning Children in 1899. The committee's first report, written by Mundella, revealed that many young children worked excessive hours as well as having to attend school; 70 to 100 hours work a week was not unusual. Mundella wrote about the committee's work, framed parliamentary bills, lobbied amendments, and pressured for the Employment of Children Act 1903. Many of the Acts of Parliament which safeguarded the rights of poor children were initiated and carried through by his "untiring devotion and wise guidance, always behind the scene" One colleague described him as undoubtedly the greatest living authority on Parliamentary measures concerning young children.

"He kept in motion a sustained flow of pressure upon Departments of State and MPs. He plied them with facts, he prodded them with draft Bills, he wielded all the weapons of personal persuasion, press publicity and Parliamentary technique known to the skilled propagandist. It is now possible to say that injurious employment of children of school age is almost abolished, and we owe it to Mundella more than any one person."

== Consultative Committee of the Board of Education ==
In addition to his duties at the NEA, Mundella sat on the Consultative Committee of the Board of Education from 1920 to 1928. While there he rendered valuable help in the committee's reports on the differentiation of curricula between the sexes in secondary schools and on the education of adolescents.

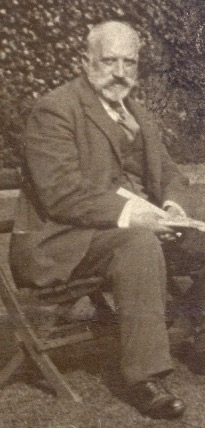
Anthony Mundella, 04 September 1927

== School manager ==
As well as his work with the NEA and various committees, in 1904 Mundella became a School Manager with the aim of keeping in touch with teachers and with children, particularly those who had been "overlooked in the 'muddle' and din of battle".

After three years he became Chairman of the panel of Managers who were responsible for the supervision of a number of large schools in the St Pancras area of London. Mundella's management panel was one of the most influential in the capital. He held this position for 22 years until ill-health forced his resignation.

An obituary recorded of this period of his life that "he was regarded by the teaching staffs of his schools with deep respect and real affection. His handsome presence and dignified bearing, combined with his genial personality and expert knowledge of educational affairs gave Managers and teachers alike a pride in his leadership."

== Personal life ==
Mundella remained single, but was never alone as he maintained a vast crowd of friends and acquaintances. Described as "a clubbable man" he did, however, form only a very few intimate friendships. Despite his lifelong determined care for the welfare of children he was said to be somewhat shy and retiring in their presence.

While working in London he shared rooms with his unmarried sister, the composer Emma Mundella, and after her death he lived with his brother, the physicist and teacher Victor Mundella, and their mother. Following their mother's death he lived for several years at the National Liberal Club, of which he had been a member since 1891, being a strong supporter of its educational and political activities, and ultimately its Vice-Chairman.

Mundella never hid his Unitarian convictions, held since childhood, though he never obtruded them. He had a keen interest in literature, art and music and enjoyed nature, escaping London for the countryside whenever he could and indulging in long summer walking tours.

He was a heavy smoker and towards the end of his life had several years of ill-health.

== Death ==
From June 1932 Mundella's health became progressively worse. In early 1933 he travelled to Smedley's Hydro in Matlock, Derbyshire for a rest and change, but while there he suffered a short illness, tended by his sister Florence Golding, and died there on 31 March 1933. He was buried in the nearby Derbyshire town of Bakewell. He left £2,384 5s 4d to his two surviving sisters.

His death occasioned a great deal of sadness in London. A special edition of The School Child and Juvenile Worker was published in which a multitude of friends and colleagues paid tribute. The then leader of the Liberal Party, Herbert Samuel, paid tribute to his "old friend, who rendered such long and efficient service to so many good public causes".

The Liberal MP Sir Francis Acland said: "We have lost not only a true friend to all that was best in education, but a true man. His faithfulness, his straightforwardness, his thoroughness, and above all his modesty made him a rare figure."

The Unitarian journal, The Inquirer, wrote: 'His memory will live as that of a true, high-principled, public-spirited comrade, whose loyalty was never in doubt, and as a self-forgetting, generous, liberal-minded friend."
