= 1897 Diamond Jubilee Honours =

British government recognitions

The Diamond Jubilee Honours for the British Empire were announced on 22 June 1897 to celebrate the Diamond Jubilee of Queen Victoria on 20 June 1897.

The recipients of honours are displayed here as they were styled before their new honour, and arranged by honour, with classes (Knight Grand Cross, etc.) and then divisions (Military, Civil, etc.) as appropriate.

== Earldom ==
- The Lord Egerton.

== Baron ==
- The Earl of Glasgow GCMG, by the name, style and title of Baron Fairlie, of Fairlie in the County of Ayr
- Viscount Downe, by the name, style and title of Baron Dawnay, of Danby in the North Riding of the County of York
- Lord Justice Lopes, by the name, style and title of Baron Ludlow, of Heywood in the County of Wiltshire
- Ion Trant Hamilton, by the name, style and title of Baron HolmPatrick, of HolmPatrick, in the County of Dublin
- Sir John Burns Bt, by the name, style and title of Baron Inverclyde, of Castle Wemyss in the county Renfrew
- Sir Donald Smith GCMG, by the name, style and title of Baron Strathcona and Mount Royal, of Glencoe in the County of Argyll and of Mount Royal in the Province of Quebec and Dominion of Canada

== Privy Council (PC) ==
- Wilfrid Laurier.
- George Reid.
- Sir George Turner KCMG.
- Richard Seddon.
- Sir Hugh Nelson KCMG.
- Sir John Sprigg.
- Charles Kingston.
- Sir William Whiteway KCMG.
- Sir Edward Braddon KCMG.
- Sir John Forrest KCMG.
- Harry Escombe.
- Sir Herbert Maxwell Bt MP.
- W. H. Lecky MP.
- John Talbot MP.
- John Wharton MP.

== Baronet ==
- The Lord Mayor. (Sir George Faudel Faudel-Phillips, 1st Baronet)
- Sir William MacCormac, President of the Royal College of Surgeons.
- Sir John Blundell Maple MP.
- David Gamble CB.
- John Gilmour, of Montrave.
- Hugh Ellis-Nanney.
- George Ernest Paget, Chairman of the Midland Railway.
- Theophilus Peel, worsted manufacturer
- James Pender MP.
- Cuthbert Quilter MP.
- Frederick Ripley.
- Thomas Smith FRCS, Surgeon-Extraordinary to Her Majesty.
- Samuel Wilks, President of the Royal College of Physicians, and Physician Extraordinary to Her Majesty.
- Lindsay Wood.

== Knight ==
- Henry Howe Bemrose MP.
- Charles William Cayzer MP.
- Thomas George Fardell MP.
- John A. Willox MP.
- S. B. Bancroft
- Wyke Bayliss, President of the Royal Society of British Artists.
- Alexander Richardson Binnie, Engineer to the London County Council.
- J. Frederick Bridge MusDoc.
- Professor Crookes FRS.
- John Dunne, Chief Constable of Cumberland and Westmorland.
- William R. Gowers MD FRS University Hospital
- (Andrew) Charles Howard, Assistant Commissioner, Metropolitan Police
- Felix Mackenzie, Forres.
- George C. Martin MusDoc.
- Colonel Henry Oldham, Lieutenant of Her Majesty's Honourable Corps of Gentlemen-at-Arms.
- James Thompson Ritchie, Sheriff of London
- Robert Hargreaves Rogers, Sheriff of London
- John F. L. Rolleston, Leicester.
- Judge William Lucius Selfe, County Court judge.
- Felix Semon MD St Thomas's Hospital
- George John Smith of Treliske.
- James Thompson, General Manager of the Caledonian Railway.
- Lieutenant-Colonel Horatio Page Vance, Lieutenant of Her Majesty's Royal Body Guard of Yeomen of the Guard.
- James Vaughan, Bow Street Magistrate
- Henry Arthur White
- James Smith Lord Mayor of Birmingham
- The Lord Mayor of York (Christopher Annakin Milward)
- The Mayor of Bolton (Lt Col. Sir Benjamin Alfred Dobson)
- The Mayor of Brighton (John George Blaker)
- The Mayor of Norwich (Charles Rackham Gilman)
- The Mayor of Salford (Richard Mottram)
- The Mayor of Windsor
- Patrick Playfair CIE, late President of the Calcutta Chamber of Commerce.
- Lieutenant-Colonel George Montgomerie Moore CIE, President of the Madras Municipality.
- George Cotton, Businessman, Sheriff of Bombay (28 August)
- William Burgess Goldsmith, RN, Captain of Royal yacht HMY Alberta (31 August)
- John Hawkins Hagarty DCL, late Chief Justice of Ontario (15 September)
- George Montgomerie James Moore, President of Madras Municipality (15 September)
- Melbourne McTaggart Tait QC, Chief Justice, Montreal (29 September)
- Henry Hubert Juta QC, Speaker of the House of Assembly, Cape of Good Hope.
- Thomas Naghten Fitzgerald, Senior Surgeon to the Melbourne Hospital, Victoria.
- John Cheyne, QC, Procurator of the Church of Scotland (7 October)
- Andrew McDonald, Lord Provost of Edinburgh (7 October)
- Thomas Wardlaw Taylor QC, Chief Justice of Manitoba (22 October)
- John Charles Bigham, Justice of High Court (25 November)
- Charles John Darling, Justice of High Court (25 November)
- Arthur Moseley Chanell, Justice of High Court (25 November)
- Charles George Walpole, Chief Justice of the Bahamas (25 November)

== Order of the Star of India ==
=== Knight Grand Commander (GCSI) ===
- Maharaja Vyankatesh Raman Singh Bahadur, Chief of Rewa.
- Sir Joseph Dalton Hooker KCSI CB MD.
- Maharaja Sir Bir Shumsher Jang Rana Bahadur KCSI, Prime Minister of Nepal.
- Sir Antony Patrick MacDonnell KCSI, Lieutenant-Governor of the North-Western Provinces.
- Lieutenant Colonel Maharaj Dhiraj Sir Partab Singh Bahadur KCSI, of Jodhpur.
- Lieutenant-General Richard Strachey CSI, Royal Engineers.

=== Knight Commander (KCSI) ===
- William Mackworth Young CSI, Lieutenant-Governor of the Punjab.
- Sri Raja Rama Varma of Cochin.
- Charles James Lyall CSI CIE, Chief Commissioner of the Central Provinces.
- Robert Joseph Crosthwaite CSI, Agent to the Governor-General in Rajputana.
- William John Cuningham CSI, Secretary to the Government of India in the Foreign Department.
- Major-General Montagu Gilbert Gerard CB CSI, Indian Staff Corps.
- Raja Jagatjit Singh Bahadur of Kapurthala.
- Richard Udny CSI, Indian Civil Service.
- Colonel Howard Melliss CSI, Inspector-General of Imperial Service Troops.

=== Companion (CSI) ===
- Hugh Shakespear Barnes, Agent to the Governor-General in Baluchistan.
- Clement Sneyd Colvin, Secretary in the Public Works Department, India Office.
- Surgeon-Major-General William Roe Hooper, President of the Medical Board, India Office.
- John Molesworth Macpherson, Secretary to the Government of India in the Legislative Department.
- James Monteath, Chief Secretary to the Government of Bombay.
- Charles Walter Bolton, Chief Secretary to the Government of Bengal
- Horace Frederick D'Oyly Moule, Indian Civil Service.
- Surgeon-Major-General James Cleghorn MD, Director-General of the Indian Medical Service.
- Colonel Thomas Gracey, Royal Engineers, Director-General of Railways in India.
- Colonel James Aloysius Miley, Deputy Secretary in the Military Department, India.
- Colonel Andrew Wilson Baird, Royal Engineers, late Master of the Calcutta Mint.
- Kachar Ala Chela, Chief of Jasdan.
- Henry Babington Smith, Private Secretary to The Viceroy.
- Henry Aiken Anderson, Indian Civil Service.
- Captain Arthur Henry MacMahon CIE, Indian Staff Corps.
- Robert Steel
- Sardar Bahadur Kashi Rao Sarve, Commander-in-Chief of The Maharaja Sindhia's Army.

== Order of the Indian Empire ==
=== Knight Grand Commander (GCIE) ===
- Sir Banwar Pal Deo Bahadur Yadukul Chandra Bhal KCIE, Maharaja of Karauli.
- Faiz Muhammad Khan, Talpur, Mir of Khairpur in Sind.
- Sir Lakshmeshwar Singh Bahadur KCIE, Maharaja of Darbhanga.
- Sir Bhagwut Singh KCIE, Thakur Saheb of Gondal.
- General Crawford Trotter Chamberlain CSI.

=== Knight Commander (KCIE) ===
- Henry William Bliss CIE.
- Nawab Amir-ud-din Ahmad Khan Bahadur CIE, Chief of Loharu.
- Colonel William Sinclair Smith Bisset CIE, Royal Engineers, Secretary to the Government of India in the Public Works Department.
- Major-General Edward Stedman CB, Indian Staff Corps.
- John Jardine, Indian Civil Service (retired).
- Rear-Admiral John Hext CIE, Royal Navy (retired), Director of the Royal Indian Marine.
- Mancherjee Merwanjee Bhownaggree CIE.
- Colonel Thomas Hungerford Holdich CB CIE, Royal Engineers.
- James MacNab Campbell CIE, Indian Civil Service.
- Muhammad Munawwar Ali, Khan Bahadur, Prince of Arcot.
- George William Allen CIE.
- Nawab Bahadur Khwaja Ahsan-ulla CIE, of Dacca.

=== Companion (CIE) ===
- M. R. Ry Paiiappakharn Ananda Charlu, Vidia Vinodha, Rai Bahadur.
- Colonel Russell Richard Pulford, Royal Engineers.
- Colonel Algernon George Arnold Durand CB, Indian Staff Corps.
- Benjamin Traill ffinch, Director-in-Chief, Indo-European Telegraph Department.
- Frederick Shore Bullock, Indian Civil Service.
- Charles Henry Reynolds, Director-General of Telegraphs in India.
- Lieutenant-Colonel Beauchamp Duff, Military Secretary to the Commander-in-Chief in India.
- Lieutenant-Colonel Robert Alexander Wahab, Royal Engineers.
- Major Nawab Muhammad Ali Beg, Afsar-i-Jang, Bahadur, Commandant of the Hyderabad Imperial Service Lancers.
- Edwin Darlington, late Chief Collector of Customs in Burma.
- James Strachan, Engineer and Secretary to the Karachi Municipality.
- Poona Nursingarow Krishna Murti, Mysore State Council.
- The Revd Dr John Husband FRCS, Chairman of the Ajmere Municipal Committee.
- Dr Waldemar Mordecai Haffkine.
- Dr Augustus Frederick Rudolf Hoernle, Principal of the Calcutta Madrasa.
- Edward Nicholl, Secretary to the Amritsar Municipality.
- Rustamjee Dhanjibhai Mehta, ex-Sheriff of Calcutta.
- Charles Godolphin William Hastings, Punjab Police.
- Khan Bahadur Mancherjee Rustomji Dholu, Political Department, Aden.
- Commander Arthur Whatley Chitty, late Indian Navy.
- Rai Daulat Ram, Bahadur, Superintendent of Post Offices, Simla Division of the Punjab.

== Order of St Michael and St George ==
=== Knight Grand Cross (GCMG) ===
- Viscount Gormanston KCMG, Governor and Commander-in-Chief of the Colony of Tasmania.
- Sir Walter Francis Hely-Hutchinson KCMG, Governor and Commander-in-Chief of the Colony of Natal.
- Sir Alfred Milner KCB, Governor and Commander-in-Chief of the Colony of the Cape of Good Hope and Her Majesty's High Commissioner for South Africa.
- Wilfrid Laurier, President of the Privy Council and Premier of the Dominion of Canada.
- Sir Richard John Cartwright KCMG, Minister of Trade and Commerce for the Dominion of Canada.
- Sir William Robinson KCMG, Governor and Commander-in-Chief of the Colony of Hong Kong.
- Sir Henry Arthur Blake KCMG, Captain-General and Governor-in-Chief of the Island of Jamaica.
- Sir Oliver Mowat KCMG, Minister of Justice fur the Dominion of Canada.

=== Knight Commander (KCMG) ===
- Sir William Lambert Dobson, Chief Justice of the Colony of Tasmania, who has on several occasions administered the Government of the Colony in the absence of the Governor.
- Sir Frederick Matthew Darley, Lieutenant-Governor of the Colony of New South Wales and Chief Justice of the Supreme Court of that Colony.
- Colonel Frederick Cardew CMG, Governor and Commander-in-Chief of the Colony of Sierra Leone.
- George Airey Kirkpatrick, Lieutenant-Governor of the Province of Ontario, in the Dominion of Canada.
- William Alexander Baillie Hamilton CB CMG, Chief Clerk of the Colonial Department.
- Sandford Fleming CMG, for services connected with the Dominion of Canada.
- Frederick Richard Saunders CMG, Treasurer of the Island of Ceylon.
- Frank Athelstane Swettenham CMG, Resident-General for the Federation of the Protected States of the Malay Peninsula.
- Clement Courtenay Knollys CMG, Colonial Secretary of the Colony of Trinidad and Tobago.
- Count Strickland della Catena CMG, Chief Secretary to the Government of the Island of Malta.
- Cavendish Boyle CMG, Government Secretary of the Colony of British Guiana.
- Charles Gage Brown MD CMG, Medical Adviser to the Colonial Office.
- Walter Peace CMG, Agent-General in London for the Colony of Natal.
- Godfrey Yeatman Lagden CMG, Government Secretary and Accountant of Basutoland.
- Horace Tozer, Colonial Secretary of the Colony of Queensland.
- Lewis Henry Davies, Minister of Marine and Fisheries for the Dominion of Canada.
- Henry Cuthbert, Solicitor-General of the Colony of Victoria.
- Edward Montague Nelson, for services in connection with the Australasian Colonies.

Honorary

- Ibrahim, Sultan of the State and Territory of Johore

=== Companion (CMG) ===
- Henry Cockburn Stewart, Administrator of the Seychelles Islands.
- Philip Arthur Templer, Administrator of the Presidency of Dominica.
- Harry Langhorne Thompson, Administrator of the Island of St; Vincent.
- James Robert Dickson, Secretary for Railways of the Colony of Queensland.
- Colonel Richard Henry Jelf RE, in recognition of services as Chairman of the Sanitary Commission, Gibraltar.
- Colonel John Montgomery Templeton, commanding the Militia Infantry Brigade in the Colony of Victoria.
- Colonel Alfred Freeman, Assistant Quartermaster – General in the Colony of Victoria.
- Colonel John Alexander Man, late Commandant of the Local Forces of the Colony of Trinidad and Tobago.
- Captain Charles Tyrwhitt Dawkins, for services rendered as Military Secretary and as Acting Imperial Secretary to the Governor and Commander-in-Chief of the Cape of Good Hope.
- Captain Arthur Henderson Young, Chief Secretary to the Government of Cyprus.
- Donald William Stewart, British Resident at Coomassie.
- Frederick Obadiah Adrian, Officer of Arms of the Order of St Michael and St George.
- Louis Honore Frechette, for services in connection with Literature in the Dominion of Canada.
- John Mortimer Courtney, Deputy Minister of Finance for the Dominion of Canada.
- John Lorn McDougall, Auditor-General for the Dominion of Canada.
- William White, Deputy Postmaster-General for the Dominion of Canada.
- Captain William Rooke Creswell (late RN), of the Naval Defence Force of the Colony of South Australia.
- Charles Yelverton O'Connor, Engineer-in-Chief of the Government Railways in the Colony of Western Australia.
- Henri Lecle'zio, Member of the Executive Council of the Colony of Mauritius.
- Alexander Williamson, Member of the Executive Council of the Colony of British Honduras.
- Catchick Paul Chater, Member of the Executive and Legislative Council of the Colony of Hong Kong.
- James William Parris, Member of the Legislative' Council of the Island of Barbados.
- William Adamson, late Unofficial Member of the Legislative Council of the Straits Settlements.
- John Charles Macglashan, late Auditor-General of the Island of Jamaica.
- Michael McTurk, Stipendiary Magistrate in the Colony of British Guiana.
- Wilfred Collet, Secretary to the High Commissioner 'for the Western Pacific.
- John William Rowland, Colonial Surgeon of the Colony of Lagos.
- John Henry Ozanne, Travelling Commissioner for the Colony of the Gambia.

Honorary

- Jaafar B. Hadji Mohamed, Dato Mentri Besar of Johore.

== Order of the Bath ==
=== Great Master ===
- Field-Marshal The Prince of Wales KG GCB &c.

=== Knight Grand Cross (GCB) ===
Honorary (Civil Division)

- Prince Frederick Charles of Hesse.

Military Division

- General Sir Anthony Blaxland Stransham KCB, Royal Marines.
- Lieutenant-General (local General) Sir George Stuart White GCIE KCB VC, Commander-in-Chief, East Indies.
- Major-General and Honorary Lieutenant-General Sir Henry Marshman Havelock-Allan Bt KCB VC, Colonel, the Royal Irish Regiment.
- Admiral Sir Nowell Salmon KCB VC, Commander-in-Chief, Portsmouth.
- Admiral Sir Algernon McLennan Lyons KCB ADC.
- Admiral Sir Michael Culme-Seymour Bt KCB.

Civil Division

- Sir Spencer Cecil Brabazon Ponsonby-Fane KCB, Comptroller of Accounts, Lord Chamberlain's Department.
- Sir Arthur Lawrence Haliburton KCB, Permanent Under-Secretary of State, War Office.
- Colonel Sir Edward Ridley Colborne Bradford KCB KCSI, Aide-de-Camp to The Queen, Commissioner of the Metropolitan Police.
- Sir Nicholas Roderick O'Conor GCMG KCB, Ambassador Extraordinary and Minister Plenipotentiary at St. Petersburg.
- Sir Horace Rumbold Bt GCMG, Ambassador Extraordinary and Minister Plenipotentiary at Vienna.

=== Knight Commander (KCB) ===
Military Division

- Lieutenant-General and Honorary General Sir William Hope Bt CB.
- Surgeon-General Charles Alexander Gordon CB, Honorary Physician to The Queen.
- Admiral William Garnham Luard CB.
- Admiral George Granville Randolph CB.
- Major-General and Honorary Lieutenant-General James Clerk Rattray CB.
- General John Irvine Murray CB, Indian Staff Corps.
- General Frederick Richard Maunsell CB, Colonel Commandant, Royal (late Bengal) Engineers.
- Major-General and Honorary Lieutenant-General Henry Le Geyt Bruce CB, (late Bengal) Artillery.
- Major-General Alexander James Hardy Elliot CB, Colonel, 6th Dragoon Guards.
- General Æneas Perkins CB, Colonel Commandant, Royal (late Bengal) Engineers.
- Colonel Francis Howell Jenkins CB, Indian Staff Corps.
- Lieutenant-General Henry Richard Legge Newdigate CB.
- Lieutenant-General Henry Moore CB CIE, Indian Staff Corps.
- Major-General George Luck CB, Inspector-General of Cavalry in Great Britain and Ireland.
- Inspector-General of Hospitals and Fleets Henry Frederick Norbury CB.
- General William Anthony Gib CB, Indian Staff Corps.
- Major-General Joseph Philips CB, Royal Marines.
- Vice-Admiral Henry Frederick Nicholson CB.
- General Howard Button Jones CB, Royal Marines.
- Lieutenant-General Henry Clement Wilkinson CB, Colonel, 4th Dragoon Guards.
- Lieutenant-General William Howley Goodenough CB, Royal Artillery, Commanding the Troops, South Africa.
- Major-General James Makgiil Heriot Maitland CB, Royal Engineers.
- Lieutenant-General Charles Edward Nairne CB, Royal Artillery, Commanding the Forces, Bombay.
- Vice-Admiral Edward Hobart Seymour CB.
- Lieutenant-General Cecil James East CB, Governor and Commandant, Royal Military College.
- Major-General William Galbraith CB, Commanding a First Class District in India.
- Vice-Admiral Henry Frederick Stephenson CB.
- Major-General James Alleyne CB, Royal Artillery, Commanding Royal Artillery, Aldershot.
- Inspector-General of Hospitals and Fleets James John Lewis Donnet.
- Vice-Admiral James Elphinstone Erskine.
- Vice-Admiral Nathaniel Bowden-Smith.
- Lieutenant-General Edwin Markham, Royal Artillery, Inspector-General of Ordnance, Headquarters.
- Vice-Admiral William Robert Kennedy.

Civil Division

- Sir Francis Knollys KCMG CB, Private Secretary to The Prince of Wales.
- George Lawson CB, Assistant Under Secretary of State, War Office.
- Sir John Gardner Dillman Engleheart CB, Clerk of the Council of the Duchy of Lancaster.
- Edwin Henry Egerton CB, Envoy Extraordinary and Minister Plenipotentiary at Athens.
- Colonel Edward Talbot Thackeray CB VC (Military Division).
- Henry Craik CB, Secretary, Scotch Education Department.
- John Skelton CB, Vice-President, Local Government Board for Scotland.
- Sir Albert William Woods KCMG CB, Garter Principal King of Arms.
- Henry Churchill Maxwell Lyte CB, Deputy Keeper, Public Record Office.
- Frederic Lacey Robinson CB, Deputy Chairman, Board of Inland Revenue.
- Sir Andrew Reed CB, Inspector-General, Royal Irish Constabulary.
- Richard Thorne Thorne CB, Medical Officer to the Local Government Board.
- Joseph Norman Lockyer CB, Professor of Astronomy, Royal College of Science.
- John Wolfe Barry CB.
- John Taylor CB, Surveyor, Office of Works.
- Honorary Lieutenant-Colonel (retired) Henry Smith CB, Commissioner of the City of London Police.
- Sir Francis Henry Jeune, President of the Probate, Divorce, and Admiralty Division of the High Court of Justice, Judge Advocate-General.
- Sir John Hassard, Apparitor-General, Consistory Court of The Bishop of London.
- Henry Burdett
- Edward Frankland, Water Analyst to the Local Government Board.
- William Huggins
- William Blake Richmond
- Rear-Admiral William James Lloyd Wharton CB, Hydrographer of the Admiralty.
- Chief Inspector of Machinery Albert John Durston CB, Engineer-in-Chief of the Navy.
- Honorary Colonel Samuel Brise Ruggles Brise CB, 4th Battalion the Essex Regiment.
- Lieutenant-Colonel and Honorary Colonel Sir Charles Watkin Shakerley Bt CB, late 5th Volunteer Battalion the Cheshire Regiment.
- Honorary Colonel Sir Henry Wilmot Bt CB VC, 1st Volunteer Battalion the Sherwood Foresters (Derbyshire Regiment).
- Lieutenant-Colonel and Honorary Colonel Robert Thomas White-Thomson CB, late 4th Battalion the Devonshire Regiment.

=== Companion (CB) ===
Military Division

- Inspector-General of Hospitals and Fleets Henry Macdonnell, Royal Navy.
- Captain Arthur William Moore CMG, Royal Navy.
- Captain John Pakenham Pipon CMG, Royal Navy, Captain of the Royal Naval College.
- Captain John Durnford DSO, Royal Navy.
- Captain John Mackenzie McQuhae, Royal Navy.
- Lieutenant-Colonel Herbert St. George Schomberg, Royal Marine Light Infantry.
- Surgeon-Major-General Charles Sibthorpe, Indian Medical Service.
- Major-General Stuart James Nicholson, Royal Artillery, Commanding Royal Artillery, Southern District.
- Colonel Russell Upcher DSO, Commanding the 5th and 68th Regimental Districts.
- Colonel Sir Arthur William Mackworth Bt, Colonel on the Staff, Commanding Royal Engineer, Aldershot..
- Colonel Neville Gerald Lyttelton, Assistant Adjutant-General, Headquarters.
- Colonel Henry Hildyard, Commandant Staff College.
- Chief Paymaster and Honorary Colonel Thomas William Drage, Army Pay Department.
- Colonel Alfred Edward Turner CB (Civil), Assistant Adjutant-General for Royal Artillery, Headquarters.
- Lieutenant-Colonel and Colonel John Compton Hanford.
- Colonel Douglas Alexander Scott DSO, Assistant Adjutant-General for Royal Engineers, Headquarters.
- Lieutenant-Colonel and Colonel (temporary Major-General) Sir Edwin Henry Hayter Collen KCIE, Indian Staff Corps, Member of the Council of the Governor-General of India.
- Lieutenant-Colonel and Brevet Colonel Charles Frederick Hughes, Indian Staff Corps.
- Colonel (Brigadier-General) George Simpson, Indian Staff Corps, Deputy Adjutant-General in India.
- Colonel Elliott Alexander Money, Indian Staff Corps, Deputy Adjutant-General in India.
- Colonel Augustus Henry Turner, Indian Staff Corps, Colonel on the Staff in India.
- Colonel (Brigadier-General) George Frederick Young, Indian Staff Corps, Deputy Adjutant-General in India.
- Colonel Thomas Deane, Indian Staff Corps, Director Army Remount Department, India.
- Colonel Richard Wace, Inspector-General of Ordnance, Bengal.
- Lieutenant-Colonel and Brevet Colonel Francis Howard, the Rifle Brigade (the Prince Consort's Own), Aide-de-Camp to The Queen.
- Colonel (temporary Major-General) Thomas Francis Hobday, Indian Staff Corps Commissary-General-in-Chief in India.
- Lieutenant-Colonel and Brevet Colonel Charles Edward Swaine.
- Colonel John Steevens, Army Ordnance Department, Assistant Inspector-General of Ordnance, Headquarters.
- Lieutenant-Colonel and Brevet Colonel John Eyles Blundell.
- Lieutenant-Colonel and Brevet Colonel John Owen Kirk DSO, the Welsh Regiment.
- Brigade-Surgeon-Lieutenant-Colonel George William McNalty.
- Lieutenant-Colonel John Alexander Boyd, Army Service Corps, Deputy-Assistant Quartermaster-General, Headquarters.
- Veterinary-Lieutenant-Colonel (temporary Veterinary-Colonel) Francis Duck, Army Veterinary Department, Principal Veterinary Officer in India.
- Major and Brevet Lieutenant-Colonel Charles Berkeley Pigott DSO, 21st Lancers.
- Major and Brevet Lieutenant-Colonel Hector MacDonald DSO, the Royal Fusiliers (City of London Regiment), employed with the Egyptian Army.

Civil Division

- Sir William Macgregor KCMG, Governor, British New Guinea.
- Ernest James Lennox Berkeley, Commissioner and Consul-General, Protectorate of Uganda.
- Edward William Brabrook, Registrar of Friendly Societies.
- Reginald Brett, Secretary, Office of Works.
- James Joseph Cardin, Receiver and Accountant-General, General Post Office.
- Lieutenant-Colonel William Carington, Equerry to The Queen.
- William Christie, Astronomer Royal.
- William Augustus Ferguson Davie, Principal Clerk, Public Bill Office, House of Commons.
- Thomas Henry Elliott, Secretary to the Board of Agriculture.
- Vice-Admiral Edward Field.
- Harry Buxton Forman, Assistant Secretary, General Post Office.
- Vincent Griffiths, Treasury Valuer and Inspector of Rates.
- Thomas Wrigley Grimshaw, Registrar-General, Ireland.
- Edward Bernard Lewin Hill, Assistant Secretary, General Post Office.
- Maurice Holzmann, Secretary and Keeper of the Records, Duchy of Cornwall.
- Charles Augustus Hopwood, Assistant Clerk, Foreign Office.
- John Jackson, Chief Constable, Sheffield.
- Francis Broxholm Grey Jenkinson, Second Clerk Assistant, House of Commons.
- William Edward Knollys, Chief General Inspector and Assistant Secretary, Local Government Board.
- George Thomas Lambert, Director of Greenwich Hospital.
- Lieutenant-Colonel and Honorary Colonel Charles Philip Le Cornu, Jersey Artillery Militia.
- George Sutherland Mackenzie
- George Miller, Assistant Secretary, Education Department.
- Henry James Van Sittart Neale, Principal Clerk, Admiralty.
- William Davidson Niven, Director of Studies, Royal Naval College,
- David Nicolson
- Henry Robinson, Member of the Local Government Board, Ireland.
- Alfred Sharpe, Consul and Acting Commissioner, British Central Africa.
- Captain Walter James Stopford, Inspector-General Military Prison Department and Chairman of Prison Commission, Home Office.
- Charles Edward Troup, Principal Clerk, Home Office.
- Henry Francis Redhead Yorke, Director, Victualling Department, Admiralty.
- Chief Inspector of Machinery Alfred Wood, Royal Navy.
- Chief Inspector of Machinery James Wootton, Royal Navy.
- Commander Warren Frederick Caborne, Royal Naval Reserve.
- Lieutenant Anthony Standidge Thomson, Royal Naval Reserve.
- George Henry Stainer, late Civil Assistant to the Admiral Superintendent, Portsmouth Dockyard.
- Surgeon-Major-General James Jameson, Director-General, Army Medical Department.
- Colonel Edmond Bainbridge, Royal Artillery, Superintendent, Royal Laboratory, Woolwich.
- Colonel Charles Mills Moloney, Commissary-General of Ordnance.
- Honorary Colonel Thomas Palmer Senior, Chief Paymaster, Western District.
- Honorary Colonel Charles Gervais Boxall, 1st Sussex Volunteer Artillery.
- Charles Welby, Private Secretary to Secretary of State for War.
- Lieutenant-Colonel and Honorary Colonel Alan John Colquhoun, the Duke of Edinburgh's Own Edinburgh Artillery (Southern Division, Royal Artillery).
- Lieutenant-Colonel and Honorary Colonel Thomas Lloyd, the Cardigan Artillery (Western Division, Royal Artillery).
- Lieutenant-Colonel and Honorary Colonel Montague Charles Browning, 3rd Battalion the Suffolk Regiment.
- Lieutenant-Colonel and Honorary Colonel Alexander Caldcleugh Macleay, 3rd Battalion Seaforth Highlanders (Ross-shire Buffs, the Duke of Albany's).
- Colonel John Gerald Wilson, 3rd Battalion the York and Lancaster Regiment.
- Lieutenant-Colonel and Honorary Colonel Sir Thomas Charlton Meyrick. Bart., 3rd Battalion the King's (the Shropshire Light Infantry).
- Lieutenant-Colonel and Honorary Colonel Henry Platt, 4th Battalion the Royal Welsh Fusiliers.
- Lieutenant-Colonel and Honorary Colonel Maurice Charles Joseph Blake, 3rd Battalion the Connaught Rangers.
- Lieutenant-Colonel and Honorary Colonel Morgan George Lloyd, 3rd Battalion the Royal Irish Regiment.
- Lieutenant-Colonel and Honorary Colonel William Alexander Hill, 3rd Battalion the Gloucestershire Regiment.
- Lieutenant-Colonel and Honorary Colonel Thomas Warne Lemmon, 3rd Battalion the, East Surrey Regiment.
- Lieutenant-Colonel and Honorary Colonel John Andrew Macdonald, 3rd Battalion the Queen's Own Cameron Highlanders.
- Lieutenant-Colonel and Honorary Colonel Lewis Mansergh Buchanan, 4th Battalion the Royal Inniskilling Fusiliers.
- Lieutenant-Colonel and Honorary Colonel Sir Fitzroy Maclean Bt, the West Kent (Queen's Own) Yeomanry Cavalry.
- Lieutenant-Colonel Commandant and Honorary Colonel Thomas Wilson, 2nd Lancashire Volunteer Artillery.
- Lieutenant-Colonel and Colonel Henry Montague Hozier, 3rd Kent (Royal Arsenal) Volunteer Artillery.
- Lieutenant-Colonel and Honorary Colonel John Strick, 1st Shropshire and Staffordshire Volunteer Artillery.
- Lieutenant-Colonel and Honorary Colonel William Frederick Filter, the Tynemouth Volunteer Artillery (Western Division, Royal Artillery).
- Lieutenant-Colonel and Honorary Colonel Edmund Carter Plant, 2nd Gloucestershire (the Bristol) Royal Engineers (Volunteers).
- Lieutenant-Colonel and Honorary Colonel George Drew, 1st London Royal Engineers (Volunteers).
- Colonel William Earle Gascoigne Lytton Bulwer, Commanding the Norfolk Volunteer Infantry Brigade.
- Lieutenant-Colonel and Honorary Colonel Somers Reginald Lewis, 4th Middlesex (West London) Volunteer Rifle Corps.
- Lieutenant-Colonel and Honorary Colonel John Ormsby Vandeleur, 4th Volunteer Battalion the Hampshire Regiment.
- Lieutenant-Colonel and Honorary Colonel Samuel Smith Crosland Richards, 19th Middlesex (St. Giles' and St. George's, Bloomsbury) Volunteer Rifle Corps.
- Colonel Henry Bethune Patton, Commanding the Severn Volunteer Infantry Brigade.
- Lieutenant-Colonel and Honorary Colonel Arthur Maurice Blake, 1st (Hertfordshire) Volunteer Battalion the Bedfordshire Regiment.
- Lieutenant-Colonel and Honorary Colonel William Macfie, 3rd Volunteer Battalion the King's (Liverpool Regiment).

== Honours for cities and boroughs ==
The Queen has also been pleased to direct that the Chief Magistrates of the cities of Leeds and Sheffield shall in future bear the title of Lord Mayor.

Her Majesty has also been pleased to direct that the following boroughs shall be raised to the rank of cities :—

- Nottingham.
- Bradford.
- Kingston upon Hull.
