= John Dunne =

John Dunne may refer to:

== Religion ==
- John Dunne (priest) (1816–1867), Irish priest and educator
- John Dunne (bishop of Bathurst) (1845–1919), Roman Catholic bishop of Bathurst, New South Wales, Australia
- John Dunne (bishop of Wilcannia) (1846–1916), Roman Catholic bishop of Wilcannia, New South Wales, Australia
- John Charles Dunne (born 1937), American prelate of the Roman Catholic Church
- John S. Dunne (1929–2013), Roman Catholic priest and theologian
- John D. Dunne (born 1961), American author and professor of Buddhist Studies

== Sports ==
- John 'Tull' Dunne (1911–1990), Irish Gaelic footballer, coach and administrator
- John Dunne (basketball) (born 1970), American college basketball coach
- John Dunne, British rock climber featured in the film Hard Grit

== Other ==
- J. W. Dunne (1875–1949), British soldier, aeronautical engineer and philosopher
- John Gregory Dunne (1932–2003), American novelist, screenwriter
- John R. Dunne (1930–2020), American lawyer and politician
- John Dunne (chief constable) (1825–1906), chief constable of Cumberland and Westmorland

== See also ==
- John Donne (1572–1631), English metaphysical poet
- John Dunn (disambiguation)
