= University of North London =

University in England

Coordinates: 51.5518°N 0.1106°W

- Active: 1992–2002
- Affiliations: Coalition of Modern Universities
- Vice-Chancellor: Brian A. Roper
- Location: London Borough of Islington, United Kingdom
- Campus: 166–220 Holloway Road N7 8DB

The University of North London (UNL) was a university in London, England, formed from the Polytechnic of North London (PNL) in 1992 when that institution was granted university status. PNL, in turn, had been formed by the amalgamation of the Northern Polytechnic and North-Western Polytechnic in 1971. In 1996, the university celebrated its centenary, dating from the year of the Northern Polytechnic's founding. UNL existed until 2002, when it merged with London Guildhall University to form London Metropolitan University. Its former premises now form the university's north campus, on Holloway Road and Highbury Grove, Islington.

== Structure ==
Under the board of governors, the university was arranged into four faculties each led by a dean and pro vice-chancellor:—

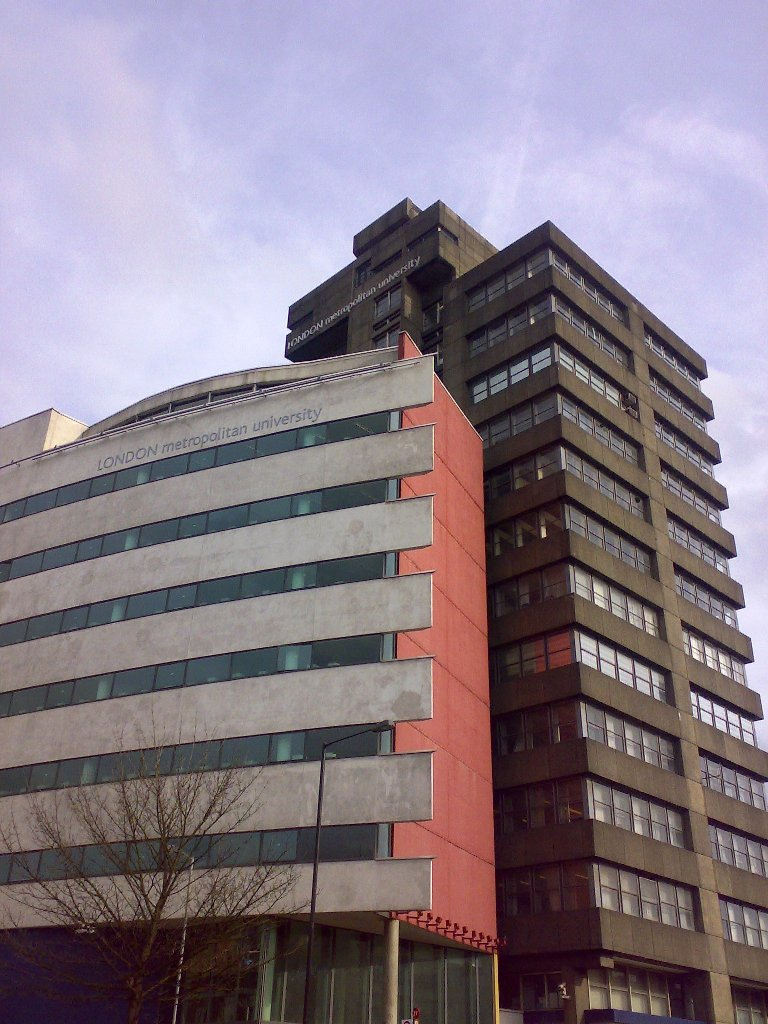
Tower Building, Holloway Road. Originally the Northern Polytechnic; the Technology Tower was added in 2000.

Faculty of Environmental and Social Studies

- School of Law, Governance and Information Management (formerly schools of Law and of Information and Communications Studies)
- School of Social Sciences (formerly Policy Studies, Politics and Social Research)
- School of Community Health, Psychology and Social Work (formerly schools of Health and of Social Work)
- School of Geography and Environmental Studies (until 1997)
- School of Architecture and Interior Design

Faculty of Humanities and Teacher Education

- School of Arts and Humanities (formerly Historical, Philosophical and Contemporary Studies)
- School of Area and Language Studies (formerly European and Language Studies)
- School of Education

Faculty of Science, Computing and Engineering

- School of Biological and Applied Sciences (formerly Applied Chemistry)
- School of Communications Technology and Mathematical Sciences (formerly schools of Electronic and Communications Engineering and Applied Physics and of Mathematical Studies)
- School of Informatics and Multimedia Technology (formerly Computing)
- School of Health and Sport Science (formerly Life Sciences)
- School of Polymer Technology (founded as the National College of Rubber Technology in 1948)

The Business School

Faculties organised undergraduate and postgraduate schemes within a university modular framework. An interdisciplinary undergraduate scheme for inter-faculty combined honours degrees was managed centrally by the Academic Registry.

=== Learning Centre ===
In 1994, the Learning Centre library opened on the site of a former mirror factory. In 1996, the Trades Union Congress library collections, which had been established in 1922, were transferred there. It is the major research library for the study of all aspects of trade unions, collective bargaining and labour history, with both historical and contemporary coverage.

=== The Rocket ===
The Great Hall was officially opened by the Lord Mayor of London in 1897, as a social and academic events space catering for dances and recitals. By 1929, a proscenium arch and stage were installed and it was renamed the Theatre, playing host to operas and theatrical productions. Throughout the 1980s, it was a solid fixture on the capital's gig circuit and an essential stop for touring bands. When electronic dance music and the club scene took hold at the turn of the decade, it was relaunched as the Rocket complex and became one of London's leading all-nighter venues.

The 1990s also saw the building divided vertically, creating its two separate floors. In 2015, the Great Hall had its name and grandeur restored, with the Rocket now referring exclusively to the ground floor café bar and adjacent courtyard garden.

=== Vice-chancellors ===
The vice-chancellor and chief executive was supported by the deputy vice-chancellor (academic) and the deputy vice-chancellor (research and development).

Name	Tenure	Note
Leslie Wagner	1992–1994	Director of the Polytechnic of North London from 1987
Brian A. Roper	1994–2002	Vice chancellor of London Metropolitan University to 2009

In 2000, the university awarded an honorary degree to Desmond Tutu, Archbishop of Cape Town and primate of the Anglican Church of Southern Africa, in a special ceremony.

Following the merger with London Guildhall (formerly the City of London Polytechnic), London Metropolitan became the largest unitary university in London.

== History ==
=== Northern Polytechnic Institute ===
Northern Polytechnic

The Northern Polytechnic opened in Holloway with aid from the City Parochial Foundation and substantial donations from the Worshipful Company of Clothworkers in 1896. Under the terms of its royal charter, its objective was "to promote the industrial skill, general knowledge, health and well-being of young men and women belonging to the poorer classes of Islington [and] to provide for the inhabitants of Islington and the neighbouring parts of north London, and especially for the Industrial Classes, the means of acquiring a sound General, Scientific, Technical and Commercial Education at small cost."

The founding principal of the institute was the chemist John Thomas Dunn. He appointed Victor Alessandro Mundella as its first professor of physics and head of the department of physics and electrical engineering.

By 1911, five-year University of London evening degrees were available. The modernist Cecil Stephenson was appointed head of art in 1923 and, from 1925, courses were recognised by the Royal Institute of British Architects.

==== NPI alumni ====
- Walter Hassan, automotive engineer and engine specialist for Bentley, Jaguar Cars and Coventry Climax
- Claire Rayner, journalist, broadcaster, novelist and nurse (Medicine)

=== North Western Polytechnic ===
North Western Polytechnic

The North Western Polytechnic was eventually opened by the Prince of Wales (later King Edward VIII) at Prince of Wales Road, Kentish Town in 1929. The polytechnic later acquired premises at St Pancras, Highbury (Ladbroke House) and 207–225 Essex Road. Concentrating on social sciences, humanities and arts, by 1967, when the printing department transferred to the London College of Printing (a founding member of the London Institute), the North-Western was the largest polytechnic in London.

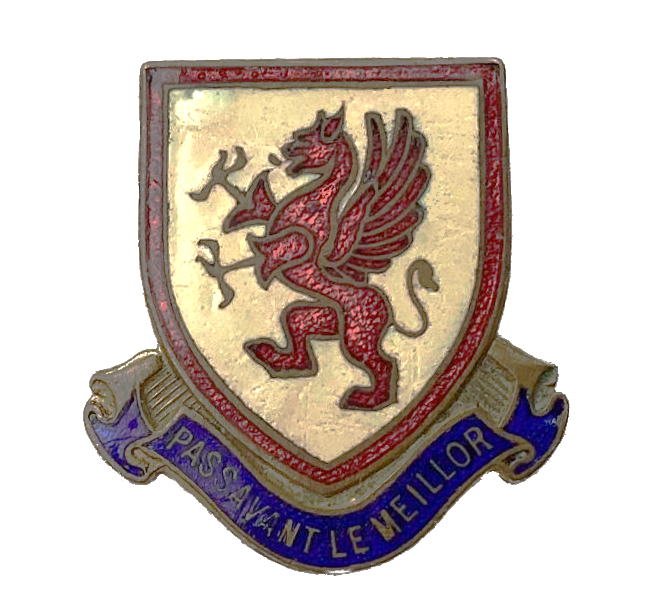
Pin Badge North Western Polytechnic London, made by Thomas Fattorini Ltd 1930

==== NWP alumni ====
- Alfred Hayes, professional wrestler under the name "Lord Alfred Hayes"
- Aminu Bashir Wali, Nigerian Minister of Foreign Affairs (2014–2015)
- Alison Weir, author and historian

=== Polytechnic of North London ===
Polytechnic of North London

The Polytechnic of North London was founded by the 1971 merger of the Northern and North-Western polytechnics. Its first director was Terence Miller, former principal of the University of Rhodesia. Until the passing of the Education Reform Act 1988, it came under the control of the Inner London Education Authority, part of the then Greater London Council. Degree awarding authority resided with the former Council for National Academic Awards until the polytechnic, a pioneer of widening participation and access to higher education, was granted university status in 1992.

After leaving Oxford in 1964, the renowned historian A. J. P. Taylor lectured at the polytechnic until his death in 1990.

==== The Harrington affair ====
In 1984, Patrick Harrington, a prominent member of the National Front and deputy editor of NF News, was the subject of protests by fellow students who picketed and boycotted his lectures, arguing that his presence made life intolerable for ethnic minority students. Disputing this, Harrington obtained an injunction which the protesters, backed by the students' union, ignored. At one stage the president of the National Union of Students, Phil Woolas, reported that the polytechnic was "simply not functioning any more," with lecturers defying the courts by refusing to give names of students on demonstrations. Two student leaders were sent to prison for 16 days for contempt of the court order preventing them from barring Harrington and the Secretary of State for Education, Sir Keith Joseph, threatened to close the polytechnic down.

In December, David MacDowall, then director, resigned after pressure from the Inner London Education Authority to make a complaint against Harrington for remarks he made in a radio interview. ILEA said the remarks were racist, which Harrington denied. In his resignation letter, MacDowall admitted that he had acted "in a totally fascistic manner" over the issue and wished "all the picketing students the best of luck with their campaign." Harrington subsequently faced a disciplinary hearing for a television interview in which, in line with NF policy, he questioned the right of black people to citizenship. In January 1985, with a new director, John Beishon, in post and final examinations approaching, the polytechnic, students' union and Harrington agreed a deal in which his classes would be taught separately in another building. He eventually graduated with a degree in philosophy. Beishon remained at PNL for three years.

==== PNL alumni ====
- Candy Atherton, journalist, former member of parliament for Falmouth and Camborne (Applied Social Sciences)
- Patrick Bergin, actor and singer (Education)
- Richard Cabut, writer, editor and cultural commentator (English Literature)
- Jeremy Corbyn, member of parliament for Islington North, former leader of the Labour Party (Trade Union Studies)
- Sir Sadiq Khan, Mayor of London, former member of parliament for Tooting (Law)
- Steve McFadden, actor (Economics)
- Jim Moir (commonly known as Vic Reeves), comedian and artist
- Matthew Sweeney, poet (German and English)
- Neil Tennant, singer-songwriter (History)
- Jamie Theakston, television presenter, producer, narrator and actor (Business Studies)
- Eamonn Walker, actor (Social Work)
- Tim Wright, video game music composer (Electronics and Communications Engineering)

=== University of North London ===
In 1992, under the Further and Higher Education Act, the Polytechnic of North London was granted university status to become the University of North London. It existed under that name until 2002, when it merged with London Guildhall University to form London Metropolitan University.

==== UNL alumni ====
- Noel Clarke, actor, screenwriter, director, comic book writer and recipient of the 2021 BAFTA Outstanding British Contribution to Cinema Award (presently suspended following allegations of misconduct) (Media Studies)
- Garth Crooks, football commentator and former professional player (Applied Social Sciences)

== In fiction ==
The 1997 Mike Leigh film Career Girls is about a reunion between two women who shared a flat six years earlier whilst studying at the Polytechnic of North London.

== See also ==
- New Universities
