= Victor Alessandro Mundella =

English physicist, author and teacher

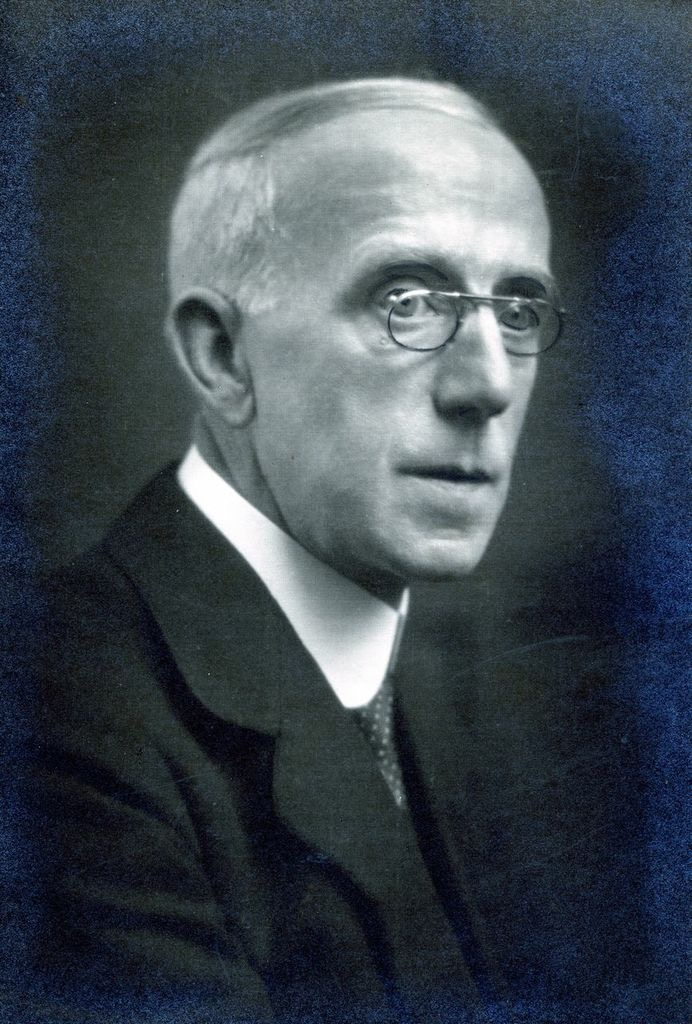
- Born: 4 December 1866; Nottingham, England
- Died: 4 March 1939 (aged 72); Sunderland, England
- Occupations: Professor of Physics; Principal of Sunderland Technical College
- Relatives: Rt Hon Anthony John Mundella PC (uncle); Emma Mundella (sister); Anthony John Mundella (brother); Dr JT Dunn (father-in-law)

Academic background
- Education: University College, Nottingham; College of Physical Science, Newcastle upon Tyne; St John's College, Cambridge

Academic work
- Discipline: Physicist

Victor Alessandro Mundella (3 December 1866 – 4 March 1939) was an English physicist, author and teacher. He was prominent in the field of Technical Education and was said to be among the leading educationalists of his time. He was Principal of the Technical College in Sunderland, England for 24 years.

== Early life and education ==
Victor Alessandro Mundella, known professionally as VA Mundella, was born in Nottingham, England, the seventh of a family of eight children. His father, John Mundella, was a hosiery manufacturer in the family firm of Hine & Mundella. He died when VA Mundella was six. His uncle was Anthony John Mundella, a Liberal statesman and a member of William Ewart Gladstone's Cabinet. His grandfather, Antonio Mondelli, was an immigrant of uncertain background from Monte Olimpino, near Como in Lombardy. Mundella was the only child in his family to be given an Italian name. His mother, Emma Wright, was the daughter of William Wright, a Nottingham lace, thread and silk commission agent. Mundella's upbringing was Unitarian and his family was politically Liberal with a strong leaning amongst his surviving siblings towards education and its reform.

Mundella's early education was at the non-sectarian school attached to the Unitarian High Pavement Chapel in Nottingham. From there he progressed to Nottingham High School and then University College Nottingham. He attended the College of Physical Science in Newcastle upon Tyne with the support of a Junior Pemberton Scholarship in 1885 and a Mather Scholarship in 1886. In 1887, he was awarded BSc with honours in Physics and appointed a Pemberton Fellow of the University of Durham in 1887, worth over £100 a year, which supported him while he was at St John's College, Cambridge from 1888 to 1891. He was awarded an Honours BA from Cambridge in 1891, and his MA in 1899.

== College of Physical Science, Newcastle upon Tyne ==
After Cambridge, Mundella served for five years as a lecturer in Physics at the College of Physical Science in Newcastle upon Tyne during which time he published Syllabus of a Course of Lectures on Heat.

== Northern Polytechnic Institute ==
In 1896, he was invited to take up the post of Professor of Physics and Head of the Department of Physics and Electrical Engineering at the then newly opened Northern Polytechnic Institute in Holloway, London under the Principalship of Dr JT Dunn. It opened its doors to students on 5 October 1896 with a mission "to promote the industrial skill, general knowledge, health and well-being of young men and women ...(and) ... the means of acquiring a sound General, Scientific, Technical and Commercial Education at small cost". In its first year, one thousand students enrolled and by 1900 the number of students had doubled.

In 1899, while at the Northern Polytechnic Institute, Mundella and JT Dunn together published a successful science textbook, General Elementary Science. It became the required textbook of Physics and Chemistry for London Matriculation and was also adopted by the Admiralty for teaching Elementary Science. The book ran to a number of editions and was still in print over ten years later.

== Sunderland Technical College ==
In 1908, Mundella left London to take up the post of Principal of the Technical College in Sunderland. Enjoying considerable support from local industry, the college had been founded in 1901. Mundella was its second Principal. The college was established to provide advanced instruction for the engineering, shipbuilding, mining and building industries on Wearside. When Mundella took over there were only four departments: Chemistry, Mechanical and Civil Engineering, Physics and Electrical Engineering (together with part-time lecturing in Commerce, Languages and Navigation. As a dynamic new enterprise, in 1903 Sunderland had become the first college in Britain to introduce sandwich courses which enabled local apprentices in engineering and naval architecture to spend six months in full attendance at the college, and six months in their places of employment over a period of three to four years.

Mundella was immediately able and eager to build on the foundations established by his predecessor, stressing the ideal of a liberal and comprehensive education for artisans. He was able to report in his first year that 25 local firms were taking advantage of the sandwich courses scheme and that he was supervising the extension of the Engineering Department to meet the requirements of the University of Durham Act 1908, as a prelude to affiliation with the University. The concept of educational progression was already in place by 1910, when Mundella ensured evening classes were re-structured to allow specialist study after two preliminary years.

By 1911, Mundella had consolidated the operation of college departments in Mathematics and Mechanics, Civil and Mechanical Engineering, Electrical Engineering, Pure and Applied Physics, Chemistry (including Engineering Chemistry), Botany, Building Trades and Naval Architecture. Advanced Modern Languages and Commerce were taught in evening classes.

Within three years of Mundella's arrival, the college's governors reported that "the standard of education reached by the picked band of engineering apprentices is equal, and in some respects is superior, to that of most colleges in this country".

In 1916, Mundella published a study of The Education of Youths Before and During Their Apprenticeship.

In a great surge of expansion under Mundella's aegis after World War I existing buildings were extended and new buildings were erected and the list of disciplines studied was increased to include, amongst others, Navigation and Latin. Most successfully, in 1921 he established a Pharmaceutical Department which resulted in the College being recognised geographically as the only institution between the long-established Universities of Leeds and Edinburgh with facilities for Pharmacy degree courses. The department, which began as a single bench in the Chemistry Department, soon grew to become the best-equipped, largest and most successful in the country. In 1930 the quality of the Pharmacy teaching was reflected by an affiliation to Durham University and to the London University Pharmacy BSc. Also in 1930, engineering students were able to prepare for University of Durham degrees in civil, marine, mechanical and electrical engineering.

Mundella was to remain as Principal of Sunderland Technical College for 24 years, being responsible for a sizeable increase in the number of students and the number of student hours. He had also overseen a notable improvement in the standard of technical education both at the college and in the region generally. He retired in May 1932.

== Other positions ==
In 1917, during World War I, Mundella was appointed by the Ministry of Reconstruction to a number of committees deliberating and advising on post-war improvements, with particular involvement in the sphere of technical education.

In 1920, he was one of the founders and a member until his retirement of the Northern Counties Technical Examinations Council, which, taking over from the Northern Union of Mechanics’ Institutes, had the ambition "to become a centre from whence the elements of knowledge and civilisation shall go on with an unceasing progress, conferring intellectual, scientific and moral blessings throughout the length and breadth of the Northern Counties". It was set up to provide examinations for technical colleges, schools and other centres.

Mundella was also on the Senate of Durham University for six years.

In 1920, he became Organiser of Technical Education for the whole of Sunderland, in which capacity he took the leading part in the planning and establishment of Sunderland's Junior Technical School, then a new venture in technical education. Mundella was also in charge of Sunderland's evening institutes.

He was a Fellow of the Physical Society of London, a Member of the Institution of Electrical Engineers and a prominent member of both the Association of Principals of Technical Institutions and the Institute of Teachers in Technical Institutions.

== Personal life ==
Mundella married Laura Dunn, the daughter of his Northern Polytechnic Institute colleague JT Dunn, in 1909. They had two children.

He was a practising Liberal Nonconformist, being a pacifist in his younger years (and as an independent adherent being present with Laura Dunn at the 17th Universal Peace Congress held in London in 1908) and later, with his wife, an active member of the League of Nations Union.

He was a pianist of note, and was said to be a finer player of the instrument than his elder sister Emma Mundella, who was a professional musician and composer, but he played only socially and for his own enjoyment.

Mundella died on 4 March 1939 of a coronary thrombosis after being ill for some time with chronic myocarditis. In a tribute, Sunderland's Director of Education declared that Mundella "was ranked among the leading educationists of his time. The sound lead he gave to technical education had many repercussions throughout the country".
