= Emma Mundella =

English composer (1858–1896)

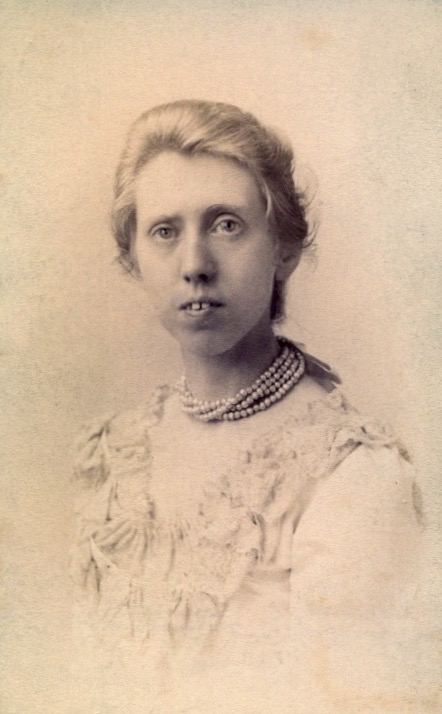
- Born: 30 April 1858; Nottingham, England
- Died: 20 February 1896 (aged 37); Marylebone, London
- Occupations: Composer, pianist, organist, conductor, music teacher and editor
- Known for: The Day School Hymnbook
- Relatives: Rt Hon Anthony John Mundella PC (uncle); Anthony Mundella (brother); Victor Mundella (brother)

Emma Wright Mundella (30 April 1858 – 20 February 1896) was an English composer and arranger, recital pianist, church organist, choral conductor, teacher of music and hymnal editor. In her short life she published anthems, choruses and cantatas as well as songs, hymns, pieces for solo piano and for piano and other string instruments. As Director of Music Teaching at Wimbledon High School for Girls her particular interest was the encouragement of musical appreciation by young people, in pursuit of which she wrote many compositions for children and schools. Though her music is now seldom heard, her lasting achievement was her well-regarded editorship of The Day School Hymnbook, the expanded edition of which was published shortly after her early death and which brought her posthumously into national prominence.

== Early life and education ==
Emma Mundella was born in Nottingham, England, the first of a family of eight children. Her father, John Mundella, was a hosiery manufacturer in the family firm of Hine & Mundella. He died when she was 15. Her uncle was Anthony John Mundella, a Liberal statesman and a member of William Ewart Gladstone's Cabinet. Her grandfather, Antonio Mondelli, was an immigrant of uncertain background from Monte Olimpino, near Como in Lombardy. Her mother, Emma Wright, was the daughter of William Wright, a Nottingham lace, thread and silk commission agent. Her upbringing was Unitarian and her family was politically Liberal with a strong leaning amongst her surviving siblings towards education and its reform.

Emma Mundella's general education was at the non-sectarian school attached to the Unitarian High Pavement Chapel in Nottingham. She developed an early enthusiasm and talent for music, which was encouraged by studying it and by learning to play the piano. Initially, she was taught by her mother, but later she became a pupil of the organist of St Mary's Church, Nottingham, Arthur Page, who taught her the piano and harmony.

== Training in music ==
At the age of 18 she won a Corporation of Nottingham scholarship, worth £40 a year, at the new National Training School for Music (which later became the Royal College of Music) neighbouring the Royal Albert Hall in London. The School opened to students as she arrived, on 17 May 1876. She was among 50 or so young people who had gained the first scholarships.

The School's Principal was the composer Sir Arthur Sullivan. He tutored Emma Mundella, as did his colleagues, the pianist and composer Ernst Pauer, the composer Sir John Stainer, the musical theorist Ebenezer Prout, the organist and composer Frederick Bridge and others. As well as the piano she studied organ-playing, harmony, counterpoint, composition and singing. When the School evolved into the Royal College of Music in 1883 she was one of the first former students to secure the diploma qualification Associate of the Royal College of Music (ARCM).

== Teacher ==
Her ambition, as well as to compose, was to teach music, and on leaving college she sought work in schools. Her first post, in 1879, was Director of Music at St Elphin's Clergy Daughters' School in Warrington, Cheshire. There she superintended piano and harmony lessons and took classes in choral singing.

After a year, in November 1880, she was invited to take the post of Director of Music Teaching at the newly opened Wimbledon High School for Girls. It was a successful appointment and as a result the school won and maintained a high musical reputation. She remained at Wimbledon for 16 years, until her death in 1896. At the school, as well as the regular supervision of the musical curriculum, she inaugurated lectures on musical subjects, organised recitals and started a musical circle of past and present pupils for the encouragement of composition and vocal and instrumental performances. She also composed music for the girls to perform.

She was held in great affection by many of her former pupils and friendships were maintained long after they had left the school. Katharine Ramsay, later Katharine Stewart-Murray, Duchess of Atholl (1874-1960), a pupil at Wimbledon, wrote in her autobiography that “In music I had a teacher who I do not believe had her equal throughout the country, Miss Emma Mundella”, and praised her vigilant attention.

== Performer ==
As well as her school activities, Emma Mundella was a piano recitalist; amongst her recitals was a concert presented in the autumn of 1884 which was devoted solely to her performance of a number of the piano works of Edvard Grieg and which provided evidence of her musical abilities and her stamina. She also carried out duties as an organist at a London church, taught a large number of private pupils, delivered popular lectures on the great musical composers and gathered together a women’s choir which she conducted. She maintained many friendships in the musical world, leading composers and musicians of the day among them, and was not daunted in approaching some of the most prominent figures in that world for help and advice. Evidence exists in the Edvard Grieg archives that she wrote to him prior to her 1884 recital to seek assistance on the tempo of the Norwegischer Brautzug (the Norwegian Bridal Procession), asking him the speed at which he intended it should be played. She was a prodigious attender of concerts, and her name appeared regularly as one of the guarantors of the Philharmonic Society (later the Royal Philharmonic Society) seasons of concerts at St James’s Hall and later the Queen’s Hall.

== Composer ==
As a composer as well as a teacher Emma Mundella found that there was a lack of suitable progressive music for young students and she did her best to help fill this gap. Over 15 years, from 1881, she composed many pieces of music specifically for young people, including cantatas, anthems, hymns, sacred songs, children's songs, and other choral pieces. An example of her work for young people is Through Wisdom Is An House Builded, an anthem written for the opening of a new school building at Wimbledon which was sung by the school choir and conducted by Emma Mundella at the opening ceremony. She also wrote elementary piano duets for teacher and pupil, and sketches for the piano. Many other compositions were written for adult use, including choral works (both sacred and secular, including an oratorio, The Victory of Song, 1891), songs, pieces for the solo piano, and instrumental trios and quartets. Her choral works and songs were invariably written for the female voice. Her publishers were primarily Novello, Ewer and Company (later Novello and Company). At least until the end of the Second World War (her copyright expired in 1946) a number of her works, including particularly a setting of William Shakespeare's Ye Spotted Snakes and an instrumental trio, continued to sell and be performed publicly.

== “The Day School Hymnbook” ==
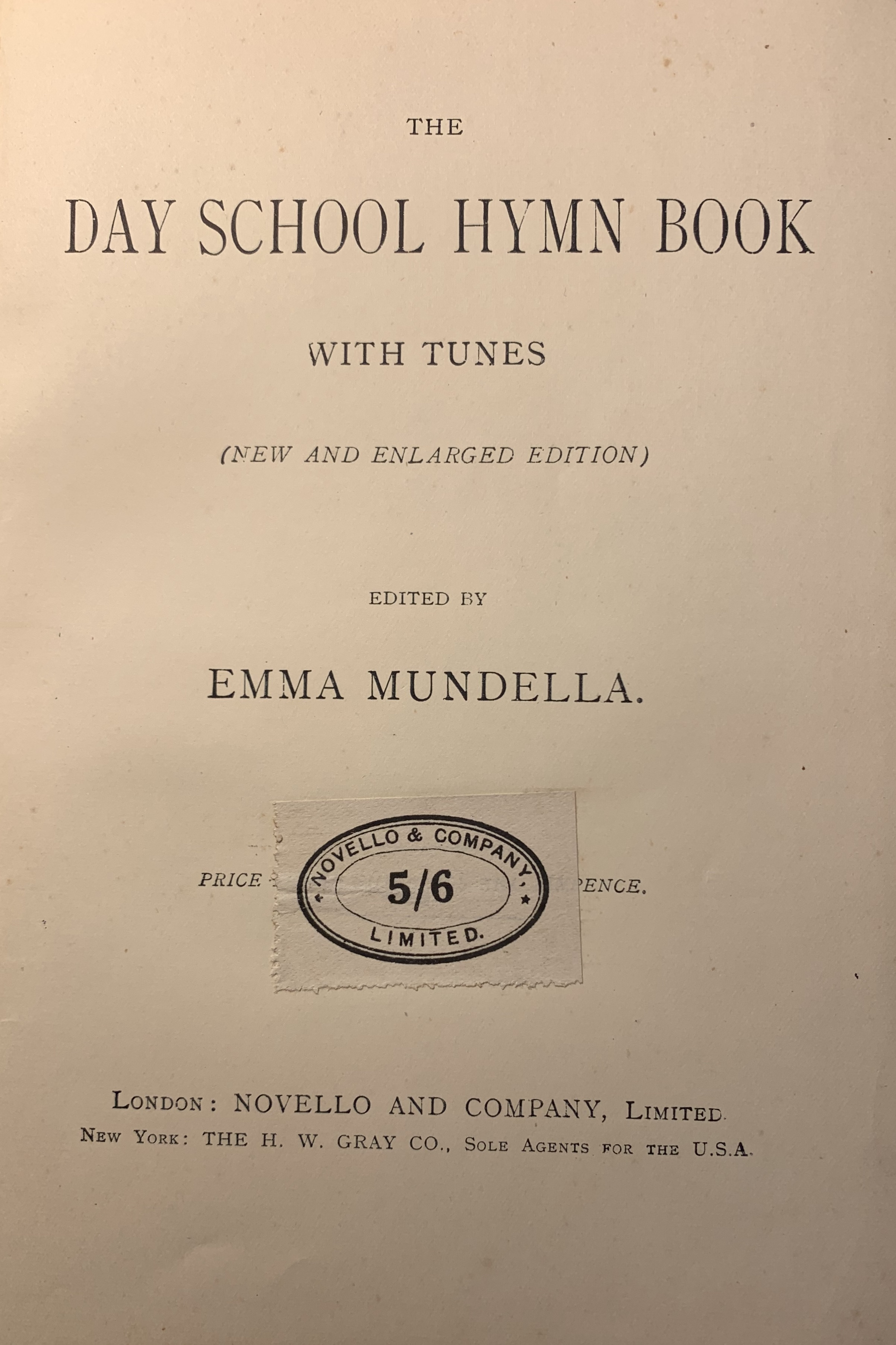
The title page of The Day School Hymnbook

Emma Mundella’s most important work, however, by which she will be remembered, is The Day School Hymnbook (Novello and Company, London, 1890). The first edition, published in 1890, contained 83 hymns. The Musical Times reported that it was remarkably well-received and reviewed and proved her to have the sort of skill in selecting words and music which would win the hearts of the young. Novello and Company requested her to enlarge the scope of her work and make the second issue much more comprehensive.

The second edition (Novello and Company, London, 1896), published after her death, in 1896, was, like the first, non-denominational and international in character. It included about 100 further hymns, some with their French, German and Latin words. She wrote new music for 15 existing hymns and invited some of her composer friends, such as John Stainer, Hubert Parry and Frederick Bridge, to contribute. She also included her arrangements of music by composers such as Robert Schumann and Franz Schubert. In its review of this second edition The Musical Times commented:

The wide reading and the musical knowledge it displays are remarkable; here are old German, French, and English tunes, and many too-much neglected tunes of the English middle period ... the special contributions of living composers show how many of her friends took a sincere interest in the success of the work ... Among the many tunes which here appear for the first time, some of the most remarkable are from her pen.

The Day School Hymnbook is still available in digital reprints.

== Personal life and early death ==
Little is known of Emma Mundella’s personal life outside her musical passions and her friendships within the musical community and with her former pupils. She remained single, sharing rooms in Bloomsbury, London with her unmarried younger brother, the Manchester Guardian journalist and education reformer, Anthony John Mundella (Junior). She died in Marylebone, London on 20 February 1896 following a bowel obstruction which led to sepsis, and heart failure. She was buried in the Mundella/Wright family vault in the Nottingham General Cemetery.

Emma Mundella’s friend, the composer Sir John Stainer, wrote in her obituary:

The secret of her extraordinary success and influence lay in the fact that she loved always to do her best because work was to her a privilege as well as a pleasure, and also because she did not teach others from the height of a professional pedestal; she was down amongst their hearts with a loving penetrating sympathy.

== List of works ==
This preliminary listing by date-of-publication of compositions by Emma Mundella requires further research. All her works are now out of print. Copies of a majority of the works listed are held by the heirs of the Emma Mundella estate. Copies of many of the works are also held by the British Library in London and the Bodleian Library in Oxford.

- The Holidays - A "breaking-up" Song. Words by Emma Mundella, Novello, Ewer & Co, London, 1881.
- Blessed be the Lord God - A Christmas Anthem. Words from the Gospel of Luke I:68-70, Weekes & Co, London, 1883.
- Autumn, song. Words by HG Adams from A Story of the Seasons, Weekes & Co, London, 1883.
- Twelve Children's Songs for Elementary Classes: The Cloud Messengers, Dance and Song, Fairy-Land, Fire Stories, The Flower Girls, Marching, Play-time, The Sea Dream, The Snow Queen, The Swing Song, The Winds, The World. Words by Emma Mundella, J Curwen & Sons Ltd, London, 1886.
- Flowers, canon for two voices. Words by Percie, Novello, Ewer & Co, London & New York, 1886.
- Ye Spotted Snakes, two-part song. Words by William Shakespeare from A Midsummer Night's Dream, Novello, Ewer & Co, London & New York, 1886.
- Our God is Lord of the Harvest, anthem for Harvest with verse for school children. Words not credited (Emma Mundella?), Novello, Ewer & Co, London & New York, 1886.
- Song of the Mermaids and Mermen, two-part song. Words by Sir Walter Scott from The Pirate, Novello & Co, London and HW Gray & Co, Ndew York, 1886.
- The Mad Lover's Song, song. Words by Thomas John Dibdin, Stanley Lucas, Weber & Co, London, 1886.
- Through Wisdom is an House Builded, two-part anthem for treble and alto voices. Words from the Book of Proverbs 24:3, King James Bible, Novello, Ewer & Co, London & New York, 1887.
- Andante and allegro con brio, for three sets of violins and pianoforte. Novello, Ewer & Co, 1888.
- March and chorus from Wagner's Tannhäuser. Arranged for piano solo and chorus of female voices, Novello & Co, London, 1890.
- Twelve Elementary Duets. Novello, Ewer & Co, London, 1890.
- The Victory of Song, chorus for female voices, violins, harp and pianoforte. Words by Lewis Morris, Novello, Ewer & Co, London & New York, 1891.
- Autumn Leaves, cantata for female voices. Words by JM Scott Moncrieff, Joseph Williams, London and Edward Schubert & Co, New York, 1892.
- What the Birds Said, two-part song. Words by G Macdonald, Novello & Co, London & New York, 1893.
- Up and Down, two-part song. Words by MacNaught, Novello & Co, London & New York, 1893.
- Praise, O Praise our God and King. Novello & Co, London & New York, 1894.
- Untitled, written on All Saints' Day, 1895, thought to be a hymn tune. Published privately as part of Emma Mundella's In Memoriam card, 1896.
- Antigone, musical, performed by Wimbledon High School girls, 1896. Not published.
- Dreamland, choral piece, performed in competition by a Women's Institute choir, 1896. Not published.
- Simplicitas, hymn tune. In the Day School Hymn Book, 2nd edition, Novello & Co, London & New York, 1896.
- St Mary, Kilvington, hymn tune. In the Day School Hymn Book, 2nd edition, Novello & Co, London & New York, 1896.
- Ex Humilibus Excelsa, hymn tune. In the Day School Hymn Book, 2nd edition, Novello & Co, London & New York, 1896.
- Hengwrt, hymn tune. In the Day School Hymn Book, 2nd edition, Novello & Co, London & New York, 1896.
- Carrington, hymn tune. In the Day School Hymn Book, 2nd edition, Novello & Co, London & New York, 1896.
- St Catharine, hymn tune. In the Day School Hymn Book, 2nd edition, Novello & Co, London & New York, 1896.
- St John, hymn tune. In the Day School Hymn Book, 2nd edition, Novello & Co, London & New York, 1896.
- Nottingham, hymn tune. In the Day School Hymn Book, 2nd edition, Novello & Co, London & New York, 1896.
- Étoile du Matin, hymn tune. In the Day School Hymn Book, 2nd edition, Novello & Co, London & New York, 1896.
- Prière du Soir, hymn tune. In the Day School Hymn Book, 2nd edition, Novello & Co, London & New York, 1896
- Confiance en Dieu, hymn tune. In the Day School Hymn Book, 2nd edition, Novello & Co, London & New York, 1896
- Consécration, hymn tune. In the Day School Hymn Book, 2nd edition, Novello & Co, London & New York, 1896.
- Glorification, hymn tune. In the Day School Hymn Book, 2nd edition, Novello & Co, London & New York, 1896.
- Three School Graces, unaccompanied score. In the Day School Hymn Book, 2nd edition, Novello & Co, London & New York, 1896.
- The Desert, carol. Words by Shapcott Wensley, published in Twelve New Carols for Christmas, Novello & Co, London & New York, 1899.
- Journeying, song. Published in Harmonic Primer by Frederic Herbert Ridley and Thomas Tapper, American Book Company, New York, 1903.
- A River Song, song. Published in Harmonic Primer by Frederic Herbert Ridley and Thomas Tapper, American Book Company, New York, 1903.
- Three Sketches for the Pianoforte. Augener & Co, London, no date.
