= William Adamson (businessman) =

British businessman (1832-1917

Sir William Adamson CMG
- Born: 1832
- Died: 11 March 1917 (aged 85)
- Occupation: Businessman

Sir William Adamson CMG (1832 – 11 March 1917) was a British businessman and member of the Legislative Council in Singapore.

== Early life ==
Born in 1832, Adamson was the son of Ebenezer Adamson of Glasgow.

== Career ==
In the early 1850s, Adamson went to China, and before 1857 went to Singapore to work as a clerk in McEwan and Co. When the firm was dissolved, he joined the newly formed Borneo Company, opened a branch in Bangkok, and by 1862 was a manager of the company.

During February, 1862 he introduced Anna Leonowens to the King of Siam to be a governess to the royal children. In 1863, he went into partnership as merchant traders with Samuel Gilfillan who was a colleague at McEwan and Co, and they established the firms Gilfillan, Adamson and Associates in Singapore, and Adamson Gifillan and Co in London. They exported produce from Southeast Asia which they shipped from Singapore to Britain, and in return imported manufactured goods and textiles from Britain. In 1904, the firms were merged and incorporated as Adamson Gilfillan & Co, and Adamson became chairman of the company.

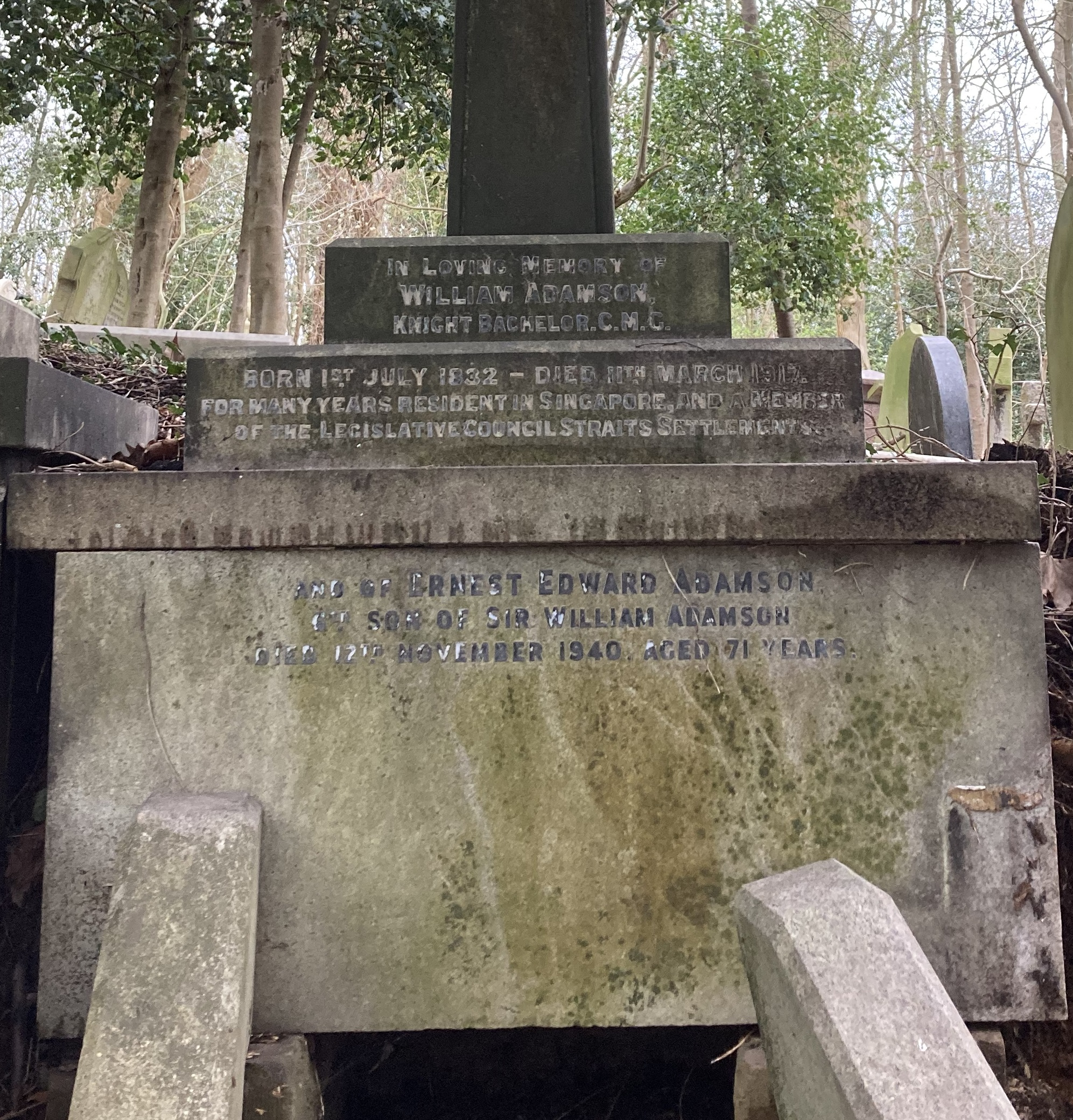
Family vault of Sir William Adamson in Highgate Cemetery

During his career of over 30 years spent in Singapore, he became a leading figure in the business community and served as an unofficial member of the Legislative Council of the Straits Settlements having been first appointed in 1869. He served as chairman of the Chamber of Commerce, chairman of the Straits Settlements Association, chairman of the Raffles Library and Museum, and was a member of the Currency Commission and the Police Commission. For many years, he was a director of the P. & O. Company. From 1910, he became associated with the rubber industry in Malaya, establishing Lamut Rubber Estates Limited, and acted as agents for Goodrich Rubber Co.

Adamson died in England on 11 March 1917, aged 85 and was buried in a family vault at Highgate Cemetery.

== Personal life ==
Adamson married Margaret Hamilton in 1859. One of his sons was the artist John Adamson RA.

== Honours ==
Adamson was appointed Companion of the Order of St Michael and St George (CMG) in the 1897 Birthday Honours. He received a knighthood in the 1907 Birthday Honours.
