= John Woodham Dunn =

Rev. J W (John Woodham) Dunn (1812-1883) was an Anglican vicar of Warkworth in Northumberland

== Lifetime ==
The Rev. John Woodham Dunn M.A. was born 17 September 1812. He married Sarah Emily Yarker, the daughter of Rev Luke Yarker JP and Mrs Mary Beata Yarker (née South) on 19 September 1845. (Sarah was born in Stanhope, County Durham in 1821 and died on 2 March 1931). They had a son Hugh Percy Dunn, born 24 August 1854 at Warkworth, Northumberland, England and died 2 March 1931.

Dunn gained his BA at Queens' College, Cambridge and was appointed curate of Longhoughton and of Lesbury, and successively vicar of Matterdale and Dalton. In 1853 he became vicar of The Church of St Lawrence, Warkworth. He was awarded an MA in 1866. He died 18 September 1883.

The Church of St Lawrence, Warkworth, was the mother church for many local villages including Amble and during his time here as vicar, he campaigned for many years for Amble’s independence. Eventually, in February 1869 an Order in Council designated the town “a separate district for spiritual purposes”. (In October 1870 a small stone church, dedicated to St. Cuthbert of Lindisfarne and with room for approximately 350 souls, was built).

== Writings ==
Although not a prolific author, he wrote several articles, which included :-

An introductory chapter on “The Castle and Hermitage” which appeared (on pages 42 to 57) in “The Hermit of Warkworth - a Northumberland Ballad in Three Fits”, by Thomas Percy and was described on the cover as “With an introductory chapter upon the castle and Hermitage by the Rev. J. W. Dunn”

A chapter (of 11 pages) “Notices of the ancient vill of Warkworth by John Woodham Dunn” which appeared in “The Berwickshire Naturalists' Club” Volume V in 1863.

An article entitled “Ancient Sepulchral Remains at Amble (with Illustration). By the Rev. J. W. Dunn” appeared on pages 38 & 39 of “Archaeologia aeliana UK Relating to antiquity – volume III (1859).

An article entitled “Warkworth Chancel (with illustrations.)” Rev. J. W. Dunn” appeared on pages 62 of “Archaeologia aeliana UK Relating to antiquity – volume VI (1865).

== See also ==
- Geordie dialect words
