= Johnny Dunn (footballer) =

Australian rules footballer

Personal information
- Full name: John Dunn
- Born: 14 June 1878; Rutherglen, Victoria
- Died: 30 June 1963 (aged 85); Corowa, New South Wales
- Original team: Border United (Corowa)
- Height: 180 cm (5 ft 11 in)
- Weight: 81 kg (179 lb)

Playing career^{1}
Years	Club	Games (Goals)
1903	Collingwood	3 (0)
- ^{1} Playing statistics correct to the end of 1903.

John Dunn (14 June 1878 – 30 June 1963) was an Australian rules footballer who played with Collingwood in the Victorian Football League (VFL).
