= James Donnet =

British Royal Navy surgeon

Sir James Donnet
- Born: James John Louis Donnet; 1816; Gibraltar
- Died: 11 January 1905 (aged 88–89); Bognor, England
- Military career
- Allegiance: United Kingdom
- Branch: Royal Navy
- Rank: Inspector-General of Fleets and Hospitals
- Awards: Knight Commander of the Order of the Bath

Inspector-General of Hospitals and Fleets Sir James John Louis Donnet KCB (1816 – 11 January 1905) was a British Royal Navy surgeon. His work on yellow fever was the foundation of modern medical practice in dealing with this disease.

Donnet was born in Gibraltar in 1816 the son of Henry Donnet, a Royal Navy surgeon, and Elizabeth Moore. He was educated in Edinburgh, London, at the University of Paris and at Anderson College, Glasgow. He joined the Royal Navy as an assistant surgeon in 1840 on HMS Benbow. He was sent to the Mediterranean during the Oriental Crisis of 1840 aboard HMS Vesuvius and after the capture of Acre he was placed in charge of a temporary shore hospital.

By 1849, Donnet had been promoted to Surgeon and aboard HMS Calypso he was in the West Indies during an outbreak of yellow fever. Between 1850 and 1851 he was surgeon on HMS Assistance on a voyage to the Arctic under Sir Erasmus Ommanney. In 1854 was on HMS President in the Pacific Ocean.

Between 1866 and 1867, was staff surgeon at the Port Royal Hospital in Jamaica where he studied yellow fever, and his study was published in the Health Report in 1867 and he later published Notes on Yellow Fever. In May 1867 he was promoted to deputy inspector-general and in 1870 he was appointed an honorary surgeon to Queen Victoria.

In 1873, he was in-charge of the medical wards of the Royal Navy Hospital Haslar hospital in Gosport which had an outbreak of smallpox and enteric fever and was also looking after cases of fever and dysentery following the Third Anglo-Ashanti war. Promoted to Inspector-General in 1875 and was awarded a good-service pension in 1878. In the 1897 Diamond Jubilee Honours he was appointed a Knight Commander of the Order of the Bath. He retired to Bognor and died at home on 11 January 1905.

== Family life ==
In 1852, Donnet married Eliza Meyer. The 1881 census shows that they had one daughter, Adelaide Mary Donnet, born in Portugal in or about 1862. They also had a son, James John Connor Donnet, who served as a doctor in the RAMC, in India 1890–1914.
