= John Dunne (police officer) =

Sir John Dunne (1825 – 5 January 1906) was the Chief Constable of Cumberland and Westmorland Constabulary for 45 years.

== Early life and family ==
John Dunne was born in Ireland in 1825.

In October 1868 at All Souls Church, Langham Place, London, he had married Mary Barnes, daughter of Thomas Barnes MD of Bunker's Hill, Cumberland, and Tring Park, Hertfordshire.

== Career ==
Dunne joined the newly formed Manchester Borough police force in 1839. Within three years he transferred to Chelmsford Constabulary and in 1846 was promoted to Inspector. After a further three years in Bath and two in Kent as a Superintending Officer, he became the Chief Officer of the Norwich City Police in 1851.

After a short spell in Newcastle, he was appointed Chief Constable in January, 1857 of the new joint constabulary of Cumberland and Westmorland, where he controlled a force of 74 officers to police a population of some 200,000 spread over a large area. He served as Chief Constable until 1902.

He was knighted in the 1897 Diamond Jubilee Honours.

== Death ==
Dunne died in 1906 at his home, Eden Mount, in Wetheral, Cumbria.
