= John Dunn (explorer) =

Canadian explorer

John Dunn (born 1954) is a wilderness explorer, writer and photographer, originally from England, but now based in Calgary, Alberta, Canada. He has completed a number of pioneering expeditions throughout northern Canada and the Canadian Arctic. He writes for Canadian Geographic and National Geographic magazines and conducts illustrated talks worldwide. He holds a degree in geology and worked for a time in the Australian outback before moving to explore the Canadian Arctic.

== Expeditions ==
Dunn has completed a number of expeditions during his career. Many of them have been pioneering, being the first recorded human-powered traverses of remote areas.

=== Ellesmere Island, 1990 ===
In 1990, Dunn led a four-man team on the first human-powered traverse of Canada's Ellesmere Island. The 96-day, 1,250 kilometres (777 mi) journey was conducted on skis with the team pulling sleds containing supplies and photography equipment.

=== Baffin Island, 1994 ===
In 1994, Dunn and his team completed the first human-powered crossing of Baffin Island, the fifth largest island in the world. The 3,030 kilometres (1,883 mi) journey was completed in 192 days during the northern summer.

=== British Columbia, 1997 ===
In 1997, Dunn completed a 2,500 kilometres (1,553 mi) journey from Tofino on Vancouver Island to Fort Nelson in northeastern British Columbia. This journey started with a solo kayak up the west coast of Vancouver Island, then became a canoe trip up the Inside Passage, and finished with a 54-day hike across the Canadian Cordillera where Dunn was accompanied by biologist Bob Saunders. They carried an inflatable canoe to aid them on particular sections of the journey. Each lost around 14 kilograms (31 lb) in the process. The article describing the journey received an Honourable Mention in the photojournalism category at the 22nd Annual National Magazine Awards.
