= Jack Dunne (footballer) =

Irish footballer (1890-1974)

Personal information
- Full name: John Dunne
- Date of birth: 1890
- Place of birth: Donnybrook, Dublin, Ireland
- Date of death: 1974 (aged 83–84)
- Position: Full back

Senior career*
| Years | Team | Apps | (Gls) |
| – | Shelbourne | | |
| 1914–1918 | Lincoln City | 23 | (0) |
| – | Mid Rhondda | | |
| – | Boston Town | | |
| – | Horncastle Town | | |
- * Club domestic league appearances and goals

John "Jack" Dunne (1890–1974) was an Irish footballer who made 23 appearances in the Football League playing for Lincoln City as a full back. Before joining Lincoln, he played in the Irish Football League for Shelbourne, was a member of their 1911 IFA Cup-winning team, and was capped once for the Irish League representative team, in November 1913 against the Scottish League XI. He went on to play for Southern League club Mid Rhondda and for Boston Town and Horncastle Town.
