= John Thomas Dunn (chemist) =

19th and 20th-century analytical chemist and academic

J T Dunn
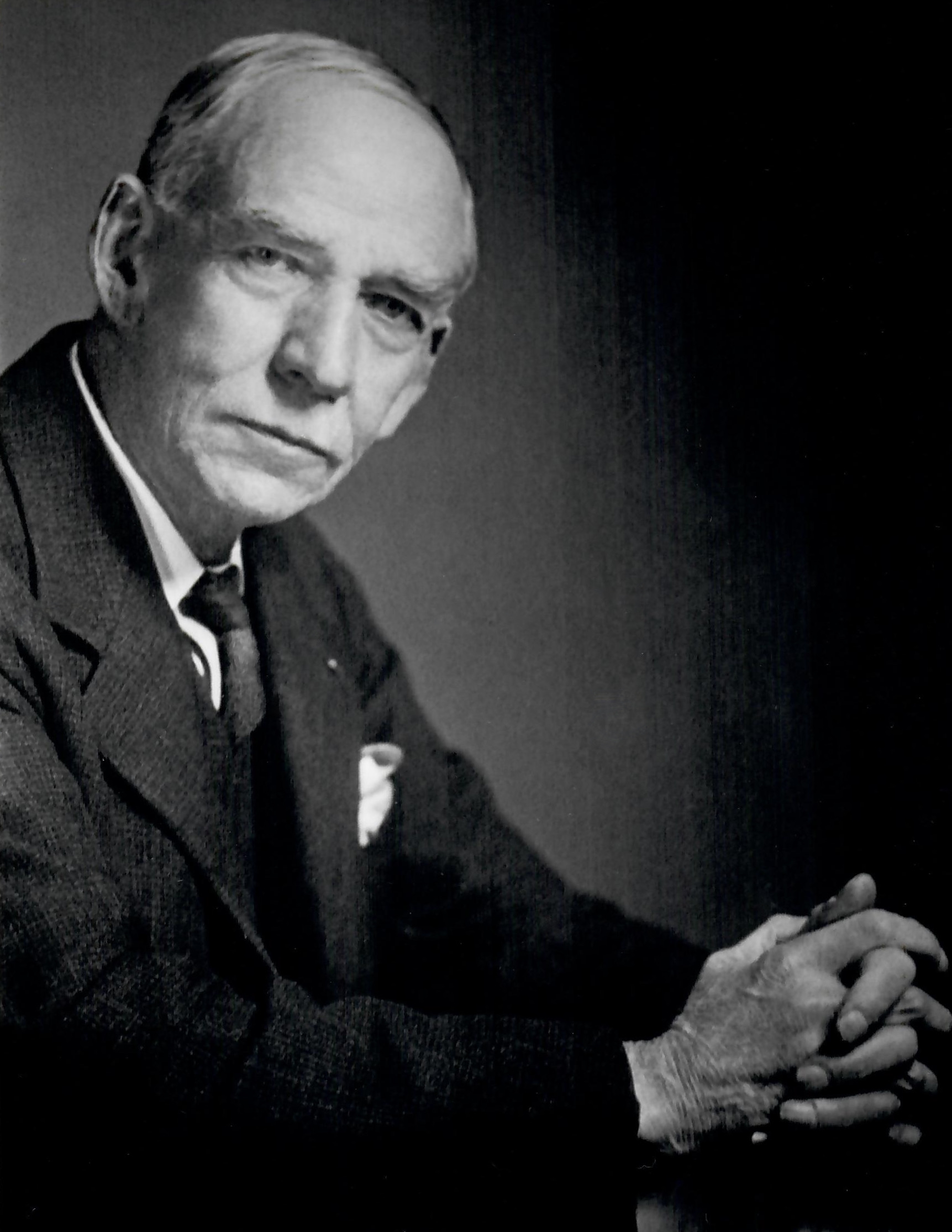
- Born: John Thomas Dunn; 19 April 1858; Newcastle upon Tyne, England
- Died: 3 January 1939 (aged 80); Newcastle upon Tyne, England
- Education: College of Physical Science, Durham University, Newcastle upon Tyne
- Known for: Durham University's first Doctor of Science Founding Principal, Northern Polytechnic Institute, London President, Royal Society of Chemistry 'The Father of Tyneside chemistry' (Obituary)
- Scientific career
- Fields: Analytical chemistry
- Institutions: Durham University Northern Polytechnic Institute, London J and H S Pattinson, Newcastle upon Tyne

John Thomas Dunn (19 April 1858 – 3 January 1939) was an English analytical chemist. He was also a teacher and author. He became President of the Royal Society of Chemistry and received the highest honours his scientific colleagues could bestow.

He was Durham University's first Master of Science and subsequently became its first Doctor of Science. He was the founding principal of the Northern Polytechnic Institute in London. He later practised as an analytical and consulting chemist in North East England and was the public analyst for Newcastle upon Tyne, for the county of Northumberland and for several of the major industrial towns of the North East. He was a hereditary freeman of Newcastle upon Tyne. On his death he was described as "the Father of Tyneside Chemistry".

== Early life and education ==
Dunn was born in Newcastle upon Tyne in 1858 to Thomas Dunn, a Newcastle ironmonger and auctioneer and his wife Ann Chicken, the daughter of a labourer at William Armstrong's Newcastle factory. He attended the Percy Street Academy in Newcastle, popularly known as Dr Bruce's School, from about the age of 8. He left school at the age of 13 to work as a clerk for his father and then as a railway booking clerk. In 1874, at the age of 16, Dunn became a student at the three-year-old College of Physical Science in Newcastle, which was then part of the University of Durham, and is now part of Newcastle University.

Specialising in chemistry, at the early age of 19 he became a Bachelor of Science, one of the university's first. In 1881 he became Durham's first Master of Science, and in 1888 he became the university's first Doctor of Science.

== Early career ==
In 1877 Dunn became a demonstrator in chemistry at the College of Physical Science. He was then made the college's Professor of Chemistry in 1882 at the young age of 24.

In 1884 he was appointed science teacher at the newly opened private Gateshead High School for Boys. Three years later he became the school's head teacher. While still holding that position he became Inspector of Science Schools and Classes for Durham County Council.

In 1894 Dunn was appointed head of the new Technical College in Plymouth, more properly known as the Jubilee Memorial Science, Art and Technical School, where he remained for only one year.

== Northern Polytechnic Institute ==
Dunn was appointed the founding Principal of the Northern Polytechnic Institute in Holloway, London, and head of its Chemistry Department, in 1895. The institute was opened with aid from the City of London Parochial Foundation and substantial donations from the Worshipful Company of Clothworkers. Under the terms of its royal charter its objective was:

"to promote the industrial skill, general knowledge, health, and wellbeing of young men and women belonging to the poorer classes of Islington and to provide for the inhabitants of Islington and the neighbouring parts of North London, and especially for the Industrial Classes, the means of acquiring a sound General, Scientific, Technical, and Commercial Education at small cost."

Dunn's task in his first year – as founding Principal of the institute (which has since become the main campus of the London Metropolitan University) – was to prepare for its opening and to employ staff, and to enrol as many students as possible so that it might be a success from the moment the doors were opened in October 1896.

The result was 1000 students enrolled in the first year, to be taught by 34 staff. All the students were at elementary level and most attended evening classes while working during the day. Courses ranged from English, mathematics, chemistry and physics to more vocational classes such as machine construction, plumbing, dress-making, and millinery.

The Northern Polytechnic Institute went from strength to strength. New buildings began to be erected during Dunn's time in charge there, with the Great Hall being opened in 1897, and other large additions completed in 1902. In January 1900 at the prize-giving, Dunn was able to report that the institute had grown very rapidly and was still growing, the number of students by then being two thousand. "There is no doubt", Dunn assured his audience, "that England is in no way behind any other country in the world as regards technical education".

A year later Dunn was able to record a further rise in student numbers and to report that there was a growing tendency to take advantage of the institute, especially in the trade and industrial classes.

In 1901, however, after 6 years at the institute, Dunn left academia to practice as an analytical and consulting chemist. At the end of the academic year he left London to return to his roots in Newcastle upon Tyne.

== Analytical and consulting chemist ==
In the early summer of 1901 Dunn joined "Consulting Chemists, Analysts, Assayers and Samplers" J and H S Pattinson as a partner with John Pattinson. The firm had been founded in the year of Dunn's birth – 1858 – and set up offices and a laboratory at 75 The Side in Newcastle upon Tyne, where they concentrated on coal purity testing and food analysis.

With Dunn as a partner they moved to larger offices and laboratories nearby at 10 Dean Street in Newcastle and vastly extended their operations. (The firm is still in operation elsewhere in Newcastle as Pattinson Scientific Services Limited.)

On Pattinson's death in 1912, Dunn became Principal of the firm with junior partner Charles Bloxam and took over Pattinson's duties as the public analyst for the City and County of Newcastle upon Tyne, the County of Northumberland, the County Boroughs of Gateshead, Sunderland, South Shields, Tynemouth, and the Borough of Berwick-upon-Tweed. He also became the Official Gas Examiner and the Official Agriculture Analyst.

Dunn remained as the senior partner of J and H S Pattinson until his death in 1939, giving up his public appointments only with the onset of illness in 1937.

== Membership of professional societies, institutes and associations ==
Dunn was very active in professional organisations, the most significant being his membership of the Royal Society of Chemistry to which he was elected as a member in 1905. A year later he was elected a member of the society's council and was to serve on the council for three periods. In 1917–18 he was vice-president and in 1930 was elected president.

He was a Fellow of the Royal Institute of Chemistry, being a member of its council from 1918 to 1921 and an examiner from 1921 to 1925 and from 1927 to 1932.

In 1930 he was president of the Society of Public Analysts.

He was president of the Society of Chemical Industry in 1933–34, having first joined the Newcastle Chemical Society as early as 1877, which later merged with the SCI.

From 1937 to 1938 he was president of the North of England Gas Managers' Association. He was also president of the Newcastle Chemical Industry Club, was connected with the British Standards Institution, and was a member of the Scientific and Industrial Fuel Research Department.

He also served on the council of Armstrong College in Newcastle, the successor to the College of Physical Science.

== Publications ==
Dunn was co-author with V A Mundella, the man he appointed as head of the Department of Physics and Electrical engineering at the North London Institute and who later became Dunn's son-in-law, of a much-needed science textbook: General Elementary Science. It was published in 1899 by Methuen Publishing as the first of the Methuen's Science Primers series, and was promoted as "An Introductory Course for students in schools and technical colleges preparatory to the more formal study of mechanics, physics and chemistry". The book was a success, being regarded as an intermediate course in Physics and Chemistry for London Matriculation, and also being adopted by the Admiralty for teaching elementary Science. It went to a second edition nine years later, in 1908, and was still being actively marketed by Methuen in October 1909. (Dunn's co-author, Victor Mundella, later became Principal of Sunderland Technical College.).

In 1924 Dunn's second book was published, by Ernest Benn of London. Commissioned by the publishers, Pulverised and Colloidal Fuel is a treatise on the use of powdered fuels to produce power. It was well-reviewed by Dunn's peers, with the author congratulated on his success in bringing under one cover the many sources of information on the subject. The book was published in the United States in the same year, by the Van Nostrand Company of New York City.

Dunn also contributed many papers for the journal of the Royal Institute of Chemistry, and a number of other scientific journals.

== Personal life ==
In 1884 Dunn married Frances Thomas, the surviving daughter of Newcastle herbal practitioner and medical botanist Josiah Thomas, who had been tried for the manslaughter of one of his patients in 1867, but was cleared of all charges. They had one child, Laura.

Dunn was an enthusiastic supporter of many organisations. Apart from his long-term membership of the Literary and Philosophical Society of Newcastle upon Tyne, which he had joined at the age of 14 in 1872, and of which he became a vice-president, he was a member of Newcastle's Liberal Club and joined the Newcastle branch of Rotary International, serving as its president in 1921–22 and representing Newcastle Rotarians at the International Conference in Minneapolis in 1928.

Like his father and grandfather before him, he was a hereditary freeman of Newcastle and was a member of the ancient House Carpenters' Company. (His paternal grandfather had been a Newcastle house carpenter and joiner.) Dunn held office as Senior Steward of the Guild.

On 3 January 1939 in Newcastle Dunn died at the age of 80 of pneumonia, a complication of the cancer which had been diagnosed two years before.

Many admiring obituaries were published in newspapers and professional journals. One obituarist described him as "the Father of Tyneside Chemistry". His junior partner Charles Bloxam wrote in the journal of the Royal Society of Chemistry that:

"An eminent man has gone from us, but his example remains, and fortunately the many who came in contact with him during his early scholastic and university life, and later in his numerous public and professional activities, have had the opportunity to profit by it. A cultured and scholarly man, of quiet and kindly disposition, tolerant of the views of others, yet ever ready stoutly to defend his own opinions with a vigour that surprised those who were unacquainted with the depths of his character".
