= Then and Now (The Who album) =

2004 compilation album by the Who

Greatest hits album by the Who
- Released: 3 May 2004
- Recorded: 1964–2004
- Genre: Rock
- Length: 77:13
- Label: Polydor; Geffen
- Producer: Glyn Johns; Kit Lambert; Bill Szymczyk; Shel Talmy; Simon Townshend; The Who
- Compiler: Andy McKaie

The Who chronology
Live at the Royal Albert Hall (2003)	Then and Now (2004)	The 1st Singles Box (2004)

Singles from Then and Now
- 1. "Real Good Looking Boy"/"Old Red Wine" Released: 2004

Then and Now 1964–2007

Compilation album
- Released: 11 June 2007
- Recorded: 1964–2006
- Length: 79:09
- Label: Polydor

Professional ratings
Review scores
Source	Rating
AllMusic	4/5 stars
Rolling Stone	4/5 stars

Then and Now is a 2004 greatest hits compilation album by the English rock band the Who released internationally by Polydor Records and by Geffen Records in the United States. It features 18 Who classics and two new tracks—"Real Good Looking Boy" and "Old Red Wine"—which were the first Who originals since "Dig" from Pete Townshend's 1989 album The Iron Man. "Real Good Looking Boy" is a tribute to Elvis Presley, and "Old Red Wine" is a tribute to former band member John Entwistle, who died in 2002. The album was re-released in 2007 and replaced "Old Red Wine" with "It's Not Enough" from the 2006 album Endless Wire and "Summertime Blues" was replaced by "Baba O'Riley".

== Track listing ==
All songs written by Pete Townshend except where noted.

1. "I Can't Explain" – 2:06
2. "My Generation" – 3:18
3. "The Kids Are Alright" (Single edit) – 2:46
4. "Substitute" – 3:48
5. "I'm a Boy" – 2:37
6. "Happy Jack" – 2:11
7. "I Can See for Miles" – 4:07
8. "Magic Bus" – 3:20
9. "Pinball Wizard" – 3:02
10. "See Me, Feel Me" – 3:26
11. "Summertime Blues" (Live) – 3:25 (Eddie Cochran, Jerry Capehart)
12. "Behind Blue Eyes" – 3:41
13. "Won't Get Fooled Again" – 8:32
14. "5:15" – 5:02
15. "Love, Reign o'er Me" (Single edit) – 3:10
16. "Squeeze Box" – 2:42
17. "Who Are You" (Single edit) – 5:05
18. "You Better You Bet" – 5:37
19. "Real Good Looking Boy" (Townshend, Luigi Creatore, Hugo Peretti, George David Weiss) – 5:42
20. "Old Red Wine" – 3:43

=== Disc 2 of Japanese edition ===
1. "Great Shakes" 1:05
2. "Magic Bus" (Full Version) 4:36
3. "Eyesight To The Blind" (Alternative Vocal) 2:14
4. "Postcard" (Unreleased EP Version) 3:26
5. "I Don't Even Know Myself" (Unreleased EP Version) 4:09

=== 2007 edition ===
The album was reissued in 2007, with two alterations in the track listing:

11. "Baba O'Riley" – 5:00
20. "It's Not Enough" (Townshend, Rachel Fuller) – 4:05

== Song information ==
=== "Old Red Wine" ===
"Old Red Wine" was released as a B-side with "Real Good Looking Boy". The song was written for the Who's former bassist John Entwistle, who died two years prior to the release of Then and Now before a 2002 tour of North America.

The riff at the end of the song predated the actual song by a few years, being played at the end of some versions of "My Generation" from the 2000 tour. The riff was also played in a performance of the same song during Entwistle's last show, at the Royal Albert Hall on 8 February 2002. Portions of the song were also played sometimes after "My Generation" on the band's 2002 (after Entwistle's death), 2004, 2006, 2007 and 2008 tours.

== Recording details ==
- "I Can't Explain"
  - Released as a non-album single
  - November 1964, Pye Studios, London, England
- "My Generation" and "The Kids Are Alright"
  - From the studio album My Generation
  - October 1965, IBC Studios, London, England
- "Substitute"
  - Released as a non-album single
  - February 1966, Sound Studios, London, England
- "I'm a Boy"
  - Released as a non-album single
  - July–August 1966, IBC Studios, London, England
- "Happy Jack"
  - Released as a non-album single
  - November 1966, Regent Sound Studios and CBS Studios, London, England
- "I Can See for Miles"
  - From the studio album The Who Sell Out
  - May–August 1967, CBS Studios, London, England; Talentmasters Studios, New York City and Gold Star Studios, Los Angeles
- "Magic Bus"
  - From the compilation album Magic Bus: The Who on Tour
  - May 1968, Advision Studios, London, England
- "Pinball Wizard" and "See Me, Feel Me"
  - From the studio album Tommy
  - February 1969, Morgan Studios, London, England ("Pinball Wizard") and early 1969, IBC Studios, London, England ("See Me, Feel Me")
- "Summertime Blues"
  - From the live album Live at Leeds
  - 14 February 1970, University of Leeds, Leeds, West Yorkshire, England
- "Baba O'Riley", "Behind Blue Eyes" and "Won't Get Fooled Again"
  - From the studio album Who's Next
  - May–June 1971, Olympic Studios, London, England ("Behind Blue Eyes") and April–May 1971, The Rolling Stones' Mobile Studio, Stargroves, Hampshire, England
- "5.15" and "Love, Reign o'er Me"
  - From the studio album Quadrophenia
  - June 1973, The Kitchen, Battersea, London, England ("5:15") and Olympic Studios, London, England ("Love, Reign o'er Me")
- "Squeeze Box"
  - From the studio album The Who by Numbers
  - May–June 1975, Shepperton Studios' soundstage using Ronnie Lane's Mobile Studio, Shepperton, Surrey, England
- "Who Are You"
  - From the studio album Who Are You
  - October–December 1977, Ramport Studios, London, England and Eel Pie Studios, Goring Heath, South Oxfordshire, England
- "You Better You Bet"
  - From the studio album Face Dances
  - November 1980, Odyssey Studios, London, England
- "Real Good Looking Boy" and "Old Red Wine"
  - First released on this album
  - 2003–2004 ("Real Good Looking Boy") and 2004 ("Old Red Wine"), Eel Pie Studios, Goring Heath, South Oxfordshire, England
- "It's Not Enough"
  - From the studio album Endless Wire
  - 2002–2006, Eel Pie Studios, Goring Heath, South Oxfordshire, England

== Personnel ==
The Who

- Roger Daltrey – lead vocals
- John Entwistle – bass guitar, horn, backing vocals
- Kenney Jones – drums on "You Better You Bet" only
- Keith Moon – drums, percussion
- Pete Townshend – guitar, vocals, synthesizer, keyboards

Additional musicians

- Dave Arbus – violin on "Baba O'Riley"
- Rod Argent – piano on "Who Are You"
- John Bundrick – piano on "Real Good Looking Boy", Hammond organ and piano "Old Red Wine"
- Jolyon Dixon – acoustic guitar on "It's Not Enough"
- Andy Fairweather-Low – backing vocals on "Who Are You"
- Rachel Fuller – keyboards on "It's Not Enough"
- Peter Huntington – drums on "It's Not Enough"
- Greg Lake – bass guitar on "Real Good Looking Boy"
- Pino Palladino – bass guitar on "Old Red Wine"
- Stuart Ross – bass guitar on "It's Not Enough"
- Chris Stainton – piano on "5:15"
- Zak Starkey – drums on "Real Good Looking Boy" and "Old Red Wine"
- Simon Townshend – guitar and keyboards on "Real Good Looking Boy"

Production

- Jon Astley – mastering
- Myles Clarke – engineering on "Real Good Looking Boy" and "Old Red Wine"
- Glyn Johns – associate production on "Behind Blue Eyes," "Won't Get Fooled Again" and "Baba O'Riley", production on "Squeeze Box" and "Who Are You"
- Matt Kent – liner notes
- Kit Lambert – production on "I'm a Boy", "Happy Jack", "I Can See for Miles", "Magic Bus", and "See Me Feel Me"
- Billy Nicholls – production on "It's Not Enough"
- Bob Pridden – engineering on "Real Good Looking Boy" and "Old Red Wine", production on "It's Not Enough"
- Shel Talmy – production on "I Can't Explain", "My Generation", and "The Kids Are Alright"
- Pete Townshend – production on "It's Not Enough"
- Simon Townshend – production on "Real Good Looking Boy" and "Old Red Wine"
- The Who – production on "Summertime Blues", "Behind Blue Eyes", "Won't Get Fooled Again", "5:15", and "Love Reign o'er Me"

== Charts ==
=== Weekly charts ===
Chart (2004–2007)	Peak position
Australian Albums (ARIA)	96
Irish Albums (IRMA)	15
Scottish Albums (OCC)	9
Spanish Albums (Promusicae)	67
UK Albums (OCC)	5
US Billboard 200	57

=== Year-end charts ===
Chart (2004)	Position
UK Albums (OCC)	124
