= The 1st Singles Box =

Box set by the Who
- Released: April 2004
- Recorded: 1964–2004
- Genre: Power pop
- Length: 81:55
- Label: Polydor
- Producer: Various

The Who chronology
Then and Now (2004)	The 1st Singles Box (2004)	Wire & Glass (2006)

Professional ratings
Review scores
Source	Rating
The Encyclopedia of Popular Music	4/5 stars

The 1st Singles Box is a box set compilation of singles recorded by the English rock band the Who throughout their history. The album was released exclusively in the United Kingdom on 25 May 2004. It was considered the counterpart to the other compilation album by the Who, entitled Then and Now. The album was set with twelve compact discs containing two songs each, a la the A-side and B-side of the original single. Each individual CD was encased by a paper sleeve representing the single's original artwork from a particular country.

== Track listing ==
All songs written by Pete Townshend except where noted.

Disc one

1. "I Can't Explain" – 2:06
2. "Bald Headed Woman" (Shel Talmy) – 2:11

Disc two

1. "My Generation" – 3:20
2. "Shout and Shimmy" (James Brown) – 3:17

Disc three

1. "Substitute" – 3:51
2. "Circles" – 3:13

Disc four

1. "I'm a Boy" – 2:38
2. "In the City" (John Entwistle, Keith Moon) – 2:24

Disc five

1. "Happy Jack" – 2:11
2. "I've Been Away" (Entwistle) – 2:08

Disc six

1. "Pictures of Lily" – 2:45
2. "Doctor, Doctor" (Entwistle) – 3:01

Disc seven

1. "I Can See for Miles" – 4:08
2. "Someone's Coming" (Entwistle) – 2:31

Disc eight

1. "Pinball Wizard" – 3:04
2. "Dogs Part II" (Moon, Towser, Jason) – 2:27

Disc nine

1. "Won't Get Fooled Again" – 3:41
2. "Don't Know Myself" – 4:57

Disc ten

1. "5:15" – 4:23
2. "Water" – 4:42

Disc eleven

1. "Who Are You" – 5:08
2. "Had Enough" (Entwistle) – 4:31

Disc twelve

1. "Real Good Looking Boy" (Townshend, Luigi Creatore, Hugo Peretti and George David Weiss) – 5:43
2. "Old Red Wine" – 3:44

== Personnel ==
- Pete Townshend – Lead Guitar & Vocals
- Roger Daltrey – Lead Vocals, Harmonica & Rhythm Guitar
- John Entwistle – Bass, Vocals, French Horn, Trumpet, Other Brass, Keyboards & Synthesizer
- Keith Moon – Drums & Vocals
- Zak Starkey – Drums on Real Good Looking Boy & Old Red Wine
- John Bundrick – Piano & Hammond organ on Real Good Looking Boy & Old Red Wine
- Simon Townshend – Guitar & Keyboards on Real Good Looking Boy
- Pino Palladino – Bass on Old Red Wine
- Greg Lake – Bass on Real Good Looking Boy

Design

- Design & Art Direction by Richard Evans
