= The Who Tour 2006–2007 =

2006–2007 concert tour by the Who

- Tour by The Who
- Location: Europe; South Africa; United States
- Associated album: Endless Wire
- Start date: 7 June 2006
- End date: 1 December 2007
- Legs: 5
- No. of shows: 113

The Who concert chronology
- The Who 2005 performances (2005); Endless Wire Tour (2006–07); The Who Tour 2008–2009 (2008–09)

The Who Tour 2006–2007 was the Who's first worldwide concert tour since 1997, supporting their Endless Wire album.

== History ==
In December 2005, Rolling Stone magazine announced that the Who would be touring in the summer of 2006, visiting Australia, Canada, Japan, Spain, the United Kingdom, and the United States. In advance of their new Endless Wire album release, the band embarked on a 24-date European tour followed by their first world tour, their first shows since their short 2004 tours and brief performance at Live 8 in 2005. Members of the group's 2002 and 2004 line-up remained, namely Roger Daltrey and Pete Townshend but also including keyboardist John "Rabbit" Bundrick (due to the illness of his wife, replaced on 25 shows over two legs of the tour by his keyboard tech, Brian Kehew), bassist Pino Palladino, drummer Zak Starkey and guitarist/backup vocalist Simon Townshend. Opening acts featured on the worldwide tour included The Casbah Club, Peeping Tom, moe., Inward Eye, Rose Hill Drive, The Pretenders, and The Tragically Hip.

It was announced at short notice that the opening gig of the tour would be at the University of Leeds Refectory on 17 June, the same venue at which the band recorded the Live at Leeds album in 1970. Tickets to this particular show were sold in person only from the Leeds University Union, with sales limited to two tickets per person. Before the concert Daltrey and Townshend unveiled a blue plaque to commemorate the recording of Live at Leeds at the same venue 36 years before. The show was so greatly anticipated that the BBC covered the story, both on the day of the concert and the day after, including interviews with audience members as they were leaving the performance.

In July, the group played a number of music festivals around the UK, including the second day of Hyde Park Calling, a concert to celebrate the twenty year anniversary of the Hard Rock Cafe, on 2 July, Oxegen in Ireland on 8 July, and T in the Park in Scotland on 9 July. When the Who performed at Hyde Park Calling, they were joined by Top Gear presenters Jeremy Clarkson, James May and Richard Hammond to test vans. The episode was broadcast on 30 July 2006.

Shows from the entire European tour were broadcast online at the band's website. Video streaming company Streaming Tank were in charge of broadcasting the concerts, headed up by the technical team for The Lord of the Rings film trilogy. This was the first attempt by any band to broadcast entire shows via the Internet since the Pixelon-sponsored "Vegas Job" (later released on DVD as The Vegas Job) in October 1999, which had been the band's first attempt at live broadcasting over the internet. Most of the European shows were preceded in the broadcast by an episode of the web TV program, In The Attic, presented by Rachel Fuller and Mikey Cuthbert. At festivals such as the O2 Festival in Leeds, the opening artists for the Who appeared as guests on the show once they came off stage.

On 12 September, The band opened the first leg of the North American tour in Philadelphia at the Wachovia Center, then later appeared at the BBC's Electric Proms and on the Parkinson before returning to the United States. The second North American leg concluded in Columbus, Ohio on 11 December.

The group spent most of the first half of 2007 touring again, starting with a return trip to North America that began on 23 February in Reno, Nevada and ended on 26 March in Hollywood, Florida, followed by the band's Teenage Cancer Trust benefit concert at the Royal Albert Hall in London on 31 March. An extensive trip through various parts of the United Kingdom and Europe began in Lisbon, Portugal on 16 May and concluded in Helsinki, Finland on 9 July. The band also did a one-off show on 6 October at Messegelände in Hanover, Germany to celebrate the International Volkswagen Minibus Meeting. The band also flew to South Africa to do another 46664 concert to celebrate World AIDS Day.

The 2006–2007 tours were financially successful and well received by fans and critics alike, with only a couple of minor setbacks. One incident occurred on 8 December 2006 in Saint Paul, Minnesota, when Daltrey's voice gave out near the end of a performance. Daltrey had apologised to the audience earlier in the concert, saying that he was suffering from bronchitis. On 13 March 2007 the band came on stage as usual in Tampa, Florida but abruptly ended the show moments into the opening number when it became painfully clear that Daltrey was unable to sing at all. Townshend stopped the band and apologised, saying they wanted to at least "give it a go" despite Daltrey being seriously ill with an upper respiratory infection. The band's manager Bill Curbishley quickly rescheduled the show, which was successfully performed on 25 March. Dates in Mexico City and San Antonio, Texas were also postponed, but the band ultimately chose to cancel them instead. Another incident occurred in Verona, Italy, on 11 June 2007 when a massive rainstorm forced the band to stop the concert after only five songs, and when they came back on stage over an hour later, Daltrey found himself unable to sing. Townshend announced the show was cancelled, but ferocious booing from the rain-soaked crowd persuaded the band to return to the stage 40 minutes later to play the rest of the set, this time with Pete doing most of the vocals and a raucous and visibly frustrated Daltrey singing just a verse here and there when his voice permitted, giving all he could in the final "Won't Get Fooled Again".

== Live releases ==
Live material from 2006–2007 has appeared on the following releases:

- Every performance from 2006–2007 was recorded on both CD and DVD, and (except for the Leeds concert) is available as part of the Encore Series 2006 and 2007 scheme of releases.
- Parts of the band's show of 17 July 2006 at Théâtre Antique in Vienne, Isère, France (near Lyon) were included on CD and DVD in the expanded edition of the Endless Wire album:
  - CD includes: "The Seeker", "Who Are You", "Mike Post Theme", "The Relay", "Greyhound Girl", "Naked Eye", "Won't Get Fooled Again"/"Old Red Wine".
  - DVD includes: "I Can't Explain", "Behind Blue Eyes", "Mike Post Theme", "Baba O'Riley", "Won't Get Fooled Again"/"Old Red Wine".

== Tour band ==
- Roger Daltrey – lead vocals, harmonica, acoustic guitar, rhythm guitar, tambourine
- Pete Townshend – lead guitar, acoustic guitar, vocals, banjo

Additional Members

- Pino Palladino – bass guitar
- Zak Starkey – drums
- John "Rabbit" Bundrick – keyboards, piano, backing vocals
- Simon Townshend – rhythm guitar, acoustic guitar, vocals, mandolin
- Brian Kehew – keyboards, piano (substituted for Bundrick over a period in late 2006)

== Typical set lists ==
=== 2006 UK/Europe leg ===
This particular leg of the tour lasted from 7 June 2006 in Hertfordshire until 29 July 2006 in Zaragoza, Spain. This leg featured the first live performances of certain songs from Endless Wire, such as the mini-opera "Wire & Glass" and "Mike Post Theme". The typical setlist consisted of ( All songs written by Pete Townshend except where noted)

1. "I Can't Explain"
2. "The Seeker"
3. "Anyway, Anyhow, Anywhere" (Roger Daltrey and Townshend)
4. "Who Are You"
5. "Behind Blue Eyes"
6. "Sound Round" (Dropped after 25 June)
7. "Pick Up The Peace" (Dropped after 25 June)
8. "Endless Wire" (Dropped after 25 June)
9. "We Got A Hit" (Dropped after 25 June)
10. "They Made My Dream Come True" (Dropped after 25 June)
11. "Mirror Door" (Dropped after 25 June)
12. "Real Good Looking Boy" (Townshend, Luigi Creatore, Hugo Peretti and George David Weiss)
13. "Mike Post Theme" (not on 7 June; and 8 July.)
14. "Baba O'Riley"
15. "The Kids Are Alright"
16. "Naked Eye" (Added on 14 July)
17. "The Relay" (Added on 11 July)
18. "You Better You Bet" (Added on 5 July)
19. "My Generation" (Added on 28 June)
20. "Won't Get Fooled Again"
21. "Substitute"
22. "Pinball Wizard"
23. "Amazing Journey"
24. "Sparks"
25. "See Me, Feel Me"

There were some set list substitutions, variations, and order switches during the tour. "Old Red Wine" was not performed at all the shows, and was sometimes attached to the end of "Won't Get Fooled Again" or "See Me, Feel Me". Three of the first four shows had the Tommy medley played as the regular set ender with "Won't Get Fooled Again" moving to the encore. Other songs occasionally played were:

- "Let's See Action" (Performed on 17 and 28 June and 5, 11, 12, 15, and 23 July).
- "Old Red Wine" (Performed on 25 and 30 June and 15, 17, 18, 22, and 27 July)
- "Eminence Front" (Performed on 17 June)
- "Magic Bus" (Performed on 15 July)
- "Cry If You Want" (Performed on 17, 25, and 28 June and 27 and 29 July)
- "Bargain" (Performed on 28 and 30 June and 2 and 3 July)
- "Love, Reign o'er Me" (Performed on 28 and 30 June and 2, 3, 5, 6, 9, 20, 22, 27, and 29 July.)
- "I'm One" (Performed on 30 June)
- "Greyhound Girl" (Pete Townshend solo song) (Performed on 14 and 17 July)
- "Drowned" (acoustic) (Performed on 18 and 25 June and 2, 6, 18, 27, and 29 July)

=== 2006 US/Canada leg ===
This particular leg of the tour lasted from 12 September 2006 in Philadelphia until 11 December 2006 in Columbus, Ohio. Here is the typical setlist of the first leg, all songs written by Pete Townshend except where noted.

1. "I Can't Explain"
2. "The Seeker"
3. "Anyway, Anyhow, Anywhere" (Roger Daltrey and Townshend)
4. "Baba O'Riley"
5. "Behind Blue Eyes"
6. "Real Good Looking Boy" (Townshend, Luigi Creatore, Hugo Peretti and George David Weiss)
7. "Sound Round"
8. "Pick Up the Peace"
9. "Endless Wire"
10. "We Got a Hit"
11. "They Made My Dream Come True"
12. "Mirror Door"
13. "The Relay"
14. "You Better You Bet"
15. "Who Are You"
16. "A Man in a Purple Dress"
17. "Black Widow's Eyes"
18. "Fragments" (Lawrence Ball and Townshend)
19. "My Generation"
20. "Cry If You Want"
21. "Won't Get Fooled Again"
22. "Substitute"
23. "Pinball Wizard"
24. "Amazing Journey"
25. "Sparks"
26. "See Me, Feel Me"
27. "Tea & Theatre"

By the time the band reached the second leg of this tour, on November, they switched the order of a few songs, added some and dropped some as well. Here is the typical setlist for the second US leg, All songs written by Pete Townshend except where noted.

1. "I Can't Explain"
2. "The Seeker"
3. "Substitute" (Replaced with "Anyway, Anyhow, Anywhere" (Roger Daltrey and Townshend) after 18 November)
4. "Fragments" (Lawrence Ball and Townshend)
5. "Who Are You"
6. "Behind Blue Eyes"
7. "Sound Round"
8. "Pick Up the Peace"
9. "Endless Wire"
10. "We Got a Hit"
11. "They Made My Dream Come True"
12. "Mirror Door"
13. "Baba O'Riley"
14. "Eminence Front"
15. "A Man in a Purple Dress"
16. "Mike Post Theme"
17. "You Better You Bet"
18. "My Generation"
19. "Cry If You Want"
20. "Won't Get Fooled Again"
21. "Pinball Wizard"
22. "Amazing Journey"
23. "Sparks"
24. "See Me, Feel Me"
25. "Tea & Theatre"

There were some set list substitutions, variations, and order switches during the tour. "Black Widow's Eyes" was sometimes inserted between "A Man in a Purple Dress" and "Mike Post Theme". Also, at a concert in Saint Paul, Minnesota, the traditional encore was skipped and a medley of "My Generation", "Cry If You Want" and "Naked Eye" was played because singer Roger Daltrey left the stage due to voice problems. Here is a list of the rest of the songs performed on the tour but not on the above lists:

- "Naked Eye" (Performed on 25 September and 8 and 11 December)
- "Unholy Trinity" (Performed on 12 and 13 September and 5 October)
- "Bargain" (Performed on 25 September)
- "My Generation Blues" (Performed on 25 September)
- "Old Red Wine" (Performed on 10 October and 11 December)
- "Overture" (Performed on 5 November)

=== 2007 US leg ===
This particular leg of the tour lasted from 23 February 2007 in Reno, Nevada until 26 March 2007 in Hollywood, Florida. Here is a typical setlist for the leg of the tour, All songs written by Pete Townshend except where noted.

1. "I Can't Explain"
2. "The Seeker"
3. "Anyway, Anyhow, Anywhere" (Roger Daltrey and Townshend)
4. "Fragments" (Lawrence Ball and Townshend)
5. "Who Are You"
6. "Behind Blue Eyes"
7. "Real Good Looking Boy" (Townshend, Luigi Creatore, Hugo Peretti and George David Weiss)
8. "Sound Round"
9. "Pick Up the Peace"
10. "Endless Wire"
11. "We Got a Hit"
12. "They Made My Dream Come True"
13. "Mirror Door"
14. "Baba O'Riley"
15. "Eminence Front"
16. "A Man in a Purple Dress"
17. "Black Widow's Eyes"
18. "You Better You Bet"
19. "My Generation"
20. "Cry If You Want"
21. "Won't Get Fooled Again"
22. "Pinball Wizard"
23. "Amazing Journey""Sparks"
24. "See Me, Feel Me"
25. "Tea & Theatre"

There were some set list substitutions, variations, and order switches during the tour. "Mike Post Theme" was played at the first concert in Reno on 23 February 2007. At the same concert, "The Relay" was substituted for "You Better You Bet", the only occurrence of that on this particular leg of the tour. Also, at three concerts (23, 25 and 26 March), a combination of "The Kids Are Alright" and "Substitute" was performed instead of the mini-opera. Here is a list of the rest of the songs performed on the tour but not on the above list:

- "The Relay"
  - Performed on 23 February.
- "Mike Post Theme"
  - Performed on 23 February.
- "Naked Eye"
  - Performed on 26 (as encore) & 28 (as encore) February; and 5 (as encore), 8 (as encore) & 23 March.
- "The Kids Are Alright"
  - Performed on 23, 25 & 26 March.
- "Substitute"
  - Performed on 23, 25 & 26 March.
- "Dirty Water" (Pete Townshend solo song)
  - Performed (briefly) on 23 March.
- "Ring of Fire" (Johnny Cash)
  - Performed on 23 March.

=== 2007 UK/Europe leg ===
This particular leg of the tour lasted from 16 May 2007 in Lisbon, Portugal until 9 July 2007 in Helsinki, Finland (with an additional concert on 6 October 2007 in Hanover, Germany for a VW Bus Convention). This particular set is taken from a concert at the Atlántico Pavilion in Lisbon, Portugal on 16 May 2007. All songs written by Pete Townshend except where noted.

1. "I Can't Explain"
2. "The Seeker"
3. "Fragments" (Lawrence Ball and Townshend)
4. "Who Are You"
5. "Behind Blue Eyes"
6. "Real Good Looking Boy" (Townshend, Luigi Creatore, Hugo Peretti and George David Weiss) (Added on 5 June)
7. "Sound Round"
8. "Pick Up the Peace"
9. "Endless Wire"
10. "We Got a Hit"
11. "They Made My Dream Come True"
12. "Mirror Door"
13. "Baba O'Riley"
14. "Eminence Front"
15. "Drowned"
16. "A Man in a Purple Dress"
17. "The Real Me"
18. "5.15" (Replaced by "You Better You Bet" after 22 May)
19. "My Generation"
20. "Cry If You Want" (Dropped after 29 June)
21. "Won't Get Fooled Again"
22. "The Kids Are Alright"
23. "Pinball Wizard"
24. "Amazing Journey"/"Sparks"
25. "See Me, Feel Me"
26. "Tea & Theatre"

There were some set list substitutions, variations, and order switches during the tour. The third song slot alternated between "Substitute", "The Relay" and "Anyway, Anyhow, Anywhere". At certain shows, the mini-opera was dropped as well. Here is a list of the rest of the songs performed on the tour but not on the above list:

- "Mike Post Theme"
  - Performed on 8 February; and 17, 22 & 23 May.
- "The Relay"
  - Performed on 17, 19, 22, 23, 25, 26 & 30 May; and 1, 8, 9, 11, 13, 16, 18, 19, 23, 24 & 29 June; and 4 & 9 July and 6 October.
- "I'm One"
  - Performed on 23 May.
- "Anyway, Anyhow, Anywhere" (Roger Daltrey and Townshend)
  - Performed on 1, 16, 18, 19, 23, 24, 26, 27, 29 & 30 June; and 4, 6 & 7 July; and 6 October.
- "Magic Bus"
  - Performed on 11 June; and 7 July; and 6 October.
- "Let's See Action"
  - Performed on 11 June.
- "Old Red Wine"
  - Performed on 11 June and other dates.

=== 46664 concert set ===
To celebrate World AIDS Day, the Who made only their second ever appearance in South Africa to again perform at Nelson Mandela's 46664 concerts, this time on 1 December in Johannesburg. All songs written by Pete Townshend.

1. "Baba O'Riley"
2. "My Generation"
3. "Substitute"
4. "Pinball Wizard"
5. "Love, Reign o'er Me"
6. "You Better You Bet"
7. "Magic Bus"
8. "Eminence Front"
9. "Who Are You"
10. "Won't Get Fooled Again"

== Tour dates ==
Date	City	Country	Venue	Opening Act
Europe
7 June 2006	Hertfordshire	England	Knebworth House	N/A
17 June 2006	Leeds	England	University of Leeds Refectory	N/A
18 June 2006	Brighton	England	Brighton Centre	N/A
25 June 2006	Leeds	England	O2 Wireless Festival	The Zutons; Super Furry Animals; The Flaming Lips; Eels; The Answer
28 June 2006	Bristol	England	Ashton Gate Stadium	Never the Bride; The Zutons
30 June 2006	Werchter	Belgium	Rock Werchter	Festival
2 July 2006	London	England	Hyde Park	Kharma 45; Ocean Colour Scene; Primal Scream; Razorlight; Rose Hill Drive
3 July 2006	Hampshire	England	Beaulieu Motor Museum	N/A
5 July 2006	Liverpool	England	Liverpool Docks	N/A
6 July 2006	Liverpool	England	Liverpool Docks	N/A
8 July 2006	Naas	Ireland	Oxegen	N/A
9 July 2006	Balado	Scotland	T in the Park	
11 July 2006	Bonn	Germany	Museumplatz	
12 July 2006	Berlin	Germany	Treptow Arena	
13 July 2006	Berlin	Germany	Fritz Club	
14 July 2006	Locarno	Switzerland	Piazza Grande	
15 July 2006	Monte Carlo	Monaco	Salle des Étoiles	
17 July 2006	Vienne	France	Theatre Antique	
18 July 2006	Metz	France	Galaxie Amnéville	
20 July 2006	Nyon	Switzerland	Paléo Festival	
22 July 2006	Sankt Pölten	Austria	Lovely Days Festival	
23 July 2006	Ulm	Germany	Münsterplatz	
27 July 2006	Madrid	Spain	Palacio de los Deportes	
29 July 2006	Zaragoza	Spain	Pabellón Principe Felipe	
29 October 2006	Chalk Farm	England	The Roundhouse	
North America
12 September 2006	Philadelphia	United States	Wachovia Center	Peeping Tom
13 September 2006	Wantagh	United States	Jones Beach	Peeping Tom
15 September 2006	Ottawa	Canada	Scotiabank Place	Peeping Tom
16 September 2006	Boston	United States	TD Banknorth Garden	Peeping Tom
18 September 2006	New York City	United States	Madison Square Garden	Peeping Tom
19 September 2006	New York City	United States	Madison Square Garden	Peeping Tom
21 September 2006	Holmdel Township	United States	PNC Bank Arts Center	Peeping Tom
23 September 2006	Baltimore	United States	Pimlico Race Course	
25 September 2006	Chicago	United States	United Center	Moe
26 September 2006	Des Moines	United States	Wells Fargo Center	Moe
29 September 2006	Auburn Hills	United States	The Palace of Auburn Hills	Moe
30 September 2006	London	Canada	John Labatt Centre	Moe
3 October 2006	Winnipeg	Canada	MTS Centre	Inward Eye
5 October 2006	Calgary	Canada	Pengrowth Saddledome	Inward Eye
6 October 2006	Edmonton	Canada	Rexall Place	Inward Eye
8 October 2006	Vancouver	Canada	General Motors Place	
10 October 2006	Portland	United States	Rose Garden	
11 October 2006	Seattle	United States	KeyArena	
4 November 2006	Los Angeles	United States	Hollywood Bowl	
5 November 2006	Los Angeles	United States	Hollywood Bowl	
8 November 2006	San Jose	United States	HP Pavilion	
10 November 2006	Paradise	United States	Mandalay Bay Events Center	The Pretenders
11 November 2006	Indian Wells	United States	Indian Wells Tennis Garden	The Pretenders
13 November 2006	Salt Lake City	United States	Delta Center	The Pretenders
14 November 2006	Denver	United States	Pepsi Center	The Pretenders
17 November 2006	Dallas	United States	American Airlines Center	The Pretenders
18 November 2006	Houston	United States	Toyota Center	The Pretenders
20 November 2006	Sunrise	United States	Bank Atlantic Arena	The Pretenders
22 November 2006	Duluth	United States	Gwinnett Center	The Pretenders
24 November 2006	Atlantic City	United States	The Borgata	New York Dolls; The Pretenders
25 November 2006	Philadelphia	United States	Wachovia Center	The Pretenders
27 November 2006	Hershey	United States	Giant Center	The Pretenders
28 November 2006	Bridgeport	United States	Arena at Harbor Yard	The Pretenders
1 December 2006	Uncasville	United States	Mohegan Sun Arena	The Pretenders
2 December 2006	Boston	United States	TD Banknorth Garden	The Pretenders
4 December 2006	Toronto	Canada	Air Canada Centre	The Pretenders
5 December 2006	Grand Rapids	United States	Van Andel Arena	The Pretenders
7 December 2006	Omaha	United States	QWest Center	The Pretenders
8 December 2006	Saint Paul	United States	Xcel Energy Center	The Pretenders
11 December 2006	Columbus, Ohio	United States	Value City Arena	The Pretenders
Europe
8 February 2007	London	England	The Hospital Club	
North America
23 February 2007	Reno	United States	Reno Events Center	
25 February 2007	Fresno	United States	Save Mart Center	
26 February 2007	Long Beach	United States	Civic Center	
28 February 2007	Phoenix	United States	US Airways Center	
1 March 2007	San Diego	United States	iPayOne Center	
5 March 2007	Hoffman Estates	United States	Sears Centre	
6 March 2007	Indianapolis	United States	Conseco Fieldhouse	
8 March 2007	Washington, D.C.	United States	Verizon Center	
9 March 2007	Atlantic City	United States	The Borgata	
11 March 2007	Uniondale	United States	Nassau Coliseum	
22 March 2007	North Little Rock	United States	Alltel Arena	
23 March 2007	Oklahoma City	United States	Ford Center	
25 March 2007	Tampa	United States	Ford Amphitheater	
26 March 2007	Hollywood	United States	Seminole Hard Rock Hotel and Casino Hollywood	
Europe
31 March 2007	London	England	Royal Albert Hall	
16 May 2007	Lisbon	Portugal	Pavilhão Atlântico	
17 May 2007	Madrid	Spain	Palacio de los Deportes	
19 May 2007	Bilbao	Spain	Bizkaia Arena	
22 May 2007	Birmingham	England	National Indoor Arena	
23 May 2007	Sheffield	England	Sheffield Arena	
25 May 2007	Newcastle	England	Metro Radio Arena	
26 May 2007	Hull	England	KC Stadium	
30 May 2007	Peel	England	Peel Bay Festival	
1 June 2007	Swansea	Wales	Liberty Stadium	
2 June 2007	Southampton	England	Rose Bowl	
5 June 2007	Rotterdam	Netherlands	Rotterdam Ahoy	
6 June 2007	Paris	France	Palais omnisports de Paris-Bercy	
8 June 2007	Antwerp	Belgium	Lotto Arena	
9 June 2007	Fulda	Germany	Messe Galerie	
11 June 2007	Verona	Italy	Arena di Verona	
13 June 2007	Munich	Germany	Olympiahalle	
16 June 2007	Leipzig	Germany	Völkerschlachtdenkmal	
18 June 2007	Hamburg	Germany	Stadtpark	
19 June 2007	Oberhausen	Germany	König Pilsener Arena	
23 June 2007	Cheshire	England	Knowsley Hall	
24 June 2007	Glastonbury	England	Glastonbury Festival	
26 June 2007	London	England	Wembley Arena	
27 June 2007	London	England	Wembley Arena	
29 June 2007	Dublin	Ireland	Marlay Park	
30 June 2007	Cork	Ireland	Marquee	
4 July 2007	Kristiansand	Norway	Quart Festival	
6 July 2007	Stockholm	Sweden	Globe Arena	
7 July 2007	Roskilde	Denmark	Roskilde Festival	
9 July 2007	Helsinki	Finland	Hartwall Areena	
2007 International Volkswagen Minibus Meeting
6 October 2007	Hanover	Germany	Messegelände	
2007 46664 Concert for World AIDS Day
1 December 2007	Johannesburg	South Africa	Ellis Park	

== See also ==
- List of The Who tours and performances
