= Wire & Glass =

2006 EP by The Who

EP by the Who
- Released: 17 July 2006
- Genre: Rock
- Length: 11:28
- Label: Polydor
- Producer: Pete Townshend

The Who chronology
The 1st Singles Box (2004)	Wire & Glass (2006)	Endless Wire (2006)

The Who EP chronology
Won't Get Fooled Again (1988)	Wire & Glass (2006)

Wire & Glass (subtitled "Six songs from a mini-opera") is the only EP released from the Who's eleventh studio album, Endless Wire (2006). The EP was released exclusively to the iTunes Music Store on 17 July 2006, but a Maxi-CD/12" was released a week later in Australia and the United Kingdom. The EP was released as a "mini-opera" in six songs. No North American distribution was secured prior to the release of Endless Wire, but promo copies were pressed in France, Germany, Ireland, and Ukraine.

The EP reached the top three on the Canadian Singles Chart. The songs from this album were used in the rock musical adaptation of The Boy Who Heard Music which debuted in July 2007 as part of Vassar College's Powerhouse Summer Theater workshop series.

== The songs ==
"Sound Round" was reportedly written for the 1971 album Who's Next, but not recorded. "Mirror Door" was released ahead of the rock opera for radio play in June 2006, but initial reaction was indifferent due to a questionable mix. Between dates on the 2006 UK and European tour, Townshend remixed the track, adding echo to Daltrey's vocals and giving it a punchier sound.

== Track listing ==
All songs written by Pete Townshend

Wire & Glass track listing
No.	Title	Length
1.	"Wire & Glass: I. Sound Round – 1:22; II. Pick Up the Peace – 1:28; III. Endless Wire – 1:51; IV. We Got a Hit – 1:18; V. They Make My Dream Come True – 1:13"	7:12
2.	"Mirror Door"	4:16

Upon release as a CD/12", all six songs were presented as a single track.

== Personnel ==
The Who

- Roger Daltrey – vocals
- Pete Townshend – guitars, vocals, mandolin, ukulele, banjo

Additional musicians

- John "Rabbit" Bundrick – keyboards, organ
- Peter Huntington – drums (Note: Peter Huntington, the drummer for Pete Townshend's girlfriend, Rachel Fuller, plays drums on the EP due to the absence of regular Who drummer Zak Starkey as he was touring with Oasis.)
- Billy Nicholls – backing vocals
- Pino Palladino – bass guitar
- Simon Townshend – backing vocals

Production

- Myles Clarke – engineering
- Bob Pridden – engineering

Design

- Richard Evans – design and art direction
- Ross Halfin – cover photograph

== Charts ==
Chart performance for Wire & Glass
Chart (2006)	Peak position
Australia (ARIA)	51
Austria (Ö3 Austria Top 40)	31
Denmark (Tracklisten)	3
Germany (GfK)	58
New Zealand (Recorded Music NZ)	39
Spain (PROMUSICAE)	9
Switzerland (Schweizer Hitparade)	83
