= The Boy Who Heard Music =

2007 rock music work by Pete Townshend

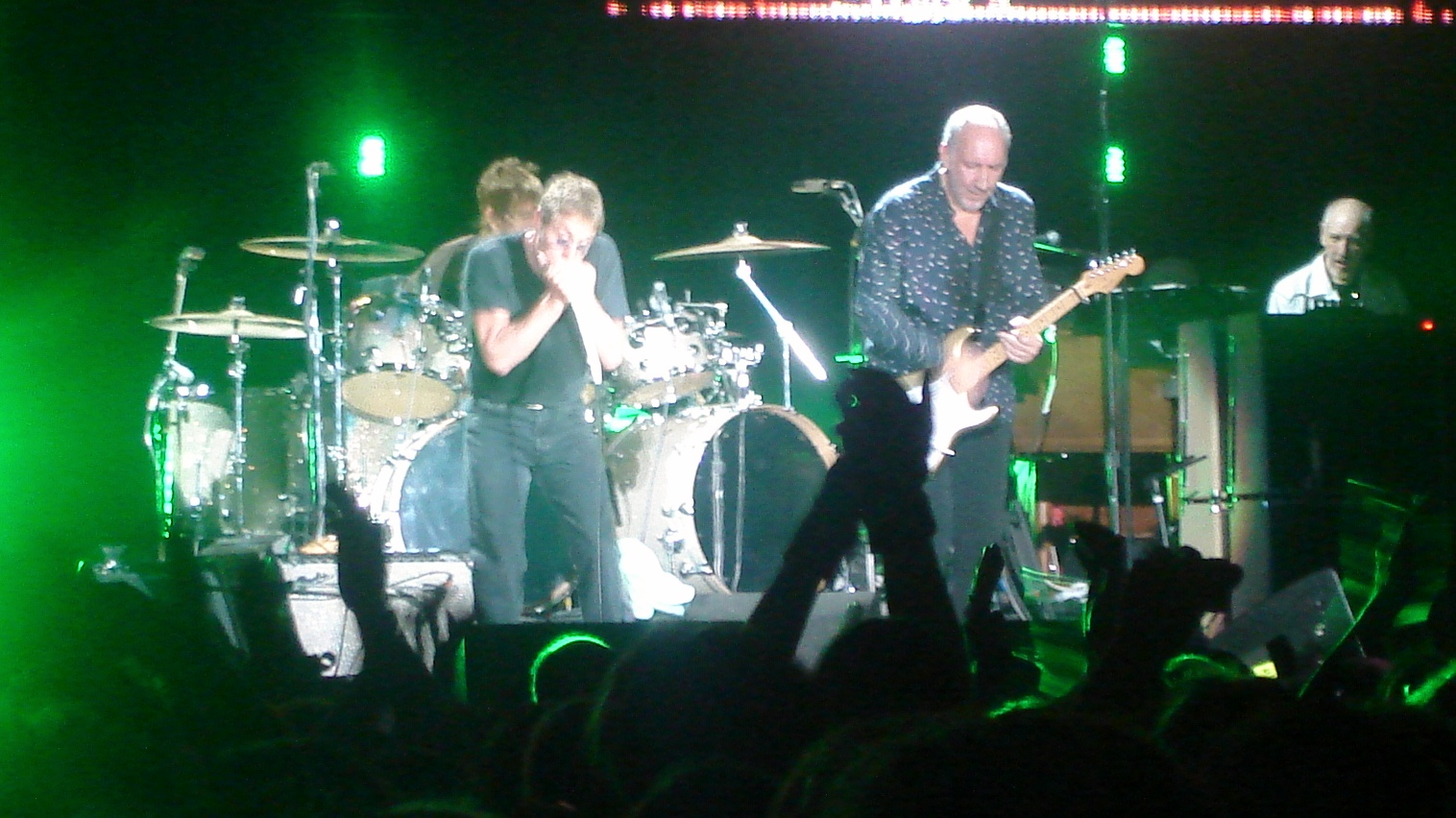
- The Who performing on their 2006–2007 tour to introduce the album Endless Wire
- Music: Pete Townshend; Rachel Fuller
- Lyrics: Pete Townshend; Rachel Fuller
- Book: Pete Townshend
- Basis: Internet novella
- Productions: 2007 Workshop

The Boy Who Heard Music is a rock opus that began life as an Internet novella written by the English musician and songwriter Pete Townshend. Townshend wrote in the foreword to the novella that he typically sketches out his opera in this way to lay out the plots and storylines, but in this case he published the material on an Internet blog site in 2005 and 2006, opening an interactive discussion with readers. The work was later released as a maxi-single and album by the Who and adapted as a rock opera.

== Synopsis ==
=== Main characters ===
- Ray High – older musician and narrator
- Leila Irani – member of Glass
- Gabriel Pirelli – member of Glass
- Joshua Cass – member of Glass
- Victoria – Internet Glass fan
- Angie – Glass fan, mother of Gabriel's son
- Dotty – Leila's friend, member of Glass
- Phil – member of Glass
- Simon – Josh's uncle
- Trilby – Gabriel's aunt
- Myrna – Simon's sister and Josh's mother
- Damoo – Leila's father, Ray's business partner
- Rastus Knight – Ray's manager
- Harold Silverman – Ray's art tutor, mentor and influence

=== Story events ===
The story covers a period in the life of three children from different ethnic backgrounds who grow up to form a band and develop the "Gridlife" concepts of older musician Ray High (a character who also appeared in Townshend's musical Psychoderelict). High is the narrator of the story which starts off in the year 2035, with the old Ray High in a mental institution in London. He is in an alternate plane of existence called "In the Ether" and looking backward. The younger characters are Gabriel who "could hear music", Josh who "could hear voices" and Leila who "could fly". The three live in the same neighbourhood but are of different religious faiths: Gabriel is Christian, Josh is Jewish and Leila is Muslim.

Ray High and Leila's father Damoo have been in a partnership called BBZee Studios. As children, Gabriel, Josh and Leila present a play in the studio which involves Josh's Uncle Simon dying and ascending to heaven. The children become interested in Ray and his band after watching tapes of an old concert, and form their own band called The Glass Household, based on Ray's notes and writings. Their fans often refer to the band as "Glass", which becomes a hit under the management of Ray's previous manager Rastus and his company PlusBond. The band's contract puts Leila in control of the company's pop-music distribution and she uses it to begin to make Ray's old ideas about the "grid" come true.

The two boys compete for Leila's affections, and she marries Gabriel, who finds it difficult to satisfy her. He becomes an alcoholic and a web porn addict and voyeur, reported by the press to have affairs with both men and women. While searching on his name, Gabriel discovers pictures of himself being sexually abused as a child. When Gabriel gets another woman pregnant, Leila leaves him to have an affair with Josh. Gabriel's son is killed in a car accident, and Gabriel's grief is used as the public reason why Gabriel will not participate in a Glass reunion concert in New York, though actually he and the other members of Glass are involved in a power struggle over control of rights to the music.

Gabriel is an ageing, reclusive drunk living in Ray High's old house when Josh shows up on his doorstep. Because Gabriel has refused use of Glass's music, Josh has run out of money, and he asks Gabriel to release the rights to the music so he can stage a Gridlife concert. Gabriel agrees, and the group travels separately to New York City, where the concert will be staged. Gabriel meets a woman in the Ritz Carlton, where he hears screaming children. Opening a window, he hears all the tragedies of New York playing out in the streets below. However, the concert will go on as scheduled as a tribute to the victims.

The concert takes place in Central Park with many bands participating in a programmed "Method" which produces individualised music for audience members, all of it combining to make the sound of an ocean. Ray seems to be there to take his bows, but he is actually watching a representation of the event at his old studio in Isleworth which is connected to the mental institution.

As the concert concludes, Josh grabs a gun from a security guard and shoots Gabriel. A massive staircase appears, accompanied by demons and angels, and Gabriel ascends. This is mirrored by the staircase at the studio where the children held their play many years ago.

The steps from the children's old stage set now lead to a pub called "The Black Hole". At an afterparty for the show, Gabriel passes by, entering the pub, and Ray says that he can no longer return because he has passed through The Mirror Door. Josh imagines Gabriel in The Black Hole, "piecing together the fragments with the help of a whiskey". Josh and Leila have tea, and then Leila leaves Josh in his own mental institution cell, alone with his "voices".

== Analysis ==
As is usual with Townshend's musicals and opera, the material seems semi-autobiographical, with Ray High resembling Townshend himself and the bands' histories paralleling that of The Who before and after the hiatus in the band's active working career.

This particular story also appears to be a continuation of material presented in Psychoderelict, using some of the same characters and extending Townshend's ideas about use and abuse of the Internet as a vehicle for media distribution.

The construction which gives the main characters different backgrounds provides a subtext of religious and ethnic discussion relating to issues of co-operation and conflict in current events.

== The Method ==
With the issue of Endless Wire, Townshend opened a website called The Lifehouse Method which makes musical portraits for "sitters" through a software application. A musical team including composer Lawrence Ball expects to further develop some of these portraits into larger compositions for a concert or series of concerts, resembling the "Method" described in the novella.

== Versions ==
=== Musicians ===
Musicians for the mini-opera and full album version include:

- Roger Daltrey: vocals
- Pete Townshend: guitars, vocals, "mini guitar"
- Pino Palladino: bass guitar
- Peter Huntington, Zak Starkey: drums
- John "Rabbit" Bundrick: keyboards, organ
- Simon Townshend & Billy Nicholls: backing vocals

=== Mini-opera ===
The Who's mini-opera Wire and Glass was based on the novella story, first released as a maxi-single and then appearing on The Who's 2006 album Endless Wire. Wire and Glass was released in the UK 17 July 2006 on iTunes and 24 July 2006 as a CD.

Songs from the mini-opera Wire and Glass include:

- "Sound Round" – 1:22
- "Pick Up the Peace" – 1:28
- "Endless Wire" – 1:51
- "We Got A Hit" – 1:18
- "They Made My Dream Come True" – 1:13
- "Mirror Door" – 4:16

=== Full album ===
The album Endless Wire included the mini-opera, but also other songs which to relate to the opera (*). Endless Wire was released 30 October 2006 in the UK and 31 October 2006 in the US The track listing includes:

- "Fragments"* (Townshend, Lawrence Ball) – 3:58
- "A Man in a Purple Dress" – 4:14
- "Mike Post Theme" – 4:28
- "In the Ether"* – 3:35
- "Black Widow's Eyes" – 3:07
- "Two Thousand Years" – 2:50
- "God Speaks of Marty Robbins"* – 3:26
- "It's Not Enough"* (Townshend, Rachel Fuller) – 4:02
- "You Stand by Me" – 1:36

The mini-opera:

- "Sound Round" – 1:21
- "Pick Up the Peace" – 1:28
- "Unholy Trinity" – 2:07
- "Trilby's Piano" – 2:04
- "Endless Wire" – 1:51
- "Fragments of Fragments" (Townshend, Ball) – 2:23
- "We Got a Hit" – 1:18
- "They Made My Dream Come True" – 1:13
- "Mirror Door" – 4:14
- "Tea & Theatre" – 3:24

=== Rock opera ===
Townshend continued working on the story as a full-length rock opera with the help of Steve Beskrone, John Hickok, Kevin Kuhn, Matt McGrath, John D. Putnam (a guitarist for the Tommy Broadway musical), Bree Sharp, drummer/percussionist David Van Tieghem, and John Patrick Walker. A rough version of The Boy Who Heard Music debuted 13 July 2007 as part of Vassar College's Powerhouse Summer Theater workshop series. The production was adapted and directed by Ethan Silverman and presented as a staged concert reading with minimal dialogue. The cast included John Hickok as Ray High, Jon Patrick Walker as Josh, Matt McGrath as Gabriel, and Bree Sharp as Leila. Songs in this adaptation included:

Act I

- "Prelude"
- "Pick Up the Peace" – Ray
- "In the Ether" – Josh, Ray
- "God Predicts Marty Robbins" – Gabriel, Ray
- "Unholy Trinity" – Gabriel, Josh, Leila
- "Trilby's Piano I" – Gabriel
- "I Can Fly" (by Rachel Fuller) – Leila
- "There's No Doubt" – Gabriel, Josh, Ray
- "Endless Wire Prelude" – Josh, Leila, Gabriel, Ray
- "Sound Round" – Ray and Company
- "Real Good Looking Boy" – Ray, Josh, Gabriel
- "Trilby's Piano II" – Trio
- "Fragments" – Company
- "Endless Wire" – Company

Act II

- "We Got a Hit" – Company
- "She Said He Said" – Gabriel, Leila
- "Uncertain Girl" – Josh
- "Heart Condition" – Leila
- "It's Not Enough" (by Pete Townshend and Rachel Fuller) – Gabriel, Josh, Leila
- "They Made My Dream Come True" – Ray
- "In the Ether" – Ray
- "Trilby's Piano III" – Gabriel, Josh, Leila
- "Mirror Door" – Company
- "Fragments" – Company
- "Tea & Theatre" – Ray, Josh, Leila

The song "Real Good Looking Boy" was previously issued on The Who's compilation album Then and Now. The song "I Can Fly" was previously issued on Fuller's EP Shine.
