= Real Good Looking Boy =

2004 song by Pete Townshend

Single by the Who

from the album Then and Now
- B-side: "Old Red Wine"
- Released: 2 May 2004
- Recorded: 2003–2004
- Genre: Rock
- Length: 5:42
- Label: Polydor (UK); MCA (US)
- Songwriters: Pete Townshend; Luigi Creatore; Hugo Peretti; George David Weiss
- Producer: Simon Townshend

The Who singles chronology
"It's Hard" (1982)	"Real Good Looking Boy" (2004)	"It's Not Enough" (2006)

"Real Good Looking Boy" is a song written by Pete Townshend, the guitarist of the English rock band the Who. It was originally released in 2004 on the compilation album Then and Now, and was one of two new songs on that album, the other being "Old Red Wine". Together, they were the first new songs released by the Who for 15 years. It was later released as an edited single backed with the aforementioned song. "Real Good Looking Boy" was later performed in the 2007 rock musical The Boy Who Heard Music. The song peaked at No. 28 on the Heritage rock chart. Bassist Greg Lake and drummer Zak Starkey, as well as keyboardist John "Rabbit" Bundrick played on this song.

== Lyrical meaning ==
The song was a tribute to Elvis Presley. During live performances, Roger Daltrey gives a short introduction to the song, describing it as a song about "a man that changed my life at the age of 11. I saw Elvis Presley live at 11. Thank God I did, I loved him because everybody under the age of 20 thought they were Elvis and dressed like him. Everybody over 20 hated him and that was good enough for me." The piano intro borrows from the Elvis song "Can't Help Falling in Love", and one of the later verses in "Real Good Looking Boy" uses lyrics from the first verse of the Elvis song.

The first part of the song is about Pete Townshend growing up and realizing that he was not a good looking boy, that he was not part of the cool good-looking group of boys his age and the trials, tribulations that everyone goes through in life. The second part is where the Elvis tribute comes into play and also where the song speaks of falling in love. The third part is where Townshend pays homage to finding true love and being made to feel like a "real good looking boy".

== Personnel ==
- Guitars, backing vocals: Pete Townshend
- Lead vocals: Roger Daltrey
- Bass guitar: Greg Lake
- Drums: Zak Starkey
- Piano: John "Rabbit" Bundrick
- Additional guitars and keyboards: Simon Townshend
- Producer: Simon Townshend at Eel Pie Oceanic Studios, London c. Nov. 2003
- Engineers: Bob Pridden and Myles Clarke

== "Old Red Wine" ==
"Old Red Wine" was written for the Who's former bassist John Entwistle, who died two years prior to the release of "Then and Now".

The riff at the end of the song predated the actual song by a few years, being played at the end of some versions of "My Generation" from the 2000 tour. The riff was also played in a performance of the same song during Entwistle's last show, at the Royal Albert Hall on 8 February 2002. Portions of the song were also played sometimes after "My Generation" on the band's 2002 (after Entwistle's death), 2004, 2006, 2007 and 2008 tours.

=== Personnel ===
- Guitars, piano, backing vocals: Pete Townshend
- Lead vocals: Roger Daltrey
- Bass guitar: Pino Palladino
- Drums: Zak Starkey
- Hammond organ and additional piano: John Bundrick
- Producer: Simon Townshend at Eel Pie Oceanic Studios, London c. Early 2004
- Engineers: Bob Pridden and Myles Clarke
