= Pie in the Sky =

Pie in the Sky may refer to:

- Pie in the Sky (TV series), a UK television series about a police officer turned restaurateur
- Pie in the Sky (1964 film), a 1964 American film
- Pie in the Sky (1996 film), a 1996 romantic comedy starring Josh Charles and Anne Heche
- "Pie in the Sky" (2 Stupid Dogs), a 1993 episode of 2 Stupid Dogs
- Pie in the Sky (game engine), a 3D video game engine and game creation system
- "Pie in the Sky", a song by The Supernaturals from the album It Doesn't Matter Anymore
- "Pie in the Sky", a song by Simon Townshend from the album Animal Soup
- A colloquialism for superior quadrantanopia, a visual field defect

== See also ==
- "The Preacher and the Slave", a song written by Joe Hill in 1911 (as a parody of the hymn "In the Sweet Bye and Bye"), in which he coined the phrase "pie in the sky"
