= Blind as a Bat =

Blind as a Bat may refer to:

- "Blind as a Bat" (Batman: The Animated Series), a 1993 episode of Batman: The Animated Series
- "Blind as a Bat" (song), written by Desmond Child and James Michael in the 2006 Meat Loaf album Bat Out of Hell III: The Monster Is Loose
- "Blind as a Bat", a song by Simon Townshend from his album Animal Soup
