= Giuseppe Creatore =

Italian-American bandmaster

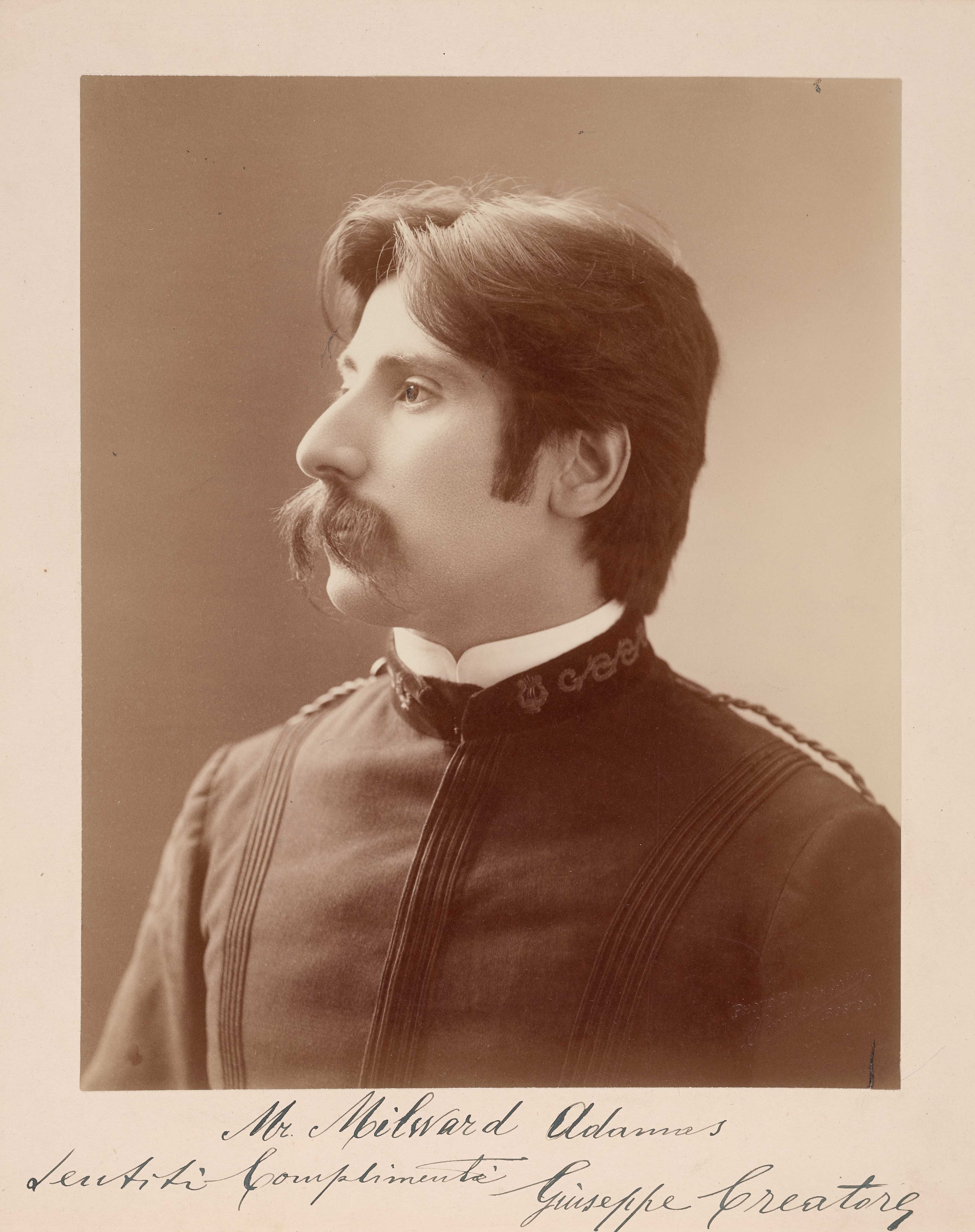
- Giuseppe Creatore (photo by Elmer Chickering; Newberry Library, Chicago)
- Born: June 21, 1871; Naples, Italy
- Died: August 15, 1952 (aged 81); New York, New York
- Education: Conservatorio di San Pietro a Majella
- Occupation: Bandmaster
- Children: 6, including Luigi Creatore
- Relatives: Hugo Peretti (nephew)

Giuseppe Creatore (/ˈkriːətɔːr/), called the Great Creatore, was an Italian bandmaster in Italy and the United States. He was born in Naples, Italy, on June 21, 1871, and died in New York City on August 15, 1952. Creatore's fame rivaled that of John Philip Sousa, and he was known for performances that were engaging for both their showmanship and musicianship. The music critic of the Kansas City Journal provides a colorful description of Creatore's stage presence: "Creatore starts the band in a mild, entreating way. A simple uplifting of the arms. Then suddenly, with a wild shake of his shaggy head, he springs across the stage with the ferocity of a wounded lion. Crash! Bang! And a grand volume of sound chocks the hall from pit to dome."

== Career ==
Creatore studied trombone and conducting with Nicola D'Arienzo and Camillo de Nardis at the Conservatorio di San Pietro a Majella. He wanted most of all to be a conductor, but was also an excellent trombonist. At the age of 14, Creatore performed on tour in European capital cities. In 1887, at the young age of 17, he accepted a position to direct the Naples Military Band. In 1899, Creatore left Italy for the United States to join Ellery's Royal Italian Band as a trombonist. When conductor Minoliti became ill, Creatore stepped up to fill his position. He became an instant celebrity, exciting audiences with his impassioned gestures that inspired the full musical potential from the band.

In 1901, Creatore formed his own band, built largely of dissatisfied members from Ellery's Royal Italian Band. From February to July they performed at the Atlantic City Steel Pier, and concluded the year with a 500-mile tour. Despite excellent reviews, Creatore was dissatisfied with the quality of the band, and in 1901 he went back to Naples, Italy to recruit new band members. He returned to the United States in 1902 with 60 high caliber, Italian musicians. Creatore's success gave rise to the wave of Italian band masters who immigrated to the United States in the early twentieth century, although none shared the same success as Creatore.

For the next several years, Creatore was booked solidly, with concerts priced at $5,000 per performance. Austerities of World War I and an increase in competition from other bands influenced the number of concert engagements. In 1917, Creatore formed an opera company that continued for 5 years, playing popular selections from Rigoletto, Aida, Carmen, Barber of Seville, among several others.

He recorded extensively, most notably for the Victor Talking Machine Company, but also for Edison Records, Paramount Records, and Columbia Records.

In 1931, he conducted a series of open air concerts for a symphony orchestra, and in 1937 conducted the New York State Symphonic Band and the New York Symphonic Orchestra in a succession of programs sponsored by the government Works Progress Administration. That position ended in 1940 after a disagreement ensued between Creatore and the WPA.

After a seven-year retirement, Creatore returned to the stage in 1947 to conduct a pop concert for the New York Symphonic Band on Randall Island. He died in 1952, leaving behind Rosina, his wife, and children: Tommaso and Peter (from an earlier marriage), Ezio, Carlo, Luigi, and Alba.

== In popular culture ==
Creatore is one of the bandleaders mentioned by "Professor" Harold Hill in the song "Seventy-Six Trombones" in the play and film The Music Man.
