= Two Thousand Years =

Two Thousand Years may refer to:

- Two Thousand Years (play), a 2005 play by Mike Leigh
- A song on the Endless Wire album by The Who
- A song on the River of Dreams album by Billy Joel
