= The Lifehouse Method =

The Lifehouse Method was an Internet site where applicants could sit for an electronic musical portrait made up from data they enter into the website. This website was the result of a collaboration between the Who's principal songwriter and composer Pete Townshend, composer Lawrence Ball and software developer Dave Snowdon. The website was operated by Eel Pie Recording Production, Limited, a company set up in 1970 by Pete Townshend.

== History ==
The Lifehouse Method grew out of Pete Townshend's unfinished 1971 science-fiction album Lifehouse, written for the Who. Although Townshend originally intended Lifehouse as a multi-media, audience-participation musical production to follow the Who's Tommy, difficulties in funding and implementing the project led to its release as the Who's album Who's Next instead. Although some of the key Lifehouse songs were left off Who's Next, the basic concept of the opus is still recognizable within the album.

In Lifehouse Townshend predicted a future wherein the population was forced inside by heavy pollution and connected in their homes to an internet-like "Grid" through which media moguls provided programmed entertainment. Rebels escape this situation and gather together to perform a live musical concert which generates a nirvana like state of universal unity.

Townshend hoped to link the audience in a way that would reflect the personalities of the audience members. To do this, he adapted VCS3 and ARP synthesizers and a quadraphonic PA to create a machine capable of generating and combining personal music themes written from computerized biographical data. He expected these thematic components would merge to form a "one note" or "universal chord" representing the audience, and by extrapolation, all of humanity.

Although the original project proved too ambitious for the technology available in 1971, Townshend revisited the Lifehouse concept in the Who's album Who Are You and in his concept album Psychoderelict. He continued discussion of these themes in his 2005 novella The Boy Who Heard Music, which in turn was the inspiration for the second half of the Who's Endless Wire, "Wire & Glass". "Wire & Glass" was developed into an unfinished musical workshopped at Vassar College, in addition to Townshend intended the story to become an animated film.

The Lifehouse Method website was discontinued in July 2008, having generated over 10,000 pieces of unique, customized music.

In January 2012 Method Music by Lawrence Ball, consisting of music created by Ball with assistance from Townshend using the Lifehouse Method, was released by Navona Records.

== Idea ==
The Lifehouse Method is software that will create a musical portrait. The applicants registered at the website and received a password which allowed them to create a composition.

The website musical team expected to choose some of these portraits for further development into larger compositions or songs that would be presented in a concert or concert series, with the applicant receiving a portion of any income generated. To date, no concert has been arranged.
