= Method Music =

Studio album by Lawrence Ball
- Released: 31 January 2012
- Recorded: Oceanic Studios (Twickenham UK)
- Genre: Electronic, Mediational, Ambient, Classical
- Length: 120:00
- Label: Navona Records
- Producer: Pete Townshend and Bob Lord

Method Music is a double-album of electronic music by the English composer and mathematician Lawrence Ball created using the compositional system that would become The Lifehouse Method, an online-based compositional project conceived by Pete Townshend of The Who to compose customized algorithmically-generated musical portraits. The album's music evolved from tests of the portraiture system.

The release was produced by Pete Townshend and Bob Lord and was released on 31 January 2012 on Navona Records.

== History ==
Method Music is an outgrowth of Townshend's groundbreaking 1971 futurist composition Lifehouse. Although Townshend originally intended Lifehouse as a multimedia audience-participation musical production to follow The Who's Tommy, difficulties in implementing the project led to its temporary abandonment; a selection of constituent components extracted from Lifehouse were recorded and assembled as The Who's highly successful album Who's Next.

The element of audience participation was a key plot point of the Lifehouse narrative, which culminates in a concert where the audience's personal attributes and characteristics are transformed into music. The idea of a musical portraiture system was first explored by Townshend in the lead-off cut on Who's Next, Baba O'Riley - a piece echoed in Meher Baba Piece, the first track on Method Music (which was included on The Who's 2006 album Endless Wire as the underpinning for Fragments, co-written by Ball).

In 2007, Townshend launched The Lifehouse Method website, run by his company Eel Pie, an online music portraiture system created with Ball and programmer Dave Snowdon in which users entered data into the system and received a unique, customized piece of audio. The website generated over 10,000 musical portraits before closing in 2008.

Method Music was recorded and mixed at Townshend's Oceanic Studios in Twickenham.

== Track listing ==
Disc One

1. "Meher Baba Piece"
2. "Sitter 09"
3. "Sitter 10"
4. "Victoria 5"
5. "Sitter 11"
6. "Sitter 12"
7. "Sitter 13"
8. "Sitter 14"
9. "Sitter 15"
10. "Sitter 17"
11. "Sitter 16"

Disc Two

1. "Galaxy 01 (for the late Syd Barrett)"
2. "Galaxy 02 (for the late Hugh Hopper)"
3. "Galaxy 03 (for the late György Ligeti)"
