= I'm the Answer =

Single by Simon Townshend

from the album Sweet Sound
- Released: 1983 and 1984
- Recorded: 1982–1983
- Genre: Rock; pop rock
- Length: 4:54
- Label: Polydor
- Songwriter: Simon Townshend
- Producer: Pete Townshend

Simon Townshend singles chronology
"Another Planet" (1980)	"I'm the Answer" (1983)	"So Real" (1983)

"'I'm the Answer'" is a song by Simon Townshend, the younger brother of the Who's guitarist Pete Townshend, originally released in 1983. The song is the second track and the first single from Simon Townshend's debut solo album, Sweet Sound.

"I'm the Answer" features Pete Townshend singing backing vocals. There were two singles lifted from the album, "So Real" and "I'm the Answer", but neither got much album-oriented rock radio play. "I'm the Answer" was the only song to feature a music video, which was played on MTV being added to rotation in November 1983. Simon Townshend was interviewed with Pete Townshend about the album. MTV mistakenly credited "Peter Townshend" as the artist for the song.

== 12" release ==
The 12" version of the single was released in 1984. It features the full length version of "I'm the Answer" and the rare non-album track "Into the Memory", as well as "Heart Stops", the closing track from Sweet Sound.

== Other releases ==
Simon Townshend re-recorded the song for the 1999 album Animal Soup.

== Personnel ==
- Simon Townshend - Lead vocals, Lead guitar

Additional personnel

- Steve Barnacle - Bass guitar
- Mark Brzezicki - Drums
- Pete Townshend - Backing vocals

Engineering

- Bill Price - Engineer
