= Maggie Flynn =

1968 musical by Morton DaCosta

- Music: Hugo Peretti; Luigi Creatore; George David Weiss
- Lyrics: Hugo Peretti; Luigi Creatore; George David Weiss
- Book: Morton DaCosta
- Basis: The New York Draft Riots
- Productions: 1968 Broadway

Maggie Flynn is a 1968 musical with a book by Morton DaCosta and music and lyrics by Hugo Peretti, Luigi Creatore, and George David Weiss.

Based on an idea by John Flaxman, it was inspired by a true story set in the New York City draft riots of 1863. The title character, an Irish woman providing asylum for orphaned children of refugee slaves, is on the verge of marrying a Union Army colonel. Her vagabond husband Phineas Flynn (who abandoned her to pursue a theatrical career and whom she had presumed was dead) returns to the scene. The cast of characters includes Confederate insurgents, prostitutes and drunks, bigoted socialites, circus performers, and some African-American children endangered by the draft riots.

== Production ==
The Broadway production, directed by DaCosta and choreographed by Brian Macdonald, opened on October 23, 1968, at the ANTA Playhouse, where it ran for 82 performances and 6 previews. The cast included Shirley Jones and husband Jack Cassidy, who was nominated for the Tony Award for Best Actor in a Musical, and Robert Kaye as Col. John Farraday. Among the orphans were newcomers Irene Cara, Giancarlo Esposito, and Stephanie Mills.

Critics found the basic situation of Jones and the children threatened by political unrest to be too similar to The Sound of Music, albeit told in an unrelentingly darker manner. They thought that efforts to equate the New York Draft Riots with contemporary protests against the Vietnam War were heavy-handed and counter-productive. "It is worth noting that two of the first night critics came up with the same line, calling Maggie Flynn the best Broadway musical since Her First Roman — thereby honoring a desperately lousy mishmash that opened three days earlier."

An original cast recording was released by RCA Victor and re-released on CD by DRG in 2009.

== Plot ==
During the American Civil War, Maggie Flynn, a young Irish woman living in New York City, marries Phineas, a charming scoundrel who leaves her to join the circus. Maggie runs an orphanage for black orphans, and soon is engaged to Colonel John Farraday, a steady and faithful beau. However, Phineas, now called "The Clown," returns to win back his wife. They become caught up in the New York Draft Riots of 1863, and the orphanage is burned down.

== Songs ==
Act I

- Never Gonna Make Me Fight
- It's a Nice Cold Morning
- I Wouldn't Have You Any Other Way
- Learn How to Laugh
- Maggie Flynn
- The Thank You Song
- Look Around Your Little World
- Maggie Flynn (Reprise)
- I Won't Let It Happen Again
- How About a Ball?
- Pitter Patter
- I Won't Let It Happen Again (Reprise)

Act II

- Never Gonna Make Me Fight (Reprise)
- Why Can't I Walk Away?
- The Game of War
- Mr. Clown
- Pitter Patter (Reprise)
- The Riot
- Don't You Think It's Very Nice?
- Mr. Clown (Reprise)
- Maggie Flynn (Reprise)

== Award nomination ==
- 1969 Tony Award for Best Actor in a Musical - Jack Cassidy
