= The Seeker (The Who song) =

- Scandinavian picture sleeve

Single by the Who
- B-side: "Here for More"
- Released: 20 March 1970
- Recorded: January 1970
- Studio: IBC, London
- Genre: Hard rock; power pop
- Length: 3:12
- Label: Track (UK); Decca (US)
- Songwriter: Pete Townshend
- Producers: Kit Lambert; The Who

The Who UK singles chronology
"Pinball Wizard" (1969)	"The Seeker" (1970)	"Summertime Blues" (1970)

The Who US singles chronology
"I'm Free" (1969)	"The Seeker" (1970)	"Summertime Blues" (1970)

Official audio
- "The Seeker" - BBC Session on YouTube

"The Seeker" is a song written by Pete Townshend and performed by the English rock band the Who. First released as a non-album single in March 1970, it is included on their 1971 compilation album Meaty Beaty Big and Bouncy and other compilations.

== Background ==
Around the time of the song's release, Townshend explained its meaning in an interview with Rolling Stone:

Quite loosely, "The Seeker" was just a thing about what I call Divine Desperation, or just Desperation. And what it does to people. It just kind of covers a whole area where the guy's being fantastically tough and ruthlessly nasty and he's being incredibly selfish and he's hurting people, wrecking people's homes, abusing his heroes, he's accusing everyone of doing nothing for him and yet at the same time he's making a fairly valid statement, he's getting nowhere, he's doing nothing and the only thing he really can't be sure of is his death, and that at least dead, he's going to get what he wants. He thinks!

"I suppose I like this least of all the stuff", wrote Townshend the following year. "It suffered from being the first thing we did after Tommy, and also from being recorded a few too many times. We did it once at my home studio, then at IBC where we normally worked then with Kit Lambert producing. Then Kit had a tooth pulled, breaking his jaw, and we did it ourselves. The results are impressive. It sounded great in the mosquito-ridden swamp I made it up in—Florida at three in the morning drunk out of my brain with Tom Wright and John Wolff. But that's always where the trouble starts, in the swamp. The alligator turned into an elephant and finally stampeded itself to death on stages around England. I don't think we even got to play it in the States." However, the Who performed "The Seeker" for about two weeks on their 1970 American tour. The Who revived the song briefly in 2000 and then extensively starting on the 2006–2007 tour for Endless Wire.

The lyrics name-check several people who had high profiles in contemporary pop culture: musicians Bob Dylan (as "Bobby Dylan") and the Beatles, and advocate of psychedelic drugs Timothy Leary. Townshend was a devotee of the teachings of Meher Baba, a Persian-Indian mystic whose 1966 treatise/pamphlet God in a Pill? famously lambasted drug use as a means of consciousness expansion. Similarly, Townshend was an opponent of drug abuse throughout this period.

Nicky Hopkins plays piano on "The Seeker".

== Release ==
Released in the UK as Track 604036 on 21 March 1970, "The Seeker" reached number 19 in the charts. Released in the US as Decca 7-32670, it hit the Billboard charts on 11 April 1970, eventually peaking at number 44. The B-side, "Here for More", is one of the few Who songs written by lead singer Roger Daltrey.

Cash Box described it as showing "the Who still operating with blistering instrumental thrust, but turning to lyrics more meaningful than before." Record World said that the single "was worth the wait and the group is still a real powerhouse".

The song figured prominently in the Steven Soderbergh film The Limey starring Terence Stamp.

== Charts ==
Chart (1970)	Peak position
Canadian RPM Top Singles	21
UK Singles Chart	19
U.S. Billboard Hot 100	44
German Singles Chart	18
Austrian Singles Chart	15
Dutch Singles Chart	15
Belgian (Wallonia) Singles Chart	29
