= Moving Target (Simon Townshend album) =

Studio album by Moving Target
- Released: 1985
- Recorded: During 1984 to 1985
- Genre: Rock, new wave, pop rock
- Length: 41:38
- Label: Polydor (US); 21 Records (UK)
- Producer: Neil Kernon

Moving Target chronology
Sweet Sound (1983)	Moving Target (1985)	Among Us (1996)

Singles from Moving Target
- 1. "Barriers" Released: 1985; 2. "Meet You" Released: 1985

Professional ratings
Review scores
Source	Rating
Allmusic	3/5 stars

Moving Target is the début album by the band Moving Target, headed by frontman Simon Townshend, the younger brother of The Who's guitarist Pete Townshend. The album, released by the label Polydor Records in 1985, Moving Target was Moving Target's only release, and was a commercial failure. It also marked the end of the career for the band, but is often counted among Townshend's discography, sometimes credited as a solo effort (since the band Moving Target formed and disbanded around this single effort).

The album was produced by Neil Kernon, a Grammy Award-winning producer who has contributed to over 40 Gold and Platinum records. This album is one of three albums produced by Kernon in 1985.

The band "Moving Target" features Simon Townshend playing guitar, Andy Shillito playing bass guitar, Dane Morrell playing drums and Paul Rogers playing keyboards. The band once played live at the rock club The Ritz in New York City on which they played the tracks "Meet You", "Frustrated Hearts", "Addictions", and "Genuine" from this album as well as "I'm the Answer" from Sweet Sound and a new track "Broken Heart" which was not recorded until 1987 when it was released as a single. A second record was to have been released on the label Atlantic Records, but the label kept Simon Townshend busy remixing and re-recording under their contract, they never seemed pleased with the results. Once that the contract was over, Simon Townshend reformed "On the Air". only this time instead of Tony Butler, he recruited Andy Shilito, the bassist he had worked with on his earlier albums.

In 1988, Simon Townshend held a record release party for his first album as the band "On the Air". They performed most of the new tracks in a London club before an audience that included his Mother, Pete Townshend, Martin Chambers of The Pretenders, and many others. The party was a great success. However, the next day a legal injunction was slapped on the album and it could not be released. Some copies of the single are around.

== Track listing ==
All tracks written by Simon Townshend.

Side one

No.	Title	Length
1.	"Meet You"	3:37
2.	"Barriers"	4:31
3.	"Cats Away"	3:43
4.	"Sorry"	4:32
5.	"Price to Pay"	3:37

Side two

No.	Title	Length
1.	"Believe in You"	4:37
2.	"Addiction"	4:49
3.	"Moving Target"	4:04
4.	"Frustrated Hearts"	3:36
5.	"Genuine"	4:32

== Non-album track ==
- House on Fire (The B- side for the single "Barriers")

== Personnel ==
- Simon Townshend - Lead vocals, guitar
- Andy Shillito - Bass Guitar, backing vocals
- Dane Morrell - Drums, percussion
- Paul Rogers - Keyboards

Production

- Neil Kernon - Record producer

Engineering

- Mark Corbijn - Engineer [Assistant]
- John Luongo - Remixing
- Simon Townshend - Programming
