= In the Attic (webcast) =

In the Attic was a live weekly webcast from Pete Townshend's Oceanic studios in London hosted by British singer-songwriters Rachel Fuller and Mikey Cuthbert. This lively show features regular guest appearances by Pete Townshend, Simon Townshend and Jerry Hall. The shows feature musical numbers, short films and other special guests. In the Attic began in October 2005 as a way to entertain Fuller's devoted web fans. It has gained a steady following on the internet as it attracts a blend of fans, mainly those of Rachel Fuller, The Who, Pete Townshend's solo work, and Simon Townshend's band, 'The Casbah Club'.

== Current news and future plans ==
Rachel Fuller and ITA toured with Townshend's band The Who for the duration of the 2006–2007 Who world tour. Documentary filmmaker Justin Kreutzmann headed the In the Attic camera crew as an electronic news gatherer filming any backstage antics and local flavor that Rachel Fuller and The Who deem fit to show on their respective websites, eventually creating a long form DVD documentary of the entire tour due out in 2007.

Following ITA's tour of Europe, 'Attic Intravision' was set up to showcase both Series One and Series Two of the show and to coincide with The Who's world tour.

== Sandi Thom controversy ==
In the Attic pre-dates the emergence of Scottish singer songwriter Sandi Thom's copycat show From the Basement (later changed to 21 Nights in Tooting) by nearly six months. There are many in the UK entertainment industry, including Pete Townshend, who feel that Thom's publicist lifted Rachel Fuller's concept and inflated the web statistics to hype Thom's image. Some critics accused Sony of orchestrating the campaign. Craig Logan, the managing director of RCA, denied these accusations, claiming that the label was "drawn to" Thom after hearing of the webcasting. Fuller has given a standing invitation to Sandi Thom should she ever want to appear on ITA.

== Cast ==
- Rachel Fuller – Co-Host
- Mikey Cuthbert – Co-Host

== Regulars ==
- Pete Townshend
- Simon Townshend

== Other appearances ==
- Adele
- Foy Vance
- Regina Spektor
- The Flaming Lips
- Roger Daltrey
- The Kooks
- The Fratellis
- Razorlight
- Rose Hill Drive
- The Zutons
- Editors
- Martha Wainwright
- The Raconteurs
- Rachael Yamagata
- Sean Lennon
- Wolfmother
- Death Cab for Cutie
- The Magic Numbers
