= Mikey Cuthbert =

English singer-songwriter (born 1972)

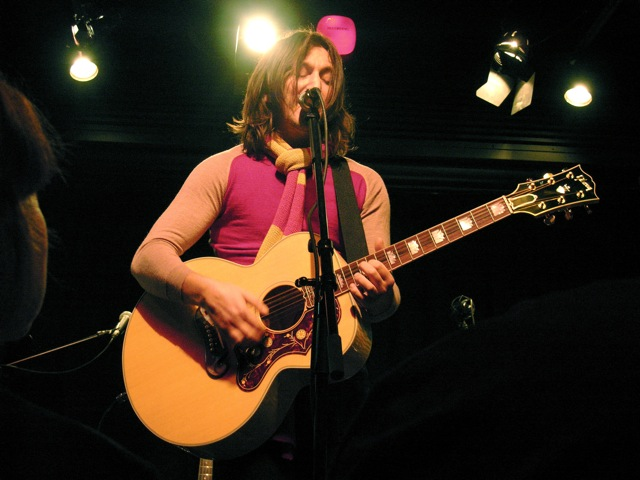
Mikey Cuthbert at concert, 2005

Mikey Cuthbert (born July 1972) is an English singer-songwriter based in Essex. Cuthbert's work is published by Eel Pie Recording Production Limited, Pete Townshend's publishing company.

Born in Southend-on-Sea, Cuthbert is self-taught and has been writing songs for most of his life. His music is guitar based acoustic indie pop.

He co-hosted the cult hit and real time internet show In The Attic with Rachel Fuller and regular special guest Pete Townshend of The Who. The show included live music, conversation and guest appearances from established musicians and celebrities. In The Attic toured across Europe and the United States with The Who during their 2006–2007 world tour, webcasting live by satelitte from their 32-foot shiny airstream. In The Attic brought out its own live album (available on iTunes) which includes music from Cuthbert, Foy Vance, Pete Townshend, The Kooks, The Magic Numbers, The Flaming Lips and Razorlight.
