= Luigi Creatore =

American songwriter and record producer (1921–2015)

Luigi Federico Creatore
- Born: December 21, 1921; New York City, United States
- Died: December 13, 2015 (aged 93); Boca Raton, Florida, United States
- Father: Giuseppe Creatore
- Relatives: Hugo Peretti (cousin)
- Military career
- Allegiance: United States
- Conflicts: World War II

Luigi Federico Creatore (December 21, 1921 – December 13, 2015) was an American songwriter and record producer.

== Early life ==
Creatore was born in New York City in 1921, the son of noted Italian-born bandleader and composer Giuseppe Creatore.

== Career ==
After serving with the United States military during World War II, in the 1950s he became a writer then partnered with his cousin, Hugo Peretti to form the songwriting team of Hugo & Luigi, which also produced other records.

In 1957, they bought into Roulette Records where they both wrote songs for various artists such as Valerie Carr, and produced major hits for Jimmie Rodgers, including "Honeycomb" (Billboard #1), "Kisses Sweeter Than Wine" (Billboard #3), and "Oh-Oh, I'm Falling in Love Again" and "Secretly".

Two years later, Creatore and Peretti signed a deal with RCA Victor where they produced pop crooner and NBC television personality Perry Como. In addition, they produced several other RCA Victor recording artists, including Sam Cooke and Ray Peterson and wrote English lyrics for the song "The Lion Sleeps Tonight" (with the original bulk of the song written by Solomon Linda), producing the hit single for The Tokens. With George David Weiss they co-wrote "Can't Help Falling in Love" for Elvis Presley. Peretti and Creatore also wrote the Presley film theme "Wild in the Country". He and Peretti left RCA Victor in 1964 to join Weiss in writing a musical about the American Civil War. Titled Maggie Flynn (starring Shirley Jones) it briefly ran on Broadway in 1968.

In the 1970s, Creatore and Peretti owned part of Avco Records and then established H&L Records, which they operated until retiring at the end of the decade. Among their successes were recordings by The Stylistics and The Softones. They also won the 1977 Grammy Award for Best Musical Show Album as producers for Bubbling Brown Sugar.

His play An Error of the Moon, a speculative exploration of the relationship between the actor Edwin Booth and his brother John Wilkes Booth, directed by Kim Weild, was performed off-Broadway until October 10, 2010.

== Death ==
Creatore died from complications of pneumonia on December 13, 2015, at age 93 in Boca Raton, Florida.
