= Endless Wire (The Who album) =

Studio album by the Who
- Released: 30 October 2006
- Recorded: December 2004 – May 2006
- Studios: Pete Townshend's home studio and Eel Pie Oceanic Studios
- Genre: Rock
- Length: 52:35
- Labels: Polydor; Universal Republic
- Producers: Pete Townshend, with (for Roger Daltrey's vocals only) Bob Pridden and Billy Nicholls

The Who chronology
Wire & Glass (2006)	Endless Wire (2006)	Live from Toronto (2006)

Singles from Endless Wire
- 1. "Mirror Door" Released: June 2006; 2. "Wire & Glass" Released: 17 July 2006; 3. "Tea & Theatre" Released: 2006; 4. "It's Not Enough" Released: 2006; 5. "Black Widow's Eyes" Released: 2006

Professional ratings
Aggregate scores
Source	Rating
Metacritic	64/100
Review scores
Source	Rating
About.com	4/5 stars
AllMusic	3.5/5 stars
The Encyclopedia of Popular Music	3/5 stars
The Guardian	3/5 stars
Mojo	4/5 stars
MSN Music (Consumer Guide)	C
Pitchfork	4.7/10
PopMatters	3.5/5 stars
Rolling Stone	4/5 stars
Spin	3.5/5 stars
Uncut	3/5 stars

Endless Wire is the eleventh studio album by the English rock band the Who, released on 30 October 2006 in the UK through Polydor Records and the following day in the US by Universal Republic. It was their first new studio album of original material in 24 years following the release of It's Hard in 1982, as well as their first since the death of their founding bassist John Entwistle. It was originally due to be released in early 2005 under the working title WHO2.

Endless Wire received generally positive reviews from music critics. It debuted at No. 7 on the Billboard album chart and No. 9 in the UK. Portions of it were featured on The Who Tour 2006-2007. Most of the songs from this album were used in the rock musical adaptation of The Boy Who Heard Music which debuted in July 2007 as part of Vassar College's Powerhouse Summer Theater workshop series.

== History and composition ==
Most of what is known about the development of the album has come from Pete Townshend's website. On 21 March 2005, Pete Townshend announced the postponement of the new Who album. On 24 December 2005, Townshend announced that manager Bill Curbishley had introduced a "great scheme" to allow the band to tour in mid-2006 in support of new material, even if Townshend did not have "a full thirty tracks ready to go." On 20 March 2006, Daltrey announced that he and Townshend were making progress with the album and that Townshend had written a song about Stockholm syndrome, titled "Black Widow's Eyes". Daltrey also said that Townshend was playing some bass on the album.

On 28 March 2006, Townshend announced through the diary portion of his website that a mini-opera, titled "The Glass Household", now formed the core of the album. It is based on his novella The Boy Who Heard Music. He also announced plans to have a shortened version of the opera released prior to the release of the full album. This diary entry also confirmed the line-up of the band: Pino Palladino on bass, Pete Townshend on guitars, his brother Simon Townshend on backing vocals, and John "Rabbit" Bundrick on keyboards. Peter Huntington, from Rachel Fuller's band, was on drums because Zak Starkey was touring with Oasis.

On 9 April 2006, Townshend announced that the shortened version of "The Glass Household" had been played to executives at Polydor, and a release date had been set for June, with a tour of Europe following, and the album in September. On 3 May 2006, Pete Townshend posted on his diary page that the mastering for the new EP, titled Wire & Glass, was complete and that the tracks would soon be sent to Polydor. Townshend anticipated a mid-June release for the EP, and a mid-September release for the full album. He had also announced that the Who would begin rehearsing for their tour, during which time Townshend would finish recording the rest of the album with Roger Daltrey.

A version of "It's Not Enough" was released online at artistdirect.com. "It's Not Enough" had tentatively been announced as the first single off the album, to be released simultaneously.

On 3 October 2006, "It's Not Enough" was made available on iTunes. "Tea & Theatre" was also made available. Then on 14 October 2006, Polydor built a website for the album, endlesswire.co.uk, on which samples of the songs "We Got a Hit", "Endless Wire", "It's Not Enough", "Black Widow's Eyes", "Mike Post Theme", and "Man in a Purple Dress" were made available to listen to, but not to download. As of 23 October 2006, the entire album was available to stream on music.aol.com.

"Mike Post Theme" alludes to the ubiquity of Mike Post's work in television theme music.

Endless Wire debuted at No. 7 on the Billboard 200, selling about 81,000 units in its first week of release.

== Additional songs ==
In addition to the 19 tracks listed below, three songs were either considered for inclusion on the album or reportedly recorded for the album but were left off:

- "Ambition"

Reportedly written in 1971 for the Lifehouse concept, Townshend debuted this song on In the Attic in 2006.

- "Uncertain Girl"

Another song that was debuted by Townshend on In the Attic in 2006. It was recorded in the studio with Zak Starkey on drums, and Daltrey on vocals, but Townshend expressed doubt on whether it would make it on the album or not when he first played it on in the Attic, and it was not included. However, it did make an appearance in the Vassar College workshop performance of the rock musical The Boy Who Heard Music.

- "How Can I Help You, Sir?"

On 18 December 2005, Pete Townshend posted a diary entry that chronicled the recording of this track:

Here is a film I made of a working day developing a demo of a song for the next Who album called "How Can I Help You, Sir?" I have played this in raw form on Rachel Fuller's IN THE ATTIC and last night on her Pay For View Christmas Special. That is the way it sounds played acoustic. What you can hear here is the way it is beginning to evolve as a rock track. Adding Roger's voice will increase the edge. In a very real sense every song I write when I sit at home with an acoustic guitar has two distinct lives. The acoustic version may seem to be softer and more intimate. But in this case — in a song about a sick person's refusal to allow anyone to help them, a lonely person refusing to allow anyone to get close — the acoustic version has more bite. The rock version seems altogether more jolly, almost a throwaway. It will be interesting to see how it sounds when Roger and I get it into the studio together.

The video can be downloaded from Townshend's site. In 2015 the track was released on Townshend's solo compilation Truancy.

== Adaptation as a rock musical ==
Townshend also worked the songs from this album into a full-length rock musical, a rough version of which debuted 13 July 2007 as part of Vassar College's Powerhouse Summer Theater workshop series. The production was adapted and directed by Ethan Silverman and presented as a staged concert reading with minimal dialogue. The cast included John Hickok as Ray High, Jon Patrick Walker as Josh, Matt McGrath as Gabriel, and Bree Sharp as Leila. Songs in this adaptation included:

Act I

- "Prelude"
- "Pick Up the Peace" – Ray
- "In the Ether" – Josh, Ray
- "God Predicts Marty Robbins" – Gabriel, Ray
- "Unholy Trinity" – Gabriel, Josh, Leila
- "Trilby's Piano I" – Gabriel
- "I Can Fly" (Fuller) – Leila
- "There's No Doubt" – Gabriel, Josh, Ray
- "Endless Wire Prelude" – Josh, Leila, Gabriel, Ray
- "Sound Round" – Ray and Company
- "Real Good Looking Boy" – Ray, Josh, Gabriel
- "Trilby's Piano II" – Trio
- "Fragments" – Company
- "Endless Wire" – Company

Act II

- "We Got a Hit" – Company
- "She Said He Said" – Gabriel, Leila
- "Uncertain Girl" – Josh
- "Heart Condition" – Leila
- "It's Not Enough" (Townshend/Fuller) – Gabriel, Josh, Leila
- "They Made My Dream Come True" – Ray
- "In the Ether" – Ray
- "Trilby's Piano III" – Gabriel, Josh, Leila
- "Mirror Door" – Company
- "Fragments" – Company
- "Tea & Theatre" – Ray, Josh, Leila

The song "Real Good Looking Boy" was previously issued on the Who's compilation album Then and Now. The song "I Can Fly" was previously issued on Fuller's EP Shine.

== Track listing ==
All songs written by Pete Townshend except where noted.

Endless Wire track listing
No.	Title	Writer(s)	Length
1.	"Fragments"	Townshend, Lawrence Ball	3:58
2.	"A Man in a Purple Dress"		4:14
3.	"Mike Post Theme"		4:28
4.	"In the Ether"		3:35
5.	"Black Widow's Eyes"		3:07
6.	"Two Thousand Years"		2:50
7.	"God Speaks of Marty Robbins"		3:26
8.	"It's Not Enough"	Townshend, Rachel Fuller	4:02
9.	"You Stand by Me"		1:36

Wire & Glass: A Mini-Opera
No.	Title	Writer(s)	Length
10.	"Sound Round"		1:21
11.	"Pick Up the Peace"		1:28
12.	"Unholy Trinity"		2:07
13.	"Trilby's Piano"		2:04
14.	"Endless Wire"		1:51
15.	"Fragments of Fragments"	Townshend, Ball	2:23
16.	"We Got a Hit"		1:18
17.	"They Made My Dream Come True"		1:13
18.	"Mirror Door"		4:14
19.	"Tea & Theatre"		3:24

Bonus tracks on some editions
No.	Title	Length
20.	"We Got a Hit" (extended)	3:03
21.	"Endless Wire" (extended)	3:03

=== Compact Disc edition of The Who Live at Lyon ===
Recorded at the Théâtre Antique, Vienne, Isère, France (near Lyon) on 17 July 2006. Included as an extra in Europe, Asia, and at Best Buy stores in the US.

No.	Title	Length
1.	"The Seeker"	2:36
2.	"Who Are You"	6:58
3.	"Mike Post Theme"	3:55
4.	"The Relay"	7:40
5.	"Greyhound Girl"	3:04
6.	"Naked Eye"	8:26
7.	"Won't Get Fooled Again"/"Old Red Wine"	10:40

=== DVD edition of The Who Live at Lyon ===
1. "I Can't Explain" – 3:04
2. "Behind Blue Eyes" – 4:39
3. "Mike Post Theme" – 3:41
4. "Baba O'Riley" – 5:59
5. "Won't Get Fooled Again" – 10:03

== Personnel ==
=== The Who ===
- Roger Daltrey – lead vocals (1–3, 5–6, 8, 10–12, 16, 18–19)
- Pete Townshend – guitars, lead vocals (4, 7, 9, 13–15, 17), backing vocals, bass guitar, drums, piano, keyboards, violin, banjo, mandolin, drum machine

=== Additional musicians ===
- Peter Huntington – drums (8, 10–11, 14, 16–18)
- Zak Starkey – drums (5)
- Pino Palladino – bass guitar (10–11, 14, 16–18)
- Stuart Ross – bass guitar (8)
- John "Rabbit" Bundrick – Hammond organ (10–11, 18)
- Simon Townshend – backing vocals (10–11, 14)
- Billy Nicholls – backing vocals (10–11, 14)
- Lawrence Ball – electronic music (1, 15)
- Rachel Fuller – keyboards (8), orchestration supervisor (13)
- Gill Morley – violin on (13)
- Brian Wright – violin (13)
- Ellen Blair – viola (13)
- Vicky Matthews – cello (13)
- Jolyon Dixon – acoustic guitar (8)

=== Design ===
- Richard Evans – Design and art direction utilising elements created with the Visual Harmony software designed by Dave Snowdon and Lawrence Ball.

== Charts ==
Chart performance for Endless Wire
Chart (2006)	Peak position
Australian Albums (ARIA)	63
Austrian Albums (Ö3 Austria)	28
Belgian Albums (Ultratop Flanders)	81
Belgian Albums (Ultratop Wallonia)	60
Dutch Albums (Album Top 100)	77
French Albums (SNEP)	62
German Albums (Offizielle Top 100)	34
Irish Albums (IRMA)	52
Italian Albums (FIMI)	36
Norwegian Albums (VG-lista)	23
Spanish Albums (Promusicae)	57
Swiss Albums (Schweizer Hitparade)	51
UK Albums (OCC)	9
US Billboard 200	7

"It's Not Enough" reached number 37 on the US Billboard Mainstream Rock Tracks chart, where it was released as a B-side with "Black Widow's Eyes".

== Certifications ==
Certifications for Endless Wire
Region	Certification	Certified units/sales
United Kingdom (BPI)	Gold	100,000^{^}
^{^} Shipments figures based on certification alone.
