= Animal Soup =

Studio album by Simon Townshend
- Released: March 1999
- Recorded: Woodgrange, London (Except tracks 3, 6 and 11 - recorded and produced by Andy Kravitz at The Amazing Barn, Philadelphia
- Genre: Rock, Pop rock
- Language: English
- Label: Stir Music
- Producer: Simon Townshend; Andy Kravitz

Simon Townshend chronology
| Among Us (1996) | Animal Soup (1999) | Bare Bodies Bare Assets (2000) |

Animal Soup is an album by Simon Townshend, the younger brother of The Who's guitarist Pete Townshend. The album was released in March 1999 and features Ben Townshend, Phil Spalding, James Hayto, Tony Lowe, Linz King among others.

The song "Blind As A Bat" was a song that Simon Townshend wrote when he was Six years old. It surfaced when Simon Townshend was in the studio in Philadelphia, and producer Andy Kravitz asked him to sing something he hated.

== Track listings ==
| No. | Title | Length |
|---|---|---|
| 1. | "Somewhere Out There" | 5:02 |
| 2. | "Our Time" | 5:59 |
| 3. | "For the Money" | 3:24 |
| 4. | "Highness" | 5:57 |
| 5. | "I'm Alright" | 4:08 |
| 6. | "Blind as a Bat" | 4:36 |
| 7. | "Pie in the Sky" | 4:07 |
| 8. | "No Angel" | 6:14 |
| 9. | "Goodbye Everything" | 5:08 |
| 10. | "Until Tomorrow" | 4:42 |
| 11. | "I'm the Answer" | 3:38 |

== Personnel ==
- Simon Townshend - Lead vocals, Acoustic guitar, Electric guitars, Keyboards and Backing vocals
- Ben Townshend - Drums, Percussion and Backing vocals

Additional musicians

- Phil Spalding - Bass guitar, Slide guitar, Electric guitar, Wah-wah guitar and Backing vocals on tracks 4, 8, 9, and 10
- James Hayto - Lead guitar, Wah-wah guitar, Rhythm guitar, Electric guitar on tracks 1, 2, 3, 6, 9, and 11, and Bass guitar on tracks 3, 6, and 11
- Tony Lowe - Lead guitar on tracks 4 and 5
- Linz King - Acoustic guitar and Backing vocals on track 5
- Andy Kravitz - Drums on track 5
- Jackie Norrie - Fiddle on track 2
