= Peter Huntington =

British drummer

Peter Huntington (born 1973) is a British drummer for Rachel Fuller, and occasional drummer for her partner, Pete Townshend. Due to Zak Starkey's touring commitments with the band, Oasis, Huntington was the main drummer for The Who's first album in 24 years, Endless Wire. Huntington also completed the drumming on the expanded 2011 Quadrophenia box set. He has also played for Darren Hayes, formerly of Savage Garden.
