= Bubbling Brown Sugar (original Broadway cast recording) =

Bubbling Brown Sugar – Original Broadway Cast Recording

Cast recording by the original Broadway cast
- Released: 1976
- Label: H & L

Bubbling Brown Sugar, subtitled Original Broadway Cast Recording, is an album containing a recording of the 1976 musical review Bubbling Brown Sugar made by its original Broadway cast. The album was released in the same year by H & L Records.

== Background ==
The album was produced by Hugo & Luigi.

== Critical reception ==
Professional ratings
Review scores
Source	Rating
AllMusic	4.5/5 stars
Show Music	(no rating)

The Show Music magazine reviewed the album's Amherst reissue in 1986. The reviewer started by noting that the 1976 show presented "a wide-range of black music, from Ellington's 'Stompin' at the Savoy' and 'Take the 'A' Train,' to spirituals" and "was obstensibly a tour of Harlem's nightlife of the 1930's" and credited it for "kick[ing] off the late '70's fashion for black music revues (Ain't Misbehavin', Sophisticated Ladies, One Mo' Time, Eubie! and others)". He commended the cast for "put[ting] over their numbers with enthusiasm", but also said that he found "the performances [...] a bit anachronistic" and mentioned that he preferred "the more complete London cast recording, on two LPs."

== Track listing ==
LP – H & L Records HL-69011-698

Side 1
No.	Title	Note(s)	Length
1.	"Stompin' at the Savoy" / "Take the 'A' Train"	Band	2:15
2.	"Bubbling Brown Sugar"	Company	1:30
3.	"Nobody"	Avon Long	3:02
4.	"His Eye Is on the Sparrow" / "Swing Low Sweet Chariot"	Carolyn Byrd & Company	5:00
5.	"Sophisticated Lady"	Chip Garnett	2:50
6.	"Stormy Monday Blues"	Carolyn Byrd	1:30
7.	"In Honeysuckle Time, When Emaline Said She'd Be Mine"	Avon Long & Joseph Attles	1:15
8.	"Sweet Georgia Brown"	Vivian Reed	2:52

Side 2
No.	Title	Note(s)	Length
1.	"Honeysuckle Rose"	Josephine Premice & Avon Long	3:17
2.	"I Got It Bad"	Ethel Beatty	3:32
3.	"Harlem Makes Me Feel!"	Barry Preston	2:12
4.	"There'll Be Some Changes Made"	Josephine Premice	3:04
5.	"God Bless the Child"	Vivian Reed	3:20
6.	"It Don't Mean a Thing"	Finale	4:55

== Awards ==
Year	Award type	Categories	Results	Ref.
1977	Grammy Awards	Best Cast Show Album	Won	
