= Valerie Carr =

American singer

Valerie Carr (born 1936, New York City, United States) is an American singer, who is best known for her song "When the Boys Talk About the Girls."

== Career ==
Valerie Carr recorded for King Records in the mid-1950s before being signed by Roulette Records in 1958, where she remained until 1962. At Roulette, one of her 45 rpm recordings, "When The Boys Talk About The Girls", peaked on the 1958 Billboard chart at No. 19, and also reached the Top 40 in the UK Singles Chart. The B-side of the record was her cover of Toni Arden's only million-seller hit, "Padre". That song, a ballad of love lost, was also covered by Elvis Presley and is included on his 1973 album Elvis ("The Fool").

In 1959, Carr put out two LPs, Song Stylist Extraordinaire and Ev'ry Hour Ev'ry Day of My Life. In 1960, she recorded "Oh Gee" / "You Belong in Someone Else's Arms", the B-side written by Burt Bacharach and Bob Hilliard. Her 1961 single "I Left There Crying" made it into the US Top 50.

Carr was reportedly one of Buddy Holly's favorite singers.
