= Lawrence Ball =

- Born: 17 September 1951 (age 74)
- Genres: New-age; experimental; classical
- Occupations: Composer; musician
- Instruments: Electronics; piano
- Label: Various
- Website: lawrenceball.org

Lawrence Ball (born 17 September 1951) is an English musician and composer who lives in North London. He produces multi-media compositions, performs in concert, and also works as a private tutor in mathematics, music theory and physics.

== Musical career ==
Lawrence Ball was born in London and graduated from Queen Mary College, London University, with a BSc in Computer Science with Mathematics, then received a scholarship to Dulwich College from 1963 to 1969. He studied harmony and counterpoint with Robert Smith at the Guildhall School of Music from 1976 to 1977, piano with Tessa Uys from 1977 to 1978, and composition with composer Robert Boyle, an associate of Philip Glass, from 1978 to 1979.

Ball has performed live in Canada, the United States, France, Italy, Lithuania, Latvia, Germany, Switzerland and the UK He has accompanied the international painting group Collective Phenomena, performed with Sri Lankan singer Manickam Yogeswaran and Californian sarod player Lisa Sangita Moskow.

Ball has developed projects with healer Isobel McGilvray and worked with choreographers Sheila Styles and Rebecca Ham. He has composed for pianists Yonty Solomon and Tim Ravenscroft, violist Robin Ireland, The Smith Quartet, the Electric Symphony Orchestra and female vocal quartet Rosy Voices. He also composed music for the film The Eye of the Heart, a biography of the artist Cecil Collins. Other collaborations include work with Emily Burridge. In 1996 Ball founded the Planet Tree Music Festival, which he continues to direct, featuring in particular the composers Alan Hovhaness, Kaikhosru Sorabji and Jean Catoire.

In 2006 Ball worked with composer and songwriter Pete Townshend on recordings for The Who's album Endless Wire. From 2004 to 2007 Ball also collaborated with Townshend and Dave Snowdon to set up a project called The Lifehouse Method, an Internet site where applicants could "sit" for an electronic musical portrait made up from data they enter into the website.

In January 2012, Navona Records released Method Music, a double album consisting of music created by Ball with assistance from Townshend using the Lifehouse Method.

== Harmonic mathematics ==
A sample image generated by Lawrence Ball's harmonic maths.

Ball has an interest in algorithmically generated sound, music and visuals. He was inspired by John Whitney's pre-computer and computer generated films to begin work on a branch of mathematics called harmonic mathematics in 1984. With the initial help of Michael Tusch and James Larsson, this branch of mathematics was developed on the foundation of Whitney's differential dynamics and has been applied to graphic 3D visuals, sound timbres and melodic loops which evolved from the later 1980s.

Such compositions are similar to fractal and chaos sequences, but unlike fractals, are structured into time. With this input, Dave Snowdon developed a computer program in 1995 called Visual Harmony which produces graphics for live performance at musical events.

In the 1980s Ball developed a series of harmonic-math generated "timbral transforms" tones which produced compositions co-authored with Isobel McGilvray, and marketed as ShapeTapes. From 1984, many of Ball's scores feature harmonic maths processes that he created without computer programs. Pete Townshend's Method software uses harmonic maths exclusively in its generation. A technical explanation of harmonic maths and their use in music composition is available on Ball's website.

== Works ==
Lawrence Ball has collaborated with healers, therapists and counselors as well as writing for dance, film, popular music, orchestra and choir. His work is contemporary, related to minimalism and often considered New Age. His compositions often use the technique of looping and repetition pioneered in the musical innovations of Terry Riley and LaMonte Young. Other composers that Ball lists as influences include Erik Satie, Alan Hovhaness and Arvo Pärt. Ball has recorded over 2000 piano improvisations and other compositions. His works include:

- 1. Modal Largo (piano) (1976)
- 2. Modal Canon (piano) (1976)
- 3. A Prayer for the World's Breath (piano) (1977)
- 4. Chorale no. 4 (SATB choir) (wordless) (1978)
- 5. Chorale no. 5 (SATB choir) (words – Richard Valeriano) (1978)
- 6. Chorale no. 6 (SATB choir) (wordless) (1978)
- 7. Chorale no. 7 (SATB choir) (wordless) (1978)
- 8. Hymn of Peace & Dignity (TTBB choir) (words – Richard Valeriano) (1978)
- 9. Eyes (mezzo-soprano/piano) (words – Jeanine Miller) (1978)
- 10. Cathedral (mezzo-soprano or soprano/piano, plus version for mezzo or soprano/piano resonance) (words – Jeanine Miller) (1978)
- 11. Dance (SATB choir) (words – William Shakespeare) (1978)
- 12. Wind Quintet no, 1 (Fl, Ob, Cl, Bsn, Horn) (1978)
- 13. Prayer (any no of any instruments) indeterminate length (1978)
- 14. Breath of Bells (piano) (1978)
- 15. Be Still (SATB choir) (words – Richard Valeriano) (1978)
- 16. Consider (bass voice/piano) (words – Ron Wiidego) (1978)
- 17. Sky (piano) (1978)
- 18. Little Dance (flute) (1978)
- 19. Dream Waltz (flute) (1978)
- 20. Dream Waltz (flute/piano) (1978)
- 21. "What is an Atom?" (mezzo-soprano/tenor) (words – Ron Wildego) (1978)
- 22. Ocarina Dance (ocarina/Turkish saz or pair of single line melody instruments – modal or diatonic) (1979)
- 23. Behind Ail Words (SATB choir) (words – David Spangler) (1979)
- 24. Rainbow Window (SATB choir) (sung to the names of colours) (1979)
- 25. Hymn of Joy and Peace (SATB choir) (words – Richard Valeriano) (1979)
- 26. Wheel no. 1 (piano 4 hands) (1980)
- 27. The Winking of the Sunlight Gods (piano 4 hands) (1980)
- 28. Rose (soprano voice/flute) (words – Kathleen Raine) (1980)
- 29. Starmilk (piano) (1980)
- 30. Forever (mezzo-soprano or soprano/piano) (words Joan Hudson) (1980)
- 31. Scotland (cello) (1980)
- 32. The Stream (piano) (1981)
- 33. Time Springs (violin/piano) (1981)
- 33a. Time Springs (revised) (viola/piano) (1988)
- 34. Fortress 1 (violin/piano) (1981)
- 35. Celtic Dances (violin or viola/piano) (1981) 5 movements
- 36. Solo Viola Suite no. 1: Sacred Dance Melodies and Folk Hymns (viola) (1982) 6 movements
- 37. Song Cycle – Four Poems of Joan Hudson (soprano or mezzo-soprano/piano) (1982)
- 38. Song Cycle – Fiery Tears of Stars (baritone/piano) (words – Jeanine Miller, William Blake, Nicholas Roerich) (1983)
- 39. The Sun (SATB choir) (words – Ron Wildego) (1983)
- 40. Violet (mezzo-soprano/tenor/piano) (words – Jeanine Miller) (1983)
- 41. Levitation (TTBB choir) (words – Ron Wildego) (1983)
- 42. Chant (SATB choir) (wordless) (1983)
- 43. Firewheeldance for symphony orchestra (Vn, Vn, VI, Vc, B, 2 × FOCB, 2 horns, 2 trumpets, alto, tenor & bass trom) (1984)
- 44. Keyboard Study no. 1 (any keyboard) (1984)
- 45. Keyboard Study no. 2 (any keyboard) (1984)
- 46. Keyboard Study no. 3 (any keyboard) (1984)
- 47. Mobile, Serene, Whirl (oboe/piano) (1984) 3 movements
- 48. Meditation, Mobile, Dance (viola/piano) (1984) 3 movements
- 49. Fortress 2 (viola/piano) (1984)
- 50. Four Hands Keyboard Study (any keyboard) (1984)
- 51. Majesty, Waterfall (SSAA choir) (1984) 2 movements
- 52. Piece for Clarinet and Piano (1984) 4 movements
- 53. Piece for Flute & Piano (1984) 3 movements
- 54. Piano Bells 1 (piano) (1984)
- 55. Piano Suite no. 1 (1985) 3 movements
- 56. Mosaic for Two Violas (1985) 5 movements (1 movement)
- 57. Keyboard Study no. 4 (any keyboard) (1985)
- 58. Keyboard Study no. 5 (any keyboard) (1985)
- 59. Keyboard Study no. 7 (any keyboard) or more (variable length) (1985)
- 60. Keyboard Study no. 8 (any keyboard) (1985)
- 61. Fractal Study no. 1 (any keyboard) (1985)
- 62. Fractal Study no. 2 (any keyboard) (1985) (available as coloured score)
- 63. Fractal Study no. 3 (any keyboard) (1985) (available as coloured score)
- 64. Oboe/Viola Fractal Duo Study (1985)
- 65. Echoes of Coloured Holes Through Bright Spaces (Septet: vln, via, cello Oboe clar, pno, synth) 3 movements: a) Number Rays b) Nebulae c) Fiery Reel (1986) (1st and 2nd movements)
- 66. String Quartet no. 1: Crystals of Fire and Aether in 4 movements: a) Songs of Symmetry b) Lightheartdance c) Fiery Streams of Starlight d) Momentum Whirling (1986)
- 67. Piano Suite no. 2 (1986) in 2 movements: a) Dancing Patterns b) Riverlight
- 68. Mercury, Jupiter & Neptune (3 violas & oboe) (1987) in 3 movements (1st movement)
- 69. Viola Concerto* (jointly composed with Neil Davis) (viola + orch: vln, vln, vla, cl, bs; 2 × FOCB, 2 × trum, 2 × horn, timpani) (1987) in 3 movements (2nd and part of 3rd movements)
- 70. Viola Solo Study no. 1 (1988)
- 71. Viola Solo Study no. 2 (1988)
- 72. Keyboard Study no. 13 (any keyboard) (1989)
- 73. Keyboard Study no. 14 (any keyboard) (1989)
- 74. Harmonious Mirrors of the Air (soprano voice, oboe, clarinet) (wordless) 3 movements: a) Bell Ringing b) Love is Sunshine c) Silence (1990)
- 75. Joyful Dances and Peaceful Presences (quintet: soprano, mezzo-soprano oboe viola, cello) (wordless) 4 movements 40m (1990) (2nd movement)
- 76. Solo Viola Suite no 2 (1990) in 4 movements H2nd movement)
- 77. A Factory of Peace (mezzo-soprano/piano) (words – Mary Webb) (1990)
- 78. Hovering Sound (SATB choir) (wordless) (1990)
- 79. Colour Words (solo soprano voice) words – the names of colours (1990) 7 sections
- 80. Dream Procession no. 1 (oboe, viola,'cello)(1993)
- 81. FireWheelDance no. 6 (oboe, viola, 'cello) (1993)
- 82. Seascape Murmuring (oboe, viola, 'cello) (1993)
- 83. The Pixie (oboe, viola, 'cello) (1993)(80 – 83 form a Suite)
- 84. Sound Tennis no. 1 (soprano & mezzo-soprano) (words are letter-names of sung notes) (1993/4)
- 85. Gong Piano no. 8 (6 pianos) (1994)
- 86. Dream Procession no 2 (soprano voice, narrator, oboe, viola, 'cello) (Ojibway – (Amerindian) poem narrated, also sung in fragmented syllables – the technique is called SPEAK/SING/PLAY) (1994) H
- 87. LightHeartDance no. 2 (as 86 – SPEAK/SING/PLAY) (with the poem "Moving Ahead" by Rainer Maria Rilke)(1994)
- 88. Starmilk no. 2 (as 86 – SPEAK/SING/PLAY) (with the poem "Coming Out of Sleep" by Tricia Corob) 5m (1994)(86 – 88 form SPEAK/SING/PLAY Suite no. 1)
- 89. Apple Blossom (counter-tenor, 2 tenors, bass) (words – "Apple Blossom" – poem by Tricia Corob) 8m (1994)
- 89a. Apple Blossom, transposed version for female choir: soprano, 2 mezzo-sopranos, alto (1995)
- 90. Silence Is the Voice (as 89) (words – Ron Wildego) (1994)
- 91. Who Knows Of The Cosmos (as 89) (words – Ron Wildego) (1994)
- 92. Man Is the Mirror (as 89) (words – Ron Wildego) (1994)
- 93. Open Screen (any no. of any instruments) any length (1994)
- 94. Train no. 1 (soprano/narrator, mezzo-soprano/narrator, oboe, viola, 'cello) (SPEAK/SING/PLAY piece, with the poem "Learning Sanskrit" by Tricia Corob)(1994)
- 95. Circle no. 1 (as 94) (SPEAK/SING/PLAY piece, with the poem "A List of Saints" by Brian Lee) (1994)
- 96. Aeolus no 1 (as 94) (SPEAK/SING/PLAY, with "The Gazelle" by Rainer Maria Rilke) 2V2m (1994) (94, 95, 96 form SPEAK/SING/PLAY Suite no 2)
- 97. Sound Tennis 2 (soprano/narrator, 2 mezzo-sopranos/narrators) (SPEAK/SING, with "Gong" by Rainer Maria Rilke) 8m (1995)
- 98. Sound Tennis 3 (as 97) (SPEAK/SING with "Palm" by Rainer Maria Rilke) (1995)
- 99. Cello Suite no. 1 (5 movement version) or (3 movements): Irregular Crystal, 2m Dance of Asymmetry, 1 1/2m Flight, 7m Fast Complex Study, 6m Meandering Rhythms, 9m (1994/5)
- 100. Songs of Symmetry 3 (6 pianos or 6 keyboards) 12m (1995)
- 101. Viola Suite no. 3 (3 movements): Meander, 7m Study, 7 1/2m Cantabile (1995)
- 102. Viola Study no. 3 (1995)
- 103. String Quartet no. 2 (4 movements) Songs of Symmetry 2, Aeolus 2, Silverstream, Blue String 1 (1995)
- 104. String Quartet Tennis Doubles no 1, 1 movement (1995)
- 105. Sound Tennis Doubles no 1 (soprano, 2 mezzo-sopranos, alto) (words are the letter names of the notes) (1995)
- 106. Silverstream no. 2 (long version) for string quartet I (1995)
- 107. String Quartet Tennis Doubles no. 2 (reduced version) about 14m 1 movement (1995)
- 108. Sound Tennis Doubles no 2 (2 sopranos, 2 mezzos) (words are letter names of the sung notes) about (1996)
- 109. Piano Suite no. 3 "Infinite Psyche" (3 movements: Thresholds; The Great Breath; Fragrant Light Pervading)(1996) [reduced version available – 24m]
- 110. Suite for Viola and Soprano Voice (SPEAK/SING/PLAY, with "Sleeping Outside" by Tricia Corob) (1996)
- 111. "Brightness" (2 sopranos, 2 mezzo voices) (SPEAK/SING with "Morning" by Tricia Corob) (1996)
- 112. Anna Jamieson's piece -piano 2-hands and piano 4-hands versions (1996)
- 113. Earth Music no.2 (soprano, mezzo-soprano, (each doubling as narrator), oboe, viola, 'cello) "Earth Coerces" by Tricia Corob – poem narrated, also sung in fragmented syllables – SPEAK/SING/PLAY) (1997)
- 114. Deep Blue Circles – "10 pm" by Jane Duran – poem narrated, also sung in fragmented syllables – SPEAK/SING/PLAY) (1997)
- 115. Two Worlds – "House of Tides" by Tricia Corob – poem narrated, also sung in fragmented syllables – SPEAK/SING/PLAY) (1997)
- 116. Seas of Space no.7 – "Conversations With Lois" by Jane Duran – poem narrated, also sung in fragmented syllables – SPEAK/SING/PLAY) (1997)
- 117. (17 piece viola concerto version – see op.69) (1997) (2nd and part of 3rd mvmts)
- 118. Interplanetary (words – "Orange Hands, Yellow Hands" by Jeremy Reed) – for 2 sopranos and 2 mezzo-sopranos (1997)
- 119. Solo String Study no.4 (violin) (1997)
- 120. Solo String Study no.5 (violin) (1997)
- 121. The Clown – solo piano (1998)
- 122. Piano Suite no.4 "The Aerodynamics of Intuition" – 1) Austere Eastern 2) Firewheeldance 3) The Swing (22m) (1998)
- 123. Childlike – (soprano, mezzo-soprano, (each doubling as narrator), oboe, viola, 'cello) "In That Childhood Time" by Mimi Khalvati – poem narrated, also sung in fragmented syllables – SPEAK/SING/PLAY) (1998)
- 124. Fine – (soprano, mezzo-soprano, (each doubling as narrator), oboe, viola, 'cello) "With Finest Needles" by Mimi Khalvati (standard speaksingplay) (1998)
- 125. Beginning Music – (soprano, mezzo-soprano, (each doubling as narrator), oboe, viola, 'cello) "Dawn Paves Its Own Way" by Mimi Khalvati SSP (1998)
- 126. Cat Music – (soprano, mezzo-soprano, (each doubling as narrator), oboe, viola, 'cello) "Curling Her Tail" by Mimi Khalvati SSP (1998)
- 127. Circle no.1 – (soprano, mezzo-soprano, (each doubling as narrator), oboe, viola, 'cello) "Light Comes Between Us And Our grief" by Mimi Khalvati SSP (1998)
- 128. Sea Raga – (soprano, mezzo-soprano, (each doubling as narrator), oboe, viola, 'cello) "Fold After Fold" by Tricia Corob SSP (1998)
- 129. Solo String Study no.7 (violin) (1998)
- 130. Violin and Viola Study no.1 (1998)
- 131. Oboe Study no.1 (1998)
- 132. "Bright Elastic Echoes" (1999–2000) – septet (fl, cl, vln, cell, marimba, vibraphone, piano)
- 133. Optical Shuffles – Bell Shapes, Energy Diamond – for Cor Anglais, violin, viola, cello (2000) 2 movements
- 134. Waterwheel Variations (July 1973/August 2000) – soprano voice and viola (sung to the letter names of notes)
- 135. Melodic Geometry (2000) – viola solo (a mosaic of tiny connected pieces).
- 136. Soft Animations – for Cor Anglais, violin, viola, cello (2001)
- 137. Woodberry – for Cor Anglais, violin, viola, cello (2001)
- 138. Coloured Echoing Gaps in Space – for Cor Anglais, violin, viola, cello (2001)
- 139. Love's Living Flame (poem by St.John of the Cross) – for soprano, cor anglais and viola (2003)
- 140. More Light – (poem by Jeanine Miller) for soprano, oboe and viola (2003)
- 141. Forget-me-not (poem by Jeanine Miller) for soprano, oboe and viola (2003)
- 142. Solo String Suite no.4 (5 pieces) (violin or viola) (2003)
- 143. 2nd Symphony (2008)
