= Hugo Peretti =

American songwriter and record producer (1916–1986)

Hugo E. Peretti (December 6, 1916 – May 1, 1986) was an American songwriter, trumpeter, and record producer. He was known for producing hits including Jimmie Rodgers's Billboard No. 1 "Honeycomb" and the Grammy-winning musical theater album Bubbling Brown Sugar.

== Early life ==
Born in New York City to an Italian American family on December 6, 1916, Peretti began his music career as a teenager, playing the trumpet in the Borscht Belt in upstate New York.

== Career ==
Peretti graduated to playing with orchestras, then in the 1950s partnered with his cousin Luigi Creatore to form the Hugo & Luigi songwriting team that evolved to producing records. In 1957 they bought into Roulette Records, where they wrote songs for various artists such as Valerie Carr, and produced major hits for Jimmie Rodgers, including "Honeycomb" (Billboard No. 1), "Kisses Sweeter Than Wine" (Billboard No. 3), "Oh-Oh, I'm Falling in Love Again", and "Secretly".

Two years later, Peretti and Creatore signed a contract with RCA Records, where they produced recordings for pop crooner and NBC television personality Perry Como. They also produced recordings for Sam Cooke and Ray Peterson and wrote English lyrics for the South African composer Solomon Linda's song "The Lion Sleeps Tonight", which became a hit for The Tokens. With George David Weiss, they co-wrote "Can't Help Falling in Love" for RCA's mega-star Elvis Presley. Peretti and Creatore also wrote Presley's hit single "Wild in the Country". In 1964, Peretti and Creatore left RCA to join Weiss in writing Maggie Flynn, a 1968 Broadway musical about the American Civil War.

In the 1970s, Peretti and Creatore owned part of Avco Records and then established H&L Records, which they operated until retiring at the end of the decade. Among their successes were recordings by The Stylistics and The Softones. They also won the 1977 Grammy Award for Best Musical Theater Album as producers of Bubbling Brown Sugar.

== Personal life and death ==
Peretti met and married singer June Winters in 1943. They formed a children's record label, Mayfair Records, in 1946 and released a series of bestselling albums featuring Winters as the "Lady in Blue". They had two daughters, Kathy and Tina Marie. Winters died on March 29, 2015, at the age of 96.

Peretti died on May 1, 1986, in Englewood, New Jersey, aged 69.
