= Rachel Fuller =

British musician (born 1973)

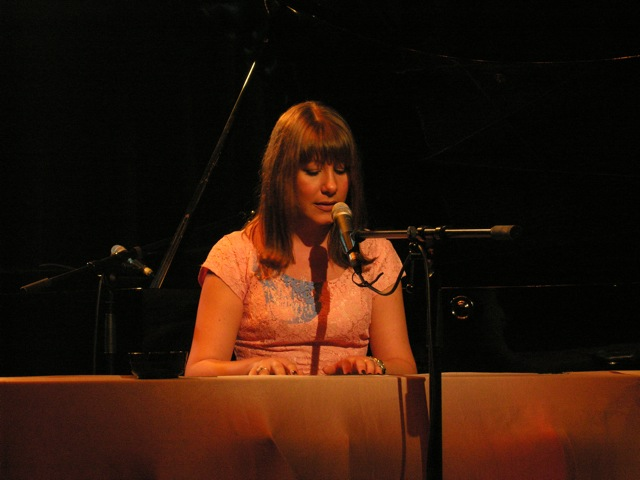

Background information
- Born: 24 July 1973 (age 53); Ipswich, England
- Genres: Rock; pop
- Occupations: Singer-songwriter; musician; composer
- Instruments: Vocals; piano
- Label: Various
- Spouse: Pete Townshend (m. 2016)
- Website: myspace.com/rachelintheattic

Rachel Fuller Townshend (born 24 July 1973) is a British musician. She is a pop music artist, a composer, and occasional collaborator with her husband, rock musician Pete Townshend.

== Early life ==
Born in Ipswich, England, Fuller later moved with her family to Southend-on-Sea. She started playing piano at the age of six and composing music at the age of ten, and her original ambition was to be a concert performer. She attended St. Michael's, a private school in Leigh, where her mother was the school deputy.

Rachel Fuller's teenage years were filled with numerous music competitions, songwriting with her best friend Mikey Cuthbert and a lengthy stint as an organist in a funeral home, where she performed up to eleven times a day.

== Music career ==
As an in-demand orchestrator, with her works recorded by the London Chamber Orchestra, Fuller met The Who's Pete Townshend in 1996, becoming the arranger for his The Lifehouse Chronicles album and subsequent concerts at London's Sadler's Wells Theatre.

With Townshend she co-wrote a song titled "It's Not Enough" featured on The Who's studio album Endless Wire, released in 2006. This song also appeared in Pete Townshend's musical The Boy Who Heard Music, along with the song "I Can Fly," written solely by Fuller. Townshend later contributed material to Fuller's musical Ash.

Cigarettes and Housework, her first album, was released in 2004 after she was signed to Universal Records by Doug Morris. The album includes musical contributions from Townshend, Pino Palladino and Mark Brzezicki. The track "Around This Table" featured a spoken vocal from her friend Jerry Hall, who invited Fuller in turn to appear as her sidekick on VH1's reality program Kept. Fuller appeared as herself in the episode "Gamesmanship".

Fuller has collaborated with Delerium, performing her own track "Touched" on their 2003 Nettwerk release Chimera. Her song "Wonderland" was picked for the soundtrack of the movie Shall We Dance?, released in 2004 on the Casablanca label, starring Richard Gere and Jennifer Lopez. In 2006 she released an EP of five songs, called Shine. The songs were partially or wholly reworked versions of ones she had previously released on her first blog, or added to her profile on the Independent Artists Company website.

Fuller scored a classical adaptation of The Who's Quadrophenia. The adaptation was issued on CD as Classic Quadrophenia featuring the Royal Philharmonic Orchestra and London Oriana Choir, along with tenor Alfie Boe. Pete Townshend and Billy Idol also recorded vocals. The two also appeared for the work's concert premiere, on 5 July 2015 at London's Royal Albert Hall.

== In the Attic ==
Beginning in 2005, Fuller hosted the show In the Attic, a live webcast of music and guests, including The Flaming Lips, E, The Raconteurs, Foy Vance, Adele and Martha Wainwright from Townshend's Oceanic studios in London and also from the road at UK summer music festivals. Though casual in presentation, the broadcasts use state-of-the-art satellite broadcast technology and they are an attempt to change the way live performances of musical artists can be accessed.

In 2006 and 2007, Fuller went on tour with The Who, producing live webcasts of In the Attic and performing her own music live at various venues, including South by Southwest in Austin, Texas.

== Kew ==
In July 2008, feeling she had been neglecting her singer-songwriter side, Fuller embarked on an ambitious week-long journey to record a full album while staying in her flat in Kew, west London, limiting her excursions to its few local shops.

Fuller shared the flat with no one aside from Townshend's dog, Wistle (named after John Entwistle), and online fans following each step of the process via a dedicated 'Week In Kew' website. She crafted one song each day, writing lyrics on the walls of the flat and documenting the experience in the website blog. Fuller also involved her fans by providing interactive services including a live chat room and forum where users could leave feedback and listen to song samples as they were produced.

At the close of her week in Kew, Fuller made the entire album available for free on the website. The songs are a reflection of the artistic process Fuller experienced, joining personal stories with observations and reflections on her time spent in Kew, as well as an homage to her chat room fans.

== Ash ==
On 11 August 2008, a workshop performance of Fuller's musical Ash was performed at the Arcola Theatre in Dalston Kingsland, North-East London, as part of the Grimeborn Festival. With a book by Jack Shepherd, Ash revolves around the lives of and relationship between a teenager, Sarah, who works as an organist in a crematorium and feels caged, and her mother, Louise, who by contrast lives a life with even more abandon than that her daughter herself desires. The show examines themes of life and death and contemporary attitudes to both.

Fuller and Jack Shepherd had been introduced by a mutual friend who worked at the Globe Theatre. Ash contains autobiographical elements of Fuller's life, and as part of research, she and Jack Shepherd visited Southend Crematorium in early 2008.

== Personal life ==
She resides in the London Borough of Richmond upon Thames with her husband Pete Townshend, whom she married in 2016. Rachel is a dog lover and is affiliated with PAAWS Antigua, a non-profit animal rescue shelter in Antigua and Barbuda.
