= John Bundrick =

American musician (born 1948)

John "Rabbit" Bundrick
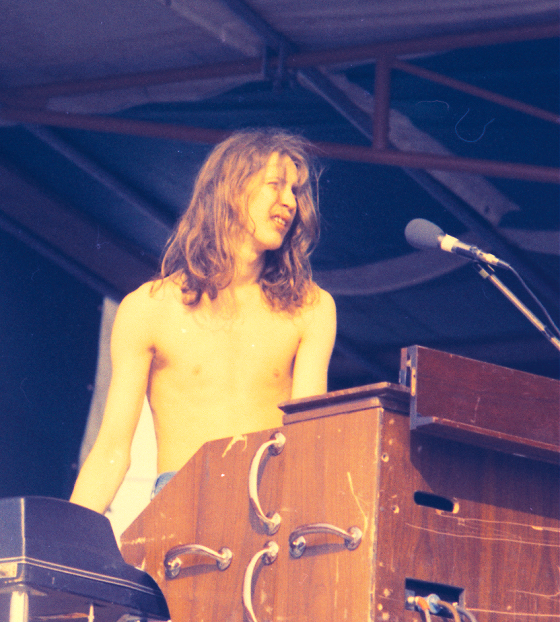
- Bundrick at a performance in Hyde Park, London, 1974

Background information
- Born: John Douglas Bundrick; November 21, 1948 (age 77); Houston, Texas, U.S.
- Genres: Blues rock; hard rock; blues
- Occupations: Musician; songwriter; producer
- Instruments: Keyboards; vocals
- Years active: 1971–present
- Formerly of: Free; The Who; Mallard; Back Street Crawler; Crawler

John Douglas "Rabbit" Bundrick (born November 21, 1948) is an American keyboardist and vocalist. He is best known for his work with the Who and associations with others including Eric Burdon, Bob Marley and the Wailers, Roger Waters, Free and Crawler. Bundrick is noted as the principal musician for the cult film The Rocky Horror Picture Show. In the mid-1970s, he was a member of the short-lived group Mallard, formed by ex-members of Captain Beefheart's Magic Band. He is also known as a composer and has recorded solo albums. He was also a member of the Texas group Blackwell, who had a hit single in 1969 entitled "Wonderful".

Bundrick has been nicknamed "Rabbit" since his schooldays, because of his prominent front teeth.

== Biography ==
=== Kossoff, Kirke, Tetsu and Rabbit ===
In 1971, Bundrick recorded and wrote five tracks for the album Kossoff Kirke Tetsu Rabbit with guitarist Paul Kossoff, drummer Simon Kirke and bassist Tetsu Yamauchi.

=== Johnny Nash and Bob Marley ===
Bundrick toured and recorded with Texan vocalist Johnny Nash. Bundrick played on Nash's hit single and album "I Can See Clearly Now" (1972). He met Bob Marley while in Sweden, while working on the soundtrack to the Swedish film Vill så gärna tro. Marley, Bundrick, and Johnny Nash became roommates there during the stay. Sometime after their return to London, Bundrick was brought in to collaborate on arrangements for Marley's Catch a Fire album, adding keyboards to the original Jamaican recordings to make the record more accessible to listeners. Around this time, Bundrick also worked with Chris Blackwell of Island Records, appearing on recordings by the company.

=== Free ===
In 1972 the members of Free reformed joined by Bundrick on keyboards. They recorded Free's final album Heartbreaker, which included "Muddy Water" and "Common Mortal Man" by Bundrick, who was also credited for collaborations on two other tracks. After a brief period of touring Free broke up.

=== Pete Townshend and the Who ===
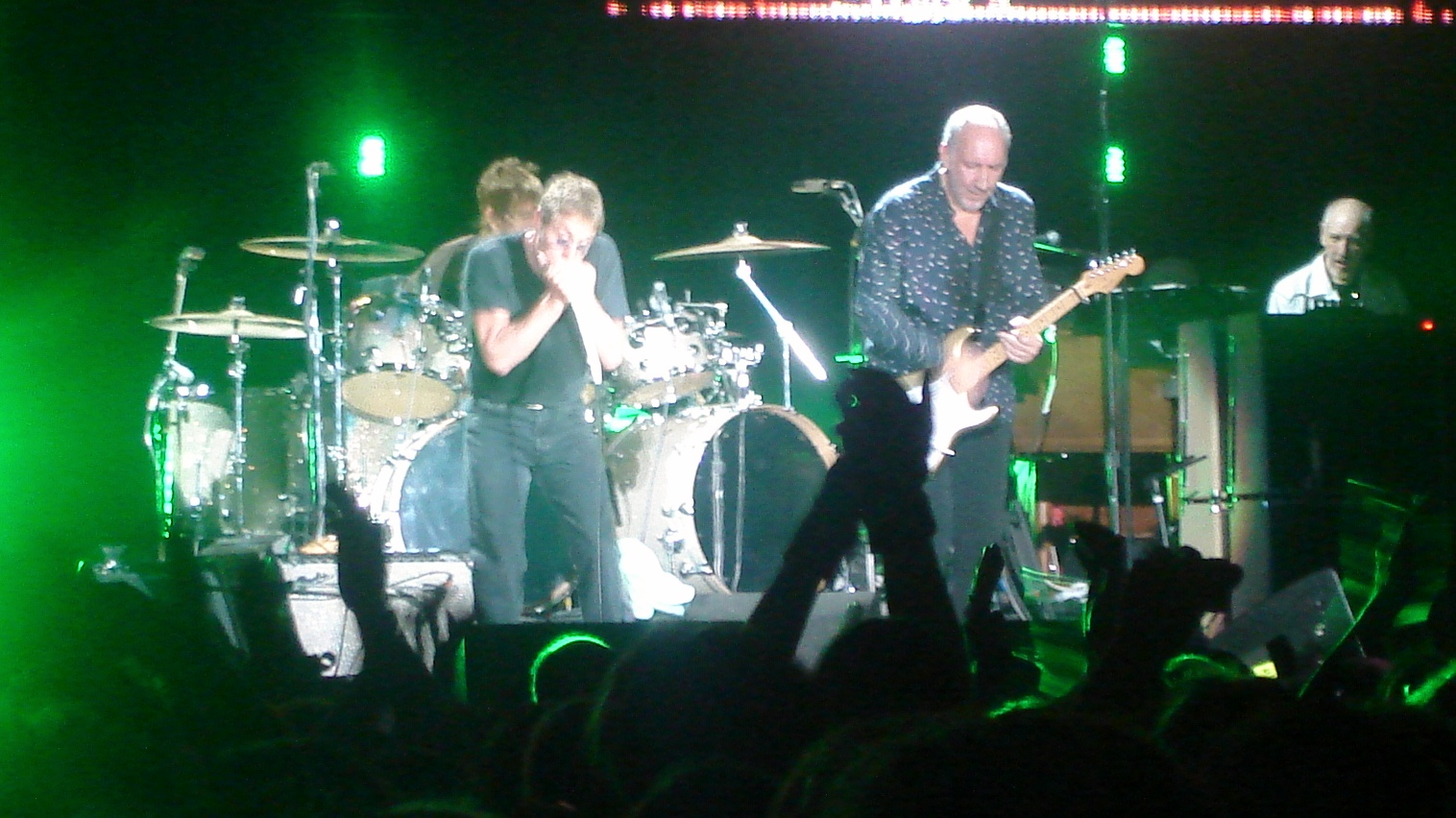
The Who in 2007: Zak Starkey, Roger Daltrey, Pete Townshend and Bundrick

Bundrick first worked with Pete Townshend in 1977 when he performed on Rough Mix, Townshend's collaboration with Ronnie Lane, former bass player for Small Faces and Faces. He was invited to play on the Who's album Who Are You (1978), but broke his arm falling out of a taxi at the studio door and was unable to participate in recording sessions. Bundrick toured with the Who from 1979 to 1981 along with drummer Kenney Jones and played on their album Face Dances (1981), then briefly parted with the band during the recording of It's Hard (1982) and the subsequent tour. Bundrick later rejoined the band performing with them at Live Aid in 1985 and played live with them until 2012.

Bundrick played on the Who's single "Real Good Looking Boy" and "Old Red Wine" in 2004, and on their album Endless Wire (2006) and joined the band for The Who Tour 2006–2007, appearing in the summer and fall concerts. He missed the start of the second leg of the North American tour due to the illness of his wife Sue; keyboard technician Brian Kehew took keyboard duties. Townshend said at the time that Sue was "very close to the end, and [Rabbit] will be back with us when she's gone".

=== 2008–present ===
In the spring of 2008, Bundrick married Canadian Jody Ahern. On July 12, 2008, he performed at the recording of VH1 Honors the Who in Los Angeles. He then worked with English alternative folk band Small Engine Repair and played on their track "This Whole Setup Is A Lie". In December 2009, it was announced he was working with the band Night Parade on their new album.

Bundrick performed with the Who for their Super Bowl XLIV halftime show in 2010. He played with the group in 2011 at a charity show but was replaced in the subsequent tours. Pete Townshend has commented that there ".. was an issue between Roger Daltrey and Rabbit."

== Selected discography ==
- 1971 Kossoff Kirke Tetsu Rabbit
- 1972 Johnny Nash – I Can See Clearly Now
- 1972 Sandy Denny – Sandy
- 1973 Free – Heartbreaker
- 1973 Paul Kossoff – Back Street Crawler
- 1973 John Martyn – Solid Air
- 1973 Bundrick – Broken Arrows
- 1973 Donovan – Cosmic Wheels
- 1974 Bundrick – Dark Saloon
- 1974 Kevin Ayers, John Cale, Nico, Eno – June 1, 1974
- 1974 Bryn Haworth – Let the Days Go By
- 1975 The Rocky Horror Picture Show
- 1975 Jim Capaldi – Short Cut Draw Blood
- 1975 Andy Fairweather Low – La Booga Rooga
- 1977 Joan Armatrading – Show Some Emotion
- 1977 Eric Burdon – Survivor
- 1977 Townshend & Lane – Rough Mix
- 1979 The Only Ones – Special View
- 1980 Pete Townshend – Empty Glass
- 1981 The Who – Face Dances
- 1985 Pete Townshend. White City. A novel
- 1985 Deep End – Deep End Live!
- 1988 Bundrick – Dream Jungle
- 1992 Roger Waters – Amused to Death
- 1993 Bundrick - Same Old Story
- 1994 Bundrick - Run For Cover
- 1995 Bundrick - Dream Jungle expanded
- 1996 Bundrick - Tour Guide
- 1996 Crawler - Pastime Dreamer
- 1997 Bundrick - Moccasin Warrior
- 1998 Bundrick - Moccasin Warrior II’’
- 1999 Fairport Convention – Cropredy 98
- 2006 The Who – Endless Wire
- 2007 Mick Jagger – The Very Best of Mick Jagger (Deluxe Edition)
- 2008 David Byron – That Was Only Yesterday – The Last EP
- 2015 Elton Novara – Lei Ha Perso il Contatto con la Realtà
- 2015 208 Talks of Angels – Made in Hell
- 2017 The Puss Puss Band – Echoes Across the Cruel Sea
- 2019 Neil Hamburger – Still Dwelling
- 2026 John "Rabbit" Bundrick - Mr. Big Boss Man
