= Simon Townshend =

British guitarist (born 1960)

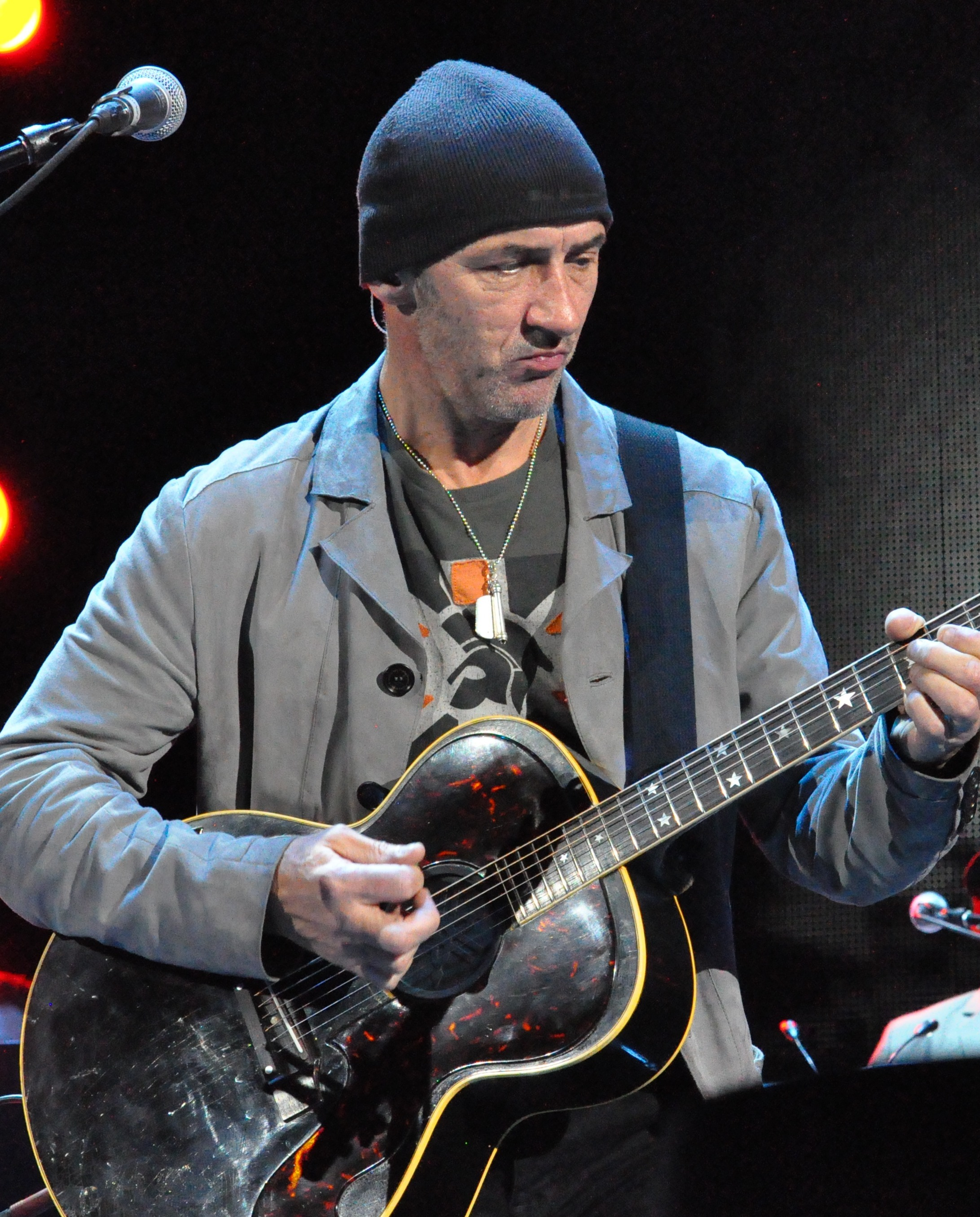
- Townshend performing in 2012

Background information
- Born: 10 October 1960 (age 65); Chiswick, Middlesex, England
- Origin: Finchley, Middlesex, England
- Genres: Rock; new wave; hard rock; acoustic
- Occupations: Musician; songwriter; record producer
- Instruments: Vocals; guitar; mandolin; keyboards
- Years active: 1974–present
- Label: Stir Music
- Website: Official website
- Parents: Cliff Townshend (father); Betty Dennis (mother)
- Relatives: Pete Townshend (brother)

Simon Townshend (/ˈtaʊnzənd/; born 10 October 1960) is a British guitarist, singer and songwriter. He is the younger brother of the Who's guitarist Pete Townshend, and is most associated with the Who and the various side projects of its original members. Simon Townshend has also performed with numerous other acts including Pearl Jam, Dave Grohl and Jeff Beck.

== Early life ==
Simon Townshend was born on 10 October 1960 in Chiswick, London, the same area and town where older brother Pete Townshend was born. He grew up into a musical family. He was the youngest of three sons born to Cliff Townshend, a professional saxophonist in The Squadronaires, and his wife, Betty Townshend (née Dennis), who had an early career as a singer. By the time he was born, his father's career as a jazz musician was winding down, while Pete became successful as the primary songwriter of the rock band the Who in the mid-1960s.

In 1974 Townshend released his debut single, When I'm a Man, at the age of 13. Nine years later, in 1983, he released his first solo album, Sweet Sound, followed by Moving Target in 1985. In 1989, he also appeared on his brother Pete Townshend's fifth solo album, The Iron Man: The Musical by Pete Townshend, singing on the short song "Man Machines" and an alternative version of "Dig".

In 1994, he toured with the Who's lead vocalist Roger Daltrey on the Daltrey Sings Townshend tour.

== Career ==
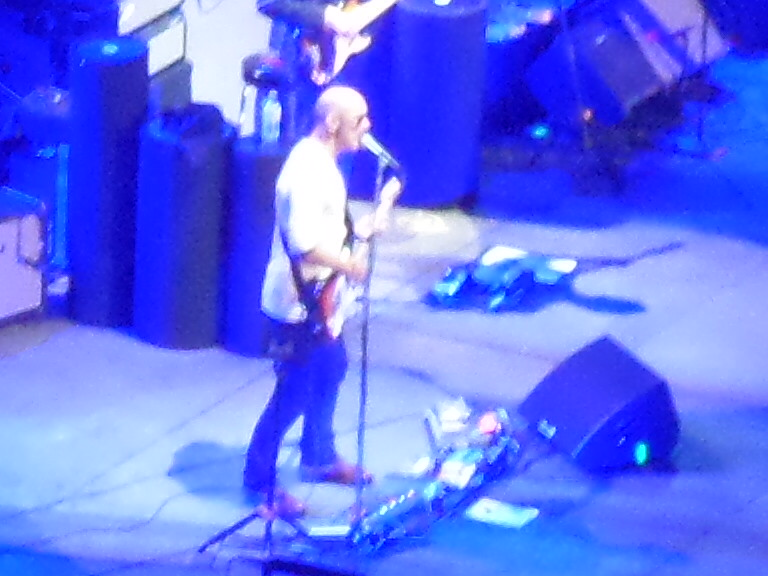
Townshend performing live with the Who at Manchester Arena in 2014

In 1996, after starting his own record label and production company, Stir Music, Simon Townshend released several other albums including studio and live performances. He joined the Who as a second guitarist for their Quadrophenia Tour in 1996 and 1997. He later rejoined the band as a full touring member in 2002 and has played with them on each of their tours since. Simon Townshend also joined Casbah Club in 2004, which included Bruce Foxton (bass guitarist for The Jam) and Mark Brzezicki (drummer for Big Country) and Bruce Watson (guitarist for Big Country), where he functioned as lead guitarist, lead vocalist and songwriter.

In 2006 Simon Townshend joined the European leg of the Who's tour, playing a support set with Casbah Club as well as performing with the Who (see The Who Tour 2006-2007). Simon Townshend played rhythm guitar, mandolin, and performed backing vocals.

He played a modified Fender Stratocaster with P-90 pick-ups. Simon Townshend also uses a signature guitar designed and developed by JJ Guitars in addition to their Retro Lux model.

His first credited collaboration with the Who involved participation as one of the supporting choralists for Ken Russell's film adaptation of Tommy which was released in 1975.

He also had contributed backing vocals to the Who's Endless Wire album in 2006.

On 11 August 2009 Simon joined Pearl Jam onstage at the Shepherd's Bush Empire in London for a performance of "The Real Me" from the Who's Quadrophenia album.

In the autumn of 2009, he embarked on a tour of the US with Roger Daltrey and the No Plan B band. The band continued touring in the spring of 2010, playing a number of dates in support of Eric Clapton. Further tours in 2011 and 2012 followed, with the band performing a complete version of Tommy.

In February 2012, he began his own tour of the UK, in support of his new album which has been credited as his most impactful solo recording to date "Looking Out Looking In", which London's Daily Express rated 5/5, calling it "utterly compelling" and naming Simon Townshend "a genuinely original talent."

His live band for this contained Tony Lowe (guitar), Phil Spalding (bass), and Greg Pringle (drums), His live shows have been variously described as "supercharged" (New York Times), "irresistible" (Washington Post) and a "catharsis" (Los Angeles Times). Billboard labelled him "impressive" and Goldmine affirmed, "truly enjoyable listening." In short, as London's Gig Guide said, "you would be a fool to miss him."

In the late summer and autumn of 2012, he played with the Who on the Quadrophenia and More tour, which included a performance at the 2012 Summer Olympics closing ceremony. In July 2014 at Milton Keynes Bowl he again joined Pearl Jam on stage to perform his song “I'm the Answer.”

From 2014 to 2016, Townshend joined the Who on their 50th anniversary tour, the Who Hits 50!. In 2018, he toured with Roger Daltrey, performing Tommy with local orchestras in the United States.

== Discography ==
=== Studio albums ===
- Sweet Sound (1983, Polydor)
- Moving Target (1985, Polydor)
- Among Us (1996, Rising Records)
- Animal Soup (1999, Stir)
- Venustraphobia as Casbah Club (2006, Stir)
- Looking Out Looking In (2012, Eagle Rock Entertainment)
- Denial (2014, Stir)

=== Compilation albums ===
- Simontownshendis (2002, Stir)
- Scraps (2000)

=== Extended plays ===
- Ages (2000, Stir)
- Something New (2011, Stir)

=== Live albums ===
- Bare Bodies Bare Assets (2000, Stir)
- Animal Soup Live at the Astoria (2005, Stir)

=== Singles ===
- "When I'm a Man" (1974, Warner Bros.)
- "Janie" (1975, Warner Bros.)
- "Turn It On" (1976, Warner Bros.)
- "Ready for Action" (1980, WEA)
- "Another Planet" (1980, WEA)
- "I'm the Answer" (1983, Polydor)
- "So Real" (1983, Polydor)
- "Sweet Sound" [Promo] (1983, Polydor)
- "Barriers" (1985, Polydor)
- "Meet You" (1985, Polydor)
- "Broken Heart" (1987, Dignity Records)
- "Walking in Wonderland" (1988, Dignity)
- "The Way It Is" [Promo] (1996, Rising)
- "Bare Essence" (2013, Stir)

== Personal life ==
Simon Townshend is married to Janie Townshend, with whom he has three children. His song "Girl in New York" was written for her.
