= Pete Townshend discography =

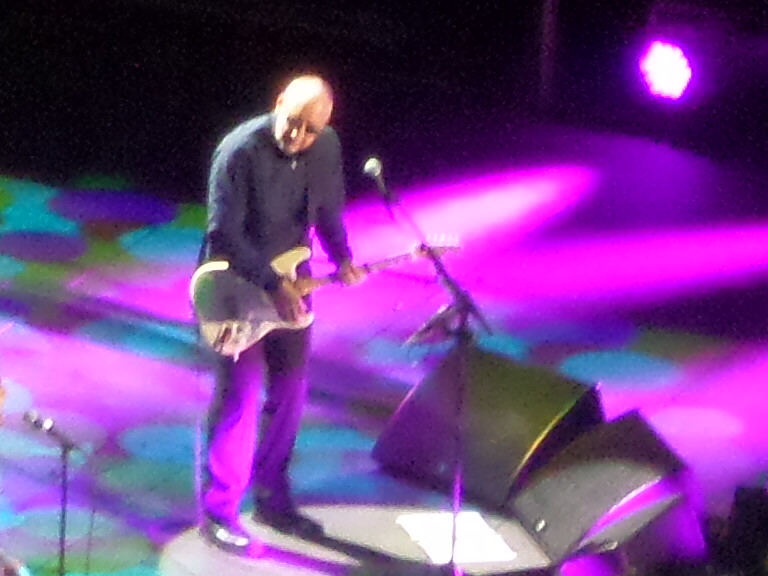
- Townshend performing with the Who at Manchester Arena in 2014
- Studio albums: 6
- Live albums: 9
- Compilation albums: 4
- Singles: 18

The following is the solo discography of the English rock musician Pete Townshend. Townshend's career as a published musician and songwriter began in 1964 as a member of rock band the Who, before branching out as a solo artist in the 1970s.

== Studio albums ==
Year	Album details	Peak chart positions										Certifications
Year	Album details	UK	AUS	AUT	GER	NED	NZ	NOR	SWE	SWI	US	Certifications
1972	Who Came First	30	35	—	—	—	—	—	—	—	69	
1977	Rough Mix (with Ronnie Lane)	44	—	—	—	—	—	—	—	—	45	
1980	Empty Glass	11	28	—	—	—	21	40	—	—	5	RIAA: Platinum
1982	All the Best Cowboys Have Chinese Eyes	32	41	—	—	—	17	33	—	—	26	
1985	White City: A Novel	70	16	26	15	31	20	—	17	11	26	RIAA: Gold; BVMI: Gold
1989	The Iron Man: The Musical by Pete Townshend	—	59	—	—	39	—	—	—	—	58	
1993	Psychoderelict	—	—	—	—	—	—	—	—	—	118	
"—" denotes releases that did not chart

== Live albums ==
Year	Album	Peak chart positions	Notes
Year	Album	US	Notes
1986	Deep End Live!	98	Recorded 1985, expanded version Live: Brixton Academy '85 released 2004
1999	A Benefit For Maryville Academy	—	Recorded 1998
2000	Live: Sadler's Wells	—	Recorded 2000, from Townshend's Lifehouse concert series
2000	Live: The Empire	—	Recorded 1998
2000	Live: The Fillmore	—	Recorded 1996
2001	Live: La Jolla 22/06/01	—	Recorded 2001
2001	Live: La Jolla 23/06/01	—	Recorded 2001
2001	The Oceanic Concerts (with Raphael Rudd)	—	Recorded 1979–1980
2003	Live: Bam 1993	—	Recorded 1993, on Townshend's Psychoderelict tour
"—" denotes releases that did not chart

== Soundtrack albums ==
Year	Recording	Notes
1975	Tommy	From Ken Russell's 1975 film

== Compilations ==
=== Albums ===
Year	Album	Notes
1996	The Best of Pete Townshend	Features new song "Uneasy Street"
2005	Anthology	2xCD
2015	Truancy: The Very Best of Pete Townshend	Features new songs "Guantanamo" and "How Can I Help You"

=== Box sets and samplers ===
Year	Album	Notes
2000	Lifehouse Chronicles	Box set
2000	Lifehouse Elements	Sampler of Lifehouse Chronicles.
2001	Jai Baba	Box set of Happy Birthday, I Am, and With Love
2025	The Studio Albums	Box set

== Singles ==
Year	Album details	Peak chart positions										Album
Year	Album details	UK	AUS	BEL (FL)	CAN	GER	NED	NZ	SWE	SWI	US	Album
1980	"Rough Boys"	39	—	—	—	—	—	—	—	—	89	Empty Glass
1980	"Let My Love Open the Door" b/w "Greyhound Girl", non-album track	46	82	—	5	—	—	—	—	—	9	Empty Glass
1980	"A Little Is Enough"	—	—	—	—	—	—	—	—	—	72	Empty Glass
1980	"Keep on Working"	—	—	—	—	—	—	—	—	—	—	Empty Glass
1982	"Face Dances, Pt. 2" b/w "Man Watching", non-album track	—	—	—	—	—	—	—	—	—	105	All the Best Cowboys Have Chinese Eyes
1982	"Uniforms (Corp d'Esprit)" b/w "Dance It Away", non-album track	48	—	—	—	—	—	—	—	—	—	All the Best Cowboys Have Chinese Eyes
1985	"Face the Face"	89	9	14	17	15	14	11	8	14	26	White City: A Novel
1985	"Give Blood"	—	77	—	—	61	—	—	—	—	—	White City: A Novel
1986	"Secondhand Love"	—	—	—	—	—	—	—	—	—	—	White City: A Novel
1986	"Barefootin'"	—	—	—	—	—	—	—	—	—	—	Deep End Live!
1989	"A Friend Is a Friend" 12" b/w "Real World (Can You Really Dance?)", non-album track	—	113	—	—	—	—	—	—	—	—	The Iron Man: The Musical by Pete Townshend
1989	"I Won't Run Anymore"	—	—	—	—	—	—	—	—	—	—	The Iron Man: The Musical by Pete Townshend
1993	"English Boy"	87	—	—	—	—	—	—	—	—	—	Psychoderelict
1993	"I Believe My Own Eyes"	—	—	—	—	—	—	—	—	—	—	Psychoderelict
1993	"Don't Try to Make Me Real"	—	—	—	—	—	—	—	—	—	—	Psychoderelict
1996	"Let My Love Open the Door" (E. Cola mix)	145	—	—	—	—	—	—	—	—	—	The Best of Pete Townshend
2001	"O' Parvardigar"	—	—	—	—	—	—	—	—	—	—	I Am/Who Came First
2014	"It Must Be Done" (with Nathan Barr)	—	—	—	—	—	—	—	—	—	—	N/A (for The Americans)
2023	"Can't Outrun the Truth"	—	—	—	—	—	—	—	—	—	—	N/A
"—" denotes releases that did not chart

== Other appearances ==
Year	Song	Album
1970	"Content" (with Maud Kennedy), "Day of Silence", "Mary Jane", "The Seeker" (solo version), "Begin the Beguine", and "The Love Man"	Happy Birthday
1972	"Baba O'Riley" (instrumental) and "O' Parvardigar"	I Am
1972	"Classified"	Glastonbury Fayre
1976	"His Hands", "Meher", "Sleeping Dog", and "Lantern Cabin"	With Love
1982	"Ascension Two"	Music & Rhythm
1986	"Life to Life"	Playing for Keeps
2012	"Corrine, Corrina"	Chimes of Freedom: The Songs of Bob Dylan

== Demos ==
=== Albums ===
Year	Album
1983	Scoop
1987	Another Scoop
2001	Scoop 3

=== Compilation ===
Year	Title
2002	Scooped

== Production ==
Year	Title	Artist	Notes
1969	"Wilhelmina"	Thunderclap Newman	also bassist
1970	"I See It All"	Thunderclap Newman	also bassist
1970	"Stormy Petrel"	Thunderclap Newman	also bassist
1970	Hollywood Dream	Thunderclap Newman	also bassist
1979	"Peppermint Lump"/"Breakfast in Naples"	Angie	also arranger
1979	"Spread It Around"	Straight Eight	executive producer on B-sides "It Ain't Easy" and "Oh No"
1983	Sweet Sound	Simon Townshend	
1991	"She Blows My Mind"	The Tambourines	
2003	The Awakening	Raphael Rudd	vocals on "The Awakening", recorded 1978

== Theater and classical ==
=== Plays ===
Year	Recording	Notes
1993	Tommy	Original cast recording of a musical play with music & lyrics by Townshend and book by Townshend & Duff McAnuff. Produced by George Martin.

=== Adaptations ===
Year	Recording	Notes
2015	Classic Quadrophenia	orchestrated by Rachel Fuller conducted by Robert Ziegler
