= The Best of Pete Townshend =

Compilation album by Pete Townshend
- Released: 23 April 1996
- Genre: Rock
- Labels: Virgin (UK); Atlantic (US)

Pete Townshend chronology
Psychoderelict (1993)	The Best of Pete Townshend (1996)	A Benefit for Maryville Academy (1999)

Professional ratings
Review scores
Source	Rating
AllMusic	4/5 stars

The Best of Pete Townshend (sometimes listed with the subtitle [coolwalkingsmoothtalkingstraightsmokingfirestoking], after a lyric from the song "Misunderstood" which is printed on the front cover) is a compilation album by the English musician Pete Townshend, released in 1996. It was released in the UK on the Virgin label, and the US on Atlantic. The compilation included songs from Pete Townshend's solo career as well as two songs from the album Rough Mix with Ronnie Lane. It also included the single edit of English Boy" and the first appearance of "Let My Love Open the Door (E. Cola Mix)" and the Psychoderelict outtake, "Uneasy Street".

== Track listing ==
All tracks are written by Pete Townshend, except "Uneasy Street" by Townshend, Jon Lind and Billy Nicholls.

The Best of Pete Townshend track listing
No.	Title	Original release	Length
1.	"Rough Boys"	Empty Glass, 1980	4:00
2.	"Let My Love Open the Door"	Empty Glass	2:42
3.	"Misunderstood"	Rough Mix (with Ronnie Lane), 1977	2:57
4.	"Give Blood"	White City: A Novel, 1985	5:38
5.	"A Friend Is a Friend"	The Iron Man, 1989	5:01
6.	"Sheraton Gibson"	Who Came First, 1972	2:35
7.	"English Boy"	Psychoderelict, 1993	4:49
8.	"Street in the City"	Rough Mix	6:06
9.	"Pure and Easy"	Who Came First	5:32
10.	"Slit Skirts"	All the Best Cowboys Have Chinese Eyes, 1982	4:59
11.	"The Sea Refuses No River"	All the Best Cowboys Have Chinese Eyes	5:55
12.	"A Little Is Enough"	Empty Glass	4:38
13.	"Face the Face"	White City: A Novel	5:51
14.	"Uneasy Street"	previously unreleased	4:39
15.	"Let My Love Open the Door" (E. Cola mix)	previously unreleased	5:00
