= Pete Townshend Live BAM 1993 =

Live album by Pete Townshend
- Released: 11 August 2003 (United Kingdom)
- Recorded: 7 August 1993
- Genre: Rock
- Label: Eel Pie Records
- Producer: Pete Townshend

Pete Townshend chronology
Scooped (2001)	Pete Townshend Live BAM 1993 (2003)	Live: Brixton Academy '85 (2004)

Pete Townshend Live BAM 1993 is a live recording by Pete Townshend. The music was recorded at the Brooklyn Academy of Music, Brooklyn, N.Y., on 7 August 1993 and a double CD released 11 August 2003 by UK company Eel Pie Recording Productions Ltd. The concert took place during Townshend's Psychoderelict tour and the CD features the entire Psychoderlict performance as well as selections from Townshend's catalogue.

== Cast ==
The cast included:

- Pete Townshend ... Himself
- John Labanowski ... Ray High
- Linal Haft ... Rastus Knight
- Jan Ravens ... Ruth Streeting
- Sage Carter ... Athena
- John Bundrick ... Keyboards
- Peter Hope Evans ... Harmonica
- Andy Fairweather Low ... Guitar
- Deirdre Harrison ... Athena (voice)
- Katie Kissoon ... Vocalist
- Billy Nicholls ... Vocalist
- Pino Palladino ... Bass
- Phil Palmer ... Guitar
- Simon Phillips ... Drums
- Lee Whitlock ... Spinner (voice)

== Track listing ==
Disc 1

1. "Intro"
2. "English Boy"
3. "Meher Baba M3"
4. "Let's Get Pretentious"
5. "Meher Baba M4"
6. "Early Morning Dreams"
7. "I Want That Thing"
8. "Intro: Outlive The Dinosaur"
9. "Outlive The Dinosaur"
10. "Gridlife 1"
11. "Flame" (demo)
12. "Now and Then"
13. "I am Afraid"
14. "Gridlife 2"
15. "Don't Try to Make Me Real"
16. "Intro: Predictable"
17. "Predictable"
18. "Flame"
19. "Meher Baba M5" (Vivaldi)
20. "Fake It"
21. "Intro: Now and Then" (reprise)
22. "Now and Then" (reprise)
23. "Baba O'Riley" (demo)
24. "English Boy" (reprise)

Disc 2

1. "Pinball Wizard"
2. "See Me Feel Me/Listening to You"
3. "Let My Love Open the Door"
4. "Rough Boys"
5. "Behind Blue Eyes"
6. "The Kids Are Alright"
7. "Keep Me Turning"
8. "Eminence Front"
9. "A Little Is Enough"
10. "You Better You Bet"
11. "Face the Face"
12. "Won't Get Fooled Again"
13. "Let’s See Action (Nothing Is Everything)"
14. "Magic Bus"
