= Live: Brixton Academy '85 =

Live album by Pete Townshend
- Released: 16 November 2004 (UK)
- Recorded: 1985
- Genre: Rock
- Label: Eel Pie

Pete Townshend chronology
Pete Townshend Live BAM 1993 (2003)	Live: Brixton Academy '85 (2004)	Anthology (2005)

Live: Brixton Academy '85 is a live album by Pete Townshend. In 2004 Townshend released the complete 1985 Brixton Academy concert, including all of the songs that were on Deep End Live! plus performances of the David Gilmour songs "Love On the Air" (co-written by Townshend) and "Blue Light". The album was released 16 November 2004 in the UK through Eel Pie Recording Productions Ltd.

== Track listing ==
Recorded November 1, 1985 at the Brixton Academy, London, England
No.	Title	Writer(s)	Length
1.	"Mary Anne with the Shaky Hand"	Pete Townshend	2:50
2.	"Won't Get Fooled Again"	Townshend	5:36
3.	"A Little Is Enough"	Townshend	5:22
4.	"Secondhand Love"	Townshend	5:07
5.	"That's All Right, Mama"	Arthur Crudup	3:00
6.	"Behind Blue Eyes"	Townshend	4:25
7.	"The Shout"	Townshend	5:34
8.	"Harlem Shuffle"	Bob Relf/Earl Nelson	5:43
9.	"Barefootin’"	Robert Parker	3:35
10.	"After the Fire"	Townshend	5:51
11.	"Love on the Air"	David Gilmour, Townshend	5:45
12.	"Midnight Lover"	John Bundrick	5:13
13.	"Blue Light"	Gilmour	10:11
14.	"I Put a Spell on You"	Jay Hawkins, Herb Slotkin	4:18
15.	"I'm One"	Townshend	2:46
16.	"Driftin' Blues"	Charles Brown, Eddie Williams, Johnny Moore	2:21
17.	"Magic Bus"	Townshend	4:09
18.	"Save It for Later"	Dave Wakeling	5:10
19.	"Eyesight to the Blind"	Sonny Boy Williamson II	4:20
20.	"Walkin'"	Richard E. Carpenter (disputed)	5:28
21.	"Stop Hurting People"	Townshend	5:33
22.	"The Sea Refuses No River"	Townshend	6:56
23.	"Boogie Stop Shuffle"	Charles Mingus	7:46
24.	"Face the Face"	Townshend	8:18
25.	"Pinball Wizard"	Townshend	7:22
26.	"Give Blood"	Townshend	4:02
27.	"Night Train"	Oscar Washington, Lewis P. Simpkins, Jimmy Forrest	7:12
