= Anthology (Pete Townshend album) =

Compilation album by Pete Townshend
- Released: 10 Oct 2005 (UK); 15 Nov 2005 (US)
- Genre: Rock
- Label: SPV/Revisited (UK); Hip-O (US)

Pete Townshend chronology
| Live: Brixton Academy '85 (2004) | Anthology (2005) | Truancy: The Very Best of Pete Townshend (2015) |

Professional ratings
Review scores
| Source | Rating |
|---|---|
| Allmusic | 4/5 stars |

Anthology is a 2005 double compilation album of Pete Townshend's solo career. The album was originally released in Europe by SPV/Revisited Records on 10 October 2005. The US release by Hip-O Records were released on 15 November 2005 as part of the Gold album series, with alternate cover and reduced pricing but identical content.

== Track listing ==
=== Disc 1 ===
1. "English Boy"
2. "Secondhand Love"
3. "A Little Is Enough"
4. "Heart To Hang Onto"
5. "Sheraton Gibson"
6. "The Sea Refuses No River"
7. "Brilliant Blues"
8. "Now and Then"
9. "I Won't Run Anymore"
10. "Keep Me Turning"
11. "Let My Love Open the Door"
12. "Slit Skirts"
13. "A Friend Is A Friend"
14. "Let's See Action"
15. "Street in the City"
16. "Empty Glass"

=== Disc 2 ===
1. "Rough Boys"
2. "Give Blood"
3. "Exquisitely Bored"
4. "Jools and Jim"
5. "Crashing by Design"
6. "Don't Try To Make Me Real"
7. "Face the Face"
8. "Uniforms"
9. "My Baby Gives It Away"
10. "Outlive the Dinosaur"
11. "Keep on Working"
12. "White City Fighting"
13. "All Shall Be Well"
14. "Time Is Passing"
15. "I Am Afraid"
16. "Misunderstood"
17. "Pure and Easy"
18. "Parvardigar"
