= A Benefit for Maryville Academy =

Pete Townshend Live: A Benefit for Maryville Academy

Live album by Pete Townshend
- Released: 21 September 1999
- Recorded: 16 August 1998
- Venue: House of Blues, Chicago, United States
- Genre: Rock
- Length: 85.05
- Label: Platinum Entertainment
- Producer: Jon Carin

Pete Townshend chronology
The Best of Pete Townshend (1996)	Pete Townshend Live: A Benefit for Maryville Academy (1999)	Lifehouse Chronicles (2000)

Pete Townshend Live: A Benefit for Maryville Academy (Platinum 9555) is a 1998 live album by English rock musician Pete Townshend, member of The Who, recorded at the House of Blues in Chicago. It was produced by multi-instrumentalist Jon Carin. A bonus CD features two tracks with Eddie Vedder, Pearl Jam's vocalist.

It was released by Platinum Entertainment, licensed by the Who's charity, Double O Promotions Limited and all artist royalties benefit the Roman Catholic Chicago-based institution Maryville Academy, "a leader in the treatment of physically, sexually, and emotional abused children. It provides a safe, secure, and stable environment where these youngsters can regain the hope they lost so long ago and begin the healing process."

== Track listing ==
All tracks are written by Pete Townshend, except where noted

Disc one
No.	Title	Writer(s)	Original album	Length
1.	"On the Road Again"	Floyd Jones, Alan Wilson	Canned Heat cover	5:30
2.	"Anyway, Anyhow, Anywhere"	Roger Daltrey, Townshend	single	7:45
3.	"A Little Is Enough"		Empty Glass	5:36
4.	"Drowned"		Quadrophenia	6:54
5.	"You Better You Bet"		Face Dances	5:50
6.	"Now and Then"		Psychoderelict	4:17
7.	"North Country Girl"	Traditional; arranged by Townshend	All the Best Cowboys Have Chinese Eyes	3:46
8.	"Let My Love Open the Door"		Empty Glass	5:13
9.	"Won't Get Fooled Again"		Who's Next	12:59
10.	"Magic Bus"		single	13:33
11.	"I'm One"		Quadrophenia	3:10

Bonus CD

Disc two
No.	Title	Original album	Length
1.	"Magic Bus"	single	6:01
2.	"Heart to Hang Onto"	Rough Mix	4:31

Tracks on disc two come from the Maryville Academy benefit show performed at the House of Blues on 14 June 1997.

== Performers ==
Disc 1

- Pete Townshend - vocals, electric and acoustic guitars
- Jon Carin - keyboards, drum tracks, sequencer, vocals
- Peter Hope-Evans - mouth organ, Jew's harp
- Jody Linscott - percussion
- Chucho Merchán - double bass, and additional percussion on "Now and Then"
- Tracey Langran - hi-string guitar, vocals

Disc 2

- Pete Townshend - vocals, guitar
- Eddie Vedder - vocals
- Jon Carin - keyboards, vocals
