= Truancy: The Very Best of Pete Townshend =

Greatest hits album by Pete Townshend
- Released: 29 June 2015
- Genre: Rock

Pete Townshend chronology
Anthology (2005)	Truancy: The Very Best of Pete Townshend (2015)

Professional ratings
Review scores
Source	Rating
AllMusic	3.5/5 stars

Truancy is a greatest hits album that features fifteen of Pete Townshend's greatest hits. The album also features two brand new tracks: "Guantanamo" and "How Can I Help You".

== Track listing ==
1. "Pure and Easy"
2. "Sheraton Gibson"
3. "(Nothing Is Everything) Let's See Action"
4. "My Baby Gives It Away"
5. "Heart to Hang Onto"
6. "Keep Me Turning"
7. "Let My Love Open the Door"
8. "Rough Boys"
9. "The Sea Refuses No River"
10. "Face Dances, Pt. 2"
11. "White City Fighting"
12. "Face the Face"
13. "I Won't Run Anymore"
14. "English Boy"
15. "You Came Back"
16. "Guantanamo"
17. "How Can I Help You"

== Production ==
- Richard Evans: Design & Art Direction
- Terry O'Neil: Photography
- Matt Kent: Liner notes
- Myles Clark: Mixed by
- Miles Showell: Mastering
