= English Boy =

English Boy may refer to:

- English Boy (agency), modelling agency established by Alice Pollock and Sir Mark Palmer
- "English Boy" (song), song by Pete Townshend from his 1993 album Psychoderelict
- "English Boys" (song), song by the American band Blondie from their 1982 album The Hunter
- English Boy Wonders, album by the English progressive rock band Big Big Train
- "English Boys", a song by Luna Halo from their 2007 self-titled album
