= Come to Mama =

Come to Mama may refer to:

- "Come to Mama", a song by Pete Townshend from White City: A Novel
- "Come to Mama", a song by Lady Gaga from Joanne
