= Love on the Air (disambiguation) =

"Love on the Air" is a 1984 song by David Gilmour, co-written by Pete Townshend.

Love on the Air may also refer to:

- Love on the Air, a 2015 Hallmark movie starring Alison Sweeney
- Love on the Air, an album by A. J. Gundell

== See also ==
- Love on the Airwaves, a 1977 album by Gallagher and Lyle
