= Scoop 3 =

Compilation album by Pete Townshend
- Released: 2001
- Recorded: 1971–2001
- Genre: Rock
- Length: 119:00
- Label: Hip-O (US)

Pete Townshend chronology
Live: La Jolla Playhouse 2001 (2001)	Scoop 3 (2001)	Scooped (2002)

Released in 2001, Scoop 3 is a compilation of demos and alternate versions of previous Who songs and new Pete Townshend material.

== History ==
It is the third and last Scoop collection. It contains considerably fewer demos and alternate versions of previous Who songs than the previous Scoop and Another Scoop thus it contains much more recent material than the previous albums. In addition to Who music, the album also contains songs from Townshend's decades-old albums such as The Iron Man: A Musical and All the Best Cowboys Have Chinese Eyes. Notably, one of the demos, "Marty Robbins", recorded in June 1984, would later appear in 2006 in completed form on The Who's first album in 24 years, Endless Wire, with the song retitled as "God Speaks of Marty Robbins". "All Lovers Are Deranged" is a version of the song for which Townshend put lyrics to music by David Gilmour, for the latter's 1984 album About Face. Another song from the same collaboration became "White City Fighting" on Townshend's White City: A Novel.

Scoop 3 was re-issued on 29 August 2006 on the SPV label.

In 2002 a pared-down compilation of all the Scoop albums (Scoop, Another Scoop and Scoop 3) was released as Scooped. Remastered versions of the original albums were released in 2006.

Professional ratings
Review scores
Source	Rating
AllMusic	link

== Track listing ==
All tracks written and composed by Pete Townshend, except where noted.

Disc one
No.	Title	Length
1.	"Can You See the Real Me?"	4:19
2.	"Dirty Water"	1:04
3.	"Commonwealth Boys"	3:40
4.	"Theme 015"	0:42
5.	"Marty Robbins"	1:42
6.	"I Like It The Way It Is"	4:39
7.	"Theme 016"	0:42
8.	"No Way Out (However Much I Booze)"	6:07
9.	"Collings"	2:36
10.	"Parvardigar (German Version)"	6:47
11.	"Sea and Sand"	5:02
12.	"971104 Arpeggio Piano"	1:38
13.	"Theme 017"	2:09
14.	"I Am Afraid"	2:30
15.	"Maxims for Lunch"	2:55
16.	"Wistful"	2:59
17.	"Eminence Front"	6:34
18.	"Lonely Words"	3:57

Disc two
No.	Title	Writer(s)	Length
1.	"Prelude 970519"		0:39
2.	"Iron Man Recitative"	Ted Hughes, Townshend	3:39
3.	"Tough Boys"		3:11
4.	"Did You Steal My Money?"		3:53
5.	"Can You Really Dance?"		3:47
6.	"Variations on Dirty Jobs"		4:40
7.	"All Lovers Are Deranged"		3:23
8.	"Elephants"		2:53
9.	"Wired to the Moon, Pt. 2"		1:29
10.	"How Can You Do It Alone?"		6:26
11.	"Poem Disturbed"		3:11
12.	"Squirm Squirm"		4:10
13.	"Outlive the Dinosaur"		3:39
14.	"Teresa"		4:38
15.	"Man and Machines"		3:48
16.	"It's In Ya"		5:32

== See also ==
- Scoop
- Another Scoop
- Scooped
