= Live: The Fillmore =

Live album by Pete Townshend
- Released: 30 October 2000 (UK)
- Recorded: 30 April 1996
- Genre: Rock
- Label: Eelpie

Pete Townshend chronology
Live: Sadler's Wells (2000)	Live: The Fillmore (2000)	Jai Baba (2001)

Live: The Filmore is a live recording by Pete Townshend. It was recorded at The Fillmore in San Francisco, California on 30 April 1996 and released 30 October 2000 by UK company Eel Pie Recording Productions Ltd. Townshend was accompanied by Jon Carin on keyboards.

== Track listing ==
All songs written and composed by Pete Townshend except where noted.

No.	Title	Length
1.	"Let My Love Open the Door"	3:32
2.	"English Boy"	6:57
3.	"Drowned"	6:17
4.	"The Shout"	6:54
5.	"I Put a Spell on You" (Screamin' Jay Hawkins)	3:52
6.	"Cut My Hair"	4:26
7.	"Sheraton Gibson"	3:08
8.	"I'm One"	5:07
9.	"Heart to Hang Onto"	5:09
10.	"O'Parvardigar"	7:14
11.	"A Legal Matter"	3:12
12.	"A Friend is a Friend"	7:51
13.	"I Am an Animal"	6:43
14.	"All Shall Be Well"	5:45
15.	"Slit Skirts"	5:25
16.	"Eyesight to the Blind" (Sonny Boy Williamson II)	2:12
17.	"Driftin' Blues" (Johnny Moore's Three Blazers)	2:57
18.	"Now and Then"	4:47
19.	"Rough Boys"	6:34
20.	"I'm a Boy"	5:07
21.	"Magic Bus"	8:30
