= Scooped =

Scooped may refer to:

- Scooped (album), a Pete Townshend album
- Scooped, an episode of Toad Patrol
- Scoop (news)
