= Andrew Wilde (actor) =

English actor

Andrew Wilde is an English actor, known for his role as Tillotson in the 1984 film Nineteen Eighty-Four. He also appeared in the Pete Townshend short film, White City: The Music Movie.

In 2011, he featured in the first and second season of Game of Thrones.

== Filmography ==
Year	Title	Role	Notes
1984	Champions	Graham	
1984	The Bounty	McKoy	
1984	Nineteen Eighty-Four	Tillotson	
1985	White City: The Music Movie	Jim	
1987	A Month in the Country	Shop Assistant	
1989	The Firm	Oboe	
1989	Murder on Line One		
1989	Inspector Morse	Edward Manley	"The Secret of Bay 5B"
2011–2012	Game of Thrones	Tobho Mott	2 episodes
