= Live: La Jolla Playhouse 2001 =

Live album by Pete Townshend
- Released: November 23, 2001 (United Kingdom)
- Recorded: June 22 & 23, 2001
- Genre: Rock
- Label: Eel Pie Records

Pete Townshend chronology
The Oceanic Concerts (2001)	Live: La Jolla Playhouse 2001 (2001)	Scoop 3 (2001)

Professional ratings
Review scores
Source	Rating
AllMusic	4/5 stars

Live: La Jolla Playhouse 2001 In June 2001 Pete Townshend performed two fundraising shows at the intimate La Jolla Playhouse in San Diego. The Playhouse was the same venue where the musical Tommy was first staged prior to moving on to Broadway. The shows raised around $300,000. Townshend performed solo and the small theatre atmosphere led to a 'Storytellers' type of show. The style of the show and the different set lists on both nights provided a unique dialogue. Music from the concerts was released on November 23, 2001, as two CD sets.

== 22/06/01 Disc 1 Track listing ==
1. "Pinball Wizard"
2. "Let My Love Open the Door"
3. "Heart To Hang Onto"
4. "Cut My Hair"
5. "Slit Skirts"
6. "Drowned"
7. "Greyhound Girl"
8. "Tattoo"
9. "The Sea Refuses No River"

== 22/06/01 Disc 2 Track listing ==
1. "Saint James Infirmary"
2. "Eminence Front"
3. "Won't Get Fooled Again"
4. "Behind Blue Eyes"
5. "Won't Get Fooled Again (Electric)"

== 23/06/01 Disc 1 Track listing ==
1. "Pinball Wizard"
2. "Let My Love Open the Door"
3. "Heart To Hang Onto"
4. "Cut My Hair"
5. "Slit Skirts"
6. "Drowned"
7. "Greyhound Girl"
8. "Tattoo"
9. "Collings"
10. "Eminence Front"

== 23/06/01 Disc 2 Track listing ==
1. "Sheraton Gibson"
2. "Won't Get Fooled Again"
3. "I'm One"
4. "Behind Blue Eyes"
5. "Driftin' Blues"
6. "Eyesight to the Blind"
7. "Won't Get Fooled Again (Electric)"
