= With Love (Pete Townshend album) =

Compilation album by various
- Released: March 1976
- Recorded: UK
- Genre: Rock
- Labels: Universal Spiritual League; Eel Pie

Pete Townshend chronology
Who Came First (1972)	With Love (1976)	Rough Mix (1977)

With Love is a 1976 album featuring the Who's Pete Townshend and others that is dedicated to their spiritual mentor Meher Baba.

Other appearances and backup artists include Billy Nicholls, Steve Humphries, Ronnie Lane, Ron Wood, Ron Geesin, Bruce Rowland, Lol Benbow, Paul Wyld, Peter Hope-Evans (of Medicine Head), Peter Banks (ex-Yes), Sydney Foxx, among others.

Other tribute albums which were produced by Pete Townshend and dedicated to Meher Baba include Happy Birthday, I Am, and Avatar (a compilation of the previous three albums, later released as Jai Baba).

== Track listing ==
All songs written by Pete Townshend, except where noted.

No.	Title	Writer(s)	Length
1.	"Hail Avatar Meher Baba" (Last Qawali Group)
2.	"Give It Up"	Billy Nicholls, Steve Humphries, McSmith, Alan Murphy
3.	"Without Your Love" (Billy Nicholls with Pete Townshend)
4.	"His Hands"
5.	"Just for a Moment"	Ronnie Lane, Ron Wood, Bruce Rowland
6.	"Baba Blues"	Lol Benbow
7.	"Meher" (Paul Wyld with Pete Townshend)
8.	"Contact" (Medicine Head)
9.	"Gotta Know Ya"	Billy Nicholls, Steve Humphries, Sammy Mitchell, George Butler
10.	"Sleeping Dog"
11.	"All God's Mornings"	Sydney Foxx, Peter Banks
12.	"Lantern Cabin"

== Personnel ==
- Peter Townshend - guitars, drums, synthesized flute, synthesizer
- Caleb Quaye - guitars, bass, drums
- Billy Nichols - acoustic guitar, vocals
- Ronnie Lane - bass guitar
- George Turner - bass guitar
- Ian McLagan - piano
- Bernie Schwartz - piano
- Roger Seiji - Hammond organ
- Dave Hastlow - synthesizer
- Connie Ehmke, David Lawson - violas
- Loel Miller - cello
- Stephanie Getz - flute
- Littler Remer - clarinet
- David Overton - drums
- Judy Ardine, Neal Crockett, Carol Leigh, Duce, Sonya Lawson, Mary Lewis - vocals
- Ron Geesin - various instruments

== Bibliography ==
- Personnel : https://www.thewho.net/bootlegs/cdssolo/ptiam1.html
