= The Iron Man: The Musical by Pete Townshend =

The Iron Man: The Musical

Studio album by Pete Townshend
- Released: 27 June 1989
- Recorded: 1986–1989
- Studio: Eel Pie Studios (The Boathouse, Twickenham)
- Genre: Rock
- Length: 45:36
- Label: Atlantic (US)
- Producer: Pete Townshend

Pete Townshend chronology
Another Scoop (1987)	The Iron Man: The Musical (1989)	Psychoderelict (1993)

The Iron Man: The Musical by Pete Townshend is the sixth solo studio album by Pete Townshend of the Who, released in 1989 as a concept album adaptation of Ted Hughes' science fiction novel The Iron Man (1968). The album features vocal performances from Roger Daltrey, Deborah Conway, John Lee Hooker, and Nina Simone, who all perform characters from Hughes' novel.

Two songs found Townshend reunited with his bandmates from the Who, singer Roger Daltrey and bassist John Entwistle, who perform on "Dig" and "Fire". The Who would later perform "Dig" live during their 1989 reunion tour).

"A Friend Is a Friend" and "I Won't Run Anymore" were commercially released as singles; "Fire" was issued as a promo-only single in the United States. Cashbox said "A Friend is a Friend" was a highlight on the album, and "finds Pete in an uplifting vein, with falsetto vocals and strummed guitar."

A stage version was mounted at the Young Vic theatre in London in 1993. On the strength of the theatrical production, Warner Bros. optioned the story for a film which was eventually adapted into the animated film The Iron Giant (1999). Townshend received an executive-producer credit on the film.

== Critical reception ==
Professional ratings
Review scores
Source	Rating
AllMusic	2/5 stars
Encyclopedia of Popular Music	2/5 stars
The Great Rock Discography	4/10
Hi-Fi News & Record Review	A*:1/2
Red Deer Advocate	2.5/5 stars
Rolling Stone	1/5 stars
Telegram & Gazette	2/5 stars

On release, The Iron Man received mixed reviews from music critics, some of whom lamented Townshend recording a Broadway-style musical. David Hiltbrand of People Weekly described it as "turgid fare", with the majority of the songs stunted and charmless. Fred Dellar of Hi-Fi News & Record Review compared the album to Andrew Lloyd Webber and Broadway, saying it "could be just the rock opera to help Pete grab a Tony." He felt it was not a total musical success, criticising some parts for being laden with "so much thrash, crash and choral capering", with one or two songs "[seeming] to disappear without trace halfway through a performance." Dellar did however praise Simone and Hooker's performances as well as Townshend's authoritative guitar playing, concluding that "the concept's interesting and the music has its share of merits." Craig S. Semon of the Telegram & Gazette criticised the rhythmic schemes and lyrics for being "extremely simple" and compared it to Styx's "laughable" Kilroy Was Here (1983).

Rolling Stone considered it a Townshend solo album "in the most liberal sense of the term", noting that it is unusually short on roaring guitar work, "power-chord rage" and "rock'n'roll wham" as well as harsh self-examination, instead exploring compassionate, optimistic themes. The reviewer stressed that The Iron Man is neither "lightweight art pop" nor a follow-up to Empty Glass, but rather "Pete Townshend's My Generation for the next generation." The Oakland Tribune considered The Iron Man to be Townshend's "tightest and most accessible work in years", whereas Guitar Player deemed it a "perfectly executed pop album" that contains some of the guitarist's "most adventurous playing in almost seven years." Keith L. Thomas of The Atlanta Journal called it "a musical and lyrical tour de force" and "a soulfully spirited work of art". The Daily Herald critic Jim Kelton found the song cycle to be "some kind of great rock 'n' roll album", though faulted its confusing plot and "pseudo-poetic jive", calling its arty reach "pretentious".

In The New Rolling Stone Album Guide (2004), a contributor panned The Iron Man as "a promising idea gone disastrously wrong", describing the songs as tedious and the production as "an instant headache", adding that the guest vocalists' non-committal vocals project an air of regret. In a similarly negative retrospective review, Stephen Thomas Erlewine of AllMusic noted the talent but lamented the "obvious and overblown" arrangements and the lack of compelling melodies, making The Iron Man "an overwrought, ambitious failure." Conversely, Colin Larkin opines in The Encyclopedia of Popular Music (1997) that, although flawed, the album's artistic ambition is undeniable, "as if emphasizing Townshend's role as one of rock's most literate and pensive talents."

== Track listing ==
All tracks are written by Pete Townshend, except where noted.

1. "I Won't Run Any More" – 4:51 Vocals by Pete Townshend with Deborah Conway
2. "Over the Top" – 3:31 Vocals by John Lee Hooker
3. "Man Machines" – 0:42 Vocals by Simon Townshend
4. "Dig" – 4:07 Performed by the Who
5. "A Friend Is a Friend" – 4:44 Vocals by Pete Townshend
6. "I Eat Heavy Metal" – 4:01 Vocals by John Lee Hooker
7. "All Shall Be Well" – 4:02 Vocals by Pete Townshend with Deborah Conway and Chyna
8. "Was There Life" – 4:19 Vocals by Pete Townshend
9. "Fast Food" – 4:26 Vocals by Nina Simone
10. "A Fool Says..." – 2:51 Vocals by Pete Townshend
11. "Fire" (Arthur Brown, Vincent Crane, Mike Finesilver, Peter Ker) – 3:47 Performed by the Who
12. "New Life/Reprise" – 6:00 Vocals by Chyna with Pete Townshend and Nicola Emmanuel. Contains small extract of a live performance of "Magic Bus"

=== Bonus tracks from the 2006 US Hip-O Records release ===
13. "Dig" (Simon Townshend vocal version) – 4:09
14. "Man Machines" (long version) – 4:34
15. "I Eat Heavy Metal" (demo) – 4:04

=== Bonus tracks from the 2006 Japanese Imperial release ===
13. "A Friend Is a Friend" (live at the Fillmore West, 1996)
14. "All Shall Be Well" (live at the Fillmore West, 1996)

== Non-album tracks ==
1. "Real World" (instrumental released on 12" and CD singles of "A Friend Is a Friend", a different mix of it was on Scoop 3 in 2001)
2. "Penny Drop" (appeared on the Timothy White Radio Show; promo copies of the interview were pressed on vinyl by DIR Broadcasting)
3. "Dig" (demo released on the 1989 UK CD single of "I Won't Run Anymore")
4. "Iron Man Recitative", "Can You Really Dance?", and "Man and Machines (demo)" appeared on Scoop 3 in 2001
5. "Dig" (concert version appeared on the Who's 1989 reunion tour concert album Join Together)

== Musician credits ==
Adapted from the CD liner notes.

Character voices

- Hogarth: Pete Townshend
- The Vixen: Deborah Conway
- The Iron Man: John Lee Hooker
- The Space Dragon: Nina Simone
- Hogarth's Father: Roger Daltrey
- The Crow: Chyna
- The Jay: Nicola Emmanuelle
- The Frog: Billy Nicholls
- The Owl: Simon Townshend
- The Badger: Cleveland Watkiss
- Choir vocals: Gina Foster, Derek Green, Janice Hoyte, Ruby James, Julian Littman, Michael Nicholls, Earnestine Pearce, Raymond Simpson, plus children from St. Stevens and Orleans schools.

Instrumentalists

- Pete Townshend — guitars, keyboards, Synclavier programming
- Jules Bowen — Synclavier
- Simon Phillips, Charlie Morgan — drums
- Chucho Merchán, John Entwistle — bass guitar
- John "Rabbit" Bundrick — piano
- Peter Beachill, John Barclay — brass
- Patrick Clahar — saxophone
- Pat Halling — strings, string arrangements, string leader
- Billy Nichols — vocal choir arrangements
