= The Oceanic Concerts =

Live album by Pete Townshend and Raphael Rudd
- Released: 2001 (UK)
- Recorded: UK
- Genre: Rock
- Label: Eel Pie
- Producer: Pete Townshend

Pete Townshend and Raphael Rudd chronology
O' Parvardigar (2001)	The Oceanic Concerts (2001)	Live: La Jolla Playhouse 2001 (2001)

The Oceanic Concerts is a collaboration album with Pete Townshend and Raphael Rudd that was first publicly released in 2001.

Townshend sings a selection of Who standards ("The Seeker", "Bargain", "Drowned", even the comical "Tattoo") as Rudd accompanies him on piano and harp. Rudd, a harpist and pianist, had been a member of the band Renaissance between 1984 and 1987. He died shortly after the release of this recording in April 2002.

The concerts were recorded around Christmas in 1979 and 1980 according to the liner notes by Rudd.

== Track list ==
1. Raphael Rudd - "Raga"
2. Pete Townshend - "Drowned"
3. Pete Townshend - "The Seeker"
4. Raphael Rudd - "Magic Grace"
5. Raphael Rudd - "Who Is Meher Baba"
6. Pete Townshend and Raphael Rudd - "The Ferryman"
7. Raphael Rudd - "Kitty's Theme"
8. Pete Townshend and Raphael Rudd - "A Little Is Enough"
9. Raphael Rudd - "Contact in Solitude"
10. Pete Townshend and Raphael Rudd - "Sleeping Dog"
11. Raphael Rudd - "Sound Barrier"
12. Pete Townshend - "Bargain"
13. Raphael Rudd - "Longing for the Beloved"
14. Pete Townshend and Raphael Rudd - "Tattoo"
15. Pete Townshend and Raphael Rudd - "Let My Love Open the Door"
16. Pete Townshend and Raphael Rudd - "Awakening"
17. Raphael Rudd - "Western (American) Arti"
18. Pete Townshend and Raphael Rudd - "O'Parvardigar"
