= Cliff Townshend =

English jazz musician (1916–1986)

- Born: Clifford Blandford Townshend; 28 January 1916
- Died: 29 June 1986 (aged 70)
- Genre: Jazz
- Occupation: Musician
- Instruments: Saxophone; clarinet
- Years active: 1932–1965
- Formerly of: The Squadronaires

Clifford Blandford Townshend (28 January 1916 – 29 June 1986) was an English jazz musician who played saxophone in the Royal Air Force Dance Orchestra, popularly known as The Squadronaires. He also played clarinet in the band. His eldest son, Pete, gained renown as guitarist and principal composer for the band The Who.

== Biography ==
Cliff Townshend was born to Dorothy and Horace Townshend on 28 January 1916. The couple married in 1910 in Brentford and were both musicians who played in Concert Party shows for the troops during World War I. Townshend showed an early interest in music and was in a band by 1932 while attending Latymer Upper School in Hammersmith, London. He was expelled from school for playing in his teens at "Bottle Parties", adult parties that involved smoking and drinking as well as innovative popular music. He played at such venues as the Stork Club and with the Billy Wiltshire Band. He made some of his first recordings with the band of drummer Joe Daniels at Abbey Road.

In the 1930s, Townshend became a Blackshirt in Oswald Mosley's British Union of Fascists. In 1940, Townshend enlisted in the Royal Air Force. Before ending up with The Squadronaires, he played in a number of small bands as part of his duties, as the RAF high command recognized the morale value of popular music. During the early days of the war, he met Betty Dennis, who enlisted in 1941 when she was sixteen. She drove a truck and sang with RAF bands. They married 16 April 1944 in Pontypool, South Wales, where they were stationed. By this time, Townshend had achieved the rank of Lance Corporal.

Their first son, Peter, was born 19 May 1945 (the same month Germany surrendered) in West London in Nazareth House, an annex of Middlesex Hospital. The family moved into a war-damaged house in Acton, and Betty Townshend ended her singing career but continued to assist with office work and management for The Squadronaires. The enforced separation caused by the band's continued tours caused stresses in the marriage; however, the couple sometimes took their son and went together on the band's tours. In 1952, the Squadronaires began a regular summer engagement at the Palace Ballroom in Douglas, Isle of Man, which continued for about ten years.

In 1956, Cliff Townshend released a solo recording of "Unchained Melody" which made him something of a pop star, and royalties from the record were welcome. Cliff and Betty Townshend's second son, Paul Townshend, was born in 1957, and the family moved to a larger flat in Ealing Common. In the same year, Townshend took his son Pete to see the film Rock Around the Clock (1956) with Bill Haley, and then to a live Bill Haley concert at the Regal Cinema at Marble Arch. Townshend thought the music "had some swing". The couple's third son, Simon Townshend, was born on 10 October 1960. Pete Townshend dedicated his 1987 album Another Scoop to the memory of his father.
