= Deep End (band) =

British supergroup

- Origin: London, England
- Genres: Rock
- Years active: 1985–1986
- Labels: Atco; Eel Pie
- Past members: Pete Townshend; David Gilmour; Simon Phillips; Chucho Merchán; Jody Linscott; John "Rabbit" Bundrick; Peter Hope Evans; Billy Nicholls; Cleveland Watkiss; Chyna; Kick Horns

Deep End was a short-lived supergroup founded by guitarist Pete Townshend of the Who and featuring David Gilmour of Pink Floyd. The group also included drummer Simon Phillips, bassist Chucho Merchán, percussionist Jody Linscott, keyboardist John "Rabbit" Bundrick, harmonica player Peter Hope Evans, vocalists Billy Nicholls, Cleveland Watkiss, Chyna, and a brass ensemble called the Kick Horns.

== Performance history ==
In 1985, the group performed two concerts for the Double O charity at London's Brixton Academy (a third was cancelled due to poor ticket sales). The concerts were later released as the albums Deep End Live! (1986) and Live: Brixton Academy '85 (2004). The band also performed a concert at the Midem trade fair in France and appeared on The Tube. Townshend's daughter Emma performed as a guest vocalist at the London concerts.

Many of the same musicians and vocalists also appeared with Townshend for later tours and performances and also with the Who for selected engagements.

In August 2016, it was announced that a Deep End appearance on the German television show Rockpalast from 1986 would be released on CD and DVD.

== Band members ==
- Pete Townshend – guitars
- David Gilmour – guitars
- Simon Phillips – drums, percussion
- Chucho Merchán – bass guitar
- Jody Linscott – percussion
- John "Rabbit" Bundrick – keyboards
- Peter Hope Evans – harmonica
- Billy Nicholls – vocals
- Cleveland Watkiss – vocals
- Chyna – vocals
- Kick Horns – horns
