= Love on the Air =

Single by Pink Floyd's guitarist, David Gilmour

Single by David Gilmour

from the album About Face
- B-side: "Let's Get Metaphysical"
- Released: 24 April 1984
- Recorded: 1983
- Studio: Pathé Marconi Studio (Boulogne-Billancourt, France)
- Genre: Soft rock
- Length: 4:19
- Label: Harvest
- Songwriters: Pete Townshend; David Gilmour
- Producers: Bob Ezrin; David Gilmour

David Gilmour singles chronology
"Blue Light" (1984)	"Love on the Air" (1984)	"On an Island" (2006)

"Love on the Air" is a song by Pink Floyd's guitarist, David Gilmour. The track was released as the second single from his second solo studio album About Face (1984).

The lyrics to the track were written by the Who's main songwriter Pete Townshend, and the music was by Gilmour himself. The lyrics for the track were written within a day, after Gilmour had asked for Townshend's help. Townshend had also written the lyrics to another track from About Face, "All Lovers are Deranged".

The single was only released in the UK, but sales were poor, despite the single also being available as a 7" picture disc.

Gilmour performed the track live on his 1984 tour, and in 1985 as a member of Townshend's supergroup, Deep End, a recording of which was released on Townshend's live album Live: Brixton Academy '85 (2004).
