= Jai Baba =

Compilation album by Pete Townshend
- Released: 2001
- Genre: Rock
- Producer: Pete Townshend

Pete Townshend chronology
Live: The Fillmore (2000)	Jai Baba (2001)	O' Parvardigar (2001)

Jai Baba is a 2001 compilation album by Pete Townshend dedicated to Meher Baba. The album features music from three Meher Baba tribute albums featuring Townshend in the 1970s, Happy Birthday, I Am, and With Love.
