= Happy Birthday (Pete Townshend album) =

Studio album by Pete Townshend, Ronnie Lane, Mike Da Costa, Ron Geesin
- Released: February 1970
- Recorded: UK
- Genre: Rock
- Labels: Universal Spiritual League; Eel Pie

Pete Townshend chronology
Happy Birthday (1970)	I Am (1972)

Happy Birthday is a collaboration album by Pete Townshend, the guitarist for the Who and friends, including Ronnie Lane. It was pressed and released in 1970 by Universal Spiritual League.

The album was originally released in February 1970 (in commemoration of Meher Baba's birthday on 25 February) as the first in a series of tribute albums dedicated to Pete Townshend's spiritual mentor Meher Baba.

Only about 2,500 copies were pressed in the original 1970 issue.

The album was reissued in similar numbers in 1977.

Later albums by Pete Townshend and friends dedicated to Meher Baba included I Am, With Love, and Avatar (a compilation of the previous three albums, later released as Jai Baba). Several songs from Happy Birthday and I Am reappeared on Pete Townshend's 1972 solo album Who Came First.

== Track listing ==
Side one
No.	Title	Artist	Length
1.	"Content" (words by Maud Kennedy)	Pete Townshend
2.	"Evolution" (words and music by Ronnie Lane)	Townshend with Ronnie Lane
3.	"Day of Silence" (words and music by Townshend)	Townshend
4.	"Alan Cohen Speaks" (Sitar accompaniment by Vytas Serelis)	Meher Baba's Universal Players
5.	"Mary Jane" (words by Michael Westlake, music by Townshend)	Townshend
6.	"Alan Cohen Speaks" (words by Meher Baba)	Meher Baba's Universal Players
7.	"The Seeker" (version, words and music by Townshend)	Townshend

Side two
No.	Title	Artist	Length
8.	"Begin the Beguine" (words and music by Cole Porter)	Townshend
9.	"With a Smile Up His Nose They Entered" (music by Ron Geesin)	Ron Geesin
10.	"The Love Man" (words and music by Townshend)	Townshend
11.	"Meditation" (words by Mike Da Costa)	Mike Da Costa
