= Double O (charity) =

Charity established by the Who

Double 'O' Charity, Ltd.
- Founded: 1976
- Founder: The Who; Pete Townshend
- Type: Charity
- Purpose: Poverty, health and education
- Location: London, England
- Region served: United Kingdom and overseas
- Method: Private disbursal
- Owner: Pete Townshend
- Website: TheWho.com

Double 'O' (Double 'O' Charity, Ltd.) is a charity established by the rock group the Who in 1976. Operation of the charity was assumed by Pete Townshend in 1983 when band initially retired from active touring. The trust disburses funds for such causes as relief of drug and alcohol addiction, domestic violence and sexual abuse. It also provides funds for music education, emergency disaster relief and young people's prison reform.

== History ==
The primary objective of the trust is to make grants towards the relief of poverty, preservation of health and the advancement of education. Double 'O' was originally established to help fund the Chiswick women's refuges founded by family care activist Erin Pizzey. Later The Who performed concerts to benefit Nordoff-Robbins Music Therapy. After Townshend took over Double 'O' in 1983, he used it for support of drug rehab charities, the Prince's Trust and Rock Against Racism.

Townshend formed the band Deep End in 1985 and put on two charity concerts at the Brixton Academy through Double 'O' Promotions. In 1986 Double 'O' Productions put on the Columbian Volcano Relief Concert, and in 2000, the charity held an Internet auction to benefit the Mozambique earthquake disaster. In 1999 the charity made a large donation to the Landsdowne House Alcohol Advisory Unit (The Chaucer Clinic in West Ealing). In 2005 The Who performed in New York City raising funds for Double 'O' as part of the children's charity event Four Seasons of Hope, sponsored by Samsung.

Other beneficiaries of the charity include: the Teenage Cancer Trust, Arvon Foundation, Bedales School, Chemical Dependency, Children of Chiswick, Granada Disaster, Lifeworks Community, Orleans House Gallery, Oxford University, the Promise, Spirit of Recovery and Yabsley Exhibitions. In 2008 the band raised funds for California charity K9 Connection, auctioning off the chance to be a Who roadie for a day. In 2009 a portion of The Who's Melbourne Grand Prix concert revenues in Australia was donated for brush fire relief.

After 1989 the funds available increased because of The Who's return to active touring. Proceeds of The Who's Encore Series CD sales begun in 2002 go to the Double 'O' Charity. In recent years a portion of revenue generation has moved to the Internet.

== Disbursements ==
In 2010, the charity trust had disbursed about £4,000,000 since inception, and has been responsible for the disbursal of a similar amount through Double 'O' Promotions.
