= Deep End Live! =

Live album by Pete Townshend and Deep End
- Released: August 1986
- Recorded: 1–2 November 1985
- Venue: Brixton Academy (London)
- Genre: Rock
- Label: Atco (United States)
- Producer: Matt Kent; Nick Goderson; Pete Townshend

Pete Townshend and Deep End chronology
White City: A Novel (1985)	Deep End Live! (1986)	Another Scoop (1987)

Deep End Live! is an album containing excerpts of the live performance by Pete Townshend's Deep End band, at the Brixton Academy in London, England on 1–2 November 1985. In addition to Townshend, the band included Pink Floyd guitarist David Gilmour, drummer Simon Phillips, bassist Chucho Merchan, keyboardist John "Rabbit" Bundrick, percussionist Jody Linscott, harmonica player Peter Hope Evans, the horn section Kick Horns and backing vocalists. The album was originally released in the U.S. in August 1986 by Atco Records.

Apart from The Who and Townshend's solo repertoire, Townshend plays the covers "Barefootin'" by New Orleans singer Robert Parker, "I Put a Spell on You" by Screamin' Jay Hawkins, "Save It for Later" by the Beat, and Sonny Boy Williamson's "Eyesight to the Blind", already recorded by the Who for Tommy, is played here with an arrangement close to the original version.

"After the Fire" is a song written by Townshend that originally appeared on Roger Daltrey's solo album Under a Raging Moon, and later on the Who's live album Blues to the Bush.

The full concert was later released as Live: Brixton Academy '85.

== Track listing ==
All songs written by Pete Townshend unless otherwise noted.

Side one

1. "Barefootin'" (Robert Parker) - 3:09
2. "After the Fire" - 4:36
3. "Behind Blue Eyes" - 3:40
4. "Stop Hurting People" - 5:09
5. "I'm One" - 2:36

Side two

1. "I Put a Spell on You" (Jay Hawkins) - 4:03
2. "Save It for Later" (Roger Charlery, Andy Cox, Everett Morton, David Steele, Dave Wakeling) - 4:10
3. "Pinball Wizard" - 3:00
4. "A Little Is Enough" - 5:20
5. "Eyesight to the Blind" (Sonny Boy Williamson) - 3:02

2006 bonus tracks

11. "Magic Bus" - 4:03
12. "Won't Get Fooled Again" - 6:08
