= Psychoderelict =

Studio album by Pete Townshend
- Released: 15 June 1993
- Recorded: 1990–1993
- Genre: Rock
- Length: 63:12
- Label: Atlantic (US)
- Producer: Pete Townshend

Pete Townshend chronology
The Iron Man: The Musical by Pete Townshend (1989)	Psychoderelict (1993)	The Best of Pete Townshend (1996)

Psychoderelict is the seventh studio album by the English musician Pete Townshend. Some characters and issues presented in this work were continued in Townshend's later opus The Boy Who Heard Music, first presented on the Who's eleventh studio album Endless Wire (2006) and then adapted as a rock musical. It stands as Townshend's most recent solo studio album to date.

== History ==
Released in 1993, Psychoderelict is a rock opera conceived by Townshend in 1991 as the follow-up to The Iron Man (1989), but despite having recorded several demos, a bicycle accident in September 1991 forced him to delay work on the album until his wrist was able to heal properly. It is structured more like a radio play than the more "traditional" rock operas Townshend had recorded both with the Who (1969's Tommy, 1973's Quadrophenia and the unreleased Lifehouse album) and as a solo artist (1985's White City and The Iron Man).

The album's central character is Ray High (real name Raymond Highsmith), a '60s rock star who has dwindled and turned into an alcoholic recluse. Ray's manager, Rastus Knight, worried at the rocker's dwindling bank account, attempts unsuccessfully to talk him into recording new material. Rastus complains about it to radio pop-music reporter Ruth Streeting, an outspoken critic of Ray's. Ruth says she has an idea to "fire him up" and Rastus offers her a cut of the profits if she can do it.

Ruth sends Ray a letter posing as a 15-year-old girl named Rosalind Nathan, who dreams of being a star. She includes in her letter an erotic Polaroid of herself lying naked on her mother's grave when she was 12. Ray responds to her immediately, calling the photograph "stunning" and telling her that they both "share complicated problems." He offers to help her if she will keep it a secret. He and "Rosalind" exchange several letters, where Ray opens his heart about his insecurity, his life's past tragedies, and his insights into the relationships between the performers, the public, and the press. He sends her a tape of "Flame," a song he wrote for his secret "Gridlife" project. In his last letter he talks about Ruth Streeting, calling her "symbolic of the entire establishment" and saying "her disgust is the greatest motivator of the artist in me." He confesses that he has fallen in love with her. Ruth, now sleeping with Rastus, laughs about it while being spanked.

Ruth publishes the photograph in her "porno pen-pal story," calling Ray a slime ball who took advantage of a young fan's innocence to solicit the photograph and "test out his weird theories." The resulting controversy drives the re-release of Ray's records to huge sales. Rastus is delighted. "Rosalind's" version of "Flame," off of her new Ruth Streeting-produced album, becomes a huge hit. Ruth promotes Rosalind as a "brilliant songwriter" while keeping the real writer of the song a secret, even from Rastus.

Ruth receives her cut of the profits, and Rastus is in seventh heaven, once again rolling in money. Ray, upset about Ruth's exposé, confronts them both. Ruth accuses Ray of "manipulating" Rosalind. Rastus says it all worked out for the best, they're back in calculator country. Ray insists that he was helping Rosalind deal with a problem. Ruth insists Rosalind never had a problem and all Ray did was "help her become a fucking star."

In a meeting with Ruth at a bar, Raymond springs the surprise that he has known all along that Ruth and Rosalind are one and the same. It is heavily implied that Ruth fakes being attracted to Ray so that she can manoeuvre him into writing new material. Ruth, littering her language with endearments, is now producing the "Gridlife" album, which contains a sample of the Who's famous "Baba O'Riley."

At the end of the play, Ray says that "Gridlife" was a vision, not a fiction, and that the apocalypse it foresaw is near. He wonders what happened to peace, love, and "all that hippie shit."

== Commentary ==
The album is a critical, perhaps satirical look at Townshend's own life: the dedication of his music to Meher Baba's teachings, and his Lifehouse project, which closely resembles the Gridlife project on which the Ray High character is working. The album also makes use of Townshend's earlier song "Who Are You" which is sampled on the track "Meher Baba M4 (Signal Box)".

Only one single proper was released from the album: "English Boy", both non-dialogue and dialogue versions, was released with a variety of B-sides and non-album songs, including "Psycho Montage" (a collection of dialogue from the album) and "Electronic Wizardry" (written and recorded in 1970 as a potential track for The Who's unreleased Lifehouse album), as well as demos for "Flame" and "Early Morning Dreams". "Don't Try to Make Me Real", "Outlive the Dinosaur" and "Now and Then" were all issued to radio stations with dialogue excised. A previously unreleased track, "Uneasy Street", was later released on the compilation album The Best of Pete Townshend (1996).

After slow sales of the initial dialogue intense release, a "music only" version was issued, though sales and reviews were still disappointing. Fan reception was divided: some felt that Townshend's ideas were too pretentious even for him, while others have embraced it as the first worthy concept since Quadrophenia. To date, it remains the final Pete Townshend solo album of all-original material, although further compilations have surfaced.

The Ray High character would resurface in 2005 as the central character in The Boy Who Heard Music, a novella written by Townshend for his Web site; and again the following year in Townshend's mini rock opera adaptation of that story, Wire & Glass. That mini-opera would become the centrepiece of the Who's comeback album Endless Wire.

== Meher Baba instrumentals ==
There are four instrumental tracks which originated from Townshend's 1970–1971 synthesizer demos for the Who's fifth studio album Who's Next (1971). Some of these experiments were released as "Baba O'Riley" that year and as "Who Are You" in 1978. On Psychoderelict, the Meher Baba instrumentals appear in this order:

- "Meher Baba M3": features a hypnotic synthesizer backing that may have been created specifically for this album. During this song, Ray High can be heard on a tape machine, listening through songs he had demoed as early as 1970 (an obvious allusion to Townshend trawling through his archives for Psychoderelict).
- "Meher Baba M4 (Signal Box)": a heavier track that sounds similar to "Who Are You", though this song undoubtedly features overdubs recorded by the musicians Townshend employed for Psychoderelict.
- "Meher Baba M5 (Vivaldi)": an upbeat arrangement which draws its inspiration from classical composer Vivaldi.
- "Baba O'Riley (demo)": a demo recording of the classic Who track, this time with the "Irish jig" finale that would later feature a violin solo.

== Critical reception ==
Professional ratings
Review scores
Source	Rating
AllMusic	2.5/5 stars
Encyclopedia of Popular Music	3/5 stars
The Great Rock Discography	4/10
NME	7/10
Rolling Stone	3.5/5 stars
The Rolling Stone Album Guide	1/5 stars

Psychoderelict received critical acclaim. In his NME review, Paul Moody enjoyed the inclusion of Lifehouse leftovers as well as several new songs and "a load of brilliant pre-techno 'Baba O'Reilly' synth bleeping that fills the gaps". Moody ultimately deemed Psychoderelict interesting and "dazzlingly ambitious", despite several songs being weaker than the concept, and characterised it as "pop as art, just like the Ealing Art School intellectual always wanted." Calling it "a sci-fi radio play, substituting an Orwellian air of virtual-reality apocalypse for Tommy's pinball pathway to glory", Rolling Stone critic Paul Evans found Psychoderelict to be a dark, agonized work that "sputters and bellows, but its clangor gives it power." Evans added that, despite its bombast, the story allowed Townshend to explore familiar themes, and that dialogue and sound effects "meld with songs to fashion a kind of aural movie; it's a collision that underscores one of Psychoderelict's themes, the tension between truth and technology."

The Press Democrat's reviewer called it an unconventional, tongue-in-cheek audio play that is "refreshing on first inspection" and which, by mixing music and spoken dialogue, conceptually recalls both The Who Sell Out (1967) (with its fake radio advertisements) and Tommy, while musically evoking Who's Next through its "its warm, danse-macabre keyboards sounds", although the reviewer lamented the music and libretto being "so closely interwoven." In a negative review for Melody Maker, Taylor Parkes felt the album was "full of balding, audibly bearded dad-rock, making it sound 'intelligent' and 'daring' by playing what sounds like a particularly laughable Radio 4 play over the bits where he isn't singing".

Retrospectively, a contributor to The Rolling Stone Album Guide (2004) describes Psychoderelict as "even worse" than its 1989 predecessor, The Iron Man, calling it "a brittle, slapdash radio-drama-plus-songs about an aging rock star who's still obsessed with a project he failed to realize decades earlier (do you get it? huh?)", and adding that the music-only version, issued after the original version flopped, "didn't help". In The Great Rock Discography (2006), Martin C. Strong calls it "a rock opera of sorts updated for the 90's". Greg Parto of AllMusic believes it contains Townshend's "hardest-rocking songs" since his earlier solo album Empty Glass (1980), and singled out "Meher Baba M4" as the best of the three synth instrumentals recorded in tribute to Meher Baba. Creem critic Jeffrey Morgan calls it a "theatrically therapeutic and rancorous radio play" and felt the original version, with spoken dialogue, is superior for being "brutally unvarnished [...] with all the self-abusive and self-aware dialogue intact that you'll want to hear. Sure it's hard to listen to, but that's a small price to pay if progress means that Pete's now publicly punching himself instead of privately punching Ronnie Lane."

== Track listing ==
All tracks written by Pete Townshend, unless otherwise stated.

Dialogue version
No.	Title	Writer(s)	Length
1.	"English Boy"		5:07
2.	"Meher Baba M3"		3:31
3.	"Let's Get Pretentious"		3:36
4.	"Meher Baba M4 (Signal Box)"		2:23
5.	"Early Morning Dreams"		3:54
6.	"I Want That Thing"		3:58
7.	"Dialogue introduction to "Outlive the Dinosaur""		0:32
8.	"Outlive the Dinosaur"		3:24
9.	"Flame (demo version)"	Gavin Lewis, Jaz Lochrie, Josh Phillips-Gorse, Mark Brzezicki, Simon Townshend	1:07
10.	"Now and Then"		4:25
11.	"I Am Afraid"		4:34
12.	"Don't Try to Make Me Real"		2:59
13.	"Dialogue introduction to "Predictable"		0:34
14.	"Predictable"		2:16
15.	"Flame"	Lewis, Lochrie, Phillips-Gorse, Brzezicki, S. Townshend	2:41
16.	"Meher Baba M5 (Vivaldi)"		2:35
17.	"Fake It"	Pete Townshend, Billy Nicholls, Jon Astley, Jon Lind	3:29
18.	"Dialogue introduction to "Now and Then (Reprise)""		0:32
19.	"Now and Then (Reprise)"		2:57
20.	"Baba O' Riley (Demo)"		1:20
21.	"English Boy (Reprise)"		7:04

Music Only version
No.	Title	Length
1.	"English Boy"	4:49
2.	"Meher Baba M3"	3:32
3.	"Let's Get Pretentious"	3:27
4.	"Meher Baba M4 (Signal Box)"	2:24
5.	"Early Morning Dreams"	3:06
6.	"I Want That Thing"	4:04
7.	"Outlive the Dinosaur"	4:22
8.	"Now and Then"	4:12
9.	"I Am Afraid"	4:21
10.	"Don't Try to Make Me Real"	3:30
11.	"Predictable" (contains an extra verse not found on dialogue version)	3:10
12.	"Flame"	4:15
13.	"Meher Baba M5 (Vivaldi)"	2:40
14.	"Fake It"	3:38
15.	"English Boy (Reprise)"	7:05

=== Bonus tracks from the 2006 Hip-O Records reissue ===
Disc 1 (also features dialogue version of Psychoderelict)
No.	Title	Writer(s)	Length
22.	"Psychomontage"	Pete Townshend, Billy Nicholls, Jon Lind	12:37

Disc 2 (also features music-only version of Psychoderelict)
No.	Title	Writer(s)	Length
16.	"English Boy" (long intro)		6:41
17.	"Early Morning Dreams" (demo – alternate vocal)		3:36
18.	"Uneasy Street"	Pete Townshend, Billy Nicholls, Jon Lind	4:53
19.	"There Is No Message in a Broken Heart"		3.43

== Personnel ==
Credited as Psychoderelict family:

- Jeremy Allom
- Jon Astley
- Richard Barnes
- Paul Bonnick
- Ian Broudie
- Mark Brzezicki
- John "Rabbit" Bundrick
- Chyna
- Allan Corduner
- Bruce Davies
- Barry Diament Audio
- Julie Duff of Anne Henderson Casting
- Andrew Eccles
- Nick Goderson
- Linal Haft
- Deirdre Harrison
- Nicky Brown
- Steve Hill
- Peter Hope-Evans
- Icon Communications
- Nicola Joss
- Kick Horns
- Roger Knapp
- John Labanowski
- Jamie Lane
- Dee Lewis
- Gavin Lewis
- Jody Linscott
- Jaz Lochrie
- Andy Macpherson
- Billy Nicholls
- Michael Nicholls
- Tessa Niles
- Phil Palmer
- Josh Phillips-Gorse
- Bob Pridden
- Jan Ravens
- Simon Rogers
- Adam Seymour
- Paul Stevens
- Paul Townshend
- Simon Townshend
- Nigel Walker
- Cleveland Watkiss
- Suzy Webb
- Lee Whitlock
- Paul "Tubbs" Williams
- Ian Wilson

== Live in New York featuring Psychoderelict ==
A performance from Townshend's first North American solo tour was broadcast live from the theatre of the Brooklyn Academy of Music in New York in August 1993. The concert was in three parts: an opening session of eight songs, a complete performance of Psychoderelict and an encore of a further five songs.

The performance was featured by PBS Great Performances and directed by Richard Barnes and Bruce Gowers. It was later issued as a double CD called Pete Townshend Live BAM 1993 and an NTSC all region DVD in 2006, titled Pete Townshend Live in New York featuring Psychoderelict ASIN: B000B8TJ6W. The DVD included an interview with Pete Townshend conducted by Barry Barnes recorded specifically for this release in September 2005.

=== Cast ===
The cast included:

- Pete Townshend ... Himself
- John Labanowski ... Ray High
- Linal Haft ... Rastus Knight
- Jan Ravens ... Ruth Streeting
- Sage Carter ... Athena
- John Bundrick ... Keyboards
- Peter Hope Evans ... Harmonica
- Andy Fairweather Low ... Guitar, Vocalist
- Deirdre Harrison ... Athena (voice)
- Katie Kissoon ... Vocalist
- Billy Nicholls ... Vocalist
- Pino Palladino ... Bass
- Phil Palmer ... Guitar
- Simon Phillips ... Drums
- Lee Whitlock ... Spinner (voice)

== Other media ==
In 1999, Psychoderelict was considered for production as a Broadway musical. Townshend worked on a script with director Ethan Silverman and the show was workshopped with actor Peter Gallagher. However, to date the show has not been produced.

In March 2009, the webcomic 3rd Blade began a serialized adaptation of Psychoderelict.
