= About Face (album) =

Studio album by David Gilmour
- Released: 5 March 1984
- Recorded: 1983
- Studios: Pathé Marconi (Paris); Abbey Road (London)
- Genres: Progressive rock; new wave; soft rock; hard rock
- Length: 45:19
- Labels: Harvest (UK); Columbia (US)
- Producers: Bob Ezrin; David Gilmour

David Gilmour chronology
David Gilmour (1978)	About Face (1984)	On an Island (2006)

Singles from About Face
- 1. "Blue Light" Released: 13 February 1984; 2. "Love on the Air" Released: 24 April 1984

About Face is the second solo studio album by the English singer and musician David Gilmour, released on 5 March 1984 by Harvest in the UK and Columbia in the United States, a day before Gilmour's 38th birthday. Co-produced by Bob Ezrin and Gilmour, the album was recorded in 1983 at Pathé Marconi Studio, in Boulogne-Billancourt, France. The lyrics of two tracks, "All Lovers Are Deranged" and "Love on the Air", were written by Pete Townshend of The Who. Townshend's version of "All Lovers Are Deranged" appears on his solo compilation album Scoop 3 (2001).

The album received positive reviews and peaked at number 21 on UK Albums Chart and number 32 on the US Billboard Top 200 Albums chart. Two singles were released: "Blue Light" peaked at number 62 in the United States, while "Love on the Air" failed to chart. Like Gilmour's eponymous debut solo studio album, About Face was certified gold by the RIAA. A remastered reissued CD was released in 2006 on EMI in Europe and Columbia for the rest of the world.

== Recording ==
The album was recorded with engineer Andy Jackson at a time when Pink Floyd's future was uncertain. It was mixed by James Guthrie at Mayfair Studios in London, England.

Gilmour said he wanted to take his time and make "a really good album" and "get the best musicians in the world that I could get hold of to play with me". Musicians on the album include drummer Jeff Porcaro, bassist Pino Palladino, Deep Purple keyboardist Jon Lord, backing vocalists Roy Harper and Sam Brown, orchestral arranger Michael Kamen (who had also worked on The Pros and Cons of Hitch Hiking, The Final Cut, and The Wall), and keyboardist Steve Winwood.

Another piece of music written for the album went unused by Gilmour. He asked Roy Harper, and separately Pete Townshend, to supply lyrics, but felt that those provided were not messages that he could relate to. Harper subsequently used the tune, with his lyrics, as "Hope", on his 13th studio album, Whatever Happened to Jugula? (1985). Townshend used it with his lyrics as "White City Fighting", which has a markedly faster tempo, on his fourth solo studio album White City: A Novel (1985), on which Gilmour plays.

== Music and lyrics ==
I think Pete [Townshend] feels some restrictions on what he would like to do with the Who, as I guess we all feel restrictions within everything we attempt [to do], just because of the types of personalities and role you've created for yourself. I know he's felt uncomfortable about certain things—things he could express in solo stuff. For me, the restriction was the scale of what Pink Floyd had become more than anything. It's nice to get out and do something on a slightly different scale; go out and do theatres, which is not really a possibility with Pink Floyd until we get a lot less popular.

— David Gilmour

Gilmour was later interviewed by Dallas-based disc jockey (DJ) Doug "Redbeard" Hill, on the radio programme In the Studio with Redbeard, during which the focus was his 2006 third solo studio album On an Island. He commented on About Face saying that "looking back on it, it has some great moments on there but the whole flavor of it is too '80s for my current tastes".

"Murder" was an outcry by Gilmour about the murder of John Lennon, a longtime musical peer and inspiration to him. Gilmour embellished the song with a solo fretless bassline (played by Pino Palladino), adding an edgy funk groove to the acoustic beginning of the song, leading to an instrumental bridge, where the song picks up in the speed of the beat with more electric instruments. Gilmour collaborated with Townshend on the songs "Love on the Air" and "All Lovers Are Deranged", as Gilmour recalled: "I sent him three songs and he sent back three sets of lyrics. Two of them suited me well. One didn't. He did the two on About Face and he did the other one ['White City Fighting'] on his White City album." The lyrics for "Love on the Air" were written in a day, after Gilmour had asked for Townshend's help. "You Know I'm Right" was written in a similar vein to Lennon's "How Do You Sleep?" and was a dig towards Waters. "Cruise" was about Ronald Reagan having cruise missiles stationed in Britain at the time.

== Release ==
The album featured the single "Love on the Air", with lyrics by Townshend, and the disco-style single "Blue Light", later remixed by François Kevorkian; "Blue Light" was released, backed with "Cruise", on 13 February 1984, while "Love on the Air", backed with "Let's Get Metaphysical" on 24 April. The album was released on 5 March in the UK, and on 6 March in the United States (coincidentally on Gilmour's 38th birthday). "All Lovers Are Deranged" and "Murder" were released as singles for North American rock radio; the former reaching #10 on Billboard's Mainstream Rock chart.

== Critical reception ==
Professional ratings
Review scores
Source	Rating
AllMusic	4.5/5 stars
Rolling Stone	3/5 stars
Sputnikmusic	3.5/5

Writing for AllMusic, critic Tom Demalon wrote of the album: "The songs on About Face' show a pop sensibility that Pink Floyd rarely was concerned with achieving", adding that "About Face is a well-honed rock album that is riveting from beginning to end."

== Track listing ==
All lyrics are written by David Gilmour, except where noted; all music is composed by David Gilmour.

Side one
No.	Title	Lyrics	Length
1.	"Until We Sleep"		5:15
2.	"Murder"		5:00
3.	"Love on the Air"	Pete Townshend	4:19
4.	"Blue Light"		4:35
5.	"Out of the Blue"		3:35

Side two
No.	Title	Lyrics	Length
6.	"All Lovers Are Deranged"	Townshend	3:14
7.	"You Know I'm Right"		5:06
8.	"Cruise"		4:40
9.	"Let's Get Metaphysical"	Instrumental	4:09
10.	"Near the End"		5:36
Total length:			45:19

== Personnel ==
Main personnel

- David Gilmour – lead vocals, guitar, bass, production
- Jeff Porcaro – drums, percussion
- Pino Palladino – bass
- Ian Kewley – Hammond organ, piano

Additional personnel

- Steve Winwood – Hammond organ on "Blue Light", piano on "Love on the Air"
- Anne Dudley – synthesisers
- Jon Lord – synthesisers
- Bob Ezrin – keyboards, orchestral arrangement, production
- Steve Rance – Fairlight CMI programming
- Kick Horns – brass
- Luís Jardim – percussion
- Ray Cooper – percussion
- Roy Harper – backing vocals
- Sam Brown – backing vocals
- Vicki Brown – backing vocals
- Mickey Feat – backing vocals
- The National Philharmonic Orchestra
- Michael Kamen – orchestral arrangement

Technical personnel

- Andy Jackson – engineer
- Kit Woolven – engineer
- James Guthrie – mix engineer; remastering
- Eric Tomlinson – orchestration recorder
- Doug Sax – mastering engineer
- Mike Reese – mastering engineer
- Storm Thorgerson (credited as STd (Storm Thorgerson Design)) – cover design

== Charts ==
Chart (1984)	Position
Canada Top Albums/CDs (RPM)	16
Germany Media Control Charts	24
Norway VG-lista	10
Sweden Sverigetopplistan	13
Switzerland Swiss Hitparade	15
US Billboard Top 200 Albums	32
