= O' Parvardigar (EP) =

EP by Pete Townshend
- Released: 2001 (United Kingdom)
- Genre: Rock
- Label: Eel Pie

Pete Townshend chronology
Jai Baba (2001)	O' Parvardigar (2001)	The Oceanic Concerts (2001)

O' Parvardigar is a 2001 EP by the English musician Pete Townshend devoted to his song O' Parvardigar which in turn is based on Meher Baba's Parvardigar Prayer. The EP, which was released on Townshend's own label Eel Pie, contains three versions of the song—a 1972 studio version, a live version recorded in India, and a German-language version recorded for the opening of a European Baba Centre.

== Background ==
In the early 1970s Townshend, a follower of Meher Baba since 1967, composed O' Parvardigar to the words (with a few alterations) of Meher's Parvardigar Prayer. It first appeared in 1972 on both his debut solo album Who Came First and on I Am, a tribute album to Meher with music composed and performed by Townshend and a group of other Meher followers. Townshend said in a Rolling Stone interview "I don't actually say this prayer, I just happened to put it to music [...] Preposterous as it may sound, I thought that by putting it to music, a lot people would just be saying it without thinking about it." Townshend's biographer Geoffrey Giuliano described the song as a "spiritual bullet right between the eyes, a masterpiece of poetics, devotion and the musical art." The song was later included as the final track on Townshend's 2001 album The Oceanic Concerts. A German-language version of O' Parvardigar using a translation by an Austrian follower of Meher was recorded for the opening of a European Baba Centre but was never officially released.

The song was used as the soundtrack to a short montage film on Meher's life produced by Townshend and likewise entitled O' Parvardigar. It was first screened in 1976 at the opening of the Meher Baba Oceanic Centre in Twickenham and was screened again there in 1994 on the 100th anniversary of Meher's birth. O' Parvardigar also appears on the soundtrack of Delia, another film produced by Townshend and screened at the 1976 Oceanic Centre opening. That film was a documentary on the actress Delia de Leon (1901–1993) who was an early and fervent follower of Meher and an admirer of Townshend's song.
