= Scoop (album) =

Compilation album by Pete Townshend
- Released: April 1983
- Recorded: 1965–1982
- Genre: Rock
- Length: 74:48
- Label: Atco (US)
- Producer: Helen Wilkins (as "Spike")

Pete Townshend chronology
All the Best Cowboys Have Chinese Eyes (1982)	Scoop (1983)	White City: A Novel (1985)

Professional ratings
Review scores
Source	Rating
AllMusic	4.5/5 stars
Rolling Stone	4/5 stars

Scoop is a compilation album by the English musician Pete Townshend containing 25 demos of various released and unreleased songs by the Who, as well as demos of entirely new material. The album has liner notes written by Townshend.

== History ==
The album was the first in a series of three Scoop collections: Another Scoop was released in 1987 and Scoop 3 in 2001. All three albums were 2-disc sets, and in 2002 a pared-down compilation of them all was released as Scooped. Remastered versions of the original albums were released in 2006, and again in 2017.

== Track listing ==
All tracks are written by Pete Townshend, except "Piano: Tipperary" by Jack Judge and Harry Williams.

Side one
No.	Title	Length
1.	"So Sad About Us/Brrr"	4:41
2.	"Squeeze Box"	2:27
3.	"Zelda"	2:23
4.	"Politician"	3:35
5.	"Dirty Water"	2:06
6.	"Circles"	2:09
7.	"Piano: 'Tipperary'"	1:00

Side two
No.	Title	Length
1.	"Unused Piano: 'Quadrophenia'"	2:32
2.	"Melancholia"	3:14
3.	"Bargain"	4:12
4.	"Things Have Changed"	2:23
5.	"Popular"	2:26
6.	"Behind Blue Eyes"	3:25

Side three
No.	Title	Length
1.	"Magic Bus"	4:20
2.	"Cache, Cache"	3:42
3.	"Cookin'"	3:18
4.	"You're So Clever"	4:14
5.	"Body Language"	1:29
6.	"Initial Machine Experiments"	1:51

Side four
No.	Title	Length
1.	"Mary"	3:19
2.	"Recorders"	1:17
3.	"Goin' Fishin'"	2:53
4.	"To Barney Kessel"	1:58
5.	"You Came Back"	4:03
6.	"Love, Reign O'er Me"	4:56

== See also ==
- Another Scoop
- Scoop 3
- Scooped
