= Alan Rogan =

English guitar tech and player (1951–2019)

Alan Rogan (15 February 1951 – 3 July 2019) was an English guitar tech and player. He worked primarily for Pete Townshend of the Who, starting with the 1976 Townshend and Ronnie Lane sessions for Rough Mix and continuing to 2019, taking care of Townshend and other musicians under the Who umbrella, including Roger Daltrey, Pino Palladino, and Simon Townshend.

== Biography ==
Rogan's clients also included Eric Clapton, George Harrison, Joe Walsh, Eagles, Keith Richards, Ronnie Wood, AC/DC, Cliff Richard and the Shadows and Tom Petty. As a performer, he recorded with Aretha Franklin (along with Richards and Wood), Prelude and his own band, Blues Club.

Rogan was a noted expert and collector of guitars and amplifiers, his own instruments and knowledge being used in many books. He advised Gibson, Rickenbacker and Fender on Artist Editions, innovations, historical accuracy and Artist Endorsements.

Rogan was a part of many iconic music performances, including Hail! Hail! Rock 'n' Roll with Keith Richards & Chuck Berry, The Kids Are Alright and Jumpin' Jack Flash with Aretha Franklin. Rogan also contributed to concerts and videos for Eagles, AC/DC, Tom Petty and George Harrison.
