= Another Scoop =

Compilation album by Pete Townshend
- Released: 8 July 1987
- Recorded: 1964–84
- Genre: Rock
- Length: 85:47
- Label: Atco (US)
- Producer: Pete Townshend (Kit Lambert: executive producer on September 1978 demos)

Pete Townshend chronology
Deep End Live! (1986)	Another Scoop (1987)	The Iron Man: The Musical by Pete Townshend (1989)

Professional ratings
Review scores
Source	Rating
AllMusic	4.5/5 stars
Rolling Stone	favourable

Another Scoop is a compilation album by the English musician Pete Townshend, and essentially a sequel to Scoop (1983).

== History ==
Like Scoop released in 1983, Another Scoop features a multitude of demos, outtakes and unreleased material, many of which are songs by The Who. It was followed by Scoop 3 in 2001, the third and last Scoop collection. All three albums were 2-disc sets, and in 2002 a pared-down compilation of them all was released as Scooped. Remastered versions of the original albums were released in 2006, and again in 2017.

Pete added liner notes to the release - "This is the second in a series of albums bringing together demo-tapes, home recordings and unreleased oddities produced during my career in and out of The Who.

I want to thank my friend Spike for her tireless energy raking through hundreds of hours of music to put together another interesting selection (she isn't even a Who fan!), and all the Who fans who've waited patiently while I garnered the courage to put it out. I also want to thank my friends at Atlantic records for making the space for me to release this record for collectors while I spend my time writing song for my next "serious" solo album."

PETE TOWNSHEND

July, 1986

The album is dedicated to the memory of Cliff Townshend.

== Track listing ==
All songs written and composed by Pete Townshend, except where noted.

Disc one
No.	Title	Writer(s)	Year of recording	Length
1.	"You Better You Bet"		1980	5:19
2.	"Girl in a Suitcase"		1975	3:26
3.	"Brooklyn Kids"		1978	4:49
4.	"Pinball Wizard"		1969	3:00
5.	"Football Fugue"		1978	3:25
6.	"Happy Jack"		1966	2:15
7.	"Substitute"		1966	3:35
8.	"Long Live Rock"		1972	3:47
9.	"Call Me Lightning"		1964	2:12
10.	"Holly Like Ivy"		1982	2:54
11.	"Begin the Beguine"	Cole Porter	1969	4:10
12.	"Vicious Interlude"			0:22
13.	"La-La-La-Lies"		1965	1:58
14.	"Cat Snatch"		1982-1983	3:22

Disc two
No.	Title	Year of recording	Length
1.	"Prelude #556"	1982	1:19
2.	"Baroque Ippanese"	1982	2:25
3.	"Praying the Game"	1978	4:17
4.	"Driftin' Blues"	1981	3:17
5.	"Christmas"	1968	1:57
6.	"Pictures of Lily"	1967	2:50
7.	"Don't Let Go the Coat"	1980	4:00
8.	"The Kids Are Alright"	1965	2:58
9.	"Prelude: The Right to Write"	1983	1:36
10.	"Never Ask Me"	1977	4:24
11.	"Ask Yourself"	1982-1983	4:30
12.	"The Ferryman"	1978	5:46
13.	"The Shout"	1984	3:52

== See also ==
- Scoop
- Scoop 3
- Scooped
