= Slit Skirts =

Song by Pete Townshend

from the album All the Best Cowboys Have Chinese Eyes
- Released: 14 June 1982
- Genre: Rock
- Length: 4:51
- Label: ATCO
- Songwriter: Pete Townshend
- Producer: Chris Thomas

"Slit Skirts" is a song by English musician Pete Townshend. It appears as the final track on his fourth studio album All the Best Cowboys Have Chinese Eyes (1982). The song was written by Townshend and produced by Chris Thomas. Despite never being released as a single, the song has become a fan favorite, received moderate radio play, and was included on multiple compilation albums.

== Background ==
The lyrics of "Slit Skirts" contain themes of nostalgia, romance, and aging. Jim Beviglia of American Songwriter describes the track as being about "an aging rock and roller going through romantic problems, all while trying to decide whether he should be reaching back to younger days or getting a foothold on the present." Writing for Rolling Stone Angie Martoccio highlights the track's "glittery piano" and "steamy lines about romance, aging, and unfulfillment".

Townshend himself explained in the liner notes to The Best of Pete Townshend (1996) that "Slit Skirts" was written about "getting to that place in middle age where you really feel that life is never going to be the same – you're never going to fall in love again, it's never going to be quite like it was…".

== Reception ==
"Slit Skirts" has received positive reviews from critics and is considered a fan favorite. While it was never released as a single, "Slit Skirts" reached number 41 on the Billboard Top Rock Tracks chart.

Despite being a Townshend solo track, Ultimate Classic Rock included the song in their list of the 10 best Who songs of the 1980s, stating it "convincingly argues the case for middle-aged rock" and citing it as an evolution in Townshend's songwriting "away from the past's bloody-fingered riffing and the throwback rock operas to follow." Bevigilia called the song "ready-made for radio play" due to its "singalong chorus" and "rocking arrangement".

"Slit Skirts" has been included on the compilation albums The Best of Pete Townshend (1996) and Anthology (2005).

== Chart performance ==
Chart (1982)	Peak position
US Mainstream Rock (Billboard)	41
