= Live: Sadler's Wells =

Live album by Pete Townshend
- Released: 18 September 2000 (UK)
- Genre: Rock
- Label: Eel Pie

Pete Townshend chronology
| Live: The Empire (2000) | Live: Sadler's Wells (2000) | Live: The Fillmore (2000) |

Pete Townshend Live: Sadler's Wells 2000 is a live album released by Pete Townshend in 2000. Townshend presented the music from Lifehouse at two concerts at Sadler's Wells Theatre in London on February 25 and 26, 2000, supported by a number of musicians and vocalists and The London Chamber Orchestra. Musicians included Townshend, Chucho Merchán, Phil Palmer, John "Rabbit" Bundrick, Peter Hope-Evans and Jody Linscott. Vocalists included Chyna, Cleveland Watkiss and Billy Nicholls. Violinist and orchestra leader Gaby Lester performed the violin solo on "Baba O'Riley". The live recording was also released as a video/DVD titled Pete Townshend – Music from Lifehouse in 2002.

== Track listing ==
All songs written and composed by Pete Townshend except where noted.

Disc one
| No. | Title | Length |
|---|---|---|
| 1. | "One Note" | 2:08 |
| 2. | "Purcell (Quick Movement) (Henry Purcell)" | 1:09 |
| 3. | "Teenage Wasteland" | 7:16 |
| 4. | "Time is Passing" | 3:16 |
| 5. | "Love Ain't for Keeping" | 3:01 |
| 6. | "Goin' Mobile" | 5:01 |
| 7. | "Greyhound Girl" | 3:22 |
| 8. | "Tragedy" | 5:16 |
| 9. | "Mary" | 6:14 |
| 10. | "I Don't Even Know Myself" | 5:33 |
| 11. | "Bargain" | 4:48 |
| 12. | "Getting in Tune" | 4:33 |
| 13. | "Pure and Easy" | 6:05 |
| 14. | "Baba O'Riley - Orchestral" | 10:19 |

Disc two
| No. | Title | Length |
|---|---|---|
| 1. | "Baba O'Riley" | 5:27 |
| 2. | "Hinterland Rag" | 3:39 |
| 3. | "Behind Blue Eyes" | 3:58 |
| 4. | "Let's See Action" | 6:31 |
| 5. | "Sister Disco" | 7:04 |
| 6. | "Relay" | 4:42 |
| 7. | "Who Are You" | 6:34 |
| 8. | "Join Together" | 5:20 |
| 9. | "Won't Get Fooled Again" | 11:35 |
| 10. | "Tragedy Explained" | 8:26 |
| 11. | "The Song Is Over" | 5:53 |
| 12. | "Can You Help the One You Really Love?" | 7:57 |
