= The Boathouse, Twickenham =

Coordinates: 51.46249°N 0.31891°W

The Boathouse
- Interactive map of the The Boathouse area

General information
- Type: Business
- Architectural style: 1960s
- Location: Twickenham, London, England
- Owner: Boathouse Twickenham Limited

Technical details
- Structural system: Cavity wall
- Floor count: 2

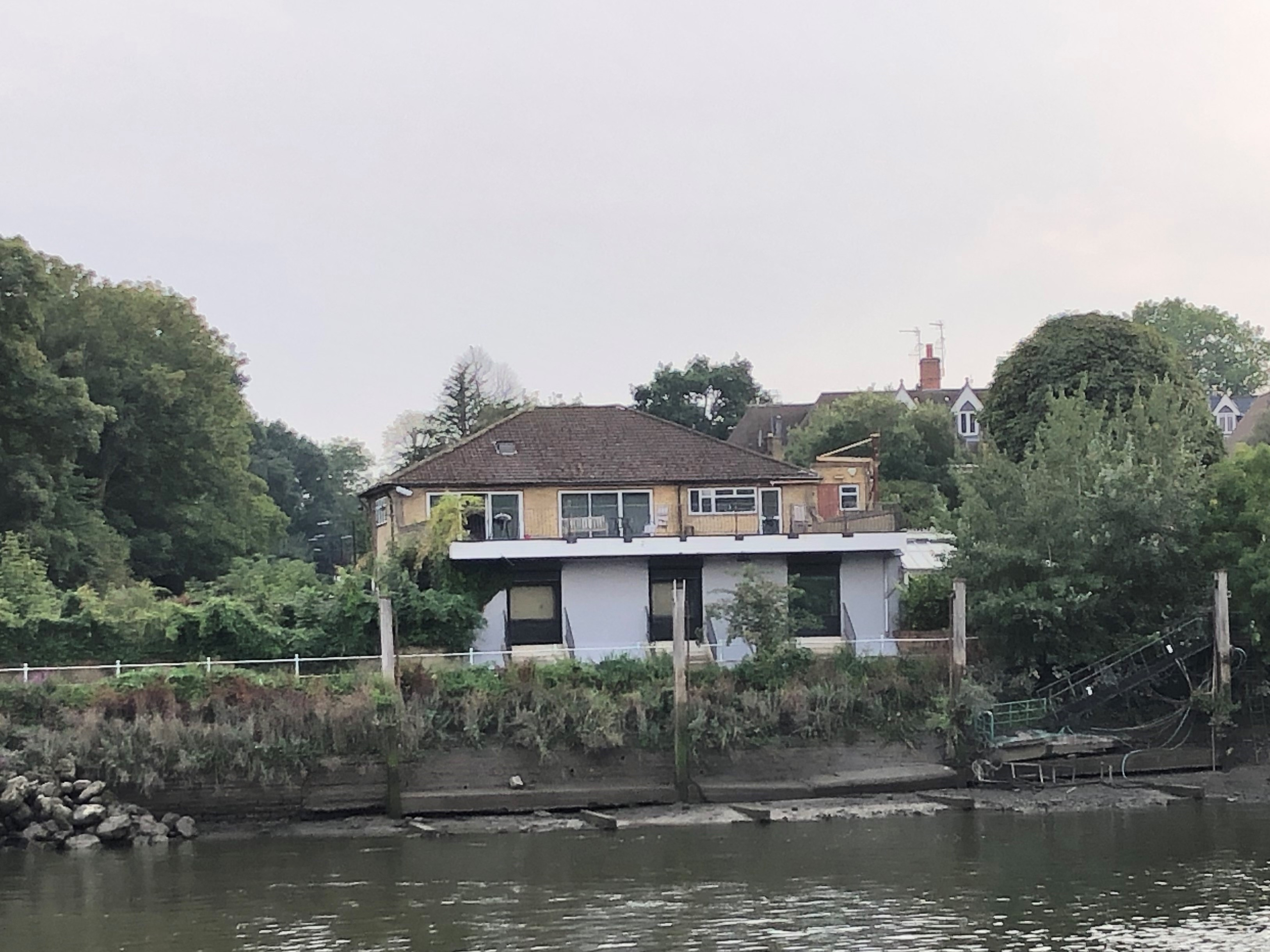
View of The Boathouse, Twickenham and disused mooring from Old Deer Park, Richmond

The Boathouse is a commercial property located at Ranelagh Drive, Twickenham in England, which housed music and film studios.

== Description ==
The Boathouse is on the south-west bank of the River Thames and is within the St. Margaret's Estate Conservation Area in the London Borough of Richmond upon Thames. It adjoins the Thames Path and features views of the Richmond Lock and the Old Deer Park.

The structure is two-storey with about 7500 square feet of interior space, and the site includes about 12,900 square feet (0.3 acres) of land. The studios and control rooms are sound-proofed and air-conditioned with raised wood-strip flooring that provides concealed cable runs. The building is of cavity wall construction with brick veneer and has a hipped roof of interlocking concrete tiles. Parts of the upper storey are covered with faux timber panels. The property includes a paved terrace on the first floor level, a glazed conservatory on the north side, a double garage and additional parking and a garden with paved walkways. The side of the property adjoining the public road and walkway is walled. A Dutch barge which is outfitted as a floating studio called Grand Cru was previously moored at the property, connected by a gangway.

== History ==
The property was previously known as Dick Waite's Boathouse, and was built in the late 1960s as part of a redevelopment of Sims' Boatyard, a builder of racing boats. It provided meeting rooms, commercial film and recording studios, offices and residential quarters for use of the boatyard. The building was dilapidated in 1976 when Pete Townshend of the Who bought it from Bill Sims and remodelled it to house his Eel Pie Studios. Townshend and Delia de Leon, a disciple of Meher Baba, started the Meher Baba Film Archive at the studios in the 1970s under the name Meher Baba Oceanic Centre. The film archive moved from The Boathouse to Norwich, Norfolk, in 1990.

Eel Pie Studios was already in business at 45 Broadwick Street when Townshend bought the new building. Although operation of the company took place at both locations, the studios in The Boathouse later became known as Oceanic Studios. The studios were occupied by the band Cocteau Twins in the 1990s, who called it September Sound, and also the band Lightning Seeds. Townshend sold the property in 2008 to Hi2 Limited, but retained ownership of the Dutch barge, Grand Cru.

Grand Cru Studio operated as a commercial studio run by Townshend's studio engineer Myles Clarke and is moored in St Katharine Docks, London.

== Current status ==
Following various attempts at marketing and selling the property, in 2009 Hi2 Limited unsuccessfully applied for planning permission. In 2017, a newly formed company, Boathouse Twickenham Limited, was unsuccessful with its planning application. The property had been transferred to Vennture (One) Limited prior to the making of the application, which was commented on by the planning inspector. Following refusal, the property was sold to Peter Gbedemah a director and the controlling, major shareholder of Boathouse Twickenham Limited. Vennture (One) Limited sold the property for a substantial sum. Vennture (One) Limited had a "Winding Up Petition" presented against it by HMRC on 14 February 2019. Peter Gbedemah's co- director, Jonathan Emuss, was instrumental in the 2017 failed planning application. Jonathan Emuss was made bankrupt on 26 June 2018, by the Isle of Man company, Greencroft International Limited – Peter Gbedemah's offshore investment company.
