= Face Dances, Pt. 2 =

Song by Pete Townshend

Single by Pete Townshend

from the album All the Best Cowboys Have Chinese Eyes
- B-side: "Man Watching" (non-album track)
- Released: July 1982
- Recorded: 1982
- Genre: New wave
- Length: 3:24
- Label: Atco
- Songwriter: Pete Townshend
- Producer: Chris Thomas

Pete Townshend singles chronology
"Keep On Working" (1980)	"Face Dances, Pt. 2" (1982)	"Uniforms (Corps d'Esprit)" (1982)

Music video
- "Face Dances, Pt. 2" on YouTube

"Face Dances, Pt. 2" is a single written and composed by the English rock musician Pete Townshend, the guitarist for the Who. The song appears on Townshend's fourth solo studio album All the Best Cowboys Have Chinese Eyes (1982).

== Background ==
Pete Townshend said that the song, in addition to the other songs on All the Best Cowboys Have Chinese Eyes, was about his personal experiences of social alienation from both his wife and band members from the Who that he experienced during the early 1980s.

["Face Dances, Pt. 2" is] the anthem of the soul in solitary confinement. It's a feeling like [a] feeling in jail. The face that I sing about is my own. I wrote the lyrics while I was looking in a mirror!

Although it shares a title with it, "Face Dances, Pt. 2" was not released on Townshend's band the Who's ninth studio album Face Dances (1981). In the liner notes for Face Dances, it is claimed that the song was written after the release of the Who album, but authors Steve Grantley and Alan Parker claim in their book, The Who by Numbers: The Story of the Who Through Their Music, that the song was cut from the album.

== Critical reception ==
Billboard suggested that the "eccentric time shifts and circular melodic scheme" would reduce its appeal to pop radio stations. They also said that the song harkened back to Townshend's "more intricate productions of the past" and would likely be received well in the album oriented rock format. Cashbox commented that the song possessed "a gracefully shimmering pop melody with some beautiful vocal layering."

== Music video ==
A companion video for All the Best Cowboys Have Chinese Eyes was also released, featuring "Face Dances, Pt. 2" as one of the concept videos. In some parts of the video, the covers for both the album and "Face Dances, Pt. 2" single sleeves are mimicked while Townshend lip syncs to the song.

This music video has been out of print for years, even though Townshend put the videos of this song and others from the album up on his website in 2000, which were then subsequently uploaded to other video websites on the Internet.

== Charts ==
Chart (1982)	Peak position
US Billboard Bubbling Under the Hot 100	105
US Mainstream Rock (Billboard)	15
