= Who Came First =

Studio album by Pete Townshend
- Released: October 1972
- Recorded: 1969–1972
- Studio: Eel Pie (London)
- Genre: Rock
- Length: 38:04
- Label: Track/Polydor (UK); Track/Decca/MCA (US)
- Producer: Pete Townshend

Pete Townshend chronology
I Am (1972)	Who Came First (1972)	With Love (1976)

Who Came First is the debut solo studio album by the English musician Pete Townshend, released in 1972 on Track Records in the UK and Track/Decca in the US.

It includes previously released material as well as tracks that originated as demos for the Who's aborted concept album Lifehouse, which became the basis of Who's Next (1971).

The original release had a gatefold cover and included a poster with additional photos of Meher Baba from the Louis van Gasteren film Beyond Words (1967). The cover photo of Townshend standing on eggs is a reference to the eternal question "Which came first: the chicken or the egg?” (although the album title changes it to "Who Came First" as a reference to the Townshend's band the Who).

The album peaked at number 30 on the UK Albums Chart and at number 69 on the US Billboard 200.

== Background and content ==
Townshend had already participated with other artists on two previous albums in tribute to his guru Meher Baba, Happy Birthday and I Am. These albums were distributed in very small quantities between 1970 and 1972 in the UK. Soon after Decca asked Townshend for permission to release the recordings, as inferior copies were circulating in the US as bootlegs. Rather than re-issuing the original albums Townshend decided to change the track list substantially and develop the project into his first "official" solo album. Three of Townshend's demos for Lifehouse were selected, along with two songs each from the earlier tribute albums and two additional songs.

Lifehouse

The Lifehouse demos included are: "Pure and Easy," edited from its original length of 8:35; "Let's See Action"; and (with minor overdubs added) "Time Is Passing." Of these, only "Let's See Action" had seen prior release, as a single by the Who in 1971. The Who's versions of the remaining two Lifehouse songs were eventually released on Odds & Sods (1974) and its reissued version. All of Townshend's Lifehouse demos were eventually released on Lifehouse Chronicles in 2000.

Tribute albums

From the tribute album Happy Birthday came Townshend's "Content" and Ronnie Lane's "Evolution." The latter is a reworking of the track "Stone" from the Faces' debut studio album First Step in 1970; the Happy Birthday version, over six minutes long, was edited to 3:36. From the follow-up tribute album I Am, Billy Nicholls' "Forever's No Time at All" and Townshend's "Parvardigar" were selected; the latter's lyrics are adapted from Meher Baba's "Universal Prayer."

Remainder

The track list was rounded out with Townshend's composition "Sheraton Gibson" and his cover of "Heartache," a.k.a. "There's a Heartache Following Me," which had been a UK number 6 hit in 1964 by the American country singer Jim Reeves and a favorite of Meher Baba, according to Townshend's notes on the album's back cover.

The songs were recorded at Townshend's home studio, which was among the most advanced home studios in England at the time. Townshend does not appear on the Nicholls track, but does play guitar on the Lane track; he plays all other instruments on the remainder of the album.

== Release history ==
Original UK copies were on Track Records, reissued by Polydor Records after Track ceased operations in 1978. The first US issue appeared on the silver Track/Decca label. In 1973 it was reissued in the US on the MCA Records black with rainbow label, but without the gatefold cover or the poster.

The first compact disc release by Rykodisc appeared in 1992 with six bonus tracks taken from the privately distributed albums, also issued in a limited edition deluxe version with extra artwork. A remastered edition appeared in 2006 on Hip-O Records, the legacy division of the Universal Music Group, with nine bonus tracks, the first six being the ones from the Rykodisc reissue. The nine bonus songs on the Hip-O reissue comprise the remaining Townshend performances from Happy Birthday and the 1976 record, With Love, along with the track "I Always Say" recorded between 1968 and 1970.

== Critical reception ==
Professional ratings
Review scores
Source	Rating
AllMusic	4/5 stars
Christgau's Record Guide	A−

Reviewing in Christgau's Record Guide: Rock Albums of the Seventies (1981), Robert Christgau wrote:

Townshend sounds as relaxed in this rather folkish Meher Baba tribute cum 'gynormouse ego trip' as Paul McCartney in his do-it-yourself studio, and a lot less self-absorbed—other musical gurumongers sound 'Content' (title of worst song here), but Pete seems happy, too. So much so that some of this music is a little lightweight—expressing the kind of undiscriminating joy in the everyday one might expect from somebody who considers 'You always were, you always are, and you always will be' both a profound sentiment and a snappy way to finish off a concept album. But I'm encouraged that Ronnie Lane (singer-songwriter on 'Evolution') offers a drink (alcohol, get it?) to the Master and his Truth. And in the end the homely sweetness and frailty of his music prevails.

== Track listing ==
All tracks are written by Pete Townshend, except where noted.

Side one
No.	Title	Writer(s)	Length
1.	"Pure and Easy"		5:32
2.	"Evolution"	Ronnie Lane	3:44
3.	"Forever's No Time at All"	Billy Nicholls; Katie McInnerny	3:06
4.	"Nothing Is Everything (Let's See Action)"		6:25

Side two
No.	Title	Writer(s)	Length
1.	"Time Is Passing"		3:27
2.	"There's a Heartache Following Me"	Ray Baker	3:23
3.	"Sheraton Gibson"		2:37
4.	"Content"	Maud Kennedy; Townshend	2:58
5.	"Parvardigar"	Townshend, adapted from Meher Baba's "Universal Prayer"	6:46
Total length:			38:04

2006 bonus tracks
No.	Title	Writer(s)	Length
10.	"His Hands"		2:11
11.	"The Seeker"		4:34
12.	"Day of Silence"		2:53
13.	"Sleeping Dog"		2:59
14.	"The Love Man"		4:59
15.	"Lantern Cabin"		4:12
16.	"Mary Jane"		2:35
17.	"I Always Say"		5:50
18.	"Begin the Beguine"	Cole Porter	4:49

45th Anniversary Deluxe Edition (2018)

Disc one – original album

Disc two
No.	Title	Writer(s)	Length
1.	"His Hands"		2:07
2.	"The Seeker" (2017 edit)		4:36
3.	"Day of Silence"		2:57
4.	"Sleeping Dog"		2:56
5.	"Mary Jane" (stage A, alternate take)		2:35
6.	"I Always Say" (2017 edit)		4:58
7.	"Begin the Beguine" (2017 mix)	Porter	4:41
8.	"Baba O'Riley" (instrumental)		9:49
9.	"The Love Man" (stage C)		4:54
10.	"Content" (stage A)	Kennedy; Townshend	2:46
11.	"Day of Silence" (alternate version)		4:38
12.	"Parvardigar" (alternate take)	Townshend, adapted from Meher Baba's "Universal Prayer"	7:12
13.	"Nothing is Everything" (earlier version)		3:57
14.	"There’s a Fortune in Those Hills"		4:09
15.	"Meher Baba in Italy" (instrumental)		2:20
16.	"Drowned" (live in India)		2:02
17.	"Evolution (Stone)" (live at Ronnie Lane Memorial, Royal Albert Hall, London, 8 April 2004)	Lane	6:12

== Personnel ==
- Pete Townshend – vocals, guitars, keyboards, bass guitar, drums, percussion; harmonica on "Day of Silence"
- Ronnie Lane – vocals and guitar on "Evolution"
- Billy Nicholls – vocals and guitar on "Forever's No Time at All"
- Caleb Quaye – guitars, bass guitar, and percussion on "Forever's No Time at All"

== Charts ==
Chart (1972)	Peak position
Australia (Kent Music Report)	35
United Kingdom (Official Charts Company)	30
United States (Billboard 200)	69
