= I Am (Pete Townshend album) =

Compilation album by various
- Released: 1972
- Recorded: UK
- Genre: Rock; spoken word
- Label: Universal Spiritual League/Eel Pie
- Producer: Pete Townshend

Pete Townshend chronology
Happy Birthday (1970)	I Am (1972)	Who Came First (1972)

I Am is a collaborative tribute concept album to Meher Baba featuring Pete Townshend, Michael Da Costa and others, first released in 1972. The album includes the original version of "Baba O'Riley" played by Townshend alone without lyrics, which, at 9:48, is almost twice as long as the augmented version which opens Who's Next.

Other albums dedicated to Meher Baba and featuring Townshend include Happy Birthday (1970), With Love (1976), and Avatar (a compilation of the previous three albums, later released as Jai Baba).

== Track listing ==
Side one
No.	Title	Artist	Length
1.	"Forever's No Time at All" (McInnerney, Nicholls)	Billy Nicholls, Katie Mclnnerney, Caleb Quaye	3:07
2.	"How to Transcend Duality and Influence People" (Costa)	Mike Da Costa	1:21
3.	"Affirmation" (Costa)	Mike Da Costa	3:53
4.	"Baba O'Riley (Demo)" (Townshend)	Pete Townshend	9:50

Side two
No.	Title	Artist	Length
5.	"This Song is Green" (Nicholls)	Billy Nicholls	2:55
6.	"Everywhere I Look This Morning" (Mindlin)	Hank Mindlin	4:50
7.	"Dragon" (Hastilow)	David Hastilow	4:55
8.	"Parvardigar" (Meher Baba, Townshend)	Pete Townshend	6:48
