= Scooped (album) =

Compilation album by Pete Townshend
- Released: May 21, 2002
- Genre: Rock
- Label: Redline (US)

Pete Townshend chronology
Scoop 3 (2001)	Scooped (2002)	Pete Townshend Live BAM 1993 (2003)

Scooped is a two-CD compilation album including tracks from Pete Townshend's three albums Scoop (1983), Another Scoop (1987) and Scoop 3 (2001). It was released in the US on the Redline label. A booklet is included that contains Townshend's commentary on the inspiration, ideas and instrumentation behind each song.

Professional ratings
Review scores
Source	Rating
AllMusic	4.5/5 stars

== Track listing ==
=== Disc 1 ===
1. Recorders - 1:19
2. Pinball Wizard - 2:56
3. Can You See the Real Me - 4:18
4. Dirty Water - 1:03
5. Zelda - 2:25
6. Pictures of Lily - 2:51
7. Body Language - 1:29
8. Siege: Theme 017 - 2:09
9. 971104 Arpeggio Piano - 1:37
10. Brooklyn Kids - 4:48
11. Substitute - 3:33
12. Elephants - 2:53
13. Eminence Front - 6:35
14. Baroque Ippanese - 2:27
15. Magic Bus - 4:21
16. I Like It the Way It Is - 4:39
17. Unused Piano: Quadrophenia - 2:35
18. Bargain - 4:15
19. Lonely Words - 3:57

=== Disc 2 ===
1. So Sad About Us/Brrr - 4:47
2. Tough Boys - 3:13
3. You Better You Bet - 5:20
4. Mary - 3:26
5. Begin the Beguine - 4:13
6. Piano: Tipperary - 1:03
7. How Can You Do It Alone - 6:26
8. Football Fugue - 3:28
9. Behind Blue Eyes - 3:30
10. Never Ask Me - 4:27
11. Circles (Instant Party) - 2:13
12. Holly Like Ivy - 2:55
13. Variations on Dirty Jobs - 4:47
14. Cat Snatch - 2:33
15. You're So Clever - 4:20
16. Love, Reign O'er Me - 4:56

== See also ==
- Scoop
- Another Scoop
- Scoop 3
