= White City: A Novel =

Studio album by Pete Townshend
- Released: 11 November 1985
- Recorded: November 1984 – July 1985
- Studios: Eel Pie Studios, Twickenham; Eel Pie Studios, Soho; AIR, London
- Genres: Rock; pop rock
- Length: 38:27
- Label: Atco (US)
- Producer: Chris Thomas

Pete Townshend chronology
Scoop (1983)	White City: A Novel (1985)	Deep End Live! (1986)

Singles from White City: A Novel
- 1. "Face the Face" Released: 1985; 2. "Give Blood" Released: 1985; 3. "Secondhand Love" Released: 1986

Professional ratings
Review scores
Source	Rating
AllMusic	3.5/5 stars
Rolling Stone	(positive)

White City: A Novel is the fifth solo studio album by the English rock musician Pete Townshend, released on 11 November 1985 by Atco Records. The album was produced by Chris Thomas (who had also produced Townshend's previous two albums, Empty Glass and All the Best Cowboys Have Chinese Eyes) and it was recorded by Bill Price at three separate recording studios in London, England: both of the Eel Pie studios, and AIR.

The album peaked at No. 70 on the UK Albums Chart, and at No. 26 on the US Billboard 200. The album also reached the Top 20 in five other countries, Australia, Germany, New Zealand, Sweden and Switzerland.

== Concept ==
A loose concept album, its title refers to a story (called a "novel" in the album title) that accompanies the album, which takes place in a low-income housing estate in the West London district of White City, near where Townshend had grown up. The story tells of cultural conflict, racial tension and youthful hopes and dreams in the 1960s – a world of "prostituted children", "roads leading to darkness, leading home" and despairing residents living in "cells" with views of "dustbins and a Ford Cortina". The song "White City Fighting", which features Pink Floyd's David Gilmour on guitar, tells listeners that the White City was "a black, violent place" where "battles were won, and battles were blown, at the height of the White City fighting".

Biographer Mark Wilkerson quotes Townshend's explanation for the “a novel” subtitle: “‘Well, I thought, if I could get away with Rock Opera . . .’ Pete told Dan Neer, ‘[that’s] a bit of a gag, you know, to address the fact that I’d been working as a book publisher lately and that if I was gonna make a record and a video, that I should call it a novel.’”

The album opens with crashing guitar chords (also played by Gilmour) that capture a feeling of urban chaos, leading into "Give Blood", a song with Townshend's moral lyrics demanding listeners to "give blood, but you may find that blood is not enough".

== Film ==
The disc also mentions a film based on the album, directed and "adapted for longform video" by Richard Lowenstein. The 60-minute video, entitled White City: The Music Movie, was released by Vestron Music Video in 1985 and stars Pete Townshend, Andrew Wilde and Frances Barber. The videotape also features exclusive footage of Townshend discussing the album and film, and the premiere performance of "Night School". That song, in a different form, would be included on Hip-O's 2006 reissue as a bonus track.

== Album contents ==
The track "White City Fighting" originated as a composition written by David Gilmour for his 1984 solo album About Face. He asked Townshend to supply lyrics, but felt that he could not relate to them, so Townshend used the song instead with Gilmour playing guitar. Gilmour sent the same tune to Roy Harper, whose lyrics had the same effect as Townshend's on Gilmour. Harper used the result, "Hope", which has a markedly slower tempo, on his 1985 album Whatever Happened to Jugula? with Harper's son Nick on guitar.

== Reception ==
Cash Box said that "Secondhand Love" "continues Townshend’s penchant for brilliant songwriting and tough, hard-hitting performance." Billboard said it's "delivered with [Townshend's] customary intensity."

Spin said, "There's really only one thing | can be sure about: White City is one of the most pretentiously boring records I've heard in quite some time. You begin to wonder why Townshend's still making records if he can't even find the inspiration to sound like himself."

== Track listing ==
All tracks are written by Pete Townshend, except where noted.

Side one
No.	Title	Length
1.	"Give Blood"	5:44
2.	"Brilliant Blues"	3:06
3.	"Face the Face"	5:51
4.	"Hiding Out"	3:00
5.	"Secondhand Love"	4:12

Side two
No.	Title	Writer(s)	Length
6.	"Crashing by Design"		3:14
7.	"I Am Secure"		4:00
8.	"White City Fighting"	David Gilmour; Townshend	4:40
9.	"Come to Mama"		4:40
Total length:			38:27

2006 Hip-O bonus tracks
No.	Title	Writer(s)	Length
10.	"Night School"		3:23
11.	"Save It for Later"	Roger Charlery; Andy Cox; Everett Morton; David Steele; Dave Wakeling	4:58
12.	"Hiding Out (12" mix)" (Previously released on 12" single)		5:50

2006 Imperial bonus tracks
No.	Title	Length
10.	"Secondhand Love" (Live in Brixton)
11.	"Face the Face" (Live in Brixton)

== Non-album tracks ==
1. "Face the Face" (Vocal long version) – 6:08 (Available on 12" US Atco and European Singles)
2. "Hiding Out" (Instrumental version) – 3:00 (Available on 12" Atco Germany single of "Hiding Out")
3. "Night School" – 3:03 (Video version)
4. "Face the Face" (Single edit) – 4:23 (Available on 7" US single)
5. "Face the Face" (Edit version) – 3:59 (Available on 12" US promo single)

== Personnel ==
Credits are adapted from the White City: A Novel liner notes.

Musicians

- Pete Townshend – vocals; guitar
- John "Rabbit" Bundrick – keyboards
- Tony Butler, Phil Chen, Chucho Merchan, Pino Palladino & Steve Barnacle – bass guitars
- Mark Brzezicki, Simon Phillips – drums
- Clem Burke – drums (tracks 2, 5)
- David Gilmour – guitar (tracks 1, 8)
- Peter Hope-Evans – harmonica
- Kick Horns: Simon Clarke, Roddy Lorimer, Tim Sanders, Peter Thoms
- Ewan Stewart – voice (spoken word)
- Emma Townshend, Jackie Challenor, Mae McKenna, & Lorenza Johnson – backing vocals
- Justine Frischmann – backing vocals on "Night School"

Technical

- Chris Thomas – producer
- Bill Price – recording
- Chris Ludwinski, Dave Edwards, & Jules Bowen – assistant engineers

Artwork

- Richard Evans – art direction; cover design; inner sleeve photography
- Alex Henderson – front cover photography
- Malcolm Heywood – inner sleeve photography

== Charts ==
Chart (1985–1986)	Peak position
Australian Albums (Kent Music Report)	16
Austrian Albums (Ö3 Austria)	26
Canada Top Albums/CDs (RPM)	10
Dutch Albums (Album Top 100)	31
German Albums (Offizielle Top 100)	15
New Zealand Albums (RMNZ)	20
Swedish Albums (Sverigetopplistan)	17
Swiss Albums (Schweizer Hitparade)	11
UK Albums (Official Charts)	70
US Billboard 200	26

== Certifications ==
Region	Certification	Certified units/sales
Germany (BVMI)	Gold	250,000^{^}
United States (RIAA)	Gold	500,000^{^}
^{^} Shipments figures based on certification alone.
