= Give Blood (song) =

Single by Pete Townshend

from the album White City: A Novel
- Released: 1985
- Recorded: 1985
- Studio: Eel Pie Studios (Twickenham); Eel Pie Studios (Soho); AIR Studios (London)
- Genre: Rock; pop rock
- Length: 5:44
- Label: Atco
- Songwriter: Pete Townshend
- Producer: Chris Thomas

Pete Townshend singles chronology
"Face the Face" (1985)	"Give Blood" (1985)	"Barefootin'" (1986)

Official audio
- "Give Blood" on YouTube

"Give Blood" is a song by the English rock musician Pete Townshend, the guitarist for the Who. The song is the opening track for Townshend's fourth solo studio album, a concept album titled White City: A Novel, and was released as a single. "Give Blood" features Pink Floyd guitarist David Gilmour. He also appears on another song from the album, "White City Fighting", the music for which was written by Gilmour.

The song was used to encourage blood donation on 14 June 2021 on World Blood Donor Day.

== Background ==
When Townshend was asked about the song he said:

Give Blood was one of the tracks I didn't even play on. I brought in Simon Phillips, Pino Palladino and David Gilmour simply because I wanted to see my three favourite musicians of the time playing on something and, in fact, I didn't have a song for them to work on, and sat down very, very quickly and rifled threw [sic] a box of stuff, said to Dave, "Do one of those kind of ricky-ticky-ricky-ticky things, and I'll shout 'Give Blood!' in the microphone every five minutes and let's see what happens." And that's what happened. Then I constructed the song around what they did.

Phillips recalled that Townshend had accidentally asked him to arrive at the recording studio one week earlier than intended. Chris Thomas, who served as the producer for these sessions, only learned of this mistake when he noticed that Phillips' drum kit was being assembled in the studio. While Gilmour was present, the recording session lacked a bassist as Townshend had booked Palladino for the week after. As such, Townshend searched his house for a suitable demo and returned with "Give Blood".

The basic track consisted of an electric guitar with echo, which created a "steam-train effect" according to Phillips. For the purpose of augmenting the electric guitar track, Phillips created a drum part built around sixteenth note rhythms and a prominent backbeat. During take 2, Thomas requested that Phillips only play the kick and the snare drum, although they disagreed on how this should be approached. Phillips ultimately decided to compromise by exclusively focusing on the kick drum, snare drum, and tom-toms during the instrumental interlude. During this section, Phillips also recreated a drum fill from Herbie Hancock's 1983 song "Rockit" due to his belief that "Give Blood's" tempo would properly accommodate it. His drumming on "Give Blood" was later highlighted in Modern Drummer's "Best Recorded Performance Chart" feature in 1986.

== Release and critical reception ==
"Give Blood" was among the most added songs to album oriented rock radio stations according to Radio & Records during the week of 15 November 1985. It later peaked at No. 5 on Billboard's Mainstream Rock Chart in January 1986 and spent a total of 15 weeks on the listing. The single failed to chart in UK and did not reach the Billboard Hot 100.

Cashbox characterised "Give Blood" as a "strong paean to world peace. They labelled it as his "most promising single in recent memory" and believed that it would have crossover appeal on both rock stations and contemporary hit radio. Billboard called it a "strongly conflicted power-rock track" that "resolves paranoia with hope, brutal imagery with idealism." Rolling Stone said that the song rebuked modern depictions of heroism. Stephen Thomas Erlewine of AllMusic ranked "Give Blood" as one of Townshend's best compositions, calling it "anthemic".

== Charts ==
Chart (1986)	Peak position
Australia (Kent Music Report)	77
Germany (GfK)	61
US Mainstream Rock (Billboard)	5
