= All the Best Cowboys Have Chinese Eyes =

Studio album by Pete Townshend
- Released: 14 June 1982
- Recorded: 1981–1982
- Studios: Wessex Sound (London); Eel Pie (London); AIR (London)
- Genres: Rock; new wave; art rock
- Length: 41:14
- Label: Atco (United States)
- Producer: Chris Thomas

Pete Townshend chronology
Empty Glass (1980)	All the Best Cowboys Have Chinese Eyes (1982)	Scoop (1983)

Singles from All the Best Cowboys Have Chinese Eyes
- 1. "Face Dances, Pt. 2" Released: 28 May 1982; 2. "Uniforms (Corp d'Esprit)" Released: 23 July 1982

All the Best Cowboys Have Chinese Eyes is the fourth solo studio album by the English rock musician Pete Townshend, released on 14 June 1982 by Atco Records. Chris Thomas produced the album (who had also produced Townshend's previous studio album, Empty Glass) and it was recorded by Bill Price at three separate recording studios in London, England, which were Eel Pie, AIR and Wessex. The album peaked at No. 32 on the UK Albums Chart, and at No. 26 on the US Billboard 200.

All the Best Cowboys Have Chinese Eyes contains some compositions that were salvaged from later studio albums by his band the Who, and was released just under three months before their tenth studio album It's Hard (1982).

== Recording and production ==
Along with the 11 songs on the album, other songs were also recorded, including "Body Language" (subsequently released in 1983 on the compilation album Scoop), a track called "Man Watching" (released as the B-side of "Face Dances, Pt. 2"), and "Dance It Away" (which was also performed in various forms live by the Who between 1979 and 1981, usually as a coda to their cover version of Martha and the Vandellas's 1964 song "Dancing in the Street"), and which was released as the B-side of "Uniforms". One further song "Vivienne" was listed on the cover of some early LP copies but not released at the time. This, along with "Man Watching" and "Dance It Away", were released as bonus tracks on the 2006 reissue.

=== Album title ===
Townshend explained the album title in an interview with Kurt Loder for Rolling Stone:

"Basically, [the title All the Best Cowboys Have Chinese Eyes] is about the fact that you can't hide what you're really like. I just had this image of the average American hero - somebody like a Clint Eastwood or a John Wayne. Somebody with eyes like slits, who was basically capable of anything - you know, any kind of murderous act or whatever to get what was required - to get, let's say, his people to safety. And yet, to those people he's saving, he's a great hero, a knight in shining armor - forget the fact that he cut off fifty people's heads to get them home safely. Then I thought about the Russians and the Chinese and the Arab communities and the South Americans; you've got these different ethnic groups, and each has this central image of every other political or national faction as being, in some way, the evil ones."

On the Listening Time promotional LP, Townshend said the album should have won a "Stupid Title of the Year" award.

== Video release ==
A 30-minute companion video was also released, featuring concept videos set to the musical backings of "Prelude", "Face Dances, Pt. 2", "Communication", "Uniforms (Corp d'Esprit)", "Stardom in Acton", "Exquisitely Bored", and a re-recorded version of "Slit Skirts", with a harmonica performance on the last song, not used on the studio cut.

Chalkie Davis, the director (with Carol Starr) of the video, said:

It was 1 pm on a Tuesday in 1982 when the phone rang, 'Hi Chalkie, it's Pete (Townshend), there is this thing starting in America, it's called MTV and they want a 30-minute film of me, if you can get to Bill Curbishley's office by 2:30 pm with a script I reckon I can get you the job.' We got the job, we started filming the following Monday and shot for six days, we had two full days and four afternoons with Pete.

This has been out of print for years, though Pete Townshend put the videos up on his website in 2000, which were then subsequently uploaded to other sites on the Internet.

== Critical reception ==
Professional ratings
Review scores
Source	Rating
AllMusic	4.5/5 stars
The Encyclopedia of Popular Music	2/5 stars
Rolling Stone	4/5 stars
Sounds	1.5/5 stars
The Village Voice	D+

All the Best Cowboys Have Chinese Eyes was panned by most music critics upon its release. In a contemporary review for the Village Voice, Robert Christgau found it "pretentious at an unprecedented level of difficulty" and said that Townshend twisted "such long words into such unlikely rhymes and images and marshal arrangements of such intricate meaninglessness." Stereo Review called it an "ambitious failure" and felt that Townshend tends to indulge in his ideas on rock music and life on his songs. In a positive review for Rolling Stone, Jon Pareles called the album "a mess of contradictions", but an exceptional listen because of Townshend's arrangements, which "surge and subside as gracefully as anything in rock; they're neither static nor jolting."

In a retrospective review for AllMusic, Stephen Thomas Erlewine called it the type of album that "taunts cynics and critics, being nearly impenetrable in its content even if the production and the music itself aren't all that inaccessible." Stylus Magazine's Justin Cober-Lake said that the album "might at times be convoluted or over-thought," but "remains affecting and compelling" because of Townshend's sincere lyrics.

Rob Hughes of Classic Rock included "The Sea Refuses No River" in a list of the top 10 most underrated Townshend songs.

== Track listing ==
All tracks are written by Pete Townshend, except where noted.

Side one
No.	Title	Writer(s)	Length
1.	"Stop Hurting People"		3:55
2.	"The Sea Refuses No River"	Townshend; Alan Rogan	5:53
3.	"Prelude"	Townshend; Andy Newman	1:31
4.	"Face Dances, Pt. 2"		3:24
5.	"Exquisitely Bored"		3:41
6.	"Communication"		3:19

Side two
No.	Title	Writer(s)	Length
7.	"Stardom in Acton"		3:42
8.	"Uniforms (Corp d'Esprit)"		3:42
9.	"North Country Girl"	traditional; arranged by Townshend	2:27
10.	"Somebody Saved Me"		4:51
11.	"Slit Skirts"		4:54
Total length:			41:14

Bonus tracks (2006 reissue)
No.	Title	Length
12.	"Vivienne"	3:37
13.	"Man Watching"	2:32
14.	"Dance It Away"	3:38

== Personnel ==
Credits are adapted from the All the Best Cowboys Have Chinese Eyes liner notes.

Musicians

- Pete Townshend – vocals; guitars; keyboards (Prophet 5–10 Synthesizer, ARP 2500 and Synclavier)
- Virginia Astley – piano
- Tony Butler – bass guitar
- Peter Hope-Evans – harmonica
- Mark Brzezicki – drums
- Simon Phillips – drums
- Jody Linscott – percussion
- Chris Stainton – additional keyboards
- Poli Palmer – tuned percussion
- John Lewis – Fairlight CMI programming
- Ann Odell – brass arrangement on "The Sea Refuses No River"

Technical

- Chris Thomas – producer
- Bill Price – engineer
- Mark Freegard – assistant engineer
- Tim Young – mastering engineer
- Alan Rogan – Guitar Technician

Artwork

- Carol Starr – photography
- Chalkie Davis – photography
- Richard Evans – typography, calligraphy and graphics
- Michael Spry – photographic prints
- Ike King – hair
- Jacqui Lefton – makeup
- Kenny McDonald – tailor

== Charts ==
Chart (1982)	Peak position
Australian Albums (Kent Music Report)	41
Canada Top Albums/CDs (RPM)	10
New Zealand Albums (RMNZ)	17
Norwegian Albums (VG-lista)	33
UK Albums (Official Charts)	32
US Billboard 200	26
