= Face the Face =

Single by Pete Townshend

from the album White City: A Novel
- B-side: "Hiding Out"
- Released: 1985
- Recorded: 1985
- Studio: Eel Pie Studios (Twickenham); Eel Pie Studios (Soho); AIR Studios (London)
- Genre: Rock; pop rock
- Length: 5:51 (album version); 4:23 (single edit)
- Label: Atco
- Songwriter: Pete Townshend
- Producer: Chris Thomas

Pete Townshend singles chronology
"Uniforms (Corps d'Esprit)" (1982)	"Face the Face" (1985)	"Give Blood" (1986)

Music video
- "Face the Face" on YouTube

"Face the Face" is a song by the English rock musician Pete Townshend. The song is the third track on Townshend's fifth solo studio album, a concept album titled White City: A Novel, and was released as a single. The UK and US single edit features Pete Townshend's daughter Emma Townshend singing some parts on the song.

The single reached No. 26 on the US Billboard Hot 100 (Townshend's most recent American top 40 hit as a solo artist) and No. 3 on Billboard's Mainstream Rock chart, along with achieving top 20 status in Australia, New Zealand and several European territories, but did not share the same success in the UK, only peaking at No. 89 on the UK singles chart.

== Background ==
When Pete Townshend was asked about the song he said:

Face the Face was done on a new keyboard, which was a form of [Yamaha] DX7, and I was very keen to get something very, very fast and upbeat knocked out, and I knocked out a few sections that I couldn't play all together. I could play bits of it, but try and do it all together and it confounded me, so I did a bunch of building blocks and said to Rabbit, "I want forty of them" — this is a Mozart technique — "five of those, six of these, seven of those," and he wrote it all out and played it to a drum loop that we got from a box, and that became the beginning of the track. This was very much a new age type of recording, and that's why it sounds pretty modern, I think. Simon Phillips overdubbed the drums, we later overdubbed the brass, we overdubbed backing vocals, we overdubbed everything. It was all overdubbed onto Rabbit's synthesizer playing.

== Release ==
In the US, the single had a different take which had inferior sound compared to the UK release and the packaging for the US promo single said:

Dear Programmer: Enclosed is a reservice of the Pete Townshend single "Face the Face." While Pete was visiting us here in the States, he remarked to us that the British single sounded a bit hotter. We checked... he was right. Same edit. Same mix. Hotter sound. Maybe you wouldn't notice. Maybe you would. Time to re-cart the record. Happy Holidays, Atco Records.

== Critical reception ==
Cashbox called it a "playful upbeat track...with strong emphasis on a high energy marching drum groove and playful vocal mix." Billboard called it a "a high-powered explosion at a feverish tempo." Spin said, "when you hear lyrics such as [these] performed in 'fashionable' rap style, well, you're reminded why the Who's strongest point was never their James Brown covers." Reviewing the song for Music Week, Jerry Smith said that "Face to Face" was "a bright, lively single" that "shows a welcome return to a wilder vein than Townsend's most recent work".

== Music video ==
Geoffrey Giuliano in his book, Behind Blues Eyes: The Life of Pete Townshend (2002), described "[T]he highlight of the video is the poolside staging of the electric 'Face the Face', in which director Richard Lowenstein effectively captures the excitement of a big-band performance and Townshend's joyous jitterbugging ... in a gold lamé, forties-style tuxedo Lowenstein reveals more story line in these five minutes than the entire video". It was released with Townshend's concept album, White City: A Novel, and included his discussing the music.

== Chart performance ==
=== Weekly charts ===
Chart (1985–86)	Peak position
Australia (Kent Music Report)	9
Belgium (Ultratop 50)	14
Canada Top Singles (RPM)	17
Europe (European Hot 100 Singles)	40
Germany (GfK)	15
Netherlands (Dutch Top 40)	9
Netherlands (Single Top 100)	14
New Zealand (Recorded Music NZ)	11
Sweden (Sverigetopplistan)	8
Switzerland (Swiss Hitparade)	14
UK Singles (Official Charts)	89
US Billboard Hot 100	26
US Mainstream Rock Airplay (Billboard)	3

=== Year-end charts ===
Chart (1986)	Position
Australia (Kent Music Report)	71
