= English Boy (song) =

Single by Pete Townshend

from the album Psychoderelict
- Released: 19 July 1993
- Genre: Rock
- Length: 5:07
- Label: Atlantic
- Songwriter: Pete Townshend
- Producer: Pete Townshend

Pete Townshend singles chronology
"I Won't Run Anymore" (1985)	"English Boy" (1993)	"Let My Love Open the Door (1996 remix)" (1996)

"English Boy" is a song by the English musician Pete Townshend, released as the first and only single from his 1993 album Psychoderelict. The song is used to introduce the character Ray High, as well as journalist Ruth Streeting, host of Street on the Street. Townshend has said the song is about "the emergence of the modern punk", and has been referred to as the focus point for the entire album. There are three versions of this song:

- the first, lengthier version features dialog by Ruth Streeting over instrumental parts of the song.
- the second was released as an edited, no dialog version, and appeared on both single releases in 1993 and on the Pete Townshend compilation albums coolwalkingsmoothtalkingstraightsmokingfirestoking, Anthology, and Gold.
- a reprise, which ends the album and features a slightly different backing (including harmonica by Peter Hope-Evans and additional cowbell) and dialog by Ray High, wrapping up the album and imploring "what happened to all that lovely hippie shit?"

== Single release ==
"English Boy" was released as a single in the UK. Reviewing the single for Music Week, Alan Jones, wrote that it worked "almost as well outside the concept album Psychoderelict as within it", adding that it was a "pace-changing juggernaut of a song, with an attacking vocal, rock instrumentation and literate lyrics." The single was released in a 7" vinyl format, which consisted of the non-dialog and dialog versions of "Enligsh Boy". Two CD variants were also released, with the first variant including the dialog version "English Boy", "Fake It", and Psycho Montage". CD single 2 included the non-dialog version of "English Boy", with "Fake It", "Early Morning Dream", and a demo of "Flame" as B-sides.

== Chart performance ==
Chart (1993)	Peak position
US Mainstream Rock (Billboard)	19
