= Eel Pie Studios =

UK recording studio owned by Pete Townshend

Coordinates: 51.4623°N 0.3192°W

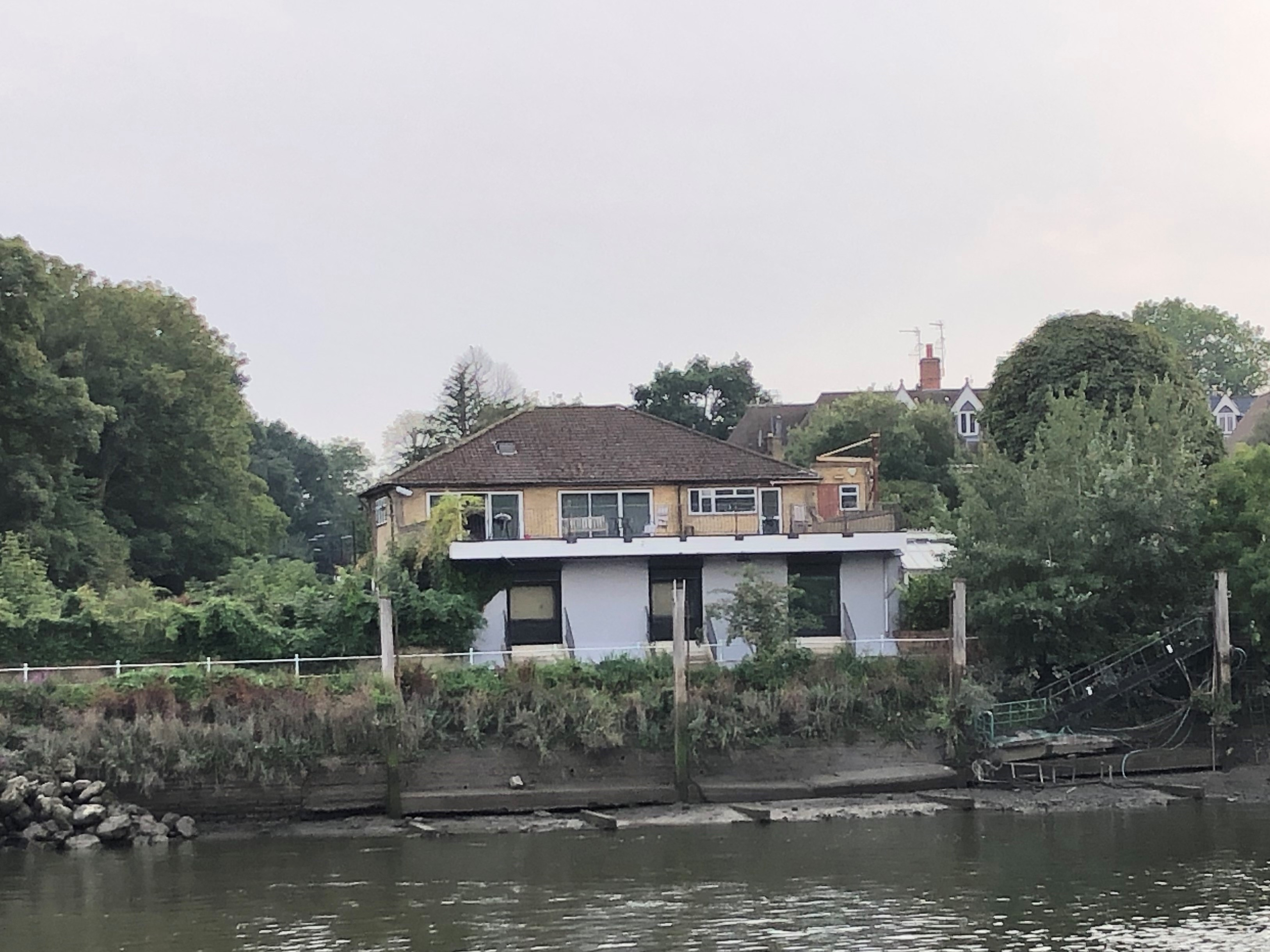
View of the former Eel Pie Studios building beside the River Thames near Richmond in 2020

Eel Pie Recording Studios, formerly Oceanic, is a former recording studio located in The Boathouse, Twickenham on the banks of the River Thames in Ranelagh Drive, by Twickenham Bridge, West London, and also simultaneously at No. 45 Broadwick Street, Soho, London. The name for the studios came from the nearby Eel Pie Island, which was known as a major jazz and blues venue in the 1960s.

The building in Twickenham was originally a 1960s boathouse, and its riverside location allowed Pete Townshend to commute there by boat, having lost his driving licence. From 1981 the studios were run as a commercial operation and were the location for a number of notable rock and pop recordings. Artists who recorded at Eel Pie Studios include Pete Townshend, the Who, Roger Waters, a-ha, Rachel Fuller, The Damned, Siouxsie and the Banshees and Thin Lizzy. In the 1990s, the studio was occupied by the band Cocteau Twins, who called it September Sound, and the Lightning Seeds.

Pete Townshend sold the studios in 2008 and the building was converted into a private residence.

'Eel Pie' had earlier been used as the name for a series of Pete Townshend's home studios, where he recorded many song demos. His debut studio album, Who Came First (1972), was recorded at home, as were some recordings by the Who circa 1970.
