= All Shall Be Well =

All Shall Be Well may refer to:

- "All shall be well, and all shall be well, and all manner of thing shall be well", a quote from the writing of Julian of Norwich

== Literature ==
- All Shall Be Well; And All Shall Be Well; And All Manner of Things Shall Be Well, a 2008 novel by Tod Wodicka
- All Shall Be Well, a book by Matthew Bunson (born 1966)
- All Shall Be Well: Explorations in Christian Universalism from Origen to Moltmann, a 2010 book edited by Gregory MacDonald
- All Shall Be Well: On Compassion and Love, a 1986 book by Michael Elmore-Meegan
- All Shall Be Well: The Spirituality of Julian of Norwich for Today, a 1982 book by Robert Llewelyn
- All Shall Be Well, a 1994 novel by Deborah Crombie
- All is well, and all is well, and all shall be well, Mr. Wednesday to Shadow in Neil Gaiman's American Gods

== Music and films ==
Music

- All Shall Be Well (album), by Virginia Astley, 1992
- All Shall Be Well, a 2002 album by Bukas Palad Music Ministry
- "All Shall Be Well", a 2009 Advent carol by Roxanna Panufnik
- "All Shall Be Well" a 1979 choral work by Libby Larsen
- "All Shall Be Well", a 1989 song from The Iron Man: The Musical by Pete Townshend
- "All Shall Be Well", a song by Ruby Turner from the 1998b album Call Me by My Name
- "All Shall Be Well", a song by Andrew Peterson from the 2005 album The Far Country
- "All Shall Be Well", a song by The Anchoress from the 2021 album The Art of Losing (The Anchoress album)

Films

- All Shall Be Well (2024 film), a Hong Kong film by Ray Yeung

== See also ==
- Four Quartets, a set of poems by T. S. Eliot, whose "Little Gidding" quotes Julian's words
