= Robert Llewellyn (disambiguation) =

Robert Llewellyn (born 1956) is a British actor, comedian and writer.

Robert Llewellyn may also refer to:

- Robert Llewelyn (priest) (1909–2008), Church of England priest
- Robert Llewellyn (photographer) (born 1945), American photographer
- Robert Baxter Llewelyn (1845–1919), colonial administrator in the British Empire
