= From Gardens Where We Feel Secure =

Studio album by Virginia Astley
- Released: 29 July 1983
- Recorded: April–June 1982
- Genre: Ambient
- Length: 37:55
- Labels: Happy Valley; Rough Trade
- Producers: Virginia Astley; Russell Webb

Virginia Astley chronology
From Gardens Where We Feel Secure (1983)	Promise Nothing (1983)

From Gardens Where We Feel Secure is the debut album by English musician Virginia Astley, released on 29 July 1983 on Astley's own label Happy Valley Records and distributed by Rough Trade Records. It was recorded in 1982 and co-produced by Astley and Russell Webb.

The album is a predominantly instrumental collection of tone poems that describe the cycle and mirror the moods of a summer day. It is notable for its structure, moving from dawn to dusk, and its use of natural sound effects, over which Astley and co-producer Webb recorded their own improvised playing. Upon release, From Gardens Where We Feel Secure reached number four on the UK Independent Albums chart. It was subsequently reissued in 2003.

== Background and recording ==
While concurrently working on a more song-oriented album, Virginia Astley conceived From Gardens Where We Feel Secure as a separate instrumental project which she intended to evoke the feeling of a summer day. Zoo Records co-founder Bill Drummond had previously suggested that Astley record an instrumental album for his label, but after Astley lost contact with Drummond, she undertook the project independently. Astley later stated that she had not originally pictured it as her debut album, and recorded it "as a side project" because she "decided it would be nice to do something about summer".

From April to June 1982, Astley and her co-producer Russell Webb made various trips to the Moulsford and South Stoke countrysides to make field recordings of assorted natural sounds. Most of these were captured during one week in late April using a rented portable Uher tape machine, with a more "ordinary" recorder being used for later visits. Working in Astley's father Edwin's eight-track home studio in Moulsford, Astley and Webb recorded music – the former on piano and flute, and the latter on acoustic and electric guitar – over their field recordings, and used tape manipulation to achieve desired effects and speeds. Astley's nieces Emma Townshend and Aminta Townshend provided additional backing vocals, while Jo Wells of Kissing the Pink played clarinet on the track "Hiding in the Ha-Ha". Afterwards, Astley booked a separate studio for several days to mix the album. Astley recalled that although mixing proved to be a costlier process than recording, the album overall "didn't cost very much in relative terms", while the self-funded nature of the project allowed her to retain ownership of the album's master recordings.

A largely instrumental work, From Gardens Where We Feel Secure has been described as an album of pastoral ambient music. Its tracks are tone poems that collectively evoke the progression of a summer day from dawn to dusk, with the album being divided into two sections, "Morning" and "Afternoon". The music on the album was entirely improvised, with Astley explaining that "the only thing I had planned beforehand was to create an atmosphere – just create this really heavy-with-summer atmosphere", and that she wanted "to have something that's played at a quiet level that's not in-your-face and you're not listening to the lyrics ... that's always what this album was meant to be – played quietly." From Gardens Where We Feel Secure, its title track, and the track "Out on the Lawn I Lie in Bed" were named after lines from the W. H. Auden poem "A Summer Night", while "When the Fields Were Burning" was inspired by Astley's mother's recollection of a dream in which firemen extinguished a blaze caused by stubble burning.

== Release ==
After the album's planned release on Zoo Records fell through, Astley shopped From Gardens Where We Feel Secure to the record label WEA, who showed interest but wanted Astley to re-record the album for release, which she felt would have been infeasible due to its improvised nature and extensive tape effects. As a result, Astley instead opted to release the album on her own label Happy Valley Records, licensing the album to Rough Trade Records for distribution. The album's front sleeve cover, a pressed flower artwork, was designed by Martyn Atkins based on a brief by Astley. Released on 29 July 1983, From Gardens Where We Feel Secure peaked at number four on the UK Independent Albums chart. Two of the album's tracks, "A Summer Long Since Past" and "It's Too Hot to Sleep", had previously been issued in January 1983 on the 12-inch edition of Astley's single "Love's a Lonely Place to Be", while "When the Fields Were on Fire" had appeared on Meridians 2, a compilation issued by the Touch label in May 1983.

In 1985, Astley released the single "Melt the Snow", which included two compositions she originally created for a potential winter-themed counterpart album to From Gardens Where We Feel Secure; a "more industrial and more city-like" companion album was also considered, but never materialised. She later re-recorded the track "A Summer Long Since Past" for her 1986 album Hope in a Darkened Heart. On 29 September 2003, a remastered CD reissue of From Gardens Where We Feel Secure was released by Happy Valley and Rough Trade. As Atkins could no longer be contacted, photographs by Astley were used to create new artwork for the reissue.

== Critical reception ==
Professional ratings
Review scores
Source	Rating
AllMusic	4.5/5 stars
Number One	4/5
Pitchfork	8.4/10
Q	4/5 stars
Record Mirror	3.5/5 stars
Smash Hits	8 1/2/10
Sounds	3.5/5 stars
Uncut	4/5 stars

In a glowing review for Smash Hits, critic Peter Martin called From Gardens Where We Feel Secure "a diary of sounds" that "evokes a perfect childhood well spent in the heart of a green and pleasant land", and "recaptures the purity of innocence and is sheer bliss." Paul Bursche described it in Number One as a "dreamy and pastoral" album where "piano, flute and clarinet lovingly combine to give aural pictures of a relaxed countryside." Writing that it "has absolutely nothing to do with any pop trend past or present, simply being one person's exploration of a temporary mood and ambience", Record Mirror's Jim Reid concluded that "if this is a marginal work, well away from the Top 20 racks of your local record store it is still worthy of inspection. At times Virginia's tenuous grasp at permanence is quite beautiful." Mick Sinclair from Sounds posited that "for all its guise of rural quietness this, to me, makes some kind of inverted comment on the urban landscape", observing a "latent power" behind the music's "mask of tranquility and 'softness'".

Retrospectively, AllMusic reviewer Stewart Mason praised From Gardens Where We Feel Secure as "a lovely 35-minute meditation" and Astley as "no mere ambient noodler", adding that the album's tracks "are melodically rich and varied; mood pieces in the truest sense of the term." "Specifically designed to mirror the moods of an indolent summer day," he concluded, "From Gardens Where We Feel Secure is a dreamy, involving ... fascinating listen." Noting that its "peacefulness went much against the general grain in 1983", Uncut's Marcello Carlin deemed it a "quietly influential" record which "seemed to be as back-to-basics as Billy Bragg (albeit in a different way), but in reality was as futuristic as the Art of Noise." Writing for Pitchfork, Simon Reynolds opined that "no one else on the UK indie scene at that time made a record as beguilingly bucolic as Gardens", which he placed within "a centuries-old tradition of rhapsodic pastoralism in British culture", finding that "Astley's music taps into that zone where idyllic personal memory bleeds into collective nostalgia: mythic notions of England as Arcadia." Dave Simpson suggested that the record "foreshadowed chillout and the likes of the Orb's 'Little Fluffy Clouds' and Enya's Watermark" in a piece for The Guardian, who in 2007 named it one of "1000 albums to hear before you die". In 2018, Pitchfork listed it as the 147th-best album of the 1980s, with staff writer Matthew Schnipper calling it "an inimitable album of ambient music" whose "feeling is both ancient and eternal – many worlds away from our fast-moving, digital era."

== Track listing ==
All tracks are written by Virginia Astley.

Side one ("Morning")

1. "With My Eyes Wide Open I'm Dreaming" – 5:43
2. "A Summer Long Since Past" – 4:36
3. "From Gardens Where We Feel Secure" – 3:59
4. "Hiding in the Ha-Ha" – 3:55

Side two ("Afternoon")

1. "Out on the Lawn I Lie in Bed" – 5:09
2. "Too Bright for Peacocks" – 2:29
3. "Summer of Their Dreams" – 3:21
4. "When the Fields Were on Fire" – 3:25
5. "It's Too Hot to Sleep" – 5:18

== Personnel ==
Credits are adapted from the album's liner notes.

- Virginia Astley – production, photography
- Russell Webb – production, engineering
- Martyn Atkins – design
- David A. Jones – design

== Charts ==
Chart (1983)	Peak position
UK Independent Albums (MRIB)	4
