= Hope in a Darkened Heart =

1986 studio album by Virginia Astley

Studio album by Virginia Astley
- Released: 24 November 1986
- Recorded: August–September 1986
- Studio: The Wool Hall (Beckington, England)
- Genre: Dream pop; baroque pop
- Length: 38:41
- Label: WEA
- Producer: Jon Astley; Richard J. Burgess; Phil Chapman; Ryuichi Sakamoto

Virginia Astley chronology
Promise Nothing (1983)	Hope in a Darkened Heart (1986)	All Shall Be Well (1992)

Hope in a Darkened Heart is the second studio album by the English singer Virginia Astley, released on 24 November 1986 by WEA. It was produced primarily by Japanese musician and composer Ryuichi Sakamoto. The album is noted for featuring former Japan singer David Sylvian on the track "Some Small Hope" and for an alternate version of "A Summer Long Since Passed", which was originally included on Astley's From Gardens Where We Feel Secure album. An additional track, "Le Song (A Day, a Night)", along with lyrics and a biography, is available on the Japanese issue.

The tracks "Some Small Hope" and "Charm" were released as singles but were not commercially successful. Two further tracks, "Love's a Lonely Place to Be" and "Darkness Has Reached Its End", had been issued some years before the album's release but likewise had no impact on the singles chart.

On 25 December 2020, Caroline Polachek and Lauren Auder released a cover version of "Some Small Hope" with all benefits going to a homelessness charity in Los Angeles. Polachek described Astley's music as "one of my deep favorites... such an inspiration to me."

== Track listing ==
1. "Some Small Hope"
2. "A Father"
3. "So Like Dorian"
4. "I'm Sorry"
5. "Tree Top Club"
6. "Charm"
7. "Love's a Lonely Place to Be"
8. "A Summer Long Since Passed"
9. "Darkness Has Reached Its End"
  Japanese edition bonus track
10. "Le Song (A Day, a Night)"

== Personnel ==
Musicians

- Virginia Astley – vocals
- Masaki Sekijima – programming
- Ryuichi Sakamoto – all keyboards
- David Sylvian – vocals (track 1)
- Ted Astley – original arrangements (tracks 2, 6)

Technical

- Ryuichi Sakamoto – production, mixing (tracks 1–6); arrangement
- Tony Phillips – engineering (tracks 1–8); mixing (tracks 7–9)
- Jon Astley – production (track 7)
- Phil Chapman – production (track 7)
- Richard J. Burgess – production (track 9)
- Phill Brown – engineering (track 9)
- Virginia Astley – mixing (tracks 7–9)

Artwork

- Richard Israel – photography
