= Lauren Auder =

British-French singer-songwriter and record producer

- At Mutations Festival Brighton, UK, 23 October 2026

Background information
- Born: 1998 (age 27–28); Watford, England
- Origin: Albi, Occitanie, France
- Genre: Baroque pop
- Occupations: Singer-songwriter; record producer
- Years active: 2015–present
- Label: True Panther Sounds

Lauren Auder (born 1998) is a British-French singer-songwriter and record producer. Born in Watford and raised in the French town of Albi, she began her career producing for underground French and English rap artists. Auder signed to True Panther Sounds and made her solo debut in 2018 with the EP Who Carry's You, which was followed by the EP Two Caves In in 2020. Her debut album, The Infinite Spine, was released on 18 July 2023.

== Life and career ==
=== 2015–2016: Early years and career beginnings ===
Auder was born in Watford, near London, where she lived until the age of seven when she moved with her music journalist parents to Albi, France to avoid the "hectic and expensive lifestyle" of London. At the time of their migration, her mother worked at NME, while her father worked at Kerrang! She revealed in 2015, at the age of seventeen, that she was doing literary studies in Albi. In 2015, Auder began working with artists in the London underground hip hop scene such as Lord Pusswhip, Jeshi and Slowthai, while also self-publishing content onto SoundCloud on the side. During this period of her early career, Daisy Jones of Dazed wrote, "With [her] woozy, far-away vocals and dreamy, half-baked beats, the 17-year-old French-English producer sounds like King Krule if [she] got heavily into hip hop and pushed [her] music through a coedine-coated seive." After graduating from high school in September 2016, she returned to London shortly after signing to independent record label True Panther Sounds.

=== 2017–2020: Who Carry's You and Two Caves In ===
In December 2017, Auder made her professional solo debut under True Panther Sounds with the single "The Baptist" which was inspired by Maurice Duruflé. This was followed by her second single "These Broken Limbs Again Into One Body" in February 2018. Both singles would feature on her debut EP Who Carry’s You, which was released in March 2018. In October 2018, she accompanied Christine and the Queens on their tour of Europe supporting the album Chris (2018).

Supported by the singles "June 14th" and "Meek", Auder's second EP Two Caves In was released in March 2020. In September 2020, Auder and Boston-based producer Mmph provided American band Haim a remix version of the song "Summer Girl" by for their titular remix EP. In December 2020, Auder and American singer-songwriter Caroline Polachek released a cover version of the song "Some Small Hope" by Virginia Astley.

=== 2021–present: 5 Songs for the Dysphoric, The Infinite Spine, and Whole World As Vigil ===
Auder released her third EP, 5 Songs for the Dysphoric, in February 2021. Her first album The Infinite Spine was released on 18 July 2023. On January 28, 2026, she released "Praxis" as the lead single to her album Whole World As Vigil, which was released on 27 March 2026.

== Artistry ==
Auder is a baritone vocalist. Daisy Jones of Noisey described her musical style as orchestral pop. Steve Janes of WithGuitars.com wrote that she "adopt[s] the ethos of classic era baroque pop to fuse elements of post-rock and soul with modern classical, ambient and experimental electronics." Auder cites French composer Maurice Duruflé and California rap duo Main Attrakionz as some of her biggest musical influences, while also being inspired by romantic poets such as William Blake.

== Personal life ==
In September 2019, Auder came out as transgender. She used they pronouns up until August 2020 when she began publicly identifying as a woman. She told i-D: "In a lot of ways I’ve known forever, and in other ways I’ve known since I was 12, and in other ways I’m only just figuring it out, but I’m way more in touch with myself and how I feel and who I want to be [...] I think it’s made me more confident and aware of myself. That transition in my life, and becoming an adult, has gone hand in hand with the way I present my work.”

As of October 2020, Auder resides in Bermondsey in England.

== Discography ==
Albums

- The Infinite Spine (2023)
- Whole World As Vigil (2026)

Extended plays

- Who Carry's You (2018)
- Two Caves In (2020)
- 5 Songs for the Dysphoric (2021)
