= Escape from Zahrain =

1962 American action film directed by Ronald Neame

- Theatrical release poster
- Directed by: Ronald Neame
- Screenplay by: Robin Estridge
- Based on: Appointment in Zahrain by Michael Barrett
- Produced by: Ronald Neame
- Starring: Yul Brynner; Sal Mineo; Jack Warden; Madlyn Rhue
- Cinematography: Ellsworth Fredericks
- Edited by: Eda Warren
- Music by: Lyn Murray
- Color process: Technicolor
- Production company: Paramount Pictures
- Distributed by: Paramount Pictures
- Release date: May 23, 1962
- Running time: 93 minutes
- Country: United States
- Language: English
- Box office: $1.4 million (US/Canada)

Escape from Zahrain is a 1962 American Panavision adventure film directed by Ronald Neame and starring Yul Brynner. The film is based on the novel Appointment in Zahrain by Michael Barrett (1960) and is produced and distributed by Paramount Pictures.

== Plot ==
The film is set in the fictional state of Zahrain, located in the Arabian Peninsula. An officer in the security service of a despotic regime arranges to murder a jailed revolutionary leader while he is being transferred between prisons. The leader's supporters stage a rescue, intending to subsequently flee across the desert to the Protectorate of Aden.

In the chaos of the rescue two condemned prisoners, a common criminal with no interest in politics and an American oil worker, join the leader and the mastermind of the breakout in getting away. Later they encounter an educated nurse who they are compelled to take along, and a jaded British intelligence agent who they are confident will not reveal their whereabouts. Together they provide different perspectives on the Middle East of the early 1960s.

== Cast ==
- Yul Brynner as Sharif
- Sal Mineo as Ahmed
- Jack Warden as Huston
- Madlyn Rhue as Laila
- Anthony Caruso as Tahar
- Leonard Strong as Ambulance Driver
- Jay Novello as Hassan

== Production ==
The film was based on the novel Appointment in Zahrain which was published in 1960. Paramount bought the novel prior to publication and gave the job to adapting the script to Dudley Nichols.

In October 1960 Paramount's then-chairman Jack Karp announced Richard Matheson was doing a script and Edward Dmytryk was going to direct the film.

By May 1961 Yul Brynner was attached as star, with Ronald Neame to produce and direct and Sal Mineo to co star. Robin Estridge wrote the script.

Filming began June 1961.
