= The Pirates of Blood River =

1962 British film by John Gilling

- UK quad poster
- Directed by: John Gilling
- Screenplay by: John Hunter; John Gilling
- Story by: Jimmy Sangster
- Produced by: Michael Carreras
- Starring: Kerwin Mathews; Christopher Lee; Glenn Corbett; Peter Arne; Marla Landi; Andrew Keir; Oliver Reed
- Cinematography: Arthur Grant
- Edited by: Eric Boyd-Perkins
- Music by: Gary Hughes
- Production company: Hammer Film Productions
- Distributed by: Columbia Pictures
- Release dates: 13 July 1962 (London Pavilion); 2 August 1962 (UK)
- Running time: 84 minutes (U.K.); 87 minutes (U.S.)
- Country: United Kingdom
- Language: English

The Pirates of Blood River is a 1962 British swashbuckler film directed by John Gilling and starring Kerwin Mathews, Glenn Corbett, Christopher Lee and Oliver Reed.

Escaping from a penal colony, the story's hero, Jonathan Standing, is captured by pirates led by Captain LaRoche who force him to lead them back to his home village to retrieve a treasure supposedly hidden there.

== Plot ==
'The Isle of Devon' is a settlement founded by Protestant refugees in the seventeenth century, on a remote island. Jonathan Standing is the son of the community's leader, Jason, and the great-grandson of its founder, Simeon. Jason finds him with a married woman and charges them with adultery. Jonathan is seized; the woman tries to swim away but is killed by piranhas.

In a hall that serves as a church and lawcourt, under a huge statue of Simeon, Jason sentences Jonathan to 15 years' hard labour. At the penal colony, an overseer singles Jonathan out for particularly harsh treatment, but he manages to escape.

Pirates discover Jonathan and take him to their captain, Laroche. Laroche, who has heard stories of the settlers' treasure, says he needs an island where his men can stay. He promises he will help restore justice to the settlement if Jonathan guides him there.

The pirates reach a farm on the settlement's outskirts, owned by the Blackthornes. Blackthorne tries to defend his wife and daughter but is knifed. Standing realises Laroche has lied to him: the pirates tie him up.

Word of the pirates reaches the settlement. Jason orders all children taken to the hall and all men to take up firing positions on the settlement's walls. Laroche tells Jonathan the islanders must surrender, as otherwise they can expect no mercy. Beneath the parapet, Jonathan tries to persuade his father, but an islander fires at him, and the pirates attack.

Pirates manage to scale the walls, enter the hall and start dragging out children and women as hostages. The islanders cease firing; Laroche enters the settlement unopposed. Jason tells Laroche there is no treasure. Laroche disbelieves him. He announces that for each day the islanders remain silent about it, two of them will hang.

That night, while the pirates carouse drunkenly inside the hall, Jonathan's friend Henry unties him. He tells him the treasure does exist: his own father told him, just before he died, that the original settlers brought gold with them, but only Jason knows where it's hidden.

Henry and other islanders grab arms and horses, and ride away. Jonathan stays and bars the settlement's entrance behind them. Hearing the noise, Laroche rushes outside. He reminds Jonathan what will happen if he is not told where the treasure is. Jonathan pleads with his father, but Jason is obstinate; he points to the statue and asks Jonathan what Simeon would do. Jonathan, saddened, turns away to see that Laroche is watching them.

Laroche gathers everyone in the hall, saying he has 'made a discovery'. He orders his men to remove the statue. Breaking up the boards underneath, they start digging but eventually strike rock without finding anything. Laroche orders the ship's mate, Hench, to massacre everyone, but Jonathan realises the statue itself is golden and shows that it has been painted. Laroche has the pirates move it out on a wagon, bringing the two Standings as hostages.

The pirates and their captives move the wagon laboriously towards a river. Henry's renegades ambush them: Jonathan escapes, but Jason will not abandon the statue. Their numbers depleted, the pirates encounter a pit the renegades have dug; their foremost two men fall onto stakes. Aware more traps are to come, Laroche orders the statue to be carried by hand, with Jason in front. As the pirates make their way through a forest, Jonathan fells a tree on them; they scatter, but one of them is crushed. Hench warns Laroche that the men will not go on. Laroche says contemptuously they cannot go back: once they reach the river, they will build a raft and transport the statue to their ship.

At the river, a mutiny breaks out. Hench disarms Laroche, saying they'll leave without him. Islanders creep up on the pirates as they tie the statue to their raft. A gunfight ensues. The remaining pirates try to escape on the raft but Jason swims up and attacks them single-handedly. Hench fights with Henry, who gets wounded but kills him; Jonathan fights Laroche, and runs him through. Piranhas swarm towards the raft and kill all the survivors, including Jason. Jonathan helps Henry away, as the statue sinks.

== Cast ==
- Kerwin Mathews as Jonathan Standing
- Glenn Corbett as Henry
- Christopher Lee as Captain LaRoche
- Peter Arne as Hench, a pirate
- Marla Landi as Bess Standing
- Desmond Llewelyn as Tom Blackthorne
- Oliver Reed as Brocaire, a pirate
- Andrew Keir as Jason Standing
- Michael Ripper as Mack, a pirate
- David Lodge as Smith
- Dennis Waterman as Timothy Blackthorne
- Jack Stewart as Godfrey Mason
- Marie Devereux as Maggie
- Lorraine Clewes as Martha Blackthorne
- Jerold Wells as Penal Colony master
- Diane Aubrey as Maggie (uncredited)

== Production ==
=== Development ===
After becoming established as a horror studio, Hammer approached Jimmy Sangster to write a pirate film, with their only stipulation that the film had to take place on land for budget reasons. The resulting film was the first of a series of pirate-themed pictures by Hammer, the others being Captain Clegg and The Devil-Ship Pirates.

=== Filming ===
Filming took place from 3 July to 31 August 1961 at Bray Studios and Black Park. Christopher Lee and Oliver Reed both recalled performing a scene which the stunt professionals refused to do, and so the actors playing pirates had to wade through a lake themselves; Lee claimed that Michael Ripper nearly drowned and that he himself was only saved by being 6'4", while Reed sustained an eye infection that left him hospitalised. Reed's own memory was that director John Gilling "thought I was really quite something, because I'd do things that stunt men wouldn't do. It was only because I was stupid". Gilling, who had a reputation for being abrasive on set, fired the stuntmen for refusing.

=== Post-Production ===
The film was originally given an X certificate by the BBFC; after Hammer agreed to make cuts, it received an A certificate, and further cuts needed to be made before it could get the "U" rating Hammer wanted. A scene where a young woman trying to swim was attacked by piranhas was among the cuts.

== Reception ==
=== Box office ===
The film premiered at the London Pavilion on 13 July 1962, then on 2 August it went on general release, on a double bill with Mysterious Island (1961); the two became Britain's biggest grossing double bill of the year. According to Films and Filming it was the tenth most popular movie in Britain for the year ended 31 October 1962.

=== Critical ===
The Guardian called it "bright and breezy, thought-free and weightless", noting that it had been released to coincide with school holidays.

Kinematograph Weekly praised it for "Thrilling story, robust characterization".

Variety said, "Satisfactory adventure... Christopher Lee lends magnetic personality to the role".

The Monthly Film Bulletin wrote: "Stodgy, two-dimensional costume piece. Blood flows freely against colourful locations, but most schoolboys are likely to wish that the pirates had stayed out at sea."

Leslie Halliwell said: "Land-locked blood and thunder for tough schoolboys".

The Radio Times Guide to Films gave the film 3/5 stars, writing: "This Hammer swashbuckler is a colourful, action-packed adventure. ... There are wenches and scurvy knaves galore, but only tantalising vestiges of the X-rated bloodbath intended, as the film was reduced to U certificate derring-do for the school holidays after long sessions at the censor's office".

== Bibliography ==
- Hearn, Marcus; Barnes, Alan (2007). The Hammer Story: The Authorised Story of Hammer Films (rev. ed.). London: Titan. ISBN 1-84576-185-5.
- Johnson, Tom; Miller, Mark A. (2004). The Christopher Lee Filmography: All Theatrical Releases, 1948-2003. Jefferson, NC: McFarland & Company. ISBN 0-7864-1277-1.
- Meikle, Denis (2009). A History of Horrors: The Rise and Fall of the House of Hammer (rev. ed.). Lanham, MD: Scarecrow. ISBN 978-0-8108-6353-8.
