= The Hornet's Nest (1955 film) =

1955 film directed by Charles Saunders

- DVD cover
- Directed by: Charles Saunders
- Written by: Allan MacKinnon
- Produced by: Guido Coen
- Starring: Paul Carpenter; June Thorburn; Marla Landi
- Cinematography: Harry Waxman
- Edited by: Margery Saunders
- Music by: Edwin Astley
- Production company: Kenilworth Film Productions
- Release date: May 1955
- Running time: 61 minutes
- Country: United Kingdom
- Language: English

The Hornet's Nest is a 1955 British second feature ('B') crime comedy film directed by Charles Saunders and starring Paul Carpenter, June Thorburn, and Marla Landi. It was written by Allan MacKinnon.

== Plot ==
Thief Posh Peterson hides his loot of £20,000 worth of jewels under the floor boards of an abandoned scow (named The Hornet's Nest) moored in London's Chelsea Embankment, but he is captured and thrown in jail after assaulting someone. Two young models, Pat and Terry, rent the vessel as a houseboat through Bob Bartlett, a friendly local salvage dealer acting as an intermediary for the rental agency.

Upon his release, Posh and his accomplices, headed by Mr Arnold, attempt to recover the loot, but it is no longer under the floor boards. After several plot twists, Bartlett eventually brings the crooks to justice. Having observed all these events from their vantage point, two neighbouring elderly sisters, Becky and Rachael Crumb, end up with the goods, which they gift to the two models to help them claim the £2,000 reward money.

== Cast ==
- Paul Carpenter as Bob Bartlett
- June Thorburn as Pat
- Marla Landi as Terry Savarese
- Alexander Gauge as Mr. Arnold
- Charles Farrell as Posh Peterson
- Larry Burns as Alfie
- Christine Silver as Becky Crumb
- Nora Nicholson as Rachael Crumb
- Christopher Steele as vicar
- Jan Holden as Miss Wentworth
- Ronnie Stevens as Bill, the photographer
- Max Brimmell as Staines
- Colin Douglas as Martin
- Wilfred Fletcher as Woolgar
- Trevor Reid as Detective Sergeant Filson
- Gaylord Cavallaro as Humphrey Holder
- Anita Bolster as Miss Anderson
- Stuart Nichol as publican (uncredited)

== Critical reception ==
The Monthly Film Bulletin wrote: "Comedy thriller of a modest and unsophisticated type, with a pleasant performance from Paul Carpenter and amusing Arsenic and Old Lace style playing by Christine Silver and Nora Nicholson as the Misses Crumb."

Kine Weekly wrote: "The picture, typically English in design and execution, seldom hurries, but, nevertheless, mixes popular romance, artless humour and wholesome rough stuff effectively and culminates on a showmanlike note."

In British Sound Films: The Studio Years 1928–1959 David Quinlan rated the film as "mediocre", writing: "Weak comedy-thriller on Arsenic and Old Lace lines."
