= Marla Landi =

Italian-born British film actress (born 1933)

Marla Landi, Lady Dashwood
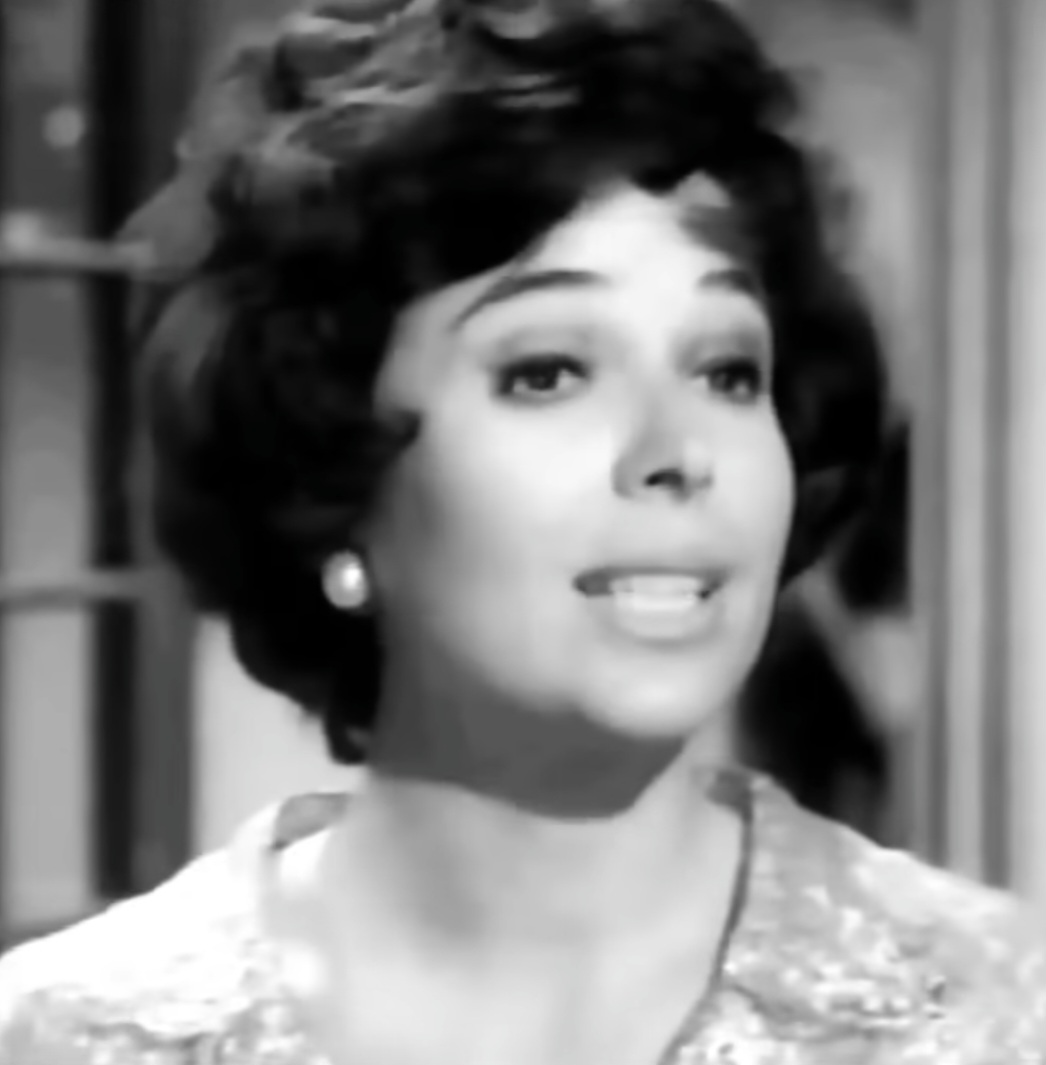
- Landi in the TV series One Step Beyond, episode The Villa
- Born: Marcella Teresa Scarafina; 1933 (age 92–93); Turin, Italy
- Occupations: Actress; TV presenter; model; businesswomen
- Spouse: Sir Francis Dashwood, 11th Baronet

Marla Landi, Lady Dashwood (born Marcella Teresa Scarafia in 1933, Turin, Italy) is an Italian-born British film actress and television presenter.

== Career ==
Landi's major roles included Across the Bridge (1957), Dublin Nightmare (1958), First Man into Space (1959), The Murder Game (1965), and the Hammer films The Hound of the Baskervilles (1959, as Cecile Stapleton) and The Pirates of Blood River (1962). She was a Play School presenter from 1964 to 1970. Joy Whitby, the programme's creator and earliest producer, recalled in 2013: "She spoke English with a heavy accent, but she was very loveable and children adored her". Landi also presented Parliamo Italiano. She appeared in an episode of the television version of Hancock's Half Hour known as "The Italian Maid" in 1959.

She was a photographic model and had a number of magazine covers including Vogue, Harper's Bazaar and Tatler. She later became the Fashion editor for Harper's Bazaar. She then went on to set up her own wig business.

== Personal life and honours ==
In 1977, she married Sir Francis Dashwood, 11th Baronet; they lived at West Wycombe House in Buckinghamshire.

She was made a Knight of the Order of Merit of the Italian Republic for promoting the Italian language and culture in the United Kingdom.

== Filmography ==
#	Year	Film	Role	Notes
1	1954	The Golden Link	Maria	
2	1955	The Hornet's Nest	Terry Savarese	
3	1957	Across the Bridge	Mary	
4	1958	Dublin Nightmare	Anna Monti	
5	1958	First Man into Space	Tia Francesca	
6	1959	The Hound of the Baskervilles	Cecile Stapleton	
7	1962	The Pirates of Blood River	Bess Standing	
8	1965	The Murder Game	Marie Aldrich	
