= Eye of the Devil =

1966 British film by J. Lee Thompson

- Theatrical release poster
- Directed by: J. Lee Thompson
- Screenplay by: Robin Estridge; Dennis Murphy
- Based on: Day of the Arrow by Philip Loraine
- Produced by: John Calley; Martin Ransohoff
- Starring: Deborah Kerr; David Niven; Donald Pleasence; Sharon Tate; David Hemmings
- Cinematography: Erwin Hillier
- Edited by: Ernest Walter
- Music by: Gary McFarland
- Production company: Filmways Pictures
- Distributed by: Metro-Goldwyn-Mayer
- Release dates: 18 November 1966 (Milan); 6 September 1967 (Wisconsin); 7 March 1968 (United Kingdom)
- Running time: 96 minutes
- Countries: United Kingdom; United States
- Language: English
- Budget: $3 million

Eye of the Devil (Note: The film is sometimes known by its working title 13 ior Thirteen.) is a 1966 mystery horror film directed by J. Lee Thompson and starring Deborah Kerr, David Niven, Donald Pleasence and Sharon Tate. Adapted from the 1964 novel Day of the Arrow by Philip Loraine, the movie is set in rural France. It was shot at the Château de Hautefort and in England. The film's plot concerns a family inheritance of an estate shrouded by a mysterious and highly ritualistic veil of secrets, and the investigation that follows in trying to uncover the meaning of these ominous peculiarities.

The film was not a commercial success upon release but is considered by some to have obtained a cult status of sorts.

== Plot ==
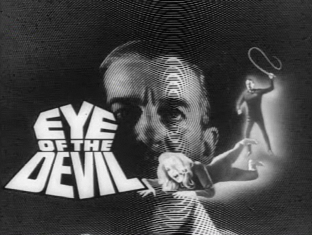
Title card from the film's trailer

Philippe de Montfaucon, Marquis de Bellenac, (Note: Although the Turner Classic Movies website gives the name of the estate as "Bellac", this is an error. It appears on the Festival banner and is pronounced by many characters. The New York Times's review of the original book gives the name of the estate as Bellac. This may be the source of this error.) the hereditary owner of an ancient estate in Bordeaux, lives in Paris with his devoted wife Catherine and two young children, Jacques and Antoinette. He is abruptly summoned to Bellenac, where a sinister priest gives him a strange amulet. After Jacques dreams that his father needs him, the Marquise take their children to the chateau. When they arrive, archer Christian de Caray shoots a dove, which then falls at Catherine's feet. Upon questioning, Philippe's aunt Estelle observes that Christian and his sister Odile are "very wicked". Estelle later dismisses Catherine.

Late at night, Catherine discovers Odile and Christian ceremoniously carrying the impaled dove into a candlelit room where robed figures sit. They present the dove first to an altar whose cross resembles the amulet and then to the figure sitting at the head. The doors close in Catherine's face, and an old man warns her to take her children and never return.

Philippe is quick to dismiss Catherine's concerns—the valley is steeped in superstition. He speaks of his family's 1000-year history in Bellenac and the responsibility he has. His aunt tells him she would "rather die" than "say anything" to Catherine, and begs him to flee. Meanwhile, Odile enchants Jacques by changing a toad into a dove. Catherine questions the unusual fixation of Christian and Odile on her son, and grows increasingly disturbed by their increasing presence.

A family friend, Jean-Claude, helps Catherine discover the Montfaucon history: twenty-two of the heads of the family have died in "mysterious circumstances", going back to the 1200s. Meanwhile, Philippe visits the blighted vineyards and returns to learn that Catherine has ridden out to the tomb of Edouard de Montfaucon. There she finds a carving matching a painting in the chateau and an inscription referring to twelve dancers. Emerging from the mausoleum, she is pursued by robed figures, faints, and awakens in her bed. Philippe gives her a sedative and kisses her.

Emerging from and fleeing through a series of nightmares, Catherine finds herself locked inside the bedroom chamber; she is eventually able to break open the window shutter and signal to Estel, who sends her maid. Catherine wakes, and all is normal. The doctor tells her she was given belladonna, a hallucinogen. The community is celebrating "Les Treize Jours" (The Thirteen Days). People fill the church, where Père Dominic prays in Latin. Philippe kneels alone; Estelle and the children sit in the front pew. Philippe pauses when he sees Catherine, but the priest proceeds. Outside, twelve robed figures form a circle in front of Philippe and sway. Philippe kisses Jacques; the crowd gasps. Philippe welcomes all to the Festival, paraphrasing Genesis 1:11. Estelle screams.

In her room, for Jacques's sake, Estelle reveals to Catherine that her brother Alain, Philippe's father, did not die, but ran away, to escape. He now lives in the tower above. Upstairs, she recognizes Alain, who warned her. He explains that the thirteen days / dancers are the twelve apostles dancing around Christ, or in the case of the heretical town of Bellenac, a living god suitable for blood sacrifice. Père Dominic, a pagan, celebrates a Black Mass. When Philippe kissed Jacques, it showed that Philippe was doomed.

Elsewhere, Jacques watches the priest praying over his father. The priest brings Catherine to Philippe. Detached, he tells her it can't be stopped, that Philippe is dying for what he believes in, and that no one will believe her testimony of what she has uncovered. As Philippe rides away with the ritually-robed figures and Christian, Catherine manages to escape and pursue the group, though she is unable to save her husband; Christian strikes down Philippe in the thick of the forest. Philippe's body is then ceremonially brought back into the heart of Bellenac; Jacques watches.

In torrential rain, Jean-Claude is seen reading a newspaper account of the "accident". As the family prepares to drive away, Jacques stops and insists that he retrieve his watch; inside, the priest is waiting for him, holding the amulet for Jacques, who kisses it and then returns to the car. The car is shown driving away from the chateau, while Odile sits outside in a windstorm, smiling.

== Cast ==
- Deborah Kerr as Catherine de Montfaucon, Marquise de Bellenac
- David Niven as Philippe de Montfaucon, Marquis de Bellenac
- Donald Pleasence as Père Dominic
- Edward Mulhare as Jean-Claude Ibert
- Flora Robson as Countess Estelle, Alain's sister
- Emlyn Williams as Alain de Montfaucon, Philippe's father
- Sharon Tate as Odile de Caray
- David Hemmings as Christian de Caray
- John Le Mesurier as Dr. Monnet
- Michael Miller as Grandec
- Donald Bisset as Rennard
- Pauline Letts as Marianne
- Robert Duncan as Jacques de Montfaucon
- Suky Appleby as Antoinette de Montfaucon
- Marianne Stone as Père Dominic's Servant (uncredited)

== Production ==
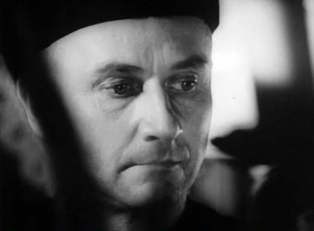
Donald Pleasence in the trailer for the film

=== Development ===
In his New York Times column Criminals at Large, Anthony Boucher praised the 1964 novel Day of the Arrow, written by Robin Estridge under the pen name Philip Loraine. Boucher compared the book to the works of Daphne du Maurier, Mary Stewart, Victoria Holt, Norah Lofts and Evelyn Berckman, writing that it "tells very much the same kind of brooding, atmospheric story, in very much the same kind of setting (an ancestral castle in the Auvergne), but from a male viewpoint and with a mind working in a completely masculine manner. ... This is a setting for [a] highly civilized and aristocratic nightmare, as a young Scottish painter (Note: This character was omitted from the film.) tries to identify the sinister forces that are taking control of his friend the Marquis. The answer will come as no surprise to anyone who has ever leafed through The Golden Bough, but its obviousness in no way diminishes its power. The book is as full of tantalizing and terror‐hinting symbols as a pack of tarot cards, and as oddly vivid in its invented folklore as Ngaio Marsh's Death of a Fool."

Martin Ransohoff of Filmways, who had a multi-picture deal with Metro-Goldwyn-Mayer, bought the film rights to Day of the Arrow.

Estridge adapted his own novel for the screen. Dennis Murphy shared credit for the screenplay. Terry Southern did additional "tightening and brightening" of the script, uncredited.

=== Casting ===
Kim Novak, who had signed a three-picture deal with Ransohoff in 1961, was signed to play the lead, with Niven co-starring.

Tate, who had a recurring role on The Beverly Hillbillies, was under a seven-year contract to Ransohoff and made her feature film debut in Eye of the Devil. Said Ransohoff, "Everybody should make an effort to show a new face in every major picture".

=== Filming ===
Sidney J. Furie, who had signed a three-picture deal with Ransohoff, was originally slated to direct Eye of the Devil. In August 1965, shortly before filming was to begin, Furie was replaced by Michael Anderson. Anderson fell ill, and was replaced, in turn, by J. Lee Thompson.

The feature's title was changed from Day of the Arrow to 13 shortly before shooting started. Alex Sanders, an English occultist and Wiccan, was hired as a consultant to give the pagan rites some authenticity.

Principal photography commenced on 13 September 1965. Shooting locations included the Château de Hautefort and the surrounding area, and MGM British Studios in Borehamwood, England.

In November, two weeks before filming was scheduled to conclude, Novak was thrown from a horse while performing in a key scene, and injured her back. The production shot around Novak while she recovered, filming scenes that did not require her. Novak returned to the set after two weeks, but was exhausted after only a day's work, and forced to take more time off. When the production was told that she would need another eight weeks to recover before returning to work, it was decided to replace her with Kerr, even though this meant reshooting a significant amount of footage, since Novak appeared in nearly three-quarters of what already had been filmed.

"It is tragic, but without Kim or a replacement, we cannot go on," David Niven said. "The person I feel most sorry for is director J. Lee Thompson. He has put everything into this picture." As to Novak's injury, her husband, Richard Johnson, said, "It is not something that will trouble her for the rest of her life. She will recover eventually. It is going to take time and will not be an easy matter." Novak would later say that she had fractured a vertebra.

Filming resumed in December 1965 with Kerr. Some long shots of Novak, filmed before her injury, did make it into the movie.

In his autobiography, Hemmings disputed that Novak had been replaced because of an injury. He said that he had witnessed a bitter argument take place between Novak and Ransohoff near the end of filming, and improbably claimed (given the cost of re-shooting) that Novak was fired as a result.

When asked about working with such a distinguished cast, Tate responded, "Of course I was nervous but I was flattered rather than intimidated because everybody put me at such ease. They are such pros. You don't see their technique but when you are surrounded by the best it brings out the best in you."

== Release ==
Eye of the Devil was the last black-and-white film released by Metro-Goldwyn-Mayer. By 1967, all of the major studios had effectively moved entirely to color.

Eye of the Devil opened regionally in the United States in 1967, premiering in Wisconsin on 6 September. By 21 September 1967, the film was screening in major cities such as Los Angeles, at drive-in theaters. The film was released in New York City theaters later that year, on 7 December 1967.

In the United Kingdom, the film was released in London on 7 March 1968.

=== Home media ===
Eye of the Devil was released in the United States on DVD on 21 February 2011 by Warner Home Video, via its Warner Archive DVD-on-demand service.

On 26 October 2021, Warner Archive released the film on Blu-ray, featuring a new 4K scan of the original film elements.

== Reception ==
=== Critical response ===
Eye of the Devil was met with little critical attention and was generally ignored by mainstream critics. The film was not a commercial success, and later in the year it was listed as one of only three films released by producer Martin Ransohoff that had not made money (the other two were Don't Make Waves and The Loved One).

Sharon Tate's debut did not do much for her career. American reviews of Tate's performance were less than stellar, such as The New York Times characterizing her performance as "chillingly beautiful but expressionless". Writers outside of North America were more favorable, with retrospectives noting how she "makes a significant visual impression" but "her immaculate British accent was dubbed" and that "she certainly displays a screen presence [...] and a glittering future ahead of her".

== Legacy ==
Although it was not a commercial success in the United States when first released, Eye of the Devil went on to garner praise for its atmospheric cinematography, offbeat tone and the performances of Kerr and Tate. It has acquired a degree of cult status not only due to its surreal themes but the murder of Tate in 1969.

== Sources ==
- Capua, Michelangelo (2010). Deborah Kerr: A Biography. Jefferson, North Carolina: McFarland & Company. pp. 148–49. ISBN 978-0-7864-5882-0.
- Chibnall, Steve (2001). J. Lee Thompson. Manchester, England: Manchester University Press. ISBN 978-0-719-06012-0.
- Ellis, Bill (2000). Raising the Devil: Satanism, New Religions, and the Media. Lexington, Kentucky: University Press of Kentucky. ISBN 978-0-813-12170-3.
- Hemmings, David (2004). Blow Up... and Other Exaggerations: The Autobiography of David Hemmings. London, England: Robson. ISBN 978-1-861-05789-1.
- Hill, Lee (2001). A Grand Guy : the Art and Life of Terry Southern. New York City, New York: HarperCollins. ISBN 978-0-380-97786-4.
- King, Greg (2000). Sharon Tate and the Manson Murders. New York City, New York: Barricade Books. ISBN 978-1-569-80157-4.
- Kleno, Larry (1980). Kim Novak on Camera. LaJolla, California: A.S. Barnes & Company. ISBN 978-0-498-02457-3.
- Statman, Alisa; Tate, Brie (2012). Restless Souls: The Sharon Tate Family's Account of Stardom, the Manson Murders, and a Crusade for Justice. New York City, New York: HarperCollins. ISBN 978-0-062-00804-6.
