= Dublin Nightmare =

1958 British film by John Pomeroy

- Directed by: John Pomeroy
- Written by: John Tully
- Based on: novel by Robin Estridge (as Philip Loraine)
- Produced by: Jon Penington
- Starring: William Sylvester; Marla Landi; Richard Leech
- Cinematography: Eric Cross
- Edited by: John Seabourne
- Music by: Edwin Astley
- Production company: Penington Eady Productions
- Distributed by: J. Arthur Rank Film Distributors (UK)
- Release date: October 1958
- Running time: 62 mins
- Language: English

Dublin Nightmare is a 1958 British second feature ('B') thriller film directed by John Pomeroy and starring William Sylvester, Marla Landi and Richard Leech. The screenplay was by John Tully based on the 1951 novel of the same title by Robin Estridge (as Philip Loraine).

== Plot ==
Irish nationalists plan to seize a security van to raise money for their movement. When one of his friends is murdered during the raid, photographer John Kevin begins to investigate.

== Cast ==
- William Sylvester as John Kevin
- Marla Landi as Anna Monti
- Richard Leech as Steve Lawlor
- Harry Hutchinson as Finian
- William Sherwood as Edward Dillon
- Jack Cunningham as O'Connor
- Gerald Lawson as tramp
- Helen Lindsay as Mary O'Callaghan
- Pat O'Sullivan as Danny O'Callaghan
- John McCarthy as Morgan

Paddy Joyce as first pub customer

== Critical reception ==
The Monthly Film Bulletin wrote: "The Dublin locations are the principal point of interest in this unconvincing, weakly acted and sluggish second feature, which despite its brevity, barely escapes dullness; a less cautious treatment of the material available in the backgrounds of the city at night might have made a more exciting film."

Picturegoer wrote: "With a little more ingenuity and energy this could have been a distinguished thriller. As it is, the Dublin backgrounds, distinctive acting and a neatly concocted plot make it a decently satisfying one ... Though some of the Irish 'character' is a little ebullient, the film moves with a swift sense of purpose."

TV Guide called it "a routine crime drama."

In British Sound Films: The Studio Years 1928–1959 David Quinlan rated the film as "average", writing: "Irish version of The Third Man."

In The Radio Times Guide to Films Tony Sloman gave the film 2/5 stars, writing: "This is a totally shameless B-movie rip-off of The Third Man, with Dublin substituted for Vienna and the IRA taking the place of penicillin. William Syivester and Marla Landi are perfectly adequate stand-ins for Joseph Cotten and Alida Valli."

Britmovie described it as a "compact b-movie based on the novel by Robin Estridge and effectively directed by John Pomeroy that transposes a Third Man style plot to 1950s Ireland."
