= Emma Townshend =

British writer

Emma Townshend (born 28 March 1969) is an English writer and journalist, and the elder daughter of the Who's Pete Townshend. She has previously worked as an academic, a musician and in adult education, but since 2006 has been the Independent on Sunday’s garden columnist. Townshend has written for most of the broadsheet newspapers and has been a guest on radio and TV including the BBC World Service, Woman's Hour, and Newsnight.

== Early life ==
Emma Townshend was the first child born to Pete Townshend and his wife Karen (née Karen Astley, 12 June 1947, Grappenhall, Cheshire) in 1969. Three of Townshend's grandparents were professional musicians who had been in armed forces entertainment during the war. Emma's father is the lead guitarist and principal songwriter of the rock band The Who; he has said that when Emma was born, "the room was filled with angels," although he later speculated that this might have been an acid flashback. When she was a baby, her parents took her to the Woodstock festival in a carrycot, and she was brought up following the teachings of the Indian spiritual leader Meher Baba.

== Writing career ==
Townshend attended St Paul's Girls' School. She studied history at King's College, Cambridge then specialised in history of science, receiving a master's degree from Imperial College, London. She then returned to Cambridge for doctoral studies in the Department of History and Philosophy of Science. Before writing up her thesis she left Cambridge to sign to East West Records, part of Warner Music. She began teaching undergraduates in Cambridge and subsequently taught in adult education for over 15 years, including for the Workers Educational Association, Birkbeck and Oxford University's Department of Continuing Education; she was also a Visiting Lecturer at City University, London.

As a journalist, Townshend has written for The Telegraph, The Guardian, The Observer, The Times and The Independent, about a range of subjects, often environmental, ranging from the English landscape and long-distance walking to conceptual art. She has also written about sport, profiled public figures such as scientist Richard Dawkins, and often reviews for the Independent’s books pages. She has written in support of using public funds to preserve significant archive material in the history of British pop music.

Townshend is the author of Darwin's Dogs: How Darwin's Pets Helped Form a World-Changing Theory of Evolution (2009) which was generally well-received, and she made several appearances to promote the title. The book looks at how Darwin used his much-loved dogs as evidence of his continuing argument that all animals including human beings descended from one common ancestor, examining parts of Darwin's own writings in The Descent of Man.

In Darwin's bicentenary year, 2009, Townshend wrote on Darwin’s connections with the Royal Botanic Garden for Kew Magazine, gave talks at the British Museum, and led guided tours of Kew. She continues to have links with the Royal Botanic Gardens: in December 2013 a tour of Kew plus afternoon tea with Townshend was auctioned for charity, by her employers the Independent on Sunday newspaper, selling eventually for £720.

== Music career ==
In 1982, Townshend and her sister Minta made their professional music debut singing back-up on A Bao A Qu, a four-track EP by their aunt, singer-songwriter Virginia Astley, named after a Jorge Luis Borges story. Emma sang back-up on Pete Townshend's White City: A Novel album released in 1985, and appeared in the film of the same title, named after an area of West London. She was also guest vocalist at two November 1985 London concerts by her father's Deep End supergroup.

Townshend's record deal with EastWest Records, part of the Warner Music Group, extended from 1995-1998, and she released the album Winterland in 1998, named after the celebrated sixties San Francisco music venue. The album received good reviews. She provided vocals for "We Can Fly Away", written by Sandy McLelland and Paul Lowin, which was the theme song in the 1999 made-for-TV movie The Magical Legend of the Leprechauns. This song has become her most popular, despite its lack of common ground with material issued under her own name.

== Discography ==
Releases:

- Five-A-Side-Football Remixes (Maxi) (2 versions), EastWest, 1998
- Five-A-Side-Football Remixes (CD, Maxi), EastWest, 1998
- Five-A-Side-Football (12", Promo), EastWest, 1998
- The Last Time I Saw Sadie (12", Promo), EastWest, 1998
- The Last Time I Saw Sadie (CD, Maxi), EastWest, 1998
- Winterland (CD, Album), EastWest, 1998

Appeared On:

- A Bao A Qu (Single), "We Will Meet Them Again," Why Fi Records, 1982
- From Gardens Where We Feel Secure (Album), "A Summer Long Since Passed," Happy Valley / Rough Trade, 1983
- White City: A Novel (Album), ATCO Records, 1985
- White City: A Novel (CD, LP), ATCO Records, 1985
- White City: A Novel (CD, Album, RM, RE), Hip-O Records, 2006
- Pearl + Umbra (CD), "Canyon: Split Asunder," Bella Union, 1999

Tracks Appeared On:

- Platinum (2xCD), Five-a-Side Football, Warner Music UK 1998
