= Diane Pearson =

British novelist and editor

- Born: Diane Margaret Pearson; 5 November 1931; Croydon, London, England, United Kingdom
- Died: 15 August 2017 (aged 85)
- Occupation: Novelist
- Spouse: Richard Leeper McClelland (a.k.a. Richard Leech)

Diane Pearson (5 November 1931 in London – 15 August 2017 in London) was a British book editor and romance novelist, who has been translated into several languages.

In 1994, she won the British Book Award for Editor of the Year and was the President of the Romantic Novelists' Association from 1986 to 2011, when she retired.

== Biography ==
Margaret Diane Pearson was born on 5 November 1931 in Croydon, London, England, daughter of Miriam Harriet Youde and William Holker. During her childhood, she often visited her grandparents in a village on the Surrey/Kent borders. She attended Secondary School in Croydon.

At 16, she started her career in publishing with Jonathan Cape Ltd, and was senior editor at Transworld for 38 years. In 1994, she won the British Book Award for Editor of the Year.

In addition, she is the writer of several short stories and novels, which have been translated into several languages.

In 1975, she became the second wife of the Irish actor and physician Richard Leeper McClelland (a.k.a. Richard Leech) (1922–2004). As a widow, she lived in her native London until her death in 2017.

== Bibliography ==
=== Whitman Saga ===
1. The Marigold Field (1969)
2. Sarah Whitman (1971) a.k.a. Sarah

=== Single novels ===
- The Loom of Tancred (1967) a.k.a. Bride of Tancred
- Csardas (1975)
- The Summer of the Barshinskeys (1984)
- Voices of Summer (1992)
- Chaos at High Altitude (2012)

=== Anthologies in collaboration ===
- Sarah Whitman; The Runaways; Nunaga; The Winds of War (1972) (with Victor Canning, Duncan Pryde and Herman Wouk)
- Proof; The Old Man of the Sea; Stillwatch, The Summer of the Barshinskeys (1985) (with Dick Francis, Ernest Hemingway and Mary Higgins Clark)
- Reader's Digest Condensed Books (1995) (with Terence Strong, Mary Higgins Clark and Ewan Clarkson)
- The Censor (2009) in Love Me, Love Me Not
- Count the Days (2011) in Romance and Mystery Under the Northern Lights
