= Robin Estridge =

British author and screenwriter (1920–2002)

Robin Estridge, a.k.a. Robin York and Philip Loraine (1 May 1920 – 24 October 2002) was a British author of suspense fiction and a screenwriter.

== Biography ==
He was born Robin Phillip Lorraine Estridge on 1 May 1920, in London, England.

His real name was Robin Estridge, but he mostly published novels under the name of Robin York and Philip Loraine. Today, he has been somewhat forgotten by many readers as well as collectors of crime fiction. Sea Change (1982) is one of his best-known novels.

An introductory note to And to My Beloved Husband written under the pseudonym Philip Loraine (Ace Books, N.Y., year of publication missing, originally published by M.S. Mill Co, 1950) provides the following information about the author:

"Philip Loraine has published a number of top-notch suspense novels in the United States, and under his real name has written other books, as well as film and television scripts."

Loraine has also been a sailor in the Royal Navy, a theatrical designer, a dishwasher in Paris, a journalist, and a tubercular patient. Besides five years in the United States, he also resided in Corsica, Italy, Yugoslavia, Spain and, as seldom as possible, his native England. He liked writing, peace and quiet, sunshine, and new places. He disliked bad food, bad manners, people who think of themselves as intellectual, bigotry, politics, and politicians.

Estridge died on 24 October 2002 in Astoria, Oregon.

== Selected novels ==
- White Lie the Dead (Hodder, 1950)
- Exit with Intent (Stoughton, 1950)
- And to my Beloved Husband (M&S, 1950)
- The Break in The Circle (H&S, 1951) (filmed as Break in the Circle in 1955)
- The Dublin Nightmare (H&S, 1951) (filmed as Dublin Nightmare in 1958)
- The Angel of Death (H&S, 1961)
- Day of the Arrow (Collins, 1964) (filmed as Eye of the Devil in 1966)
- W.I.L One to Curtis (Collins, 1967)
- The Dead Men of Sestos (Collins, 1968)
- A Mafia Kiss (Collins 1969)
- Photographs Have Been Sent to Your Wife (Collins, 1971)
- Voices in an Empty Room (Collins, 1973)
- Ask the Rattlesnake (Collins, 1975)
- Lions Ransom (Collins, 1980)
- Sea Change (Collins, 1982)
- Death Wishes (Collins, 1983)
- Gold and the Dance of Death (unpublished, 1990s)
- Dead Men are Dangerous (unpublished, 1990s)

== Screenwriting credits ==
- 1975 Permission to Kill
- 1966 The Boy Cried Murder
- 1966 Eye of the Devil
- 1963 Drums of Africa
- 1962 Escape from Zahrain
- 1960 No Kidding
- 1959 Northwest Frontier
- 1957 Checkpoint
- 1957 Campbell's Kingdom
- 1957 Dangerous Exile
- 1955 Above Us the Waves
- 1955 Simba
- 1954 The Young Lovers
- 1953 A Day to Remember

== Sources ==
- Allen J. Hubin: CRIME FICTION IV. A Comprehensive Bibliography, 1749-2000, 2010 Revised Edition (Locus Press)
- Keating, H. R. F. (1985). "Loraine, Philip". In Reilly, John M. (ed.). Twentieth Century Crime and Mystery Writers (Second ed.). St. James Press.
- Marvin Lachman: Death of a Mystery Writer, in: CADS 59, December 2010
