= Château de Hautefort =

French château and gardens

Coordinates: 45.2599°N 1.1452°E

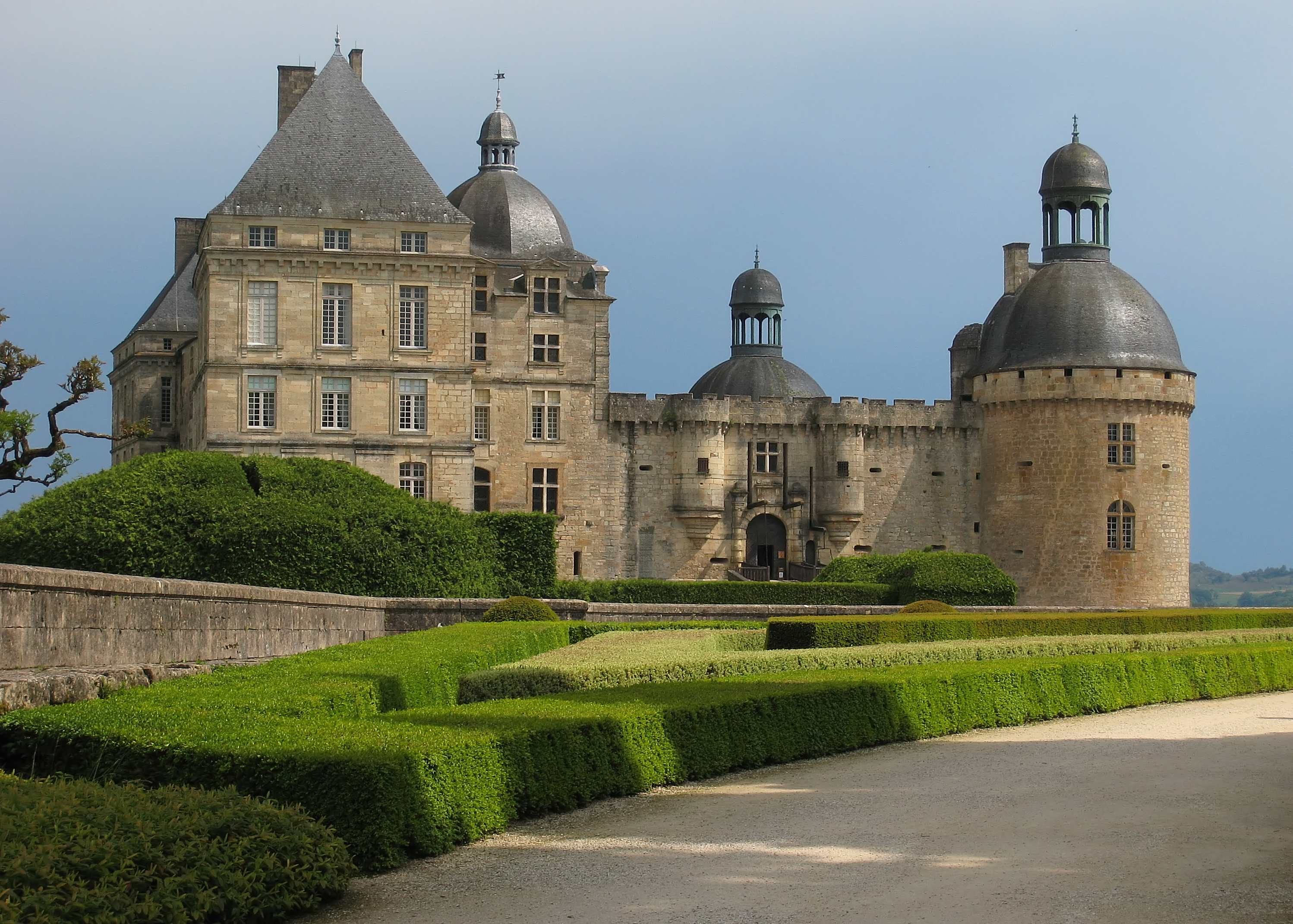
Château de Hautefort

The Château de Hautefort is a French château and gardens located in the town of Hautefort in the Dordogne. The castle was originally a medieval fortress that was reconstructed in the 17th century, and embellished with a jardin à la française. In 1853 the landscape architect the Count of Choulot redesigned the gardens, adding a landscape garden, geometric flower gardens, topiary gardens imitating the domes of the château, and a long tunnel of greenery. Next to the formal gardens is a hill with an Italian garden with winding shaded paths. Notable trees in the park include a Magnolia grandiflora and a Cedar of Lebanon. The gardens are listed by the Committee of Parks and Gardens of the Ministry of Culture of France as one of the Notable Gardens of France.

== In popular culture ==
The Château de Hautefort features in two films:

- Eye of the Devil, a 1966 British mystery/horror film with supernatural and occult themes, where the château (named Château Bellenac in the film) features extensively. Directed by J. Lee Thompson, the film stars Deborah Kerr, David Niven, Flora Robson, Donald Pleasence, David Hemmings, Kim Novak, and a young Sharon Tate.
- Ever After, a 1998 romantic drama inspired by "Cinderella", with the château portraying the character Prince Henry's castle, later the Grande Dame; many scenes were shot in and around the Dordogne. The film stars Drew Barrymore, Anjelica Huston, Dougray Scott and Jeanne Moreau.
