= Richard Leech =

Irish actor (1922–2004)

- in Lease of Life (1954)
- Born: Richard Leeper McClelland; 24 November 1922; Dublin, Ireland
- Died: 24 March 2004 (aged 81); London, England
- Years active: 1949–1988
- Spouse(s): Helen Uttley (died) Diane Pearson (m. 1975)
- Children: 2

Richard Leeper McClelland (24 November 1922 – 24 March 2004), known professionally as Richard Leech, was an Irish actor.

Richard Leeper McClelland was born in Dublin, Ireland, the son of Isabella Frances (Leeper) and Herbert Saunderson McClelland, a lawyer. He was educated at Haileybury and Trinity College, Dublin, and qualified as a doctor in 1945. He worked in that profession from 1945–6, then became a full-time actor.

His numerous film credits include The Dam Busters (1955) (playing Dinghy Young), Night of the Demon (1957), Yangtse Incident: The Story of HMS Amethyst (1957), Ice Cold in Alex (1958), Tunes of Glory (1960), Young Winston (1972), Gandhi (1982), and the acclaimed The Shooting Party (1985).

On television Richard Leech appeared in Dickens of London, The Barchester Chronicles, Smiley's People, A Family at War 1971× Wthree episodes of The Avengers in different roles, Redcap, Danger Man, The Doctors, The New Avengers, The Duchess of Duke Street, and starred in a Doctor Who story called The Sun Makers.

He married twice, with Helen Hyslop Uttley and Diane Pearson, and had two children: Sarah-Jane McClelland and Eliza McClelland.

== Filmography ==
=== Film ===
- The Temptress (1949) (film debut) (uncredited)
- The Cruel Sea (1953) as Sailor (uncredited)
- Lease of Life (1954) as Carter
- Children Galore (1955) as Harry Bunnion
- The Prisoner (1955) as Minor Role (uncredited)
- The Dam Busters (1955) as Squadron Leader H. M. Young, D.F.C.
- The Feminine Touch (1956) as Casualty Doctor
- It's Never Too Late (1956) as John Hammond
- The Long Arm (1956) as 'Nightwatchman' / Gilson
- The Iron Petticoat (1956) as Alex
- Time Without Pity (1957) as Proprietor of Espresso Bar (uncredited)
- The Good Companions (1957) as Ridvers
- Yangtse Incident (1957) as Lt. Strain RN
- These Dangerous Years (1957) as Captain Brewster
- The Birthday Present (1957) as Hawkins
- Night of the Demon (1957) as Inspector Mottram
- Gideon's Day (1958) as Minor Role
- The Moonraker (1958) as Henry Strangeways
- The Wind Cannot Read (1958) as Hobson
- Ice Cold in Alex (1958) as Captain Crosbie
- A Night to Remember (1958) as First Officer William Murdoch
- Dublin Nightmare (1958) as Steve Lawlor
- The Horse's Mouth (1958) as Hodges (uncredited)
- A Lady Mislaid (1958) as George
- Tunes of Glory (1960) as Captain Alec Rattray
- The Terror of the Tongs (1961) as Insp. Bob Dean
- I Thank a Fool (1962) as Irish Doctor
- The Wild and the Willing (1962) as Police Inspector
- The War Lover (1962) as Murika
- Ricochet (1963) as Alan Phipps
- The Cracksman (1963) as Detective Sergeant
- The Flood (1963) as Alec Weathersfield
- Walk a Tightrope (1964) as Doug Randle
- Life at the Top (1965) as Doctor
- The Fighting Prince of Donegal (1966) as Phelim O'Toole
- The Railway Children (1970) as Doctor (voice)
- Young Winston (1972) as Moore
- Got It Made (1974) as Dr. Allen
- The Mirror Crack'd (1980) as Director of Photography (uncredited)
- Gandhi (1982) as Brigadier
- Champions (1984) as Beck
- The Shooting Party (1985) as Dr. West
- A Handful of Dust (1988) as Doctor (final film role)

=== Television ===
- Misalliance (1954) as Johnny Tarleton
- The Third Man (1960) as Inspector Workington
- One Step Beyond (1961) as Orderly
- The Avengers (1962-1967) as Various Roles
- No Hiding Place (1963) as Clive Johnson
- The Human Jungle (1963) as Captain Maple
- Danger Man (1965) as Colonel Montes
- Dixon of Dock Green (1965) as Major Summers
- Redcap (1966) as Sgt. Cole
- Public Eye (1966) as Joe Lodge
- The Saint (1967) as Stewart
- The Gold Robbers (1969) as Richard Bolt
- The Doctors (1969-1971) as Dr. Roger Hayman
- Public Eye (1972) as Summers
- Special Branch (1973) as Chief Supt. Knight
- The Gathering Storm (1974) as Admiral Pound
- Edward the Seventh (1975) as Sir Charles Dilke
- Bill Brand (1976) as Waverley
- The Duchess of Duke Street (1976) as Judge
- The New Avengers (1976) as Craig Terrison
- Doctor Who (1977) as Gatherer Hade
- Rooms (1977) as Arthur Hatchett
- The Enigma Files (1980) as Joby King
- The Barchester Chronicles (1982) as Wildfrid Thorne
- I Remember Nelson (1982) as Country Gentleman
- Smiley's People (1982) as Uncle Harry
- Lytton's Diary (1986) as Sir Arnold Latham
