= Edwin Astley =

British composer (1922–1998)

Ted Astley
- Born: Edwin Thomas Astley; 12 April 1922; Warrington, Lancashire, England
- Died: 19 May 1998 (aged 76); Goring-on-Thames, Oxfordshire, England
- Spouse: Hazel Balbirnie (m. 1945)
- Children: 5, including Jon and Virginia
- Family: Emma Townshend (granddaughter)

Edwin Thomas "Ted" Astley (12 April 1922 – 19 May 1998) was a British composer. His best known works are British television themes and scores, most notably the main themes for Department S, The Saint, Danger Man and The Baron. He also successfully diversified into symphonic pop and the arrangement of his theme to The Saint, as re-recorded by Orbital, reached number three in the UK singles chart.

== Early life ==
Astley was born in Warrington, Lancashire, to Lawrence Astley and Mary Alice Pester. He served in the Second World War as a musician in the Royal Army Service Corps band playing saxophone and clarinet for the troops.

== Career ==
In the early 1950s, Astley was arranging for Geraldo. His song "I Could Never Tell" was written by Edwin and Billy Bowen as an entry into a song writing contest when they were both serving in the army. Edwin won the prize of £250 and later used this money to pay for his wedding to Hazel Balbirnie. "I Could Never Tell" was later recorded by both Vera Lynn and Richard Tauber.

His own band, the Ted Astley Orchestra, became well known in the north of England, and he wrote songs for performers such as Anne Shelton.

He wrote music for many British television series of the 1950s and 1960s, including incidental music for The Champions, and the opening titles to The Adventures of Robin Hood (with the exception for the closing titles), Danger Man (known as Secret Agent in North America, where a new graphic opening credit sequence was added which featured the song "Secret Agent Man" by P.F. Sloan and Steve Barri and was followed by the original English credits accompanied by Astley's High Wire theme), Department S, Randall and Hopkirk (Deceased), The Saint, Gideon's Way and The Baron. All of these programmes were ITC Entertainment productions.

Astley also wrote the orchestral and "opera" score for the Hammer Films version of The Phantom of the Opera (1962).

Astley wrote two arrangements of his own theme for The Saint, a slow version used in the black and white episodes and a more up-tempo arrangement of the same theme for the colour episodes. He then wrote a second theme, used in the second season of the colour episodes' In all 3 closing themes. he used the tune that Leslie Charteris had written, which had previously been used in films and on radio. Charteris' theme would also open its main theme to Return of the Saint and would close its theme for its TV movies of The Saint which starred Simon Dutton (neither of which were composed by Astley); however, Astley's original Saint theme was chosen for the film of the same name.

Astley also wrote two themes for Danger Man – one for the 30-minute series transmitted from 1960 to 1962 entitled "The Danger Man Theme", and a new theme for the 60 minute series (1964–68) entitled "High Wire". Astley was asked to write music for The Prisoner, but had to withdraw because he felt that he would be unable to create Patrick McGoohan's vision for the score – due to McGoohan being too busy to hold meetings with him.

However, Astley showed his diversity by writing the music for Sir Kenneth Clark's BBC documentary series Civilisation (1969), and scoring several British Transport Films including Diesel Train Ride (1959), Broad Waterways (1959/60) and The Signal Engineers (1962).

In 1997, Astley found himself at number three on the UK singles chart as composer of "The Saint", 33 years after he wrote it, which had been revived by Orbital for the new Saint movie. His last work was a 1998 symphonic interpretation of the Who's music called Who's Serious: The Symphonic Music of the Who, which followed 1995's Symphonic Music of the Rolling Stones.

== Recordings ==
Astley's actual recorded output is quite sparse, consisting of a few singles and albums of the music from The Saint and Danger Man. These were only available in the United States until 1997 when he arranged for CDs to be issued in the UK, where the albums were expensive collector's items. Other recordings included the soundtrack for International Detective, a few library records which were only semi-official and a series of albums made by the London Symphony Orchestra which featured his work.

Recently the complete recordings of the score to Randall and Hopkirk (Deceased) was released by Network DVD in the UK. The three disc box-set featured over two hundred recorded music cues from the series, and a book detailing the music production.

In 1977, Astley wrote the orchestral score for Street in the City, a song recorded for the Pete Townshend and Ronnie Lane album Rough Mix.

== Personal life ==
Astley married Hazel Balbirnie in 1945, and had five children. Their eldest daughter, Karen, married Pete Townshend. Their son, Jon Astley, produced and remastered The Who's reissues. Daughter Virginia Astley is a singer-songwriter. His other children are Virginia's twin Alison, and son Gareth.

Astley retired in the late 1970s, and died in 1998. Recognition of his death was limited to brief obituaries in The Times and The Independent. However, tributes later appeared on television and in print.

== Legacy ==
In 2001, Jools Holland presented a television tribute called Astley's Way. Holland had recorded the Danger Man theme earlier, and he appeared with Jools Holland's Rhythm and Blues Orchestra to play "High Wire", plus various other themes and incidental music composed by Astley. The documentary also included interviews with his widow, son Jon, daughter Virginia and son-in-law Pete Townshend.

== Selected filmography ==
- Devil Girl from Mars (1954)
- The Gay Dog (1954)
- The Happiness of Three Women (1954)
- The Crowded Day (1954)
- The Hornet's Nest (1955)
- You Lucky People (1955)
- Fun at St. Fanny's (1955)
- The Case of the Mukkinese Battle-Horn (1956)
- Kill Her Gently (1957)
- At the Stroke of Nine (1957)
- The Woman Eater (1958)
- Dublin Nightmare (1958)
- Naked Fury (1959)
- The Man Who Liked Funerals (1959)
- The Giant Behemoth (1959)
- The Mouse That Roared (1959)
- The Day They Robbed the Bank of England (1960)
- Passport to China (1961)
- Follow That Man (1961)
- A Matter of WHO (1961)
- The Phantom of the Opera (1962)
- The World Ten Times Over (1963)
- The Syndicate (1968)
- Digby, the Biggest Dog in the World (1973)

== Television ==
- The Vise (1954)
- Colonel March of Scotland Yard (1955)
- The Adventures of Robin Hood (1955)
- The Adventures of Sir Lancelot (1956)
- The Buccaneers (1956)
- Ivanhoe (1958)
- International Detective (1959)
- Danger Man (1960)
- The Saint (1962)
- Gideon's Way (1965)
- Seaway (1965)
- The Baron (1966)
- Department S (1968)
- Randall and Hopkirk (Deceased) (1969)
- Whoops Baghdad (1973)
