= List of compositions by Libby Larsen =

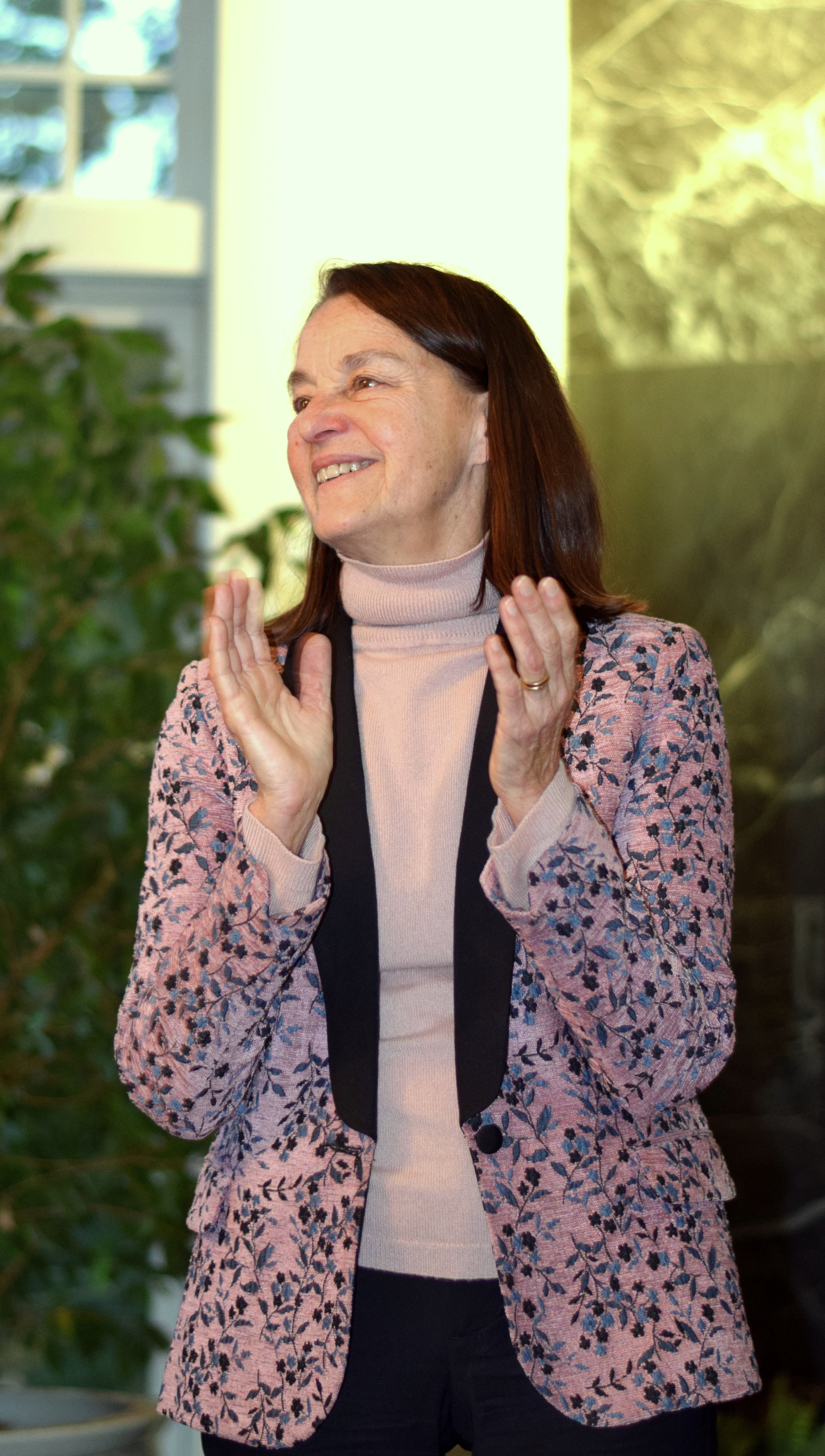
Libby Larsen in October 2017

The following is a chronological list of compositions by Libby Larsen, divided into genre groups.

== List of works ==
=== Opera ===
- Some Pig (1973)

Children's opera in one act

- Moon Drop (1976 & 1980)

full evening performance with water slides, tapes, and costumes

- The Silver Fox (1979)

Family opera in one act; John Olive, libretto

- Clair de Lune (1984)

two-act chamber opera; libretto by Patricia Hampl

- Frankenstein: The Modern Prometheus (1990)

full-length music drama; libretto by Libby Larsen

- A Wrinkle in Time (1991)

one-act opera; libretto by Walter Green

- Mrs. Dalloway (1993)

full-length music drama in two acts; libretto by Bonnie Grice

- Eric Hermannson's Soul (1998)

full-length opera with orchestra; libretto by Chas Rader-Shieber

- Barnum's Bird (2000)

chamber choral opera in two acts; libretto by Bridget Carpenter

- Dreaming Blue (2002)

opera in one act for child actor, SATB soloists, children's chorus, rhythm chorus, and drumming group; libretto by Libby Larsen

- Every Man Jack (2006)

chamber opera, based on the life of Jack London; libretto by Philip Littell

- Picnic (2009)

opera in three acts based on the play by William Inge; libretto by David Holley

=== Orchestral ===
- Weaver's Song & Jig (1978)

chamber orchestra and string band

- Pinions (1981)

violin concerto with chamber orchestra

- Deep Summer Music (1982)

full orchestra

- Overture: Parachute Dancing (1983)

full orchestra

- Symphony: Water Music (Symphony No. 1) (1985)

full orchestra

- Coming Forth Into day (Symphony No. 2) (1986)

soprano solo, baritone solo, SATB chorus, full orchestra; various texts

- What the Monster Saw (1987)

full orchestra, optional slides, adapted from the opera Frankenstein.

- Collage: Boogie (1988)

full orchestra

- Concerto for Trumpet and Orchestra (1988)

C trumpet and full orchestra

- Concerto: Cold, Silent Snow (1989)

flute, harp, chamber orchestra

- Tambourines! (1991)

full orchestra

- The Atmosphere as a Fluid System (1992)

solo flute, percussion, string orchestra

- Marimba Concerto: After Hampton (1992)

solo marimba, full orchestra

- Piano Concerto: Since Armstrong (1992)

solo piano, full orchestra

- Symphony No. 3: Lyric (1992)

full orchestra

- Overture for the End of a Century (1994)

full orchestra

- Song-Dances to the Light (1994)

SA chorus, Orff instruments, full orchestra (or piano); text by young people

- Ring of Fire (1995)

full orchestra

- Blue Fiddler (1996)

full orchestra

- Fanfare: Strum (1996)

orchestra, no strings

- Roll Out the Thunder (1997)

full orchestra

- Spell On Me That Holy Hour: Overture to Tsvetaeva (1997)

full orchestra

- All Around Sound (1999)

full orchestra, cued CD; text by John Coy

- Solo Symphony (Symphony No. 5) (1999)

full orchestra

- String Symphony (Symphony No. 4) (1999)

string orchestra

- Still Life With Violin (2000)

solo violin and full orchestra

- Fanfare: Sizzle (2001)

full orchestra

- Brandenburg for the New Millennium (2002)

trumpet, marimba, electric guitar, amplified harpsichord, and string orchestra

- Song Concerto (2005)

saxophone (alto and soprano) and chamber orchestra

- Bach 358 (2008)

full orchestra

- Evening in the Palace of Reason (2008)

string orchestra, solo string quartet

- Encircling Skies (2009)

double choir, full orchestra, full wind ensemble, three marimbas, three pianos

- Sacred Vows (2009)

tenor, baritone, narrator, SATB chorus, full orchestra; text by U Sam Oeur

- The Moabit Sonnets (2011)

two sopranos, tenor, bass, chamber orchestra; text by Albrecht Haushofer, trans. M.D. Herter Norton

- Six or Seven Dances (2024)

string orchestra and harp

=== Band ===
- Grand Rondo (1988)

concert band

- Sun Song (1991)

concert band

- Brass Flight (1996)

brass choir

- Concert Dances (1996)

concert band

- Short Symphony (1996)

concert band

- Hambone (1999)

concert band

- Strut (2003)

concert band

- River Fanfare (2004)

British brass band

- An Introduction to the Moon (2005)

symphonic wind ensemble, tuned water glasses, recorded voice, eight collaborative improvisations

- Cri de Coeur (2009)

solo euphonium and wind ensemble

=== Instrumental ===
- Circular Rondo, Canti Breve (1974)

oboe and guitar

- Three Pieces for Treble Wind and Guitar (1974)

treble winds and guitar

- Piano Suite (1976)

solo piano

- Impromptu (1998)

flute, clarinet, and bassoon

- Corker (1979)

clarinet and percussion

- Jazz Variations for Solo Bassoon (1977)

solo bassoon

- Tango (1978)

solo guitar

- Bronze Veils (1979)

trombone, two percussion

- Saraband: In profane style (1979)

solo guitar

- Cajun Set (1980)

guitar and string trio

- Scudding (1980)

solo cello

- Black Roller (1981)

flute, oboe, clarinet, bassoon, piano, violin, viola (featured), and cello

- Aubade (1982)

solo flute

- Four on the Floor (1983)

violin, cello, contrabass, piano

- Sonata In One Movement on Kalenda Maya (1983)

solo organ

- Up Where the Air Gets Thin (1985)

cello and contrabass

- With Love & Hisses (1985)

double woodwind quintet.
Accompanies the silent Laurel and Hardy film "Love and Hisses."

- Juba (1986)

cello and piano

- Song Without Words (1986)

clarinet and piano

- Astonishing Flight of the Gump (1987)

flute, oboe, bassoon, and piano

- Black Birds, Red Hills (1987)

clarinet, viola, and piano

- Fantasy on Slane

organ and flute

- Kathleen, as she was (1989)

oboe and harpsichord

- Aspects of Glory (1990)

solo organ

- Xibalba (1990)

bassoon and percussion

- Schoenberg, Schenker, and Schillinger (1991)

flute, oboe, viola, cello, and keyboard

- String Quartet Schoenberg, Schenker, and Schillinger (1991)

string quartet

- Dancing Solo (1994)

solo clarinet

- Fanfare for the Women (1994)

solo trumpet

- Slang (1994)

clarinet, violin, and piano

- Concert Piece for Tuba & Piano (1995)

tuba and piano

- Blessed be the Tie That Binds (1996)

solo organ

- Blue Third Pieces (1996)

flute or clarinet and guitar

- Brass Flight (1996)

brass choir

- Holy Roller (1997)

saxophone and piano

- Prelude on Veni Creator Spiritus (1997)

solo organ

- Brazen Overture (2000)

brass quintet

- Mephisto Rag (2000)

solo piano

- Neon Angel (2000)

violin, cello, clarinet (or saxophone), flute, piano, percussion, and cued CD

- Three for the Road (2000)

violin, cello, and piano

- The Atmosphere as a Fluid System (also known as "Sky Concerto) (2001)

flute and orchestra

- Barn Dances (2001)

flute, clarinet, and piano

- Trio for Violin, Cello, and Piano (2001)

violin, cello, and piano

- Viola Sonata (2001)

viola and piano

- Licorice Stick (2002)

clarinet and piano

- On a Day of Bells (2002)

solo organ

- Argyle Sketches (2003)

solo guitar

- Bid Call (2003)

alto saxophone, cello

- Fanfare for Humanity (2003)

brass ensemble

- Firebrand (2003)

flute/piccolo, violin, cello, and piano

- Pocket Sonata (2003)

oboe, alto saxophone, violin, cello, marimba/vibraphone, and piano

- Bee Navigation (2004)

solo clarinet

- Concertino for Tenor Steel Drum and Chamber Ensemble (2004)

tenor steel drum and chamber ensemble

- For Two (2004)

four-hand piano

- Gavel Patter (2004)

four-hand piano

- Pealing Fire (2004)

carillon

- Penta Metrics (2004)

solo piano

- Wait a Minute (2004)

saxophone quartet

- Yellow Jersey (2004)

B♭ clarinet duet

- Blue Windows: After Marc Chagall (2005)

woodwind quintet and piano

- Fanfare for a Learned man (2005)

brass quintet

- Now I Pull Silver (2005)

amplified flute and prepared CD; text by A. E. Stallings

- Slow Structures (2005)

flute, cello, and piano

- Song Concerto (2005)

saxophone and chamber orchestra

- Trio in Four Movements (2005)

four movements
flute, violin, and harp

- Concert Piece for Bassoon and Piano (2006)

bassoon and piano

- Engelberg: Trio for Brass and Organ (2006)

trumpet, horn in F, trombone, and organ

- He Arose: A Fanfare for Easter (2006)

organ, two trumpet, two trombone, optional horn

- The Adventures of Wonderboy: Issue One (2008)

bass, sampler, narrator, cartoons, strings

- Double String Quartet, J.S.B. (2008)

double string quartet

- Quartet: She Wrote (2008)

string quartet

- Ricochet (2008)

two marimbas

- Ricochet (piano) (2008)

solo piano

- Downwind of Roses in Maine (2009)

flute, B♭ clarinet, and mallet percussion

- Over, Easy (2009)

violin, viola, cello, and piano

- In Such a Night (2010)

two violas and recorded voice; text by William Shakespeare

- Like Blind Men Tapping in the Dark (2010)

one marimba, two performers

- Rodeo Queen of Heaven (2010)

clarinet, violin, cello, and piano

- Ursa (2010)

tuba and wind ensemble

- 4 ½: A Piano Suite (2016)

solo piano

=== Choral ===
- Eine Kleine Snailmusik (1978)

SA and contrabass; text by May Sarton

- All Shall Be Well (1979)

SA, soprano solo, soprano recorder, triangle, and keyboard; text by Libby Larsen

- Dance Set (1980)

SATB, clarinet, cello, percussion, piano; textless

- Double Joy (1982)

SATB divisi, handbells, organ; text by Michael Thwaites

- In a Winter Garden (1982)

SATB, soprano and tenor solos, chamber orchestra; text by Patricia Hempl

- Everyone Sang (1983)

SATB, harp, two percussion; text by Siegfried Sassoon

- Ringeltanze (1983)

five movements
SATB, handbells, string orchestra; medieval French text

- A Creeley Collection (1984)

five movements
SATB, flute, percussion, piano; text by Robert Creeley

- Welcome Yule (1984)

TTBB and strings

- Clair de Lune (1985)

TTBB, tenor solo; text by Paul Verlaine

- I Love the Lord (1985)

SATB and organ; text by Nathan Everett

- Peace, Perfect Peace (1985)

SATB a cappella; text from Isaiah 26:3, Edward Bickersteth

- We Celebrate (1985)

SATB, piano or organ; text by John Cummins

- Who Cannot Weep, Come Learn of Me (1985)

SSA, mezzo-soprano and tenor solos; text from MS09.38 Trinity College

- Clair de Lune in Blue (1986)

SATB jazz choir, piano; textless

- Songs of Youth and Pleasure (1986)

four movements
SATB a cappella; Renaissance text

- Canticle of the Sun (1987)

SSAAA, finger cymbals, synthesizer, organ; text by St. Francis of Assisi

- A Garden Wall (1987)

unison choir, keyboard, Orff instruments, 7 speaking roles, and congregation

- Refuge (1988)

SSAA a cappella; text by Sara Teasdale

- The Settling Years (1988)

three movements
SATB, woodwind quintet, piano, percussion; 20th century biographical texts

- Three Summer Scenes (1988)

SATB, optional youth choirs, full orchestra; texts by William Carlos Williams, Lloyd Frankenburg, and Maurice Lindsay

- How it Thrills Us (1990)

SATB a cappella; text by Rainer Marie Rilke

- I Am a Little Church (1991)

SATB and organ; text by e.e. cummings

- Alleluia (1992)

SATB a cappella

- Deck the Halls (1992)

TTBB, five soloists, piano, handbells

- Eagle Poem (1992)

SATB, four-hand piano; text by Joy Harjo

- Missa Gaia—Mass for the Earth (1992)

SATB, SSA, soprano solo, oboe, strings, four-hand piano

- Mother, Sister, Blessed Holy (1992)

SATB, four-hand piano

- Pied Beauty (Glory to God) (1992)

SATB, four-hand piano; text by Gerard Manley Hopkins

- God As Ribbon of Light (1993)

SATB and organ; text by Sr. Mary Virginia Micka

- Canticle of Mary (1994)

SSA, four-hand piano or chamber orchestra; text from the Magnificat and Gregorian hymnal

- A Choral Welcome (1994)

SATB divisi, keyboard or orchestra; text by G. Galina

- I Just Lightning (1994)

SSAA and percussion; text by María Sabina

- Little Notes on A Simple Staff (1994)

SATB and piano; text by Siv Cedering

- Fanfare & Alleluia (1995)

SATB, brass, handbells, chimes, and organ

- I Arise Today (1995)

SATB and organ; text from St Patrick's Breastplate

- I Will Sing and Raise a Psalm (1995)

SATB and organ; text by St. Francis of Assisi

- Invitation to Music (1995)

SATB and string quartet, string orchestra, or piano; text by Elizabeth Bishop

- Seven Ghosts (1995)

five movements
SATB with soprano solo, brass quintet, piano, and percussion; 20th century biographical texts

- Today, This Spring (1995)

three songs
SA and piano; text by Emily Dickinson, Charles Wilson, and Jan Kimes

- Eleanor Roosevelt (1996)

SATB with soprano and mezzo-soprano solos, speaker, clarinet, cello, piano and percussion; text by Sally M. Gall

- So Blessedly It Sprung (1996)

SATB, oboe, viola, and harp; text from 12th century poetry by Adam of Saint Victor

- I Find My Feet Have Further Goals (1997)

SATB a cappella; text by Emily Dickinson

- Love Songs (1997)

SATB and piano; text based on love songs by American woman poets

- May Sky (1997)

SATB divisi, a cappella; text by Tokuji Hirai, Neiji Ozawa, Reiko Gomyo, and Suiko Matsushita

- Reasons for Loving Harmonica (1997)

SATB and piano; text by Julie Kane

- Density of Light (1998)

SATB, treble choir, brass; text by Thomas H. Troeger

- Ring the Bells (1998)

SSA children's chorus and piano; text by M.K. Dean

- Stepping Westward (1998)

SSA, handbells, oboe, and marimba; text by Denise Levertov

- Sweet & Sour Nursery Rhymes (1998)

SATB and french horn; text by Eugene Field and traditional

- By a Departing Light (1999)

SATB a cappella, text by Emily Dickinson

- Day Song (1999)

SSA a cappella; text by N. F. S. Grundtvig, and Libby Larsen

- Is God, Our Endless Day (1999)

SATB a cappella; text by Julian of Norwich

- A Salute to Louis Armstrong (1999)

from choral suite Seven Ghosts.
SATB divisi and piano; text by Louis Armstrong

- To a Long Loved Love (1999)

SATB, string quartet; text by Madeleine L'Engle

- Four Valentines: A Lover's Journey (2000)

four movements
six-voice male a cappella; text by James Joyce, William Shakespeare, and Karl Joseph Simrock

- Falling (2000)

SATB chorus, SATB quartet, SAT trio, trumpet, piano, and percussion; text by James Dickey

- How To Songs (2000)

SSA (children's) chorus

- Lord, Before This Fleeting Season (2000)

SATB a cappella; text by Maryann Jindra

- Psalm 121 (2000)

SSAA divisi a cappella; text from and by Psalm 121, Patricia Hennings, and John Muir

- Touch the Air Softly (2000)

SSAA a cappella; text by William Jay Smith

- The Witches Trio (2001)

SSAA a cappella; text by William Shakespeare

- If I Can Stop One Heart From Breaking (2001)

SSA, woodwind quintet, percussion, and strings; text by Emily Dickinson

- Jack's Valentine (2001)

SSAA; text by Aldeen Humphreys

- The Ballerina and the Clown (2002)

SSA and harp; text by Sally Gall

- Flee We to Our Lord (2002)

SATB a cappella; text by Julian of Norwich

- Come Before Winter (2003)

SATB, baritone solo, orchestra or piano; text by Arthur Mampel

- I It Am: The Shewings of Julian of Norwich (2003)

SATB divisi, soprano, countertenor, baritone, and chamber orchestra; text by Julian of Norwich

- Womanly Song of God (2003)

SSAA divisi a cappella; text by Catherine de Vinck

- A Young Nun Singing (2003)

SSA a cappella; text by anonymous, Juana Inés de la Cruz, and Idea Vilarino

- Cry Peace (2004)

SATB divisi a cappella; text adapted by Libby Larsen

- Jesus, Jesus, Rest Your Head (2004)

two or three-part, solo voice, and piano; traditional text

- Natus Est Emmanuel (2004)

SSAA divisi a cappella; anonymous text from Piae Cantiones

- Praise One (2004)

SATB, SATB favori, orchestra; text adapted by Libby Larsen from Psalms 146, 147, 148, and 150

- The Shepherds and the Angels (2004)

SATB, soprano and baritone solos, organ and brass ensemble; text from Luke 2:8-20

- Giving Thanks (2005)

SSAA and string quartet; text by Chief Jake Swamp

- God So Loved the World (2005)

SATB a cappella; text from John 3:16-17

- I Dream of Peace (2005)

SATB and percussion; text by children of former Yugoslavia

- The Nothing That Is (2005)

SATB, baritone solo, three speaking voices and chamber ensemble; text adapted by Libby Larsen

- The Summer Day (2005)

SSAA and string quartet; text by Mary Oliver

- Western Songs (2005)

SATB a cappella; text from American Folksongs

- Of Music (2006)

SSAA and four-hand piano; text by Emily Dickinson

- The Blackbird (2007)

TTBB and piano; text by Wallace Stevens

- Crowding North (2007)

three pieces
SATB, guitar, flute, oboe, bassoon, and string quartet

- Four Meditations of Mechthild of Magdeburg (2007)

SATB, organ, handbells; text by Mechthild of Magdeburg

- I Lift My Eyes to the Hills (2007)

SATB, handbells, organ; text from Psalm 121

- Novum Gaudium (2007)

SATB a cappella; text from and by Ecce Novum Gaudium and Angelus Emittitur

- A Simple Gloria (2007)

SATB a cappella; text by M. K. Dean

- Whitman's America (2007)

SATB a cappella; text by Walt Whitman

- To Sing (2008)

SSA and piano; text by Kasey Zitnik

- A Book of Spells (2009)

SSAA and piano; text by Z. E. Budapest

- Free, Fearless, and Female (2009)

SSAA and marimba; text by Judy Belski, Anonymous Pampa Poem trans. by W. S. Merwin, and Anna Swir

- Celebration Mass-Lutheran Edition (2010)

SATB choir, congregation, organ, and optional handbells, brass quintet/quartet and percussion/timpani; text from traditional Lutheran liturgy

- Chain of Hope (2010)

SATB, baritone, actress, piano; text from various letters and writings regarding Frederick Douglass; libretto by Libby Larsen, Kathleen Holt and Jeanne Soderberg

- Concord Fragments (2010)

SSAA, oboe, clarinet and piano; text adapted by Libby Larsen

- Arctic Spring (2011)

SATB chorus and string quartet or piano; text by Tom Sexton

- Celebration Mass-Catholic Edition (2011)

SATB choir, congregation, organ; text from traditional Catholic liturgy

- If Music Be the Food of Love (2011)

SATB; text by Henry Heveningham

- Matineé: The Fantom of the Fair (2014)

soprano, baritone, violin, cello, piano with animated slideshow by Toni Lindgren based on Paul Gustavson's 1939 comic book of the same name - première April 6, 2014, Rivers School Conservatory, Weston, Massachusetts

=== Voice ===
- Saints Without Tears (1976)

soprano, flute, and bassoon; text by Phyllis McGinley

- Selected Poems of Rainer Maria Rilke (1978)

soprano, flute, guitar, and harp; text by Rainer Maria Rilke

- Cowboy Songs (1979)

soprano and piano; text by Anonymous, Belle Starr, and Robert Creeley

- Three Rilke Songs (1980)

high voice and guitar; text by Rainer Maria Rilke

- A Verse Record of my Peonies (1980)

tenor, tape, and percussion; text by Masaoka Shiki

- Before Winter (1982)

baritone and organ; text by Arthur Mampel

- Me (Brenda Ueland) (1987)

soprano and piano; text by Brenda Ueland

- Songs From Letters (1989)

soprano and piano or chamber ensemble; text by Calamity Jane

- When I Am An Old Woman (1990)

soprano and piano; text by Jenny Joseph

- Sonnets From the Portuguese (1991)

soprano and chamber ensemble or piano; text by Elizabeth Barrett Browning

- How Lovely Are Thy Holy Groves (1992)

soprano and piano; text from the Chinook Psalter

- Perineo (1993)

baritone and piano; text by Roberto Echavarren

- Beloved, Thou Hast Brought Me Many Flowers (1994)

mezzo-soprano, cello, and piano; text by Elizabeth Barrett Browning, Hilde Doolittle, Rainer Maria Rilke, and Percy Bysshe Shelley

- Mary Cassatt (1994)

mezzo-soprano, trombone, orchestra and slides; text from the historical narrative and letters of Mary Cassatt

- Margaret Songs (1996)

soprano and piano; text by Willa Cather and Libby Larsen

- Chanting to Paradise (1997)

soprano and piano; text by Dickinson

- Lord, Make Me An Instrument (1997)

tenor and piano; text by St. Francis of Assisi

- The Ant and the Grasshopper (1998)

soprano and piano; text by Jeanne Shepard

- Late in the Day (1998)

soprano and piano; text by Jeanne Shepard

- Songs of Light and Love (1998)

soprano and chamber ensemble; text by May Sarton

- Love After 1950 (2000)

five movements
mezzo-soprano and piano; text by Rita Dove, Julie Kane, Kathryn Daniels, Liz Lochhead, and Muriel Rukeyser

- My Antonia (2000)

high voice and piano; text by Willa Cather

- Try Me, Good King: Last Words of the Wives of Henry VIII (2000)

five movements
soprano and piano; text by Katherine of Aragon, Anne Boleyn, Jane Seymour, Anne of Cleves, Catherine Howard, and Catherine Parr

- Hell's Belles (2001)

four movements
mezzo-soprano and handbells; text by Tallulah Bankhead, Billie Jean King, Gertrude Stein, and Nursery Rhyme

- Jazz at the Intergalactic Nightclub (2001)

tenor and piano; text by Thomas McGrath

- Notes Slipped Under the Door (2001)

soprano, solo flute and orchestra; text by Eugenia Zukerman

- Raspberry Island Dreaming (2002)

mezzo-soprano and full orchestra; text by Joyce Stuphen and Patricia Hampl

- Raspberry Island Dreaming (Piano/Vocal) (2002)

mezzo-soprano and piano; text by Joyce Stuphen and Patricia Hampl

- De Toda la Eternidad (2003/2005)

soprano and wind ensemble or piano; text by Sor Juana Inez de la Cruz

- I Love You Through the Daytimes (2003)

baritone and piano; ancient Egyptian text

- This Unbearable Stillness: Songs from the Balcony (2003)

soprano and string quartet; text by Dima Hilal and Sekena Shaben

- Fern Hill (2004)

solo tenor; text by Dylan Thomas

- A Pig in the House (2004)

tenor and piano; Alvin Greenburg

- Sifting Through the Ruins (2005)

mezzo-soprano, viola, and piano; text by Hilary North, anonymous, Alicia Vasquez, Martha Cooper, and Ted Berrigan

- Take (2006)

soprano and piano; text by Margaret Atwood

- Center Field Girl (2007)

soprano and piano; text by Michele Antonello Frisch

- A Quiet Song (2007)

baritone and piano; text by Brenda Ueland
written in memory of Bruce Carlson of the Schubert Club

- Righty, 1966 (2007)

soprano, flute, and piano; text by Michele Antonello Frisch

- Within the Circles of Our Lives (2007)

soprano, baritone, and wind ensemble; text by Wendell Berry

- Far in a Western Brookland (2008)

tenor and piano; text by A. E. Housman

- Forget Me Not (2008)

soprano and tenor duet and piano; anonymous text from Cupples and Leon Given book of poems

- This Unbearable Stillness: Songs from the Balcony, Orchestral Version (2008)

soprano, percussion I, II, III, celeste, and string orchestra; text by Dima Hilal and Sekeena Shaben

- Song (2009)

solo soprano; text by e.e. cummings

- The Strange Case of Dr. H.H. Holmes (2010)

baritone and prepared piano; text by H. H. Holmes aka Herman Mudgett
