= Contemporary classical =

Contemporary classical may refer to:

- Contemporary classical music, a period or genre of art music
- New Classical architecture, an architectural movement
