= All Shall Be Well (album) =

Studio album by Virginia Astley
- Released: April 1992
- Genre: Dream pop; Classical pop
- Label: Happy Valley Records
- Producer: Virginia Astley

Virginia Astley chronology
Hope in a Darkened Heart (1986)	All Shall Be Well (1992)	Had I The Heavens (1996)

All Shall Be Well is the third studio album by English singer and songwriter Virginia Astley. Released in April 1992, it includes contributions by Kate St. John, who worked with Virginia Astley as part of the Ravishing Beauties, and Virginia's daughter Florence.

== Track listing ==
No.	Title	Writer(s)	Singer	Length
1.	"My Smallest Friend"	Virginia Astley	Virginia Astley; Florence Astley	4:48
2.	"All Shall Be Well"	Virginia Astley	Virginia Astley	3:45
3.	"You Take Me Away"	Virginia Astley	Virginia Astley	3:47
4.	"I Live for the Day"	Virginia Astley	Virginia Astley	3:11
5.	"Love's Eloquence"	Virginia Astley	Virginia Astley	3:46
6.	"Although I Know"	Virginia Astley		2:01
7.	"Martin"	Virginia Astley	Virginia Astley	3:22
8.	"Blue Sky, White Sky"	Virginia Astley; Kate St John	Virginia Astley; Kate St. John	4:05
9.	"How I Miss You"	Virginia Astley	Virginia Astley	3:44
10.	"My Smallest Friend (Instrumental)"	Virginia Astley		4:48
Total length:				37:27
