= Virginia Astley =

English singer-songwriter (born 1959)

- Born: 26 September 1959 (age 67); Garston, Hertfordshire, England
- Origin: Stanmore, Middlesex, England
- Genres: Ambient pop; new age; contemporary classical; field recording; baroque pop; chamber folk
- Occupations: Singer; songwriter; musician
- Instruments: Keyboards; flute; woodwinds; vocals
- Label: Various
- Parent(s): Edwin Astley and Hazel Balbirnie
- Relatives: Jon Astley (brother)
- Website: virginiaastley.com

Virginia Astley (born 26 September 1959) is an English singer-songwriter most active during the 1980s and 1990s. Her songwriting career started in 1980, with her classical training significantly influencing her music. Although most popular in Asia, notably in Japan, she remains a cult artist in her native England.

== Early life ==
Virginia Astley was born in Garston, Hertfordshire, England, alongside her twin, Alison, in 1959, the second daughter of composer Edwin Astley, noted for television themes such as The Saint, and his wife Hazel Balbirnie, who married in 1945. Virginia Astley's family was from the Warrington area and lived in Grappenhall, where her elder sister Karen was born in 1947. The family relocated to Stanmore, Middlesex, because of Edwin's work as a film and TV writer. In the early 1960s, he was musical director at ITC Entertainment in Borehamwood, the company responsible for TV series such as The Saint and Danger Man.

In 1968, her sister Karen married Pete Townshend of The Who. In the 1970s, Virginia's elder brother, Jon Astley, became a tape operator for Eric Clapton, and worked his way up to becoming a re-masterer and record producer.

== Music career ==
Virginia began learning piano at the age of six and flute at 14. After leaving school, she studied at the Guildhall School Of Music. Her first professional appearance in public was as a busker outside South Kensington tube station. In 1980, she auditioned for a new band from Clapham, the Victims of Pleasure. Astley, playing keyboards, worked with them for a short while playing in clubs and pubs around London. The band released three singles between 1980 and 1982 before splitting up.

Afterward, Astley wrote, arranged and performed music with Skids frontman Richard Jobson for the album The Ballad Of Etiquette. Their collaboration continued when Jobson moved to Belgian label Les Disques Du Crépuscule, and Astley contributed to the Crépuscule compilation The Fruit of the Original Sin. She also contributed as part of The Dream Makers (in collaboration with filmmaker Jean Paul Goude) for a cover version of "La Chanson d'Helene" (Helen's Song), showcasing an early example of her distinctive vocal style.

It was during this early period that Astley started to give serious consideration to releasing her own material; however, nothing immediately came of these plans. Then in 1981, she signed to the small UK label Why-Fi and recorded a series of songs. A school friend, Jo Wells (Kissing the Pink) and a university friend Nicky Holland both contributed as did Tony Butler, Mark Brzezicki and Peter Hope-Evans. Astley then received an offer from another Why-Fi artist, Troy Tate, for a supporting band position with The Teardrop Explodes. In the 1990s, finding that her musical style was popular in Japan, she went on to collaborate with Asian artists.

=== Ravishing Beauties ===
She recruited Nicky Holland and another university friend, Kate St. John to form the band the Ravishing Beauties. The trio joined The Teardrops in Liverpool during the winter of 1981 for a series of dates at a small clubs and a UK tour in early 1982. They also recorded with Echo & the Bunnymen, Skids, and Siouxsie and the Banshees.

Kate St. John and Nicky Holland went on to maintain solo careers in the 1990s at the time of Astley's re-emergence in Japan. The Ravishing Beauties did not record as a band, but appeared on radio shows, including a John Peel Session on BBC Radio 1 in April 1982.

The Ravishing Beauties first played at Club Zoo in Liverpool and followed this with the support tour with The Teardrop Explodes. Astley wrote most of the band's songs, some of which appeared on her first solo project with Why-Fi. The band was short lived, with St. John first becoming a model, and then eventually a member of The Dream Academy, while Holland did session work and joined Tears for Fears.

=== Solo work ===
One of the first musicians Astley recorded with was Richard Jobson. Together with John McGeoch and Josephine Wells, they created a musical backdrop for Jobson's poetry. This work was released as The Ballad of Etiquette in late 1981. Later, Astley went with Jobson to perform in Japan. She also worked on other people's projects, including work for Les Disques Du Crépuscule label, playing piano and arranging music for Richard Jobson and Anna Domino. She also had a track on From Brussels with Love in 1982. Sessions followed with Richard Jobson and Russell Webb for the final Skids album, Joy, which featured Astley on flute and as a backing singer.

Astley recorded a solo album, She Sat Down And Cried for Crépuscule but this was withdrawn, eventually being released three years later as Promise Nothing. She signed with Why-Fi in mid-1981 and recorded an EP called A Bao A Qu, the title taken from a Malayan legend featured in Jorge Luis Borges's 1967 Book of Imaginary Beings. This was produced by Jon Astley and Phil Chapman. Using a demo studio in Wapping called Elephant Studios, Astley recorded the song that was to place her in the indie top 10 (No. 8) in 1983: "Love's a Lonely Place to Be", a song of despair and anxiety in spite of its Christmas carol sound. The song would later form part of the 1986 LP Hope in a Darkened Heart. In 1982, Astley also played piano on her brother-in-law Pete Townshend's album, All the Best Cowboys Have Chinese Eyes.

The album From Gardens Where We Feel Secure was released in August 1983, and was recorded on Astley's own label Happy Valley and distributed by Rough Trade, which has since reissued it. The album achieved a placing of No. 4 in the indie chart, but neither single nor album was listed in the mainstream charts.

In 1983, Astley established a more permanent line-up with string players Audrey Riley, Jocelyn Pook and Anne Stephenson, with guests such as drummer Brian Nevill and composer Jeremy Peyton Jones.

In 1984, Astley played keyboards on tour with Prefab Sprout around the time of their first album, and she also did sessions for their Kitchenware Records labelmates, Martin Stephenson and the Daintees, Vic Godard and Zeke Manyika.

In 1984, she signed to Arista but left to join Elektra Records. "Darkness Has Reached its End" and "Tender" were both recorded at this time. When Elektra UK folded she went to WEA where she subsequently recorded the album Hope in a Darkened Heart, with Ryuichi Sakamoto producing in 1986.

In 1989, Astley collaborated with Eurythmics member Dave Stewart on a track called "Second Chance", included on the Lily Was Here soundtrack.

The success of her 1986 album Hope in a Darkened Heart in Japan meant that Astley was asked to sign to Nippon Columbia with whom she recorded a further two albums, All Shall Be Well in 1992 and Had I The Heavens in 1996. The following year, the first track from the album, "Some Small Hope" was released, a collaboration with David Sylvian.

Since then, Astley has guested on CDs by both Hideaki Matsuoka and the Silent Poets. From Gardens Where We Feel Secure was re-issued with a new cover in 2003, and in 2006 she released her first album of new material in ten years, entitled The Words Between Our Words. This mini album features Astley reciting her own poetry to a backing of harp music played by her daughter, Florence. In 2007, she premiered a long poem "Ecliptic", with flute, harp and birdsong.

== Discography ==
=== With Victims of Pleasure ===
- "When You're Young" (1980), P.A.M. – 7"
- "Slave to Fashion" (1981), Rialto – 7"
- "Jack and Jill" (1982), Rialto – 7"

=== Solo ===
Albums

- She Sat Down and Cried (1981), Crépuscule — withdrawn before commercial release, issued in 1984 as Promise Nothing.
- From Gardens Where We Feel Secure (1983), Rough Trade – UK Indie No. 4
- Hope in a Darkened Heart (1986), WEA
- All Shall Be Well (1992), Nippon Columbia
- Had I the Heavens (1996), Nippon Columbia
- The Words Between Our Words (2006) – online release credited to Virginia and her daughter Florence Astley
- Maiden Newton Ecliptic (2007), Artension
- The Singing Places (2023)

Singles and EPs

- A Bao A Qu (1982), Why-Fi – 10-inch EP
- "Love's a Lonely Place to Be" (1983), Why-Fi — UK Indie No. 8
- "Melt the Snow" (1985), Rough Trade — UK Indie No. 27
- "Tender" (1985), Elektra
- "Darkness Has Reached Its End" (1985), WEA
- "Le Song" (1986)
- "Charm" (1986), WEA Japan
- "Some Small Hope" (1987), WEA — with David Sylvian
