= Robert Llewelyn (priest) =

Robert Charles Llewelyn (6 July 1909 – 6 February 2008) was a Church of England priest and a teacher and writer on prayer. He did much to make Julian of Norwich better known in the English-speaking world: the London Times described him as "a much-read authority" who "introduced many thousands to her work".

== Life ==
Robert Llewelyn was born in Exmouth, Devon, on 6 July 1909. He went to Pangbourne College and King Edward VI School, Southampton, where he became head boy, before studying mathematics at Pembroke College, Cambridge (BA 1932, MA 1936).

In 1932 he started to teach mathematics at Westminster School, where his pupils included the actor Peter Ustinov and the politician Tony Benn. He was ordained deacon in 1936 at St Paul's Cathedral, London, and priest the following year, but continued to teach at Westminster School, while spending time with the Society of St John the Evangelist, which had a monastery close to the school. In 1939 he was given a year's leave of absence to go to a missionary community at Cawnpore in India. The outbreak of World War II prevented him from returning to England and he spent several years at the co-educational Hallet War School in Nainital where his role was to set up and run a school for children of British officials and others who were unable, because of the war, to go to public schools in England.

In 1946 he returned to Westminster School as chaplain. The following year he was invited to establish a diocesan school for older children in the Bahamas, where Spence Burton, a member of the Society of St John the Evangelist, was bishop. He remained there for about five years. In 1951 he was appointed headmaster of Sherwood College, Nainital.

In 1966 he again returned to England, but was almost immediately asked to go back to India as chaplain to a mission house of nuns belonging to the Community of St Mary the Virgin at Pune and priest-in-charge of St Mary's Church, Pune. In 1969 he was made dean and provost. He stayed in Pune for six years.

From 1972 to 1975 he was warden of Bede House, a convent and retreat house of the Sisters of the Love of God near Staplehurst in Kent.

On his retirement in 1976 he accepted an invitation to be chaplain at the shrine of Julian of Norwich in St Julian's Church, Norwich, where he offered prayer, provided spiritual counsel to visitors and gave talks. He was based there until 1990.

In 1998 he was awarded the Cross of St Augustine, the second highest international award in the Anglican Communion, in recognition of the contribution his books had made to spirituality. Giving him the award, the then Archbishop of Canterbury, George Carey, described him as "one of the outstanding spiritual teachers of our age".

== Writings ==
Llewelyn was a prolific writer with a special interest in Julian of Norwich, whose thinking he did much to expound and popularise. As well as editing her works and writing and editing books about her, in With Pity Not with Blame he attempted to apply her theological ideas to modern day life. Love Bade Me Welcome combines an account of Julian's argument that there is no wrath in God, with a practical guide to prayer.

Among his publications are:

- All Shall Be Well: The Spirituality of Julian of Norwich for Today, Paulist Press, 1982
- Our Duty and Our Joy: Sacrifice of Praise, Darton, Longman and Todd, 1993
- Love Bade Me Welcome, Darton, Longman and Todd 1985 (new edition 1999)
- A Doorway to Silence: Contemplative Use of the Rosary, Darton, Longman and Todd, 1986
- Memories and Reflections, Darton, Longman and Todd, 1988
- The Fountain Within: Praying St John's Gospel, Darton, Longman and Todd, 1989
- With Pity, Not with Blame: Contemplative Praying with Julian of Norwich and 'The Cloud of Unknowing', Darton, Longman and Todd, 2nd edition 1989
- Thirsting for God, Darton, Longman and Todd, new edition 2000
- Prayer and Contemplation/Distractions are for Healing, Fairacres Publications, 2000

He was general editor of a series of books containing daily readings from major spiritual writers of the past, published by Darton, Longman and Todd, and compiled three of the books himself - two of extracts from the writings of Julian of Norwich, and one of extracts from The Cloud of Unknowing. The first of these books, published in 1980, was Enfolded in Love: Daily Readings with Julian of Norwich: as at May 2017, over 120,000 copies had been sold and this book has played a considerable role in bringing Julian of Norwich to a much wider readership.

He edited some anthologies of spiritual writing:

- Julian: Woman of our Day, Darton, Longman and Todd, 1985
- The Joy of the Saints: Spiritual Readings Throughout the Year, Darton, Longman and Todd, 1988
- Circles of Silence: Explorations in Prayer with Julian Meetings, Darton, Longman and Todd, 1994
