= Keep On Working =

Single by Pete Townshend

from the album Empty Glass
- B-side: "Jools and Jim"
- Released: 1980
- Recorded: 1980
- Genre: Rock
- Length: 3:23
- Label: Atco
- Songwriter: Pete Townshend
- Producers: Pete Townshend; Chris Thomas

Pete Townshend UK singles chronology
"A Little Is Enough" (1980)	"Keep On Working" (1980)	"Face Dances, Pt. 2" (1982)

Official audio
- "Keep On Working" on YouTube

"Keep On Working" is a song written and composed by the English rock musician Pete Townshend, guitarist for the Who. The song was released as a single, and is on his third solo studio album Empty Glass (1980).

== Background ==
As with its album-mate "Empty Glass", "Keep On Working" was a leftover from the Who's eighth studio album Who Are You (1978). However, upon Townshend's decision to make a solo studio album, the song was resurrected.

Pete Townshend has since said that the song was created in an attempt to replicate the Kinks' songwriter Ray Davies' style of writing. In 1982, Townshend said, "Ray's always been a big influence on me. I've never been able to write in the same way, though I've often tried. In fact, I'm terrible at it. I think 'Keep on Working' tries to be a Kinks song but it just doesn't work."

== Release and critical reception ==
In 1980, "Keep On Working" was released as the final single from Empty Glass in the UK, following his success with "Let My Love Open the Door" and "Rough Boys". Backed with its fellow Empty Glass track "Jools and Jim", the song was a commercial flop, failing to chart at all. The single wasn't released in the US, where "A Little Is Enough" was issued instead.

AllMusic critic Stephen Thomas Erlewine criticized "Keep On Working" for being "a little artier than it needs to be".
