= Rémy Martin =

Brand of cognac

- Founded: 1724; 302 years ago
- Founder: E. Rémy Martin
- Headquarters: Cognac, France
- Products: Cognac
- Revenue: ▲€622.2 million (2023)
- Parent: Rémy Cointreau
- Website: remymartin.com

Rémy Martin (French pronunciation: [ʁemi maʁtɛ̃]) is a French firm that primarily produces and sells cognac and the brand name of the cognac it produces. Founded in 1724 and based in the commune of Cognac, it is among the oldest cognac producers still in existence. and one of the "big four" cognac houses (along with Hennessy, Courvoisier and Martell), responsible for producing most of the world's cognac. The brand specialises in creating Cognac Fine Champagne.

The brand is owned by the spirits conglomerate Rémy Cointreau, which it co-founded in 1990. Rémy Martin typically represents around 90% of the group's operating profit, selling around 2.2 million nine-litre cases of cognac annually.

Rémy Martin is also part of the Comité Colbert, an association "to promote the concept of luxury".

== History ==
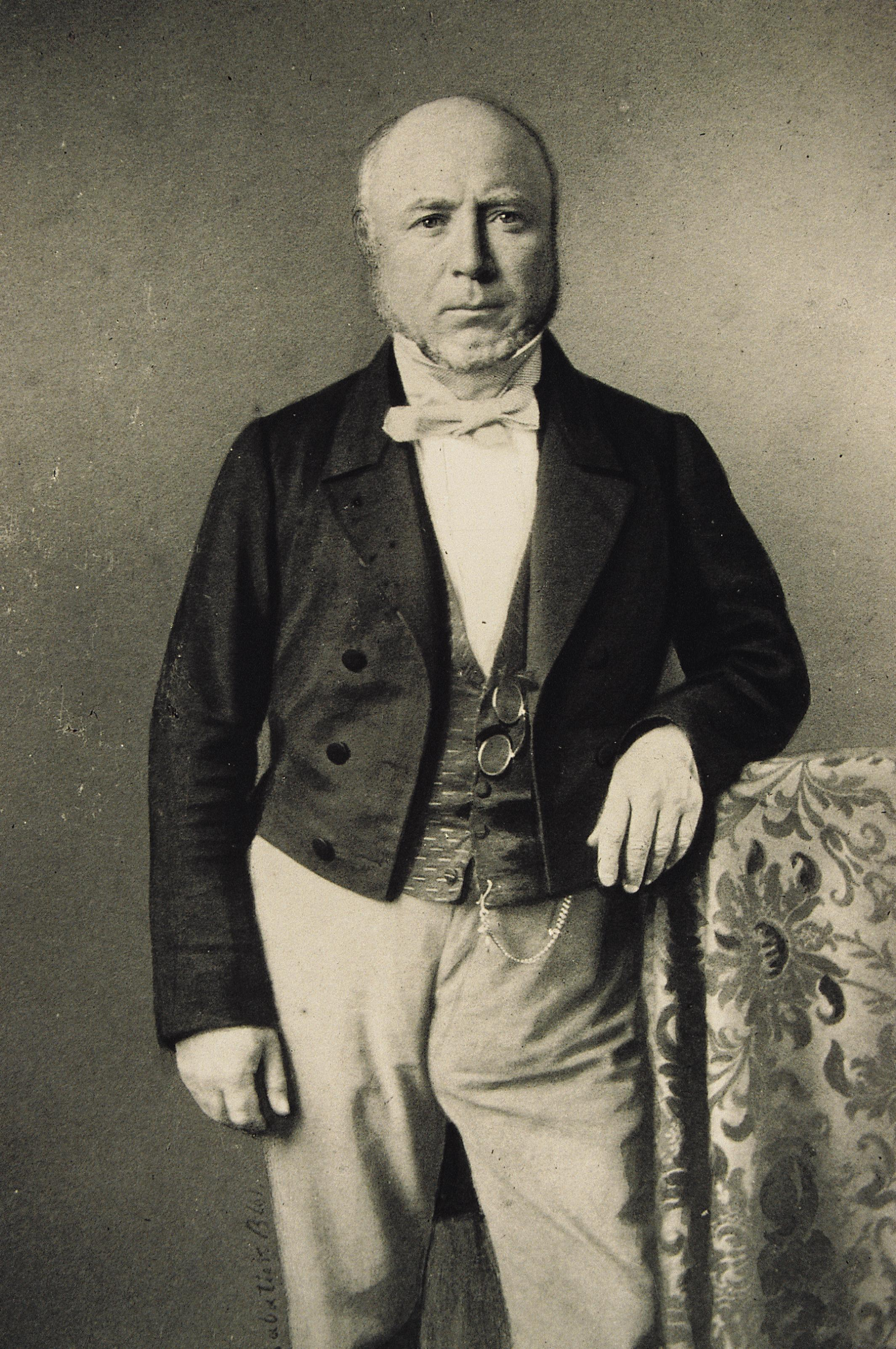
Paul-Emile Rémy Martin

The name Rémy Martin comes from the company founder, born in 1695 near Rouillac in southwestern France. A vintner by trade, in 1724 he created a cognac trading house. On his death in 1773, the business passed to his grandson, also named Rémy. In 1841, Paul-Emile Rémy Martin assumed control and oversaw great growth. He added a logo to the bottles and cases; a centaur after Sagittarius, Martin's own zodiac sign. The Rémy Martin logo continues; in China it's réntóumă (人头马), literally "man-headed horse".

In the interwar period, André Renaud, a lawyer, merchant, and partner in E. Rémy Martin & Co. since 1910, took the lead. In 1927, he popularized VSOP Fine Champagne. Rémy Martin cognacs were then sold worldwide. After World War II, Rémy Martin continued to rise under André Hériard-Dubreuil, André Renaud's son-in-law. At the death of André Renaud in 1965, André Hériard-Dubreuil became president. His children joined him, notably his daughter Dominique Hériard-Dubreuil, who became general manager in 1988, and president two years later. In 1991, the House of Rémy Martin incorporated Rémy Cointreau into the business.

In 1980, at the beginning of the reform and opening up, Rémy Martin ventured into China with the Dynasty brand (Dynasty Wine Ltd), the first foreign wine maker and the second joint venture in all of China.

In the 2010s Rémy Martin experienced a significant sales downturn after Chinese austerity measures targeted expensive gifts.

== Production ==
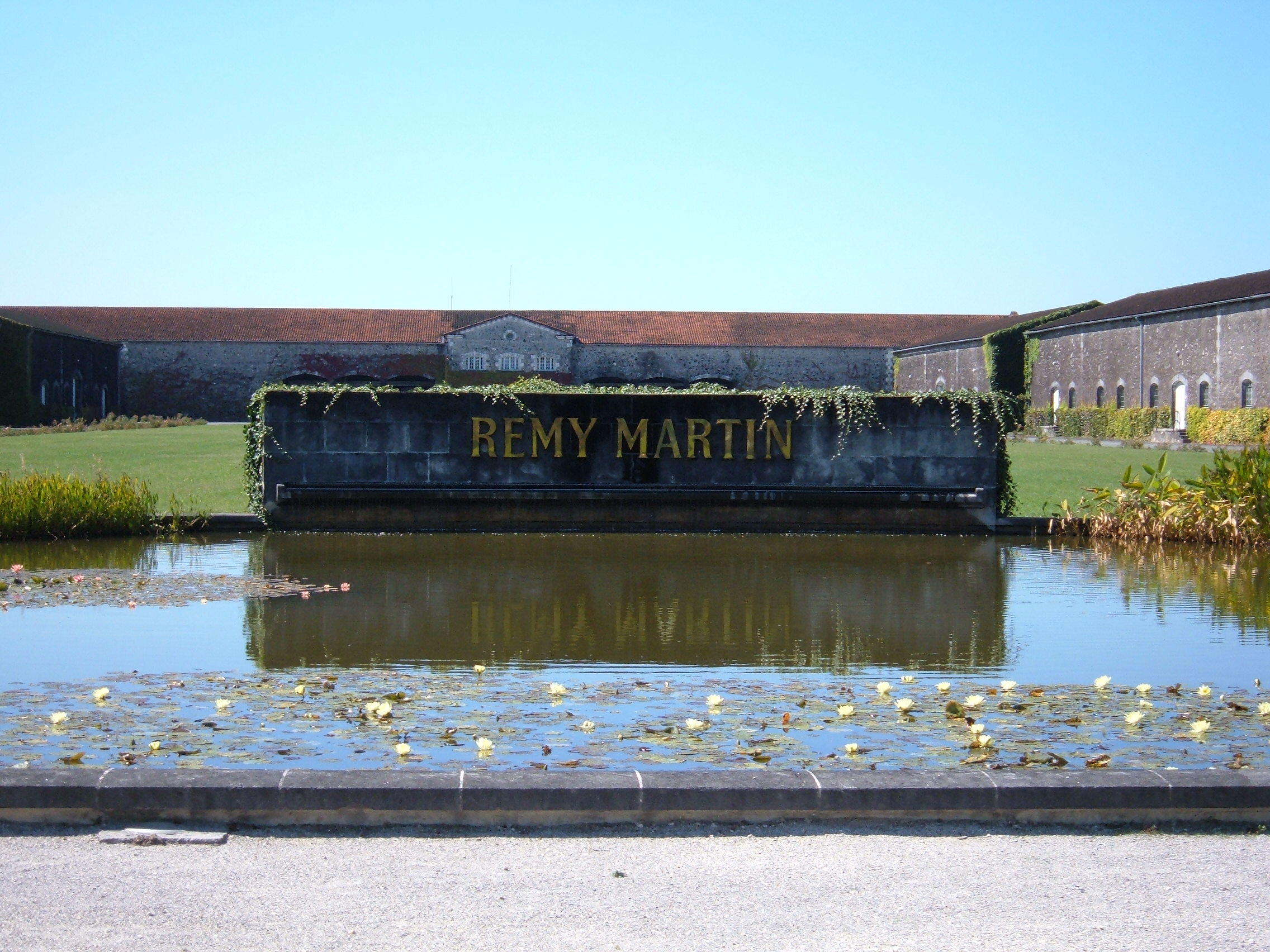
Rémy Martin buildings

Rémy Martin cognacs have the Cognac Fine Champagne appellation, meaning they come only from a blend of eaux-de-vie from the Grande Champagne and Petite Champagne crus, with at least 50% Grande Champagne. Being from chalky soils, these eaux-de-vie have ageing potential and a particular aroma due to the terroir. In the 1960s, l’Alliance Fine Champagne (the Fine Champagne Alliance) was created by André Hériard Dubreuil of the House of Rémy Martin. This cooperative brings together vintners from Petite Champagne and Grande Champagne, and supplies almost 90% of the eaux-de-vie of the House. Rémy Martin produces more than 80% of Fine Champagne cognacs.

Rémy Martin uses traditional distillation of the lees (sediment from grape fermentation) in small copper stills. Ageing takes place in oak barrels of the Limousin type, during which alcohol evaporates (the angels' share), blackening the walls of the cellar. The eau-de-vie evolves, punctuated by resting and changes of barrel. The exchanges of wood, oxygen and eaux-de-vie are constant.

Depending on which style is sought, cognac can age in young or old oak barrels, with stronger or finer grain in the staves. The oldest cognacs may be stored in glass demi-johns (also called dame-jeannes) to prevent excessive evaporation. Finally, products from different aged spirits are mixed, to create a cognac.

The House's current Cellar Master, Baptiste Loiseau, took the position in 2014, at 34, following André Renaud, André Giraud, Georges Clot, and Pierrette Trichet.

== Products ==
=== Rémy Martin VSOP ===
Created in 1927, Rémy Martin VSOP is the biggest selling VSOP Cognac worldwide. The frosted bottle was introduced in 1972.

=== Rémy Martin VSOP Mature Cask Finish ===
Exclusive to European markets, VSOP Mature Cask Finish was created in 2011. Originating from the same terroirs of Grande and Petite Champagne, with the same specifications for distillation, after the final blending, this cognac spends another year in 20-year old oak barrels.

=== Rémy Martin 1738 Accord Royal ===
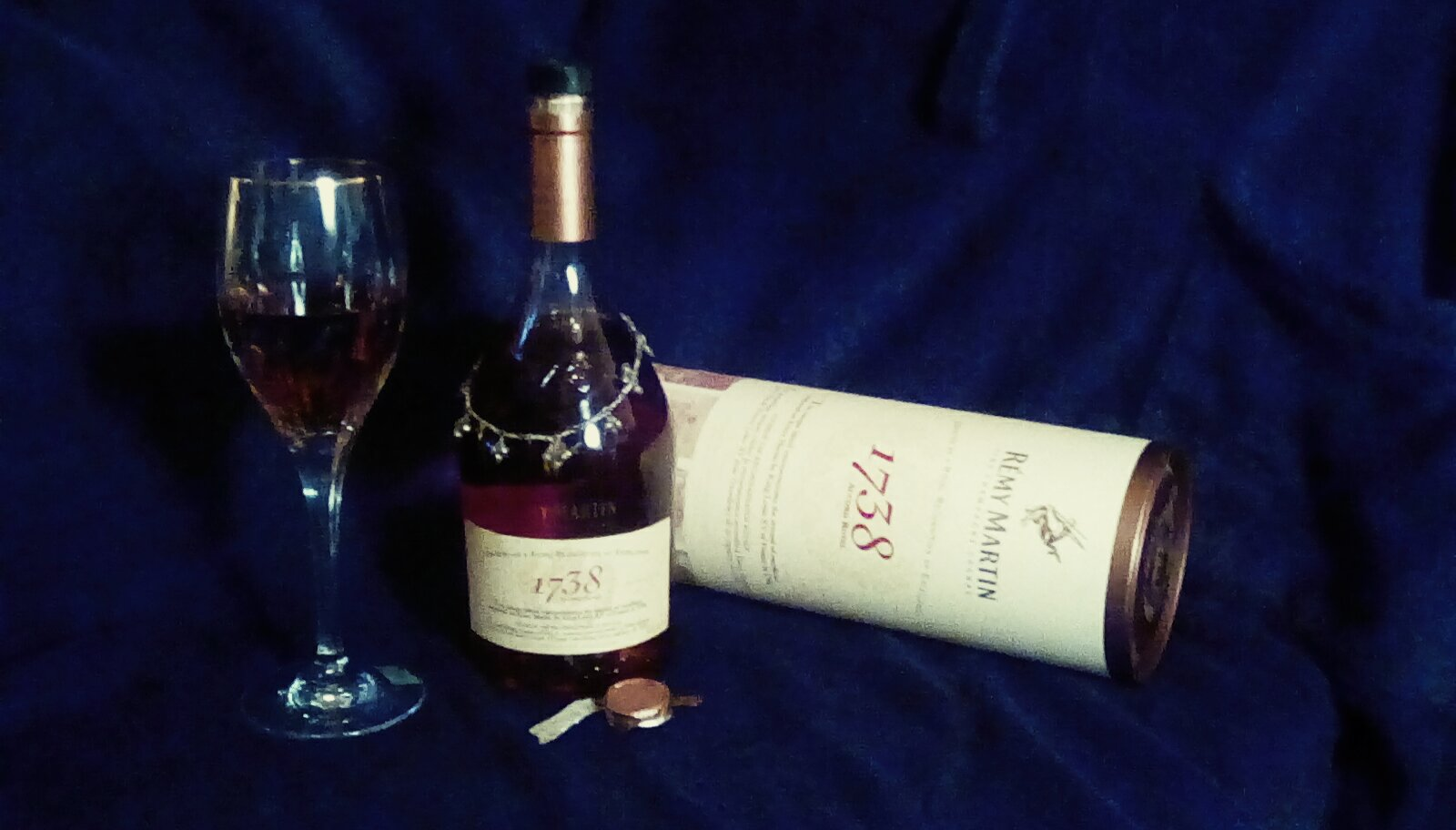
Rémy Martin 1738 Accord Royal

Launched in 1997 and named after the royal decree issued in 1738 when King Louis XV granted the Accord Royal to Rémy Martin in honor of his craftsmanship.

=== Rémy Martin CLUB ===
Exclusive to China, CLUB was created in 1986 and features an octagonal-shaped bottle. In 2015, Rémy Martin launched the CLUB Connected Bottle, the first NFC-enabled spirits bottle featuring high-security anti-counterfeiting measures.

=== Rémy Martin XO ===
Created by cellar master André Giraud in 1981, XO is a blend of up to 400 eaux-de-vie.

=== Rémy Martin Carte Blanche à Baptiste Loiseau ===
A single barrel blend selected by the cellar master, with all eaux-de-vie being at least twenty years old.

=== Rémy Martin Centaure De Diamant ===
Sold at an elevated price point, Centaure de Diamant uses only eaux-de-vie from the finest 10% of those available to Rémy Martin.

=== Rémy Martin Cellar Master Selection ===
Exclusive to duty free locations, Cellar 16 (Prime Cellar Selection) and Cellar 28 (Reserve Cellar Selection) are selected by the Cellar Master from aging cellars with unique characteristics.

=== Rémy Martin Louis XIII ===
Louis XIII cognac is produced and aged in oak barrels for 40–80 years in the Grande Champagne region of Cognac.

=== Rémy Martin V ===
In 2010, Rémy Martin introduced its first clear spirit, Rémy Martin V, in the US. Rather than using the oak barrel aging process, the liquid undergoes a proprietary 14 °F (−10 °C) filtration process, giving it a transparent color and subtle taste with hints of pear and a fresh minty aftertaste. It is not a cognac, but an eau-de-vie de vin.

== Marketing ==
The House of Rémy Martin partners with artists to represent its cognacs. These include Californian actor Jeremy Renner, Chinese actor and singer Huang Xiaoming, and Taiwanese mandopop singer Jolin Tsai. In 2008, the American photographer and director David LaChapelle created a bottle design. In 2013, Rémy Martin teamed up with American-Canadian singer and producer Robin Thicke to launch a limited edition of VSOP.

== In popular culture ==
Rémy Martin can be found in the world of rap, especially in the United States. Fetty Wap has frequently mentioned the 1738 variety in his work.

Pete Townshend of rock band the Who wryly thanked Rémy Martin for saving his life "by making the bloody stuff so expensive" in the inner sleeve to his 1980 solo studio album Empty Glass. He also referred to the drink in the lyrics to his single "A Little Is Enough" by singing "I'm like a connoisseur of champagne cognac, the perfume nearly beats the taste." Townshend can also be seen drinking straight from a bottle of Rémy Martin in the music video to his song "Keep On Working".

Fellow Who member John Entwistle was also known for his love of the drink, and included the V.S.O.P. grading on the cover to his 1973 solo studio album Rigor Mortis Sets In. It is an inscription on an outdoor grave's footstone, which was either the front cover or the photo used on the inside of the gatefold depending on where the record was issued.

== See also ==
- Brandy
- Cognac
- Cognac (region)
