= Horseneck =

Horseneck or Horse's Neck may refer to:

- Horseneck, Pleasants County, West Virginia
- Horseneck, a former name for the Greenwich Avenue Historic District of Greenwich, Connecticut
- Horseneck Beach State Reservation, a public recreation area in Westport, Massachusetts
- Horseneck Tract, an area in Essex County, New Jersey
- Horse's neck, an American cocktail
- Horse's Neck (short story collection), a 1985 book by Pete Townshend

== See also ==
- Equine anatomy
