= Doug Sandom =

English drummer (1930–2019)

- Sandom performing with the Detours

Background information
- Born: Douglas Sandom; 26 February 1930; Greenford, Middlesex, England
- Died: 27 February 2019 (aged 89)
- Genres: Rock; pop
- Occupations: Bricklayer; musician
- Instrument: Drums
- Years active: 1962–1964

Douglas Sandom (26 February 1930 – 27 February 2019) was an English bricklayer who was the first drummer for the rock band the Who.

== Music career ==
During the infancy of the Who's career, while they were playing as the Detours (around mid-1962), Sandom, a bricklayer, joined as drummer. However, while the other members of the band were in their late teens, Sandom was in his early thirties, and the age difference caused problems within the band. Sandom's wife also objected to him staying out late into the night. In February 1964, the band discovered that there was another group called the Detours, so on Valentine's Day they changed their name to the Who.

When the band secured, but failed, an audition with Fontana Records in early 1964, the label's producer, Chris Parmeinter, expressed a dislike for Sandom's drumming. The band's then manager Helmut Gordon agreed, as did lead guitarist Pete Townshend. Townshend suggested to the other members, Roger Daltrey and John Entwistle, that Sandom leave the band. Sandom gave a month's notice and left in April.

Within a month of Sandom's departure, Keith Moon was hired after he approached the band at one of their gigs and told them he could play better than the session drummer they had hired to fill the vacancy left by Sandom. No recordings with Sandom playing with the band were ever released. On his departure from the group, Sandom said, "I wasn't so ambitious as the rest of them. I'd done it longer than what they had. Of course, I loved it. It was very nice to be part of a band that people followed; it was great. But I didn't get on well with Peter Townshend. I was a few years older than he was, and he thought I should pack it in more or less because of that. I thought I was doing all right with the band; we never got slung out of nowhere; we always passed our auditions." According to Townshend's book Who I Am (2012), Sandom was hurt by Townshend's comments that he should leave especially because a few months earlier, when the band failed an audition due to a record executive describing Pete Townshend as "gangly, noisy, and ugly", Sandom had himself defended Townshend against being ousted from the band, something that Townshend was not aware of at the time.

Sandom published his autobiography The Who Before the Who in 2014, to which Townshend contributed a foreword.

== Death ==
Sandom died on 27 February 2019, the day after his 89th birthday.
