= Empty Glass =

Studio album by Pete Townshend
- Released: 21 April 1980
- Recorded: November 1979 – February 1980
- Studios: Wessex Sound, London; Eel Pie, London; AIR, London
- Genres: Rock; new wave
- Length: 39:46
- Label: Atco
- Producer: Chris Thomas

Pete Townshend chronology
Rough Mix (1977)	Empty Glass (1980)	All the Best Cowboys Have Chinese Eyes (1982)

Singles from Empty Glass
- 1. "Rough Boys" Released: March 1980; 2. "Let My Love Open the Door" Released: June 1980; 3. "A Little Is Enough" Released: September 1980; 4. "Keep on Working" Released: 1980

Empty Glass is the third solo studio album by the English rock musician Pete Townshend, and his first composed of original material, released on 21 April 1980 by Atco Records.

The album deals with issues that Townshend was struggling with at the time, including alcoholism, drug abuse, marital problems and deceased friends, particularly Keith Moon, the Who's former drummer, who died in 1978. Empty Glass also contained the devotional love song, "Let My Love Open the Door", which became a Top 10 hit (#9) in the US, and the modestly successful singles "Rough Boys" (#89) and "A Little Is Enough" (#72). The album was rated No. 57 on Rolling Stone's list of the 100 greatest of the 1980s.

== History ==
In an interview with Murray Lerner on the film The Who: Live at the Isle of Wight, Townshend explained the album's title:

I called it Empty Glass, 'cause of this idea that when you go to the tavern – which is to God, you know – and you ask for His love – He's the bartender, you know – and He gives you a drink, and what you have to give Him is an empty glass. You know there's no point giving Him your heart if it's full already; there's no point going to God if your heart's full of Doris.

This concept was derived from the work of the Persian lyric poet Hafez, which Townshend became interested in from his involvement with Meher Baba, an Indian spiritual master who claimed he was an avatar – God in human form.

The album was written and recorded between 1978 and 1980, when activity with the Who had started to pick up again, and Townshend found himself having to write for both his solo project and his band. As a result, Empty Glass was considered superior to the Who's subsequent studio album Face Dances (1981), with critics calling it a Who album that never was.

The Who's lead vocalist Roger Daltrey later commented that he felt let down by Townshend, and that many of the songs from the album would have worked well for the Who, among them "Rough Boys" and "Empty Glass". Townshend countered by saying that "Rough Boys" was the one song Daltrey would have wanted clarified (in terms of the song's homoerotic subtext) and toned down were he to sing it, thus defeating its message, while "Empty Glass" had been recorded during sessions for Who Are You in 1978; a version featuring Keith Moon on drums and John Entwistle on bass appeared on the 1996 reissue of that album. This version is notable for suicidal undertones in the lyrics that were changed for Empty Glass: the line "Killing each other, then we jump off the ledge" became "Killing each other by driving a wedge".

The album was produced by Chris Thomas, whose credits included Pink Floyd's The Dark Side of the Moon and the Pretenders' debut studio album. "For a long time," Townshend said, "I wanted to work with Todd Rundgren, and I asked him to produce my solo album which he agreed to do. And then I suddenly realised it probably wasn't a good idea because we're so alike in a lot of ways. I would like to work with him. I think he's a better guitar player than me and a better singer but I think what really worried me about the prospect of him producing my solo album was that I'm influenced by him enough as it is. Do you understand? And I like the way I'm influenced by him at the moment."

== Writing and recording ==
Townshend began writing the songs and recording demos for Empty Glass in his 24-track home studio around late 1978, but recording sessions for the album would only begin in November 1979 at Wessex Studios in North London, with producer Chris Thomas at the helm, and Bill Price as the engineer. Additional recording was done at AIR Studios in Oxford Circus and Townshend's Eel Pie Studios from then until March 1980. Townshend performed all the guitar and synthesizer parts on the album, and brought in various musicians to lay down additional instrumentation. The album's line-up included Who touring keyboardist John Bundrick on piano and organ, Tony Butler on bass, Simon Phillips, Kenney Jones, Mark Brzezicki, and James Asher on drums, Peter Hope-Evans on harmonica, and Raphael Rudd, who arranged the horn parts on "Rough Boys".

== Cover artwork ==
The sleeve was designed by British-Irish photographer Bob Carlos Clarke. The album's title is an allusion to a poem by the Sufi lyric poet Hafez, and at one point the album had the working title of "Sacred Animal".

The sleeve of the vinyl album (SD 32–100) includes this dedication:

This album is dedicated to my wife Karen.
"Rough Boys" is dedicated to my children Emma and Minta and to the Sex Pistols.
Finally thanks to Remy Martin Cognac for saving my life by making the bloody stuff so expensive.

== Critical reception ==
Professional ratings
Review scores
Source	Rating
AllMusic	4.5/5 stars
Christgau's Record Guide	B−
The Encyclopedia of Popular Music	3/5 stars
Mojo	4/5 stars
PopMatters	7/10
Record Collector	4/5 stars
The Rolling Stone Album Guide	3/5 stars
Smash Hits	7/10

Billboard described Empty Glass as "impressive album that showcases perhaps above all, Townshend's incredible versatility on guitar with each riveting riff rising to the forefront." The reviewer conclude that "the production, along with Townshend's impeccable timing, delivery and rhythmic sense gives the album an urgent and contemporary flavor, and an indication of what rock'n'roll should be."

In a review of a remastered release for PopMatters, John Bergstrom said that it had "dated poorly" in terms of arrangement and production but "ultimately, Townshend's songwriting makes the best of Empty Glass more than worthwhile."

== Track listing ==
All tracks are written by Pete Townshend.

Side one
No.	Title	Length
1.	"Rough Boys"	4:02
2.	"I Am an Animal"	3:51
3.	"And I Moved"	3:21
4.	"Let My Love Open the Door"	2:44
5.	"Jools and Jim"	2:36

Side two
No.	Title	Length
6.	"Keep On Working"	3:23
7.	"Cat's in the Cupboard"	3:34
8.	"A Little Is Enough"	4:42
9.	"Empty Glass"	5:25
10.	"Gonna Get Ya"	6:25
Total length:		39:46

Bonus tracks (Included only on the 2006 Hip-O US and Imperial Japan CD Release)
No.	Title	Length
11.	"I Am an Animal" (Demo alternate vocal version)	3:48
12.	"Keep on Working" (Demo alternate vocal version)	3:32
13.	"And I Moved" (Demo alternate vocal version)	3:06
14.	"I'm Gonna Get Ya" (Work in progress long version)	11:24

== Non-album tracks ==
Song	Single	Notes
"Greyhound Girl"	"Let My Love Open the Door"	song originally written for Lifehouse

== Personnel ==
Credits are adapted from the Empty Glass liner notes.

Musicians

- Pete Townshend – vocals; piano; guitars; synthesizers
- John "Rabbit" Bundrick – "straight" keyboards, backing vocals
- Tony Butler – bass guitar, backing vocals (tracks 1, 2, 4, 5, 7–10)
- Simon Phillips – drums (tracks 2–4, 7, 9, 10)
- James Asher – drums (tracks 5, 6)
- Kenney Jones – drums (track 1)
- Mark Brzezicki – drums (track 8)
- Peter Hope-Evans – harmonica (track 7)

Technical

- Chris Thomas – producer
- Bill Price – engineer
- Steve Nye – additional engineer
- Ted Jensen – mastering engineer
- Raphael Rudd – brass arrangements on "Rough Boys"

Artwork

- Bob Carlos Clarke – sleeve design and photography
- Richard Evans – graphic design and back cover illustration

== Charts ==
=== Weekly charts ===
Weekly chart performance for Empty Glass
Chart (1980)	Peak position
Australian Albums (Kent Music Report)	28
Canada Top Albums/CDs (RPM)	2
New Zealand Albums (RMNZ)	21
Norwegian Albums (VG-lista)	40
UK Albums (Official Charts)	11
US Billboard 200	5
US AOR (Radio & Records)	1

=== Year-end charts ===
1980 year-end chart performance for Empty Glass
Chart (1980)	Position
New Zealand Albums (RMNZ)	48
US Billboard 200	60

== Certifications ==
Region	Certification	Certified units/sales
Canada (Music Canada)	Platinum	100,000^{^}
United Kingdom (BPI)	Silver	60,000^{^}
United States (RIAA)	Platinum	1,000,000^{^}
^{^} Shipments figures based on certification alone.
