= A Little Is Enough =

Single by Pete Townshend

from the album Empty Glass
- B-side: "Cat's in the Cupboard"
- Released: September 1980
- Recorded: 1980
- Genre: Rock
- Length: 4:42 (Album version); 3:10 (7" version)
- Label: Atco
- Songwriter: Pete Townshend
- Producers: Pete Townshend; Chris Thomas

Pete Townshend US singles chronology
"Let My Love Open the Door" (1980)	"A Little Is Enough" (1980)	"Keep On Working" (1980)

Official audio
- "A Little Is Enough" on YouTube

"A Little Is Enough" is a single written and performed by the English rock musician Pete Townshend, also known for being the guitarist for the Who. The track appeared on his third solo studio album, Empty Glass (1980).

== Background ==
Pete Townshend pledged that "A Little Is Enough" was meant to make the best of his fitful marriage with his wife, Karen. "I was able to very easily put into words something that had actually happened to me when I was a thirty-four-year-old," he said. "It's very emotional, but it's also very straightforward and clear."

Townshend has also said that the song was inspired by an encounter with his spiritual guru, Meher Baba's, secretary, Adi Irani.

Meher Baba's secretary Adi Irani made a visit to London around this time, I tried to get his advice. 'My wife doesn't love me anymore,' I said.'What should I do?' 'She doesn't love you at all?' he wobbled his head as he spoke. 'She said she loved me a little.' 'Ah!' Adi clapped his hands and smiled. 'A little! That's good. Love is universal. Limitless. So even a little is enough.' I wrote a song called 'A Little Is Enough', and recorded it using the same system as I'd used on "Let My Love Open The Door". Although I'd always thought my love songs were terrible, I think this is one of the best songs I've ever written.

— Pete Townshend

Pete Townshend also said that he preferred "A Little Is Enough" to his US top nine hit "Let My Love Open the Door" by saying that "Let My Love Open the Door" was just a "ditty".

The song also makes a reference to Rémy Martin in the lyrics "I'm like a connoisseur of champagne cognac, the perfume nearly beats the taste."

== Release and critical reception ==
"A Little is Enough" was released on Townshend's third solo studio album Empty Glass (1980), where it was the eighth track on the album. The track was then released as the second US single from said album, where it was backed with "Cat's in the Cupboard" (also from Empty Glass). The single was modestly successful, hitting No. 72. It was followed up by "Rough Boys" in America. The single wasn't released in Britain, where another single from Empty Glass, "Keep On Working" was issued instead.

Record World called it a "stunning triumph" and said that "the vocal urgency is awesome." "A Little Is Enough" was cited as a highlight from Empty Glass by AllMusic's Stephen Thomas Erlewine.

== Chart performance ==
=== Weekly charts ===
Chart (1980)	Peak position
US Billboard Hot 100	72
