= Richard Barnes (author) =

English author

Richard Alan Barnes (born 3 October 1944) is an English author, best known for his association with the mod subculture and the rock group the Who, including his book on the group Maximum R&B. He gave the Who their name when he was roommates with Pete Townshend, after the group had originally been called The Detours.

== The Who ==
Barnes started a course at Ealing Art College at the same time as Townshend and the two of them shared a flat together, bonding over their mutual love for R&B and soul records. Townshend subsequently said that Barnes was "very important to The Who's thinking process in the early days. He and I used to sit around and talk about The Who as an installation, we wrote a manifesto for the group together." When Townshend's group, The Detours, needed a new name, the pair sat up all night suggesting joke names, until Barnes came up with the Who. The group's singer, Roger Daltrey endorsed the new name the next day.

In early 1964, Barnes was working as a promoter for the Railway Hotel, Wealdstone. He removed all the lights in the pub apart from two pink ones, and turned up the heating to create a sweaty atmosphere. He managed to achieve average audience attendances of between 500 - 1000, including a weekly residency by the Who every Tuesday. Barnes believed the Who should have split up around the mid-1970s, and believes the only reason they stayed together was for the money.

In 1977, Barnes & Townshend collaborated on a book to coincide with the Ken Russell film of the Who's rock-opera Tommy, entitled The Story Of Tommy.

1982 saw the first publication of The Who: Maximum R & B, an officially authorised biography of the band with photographs. After multiple pressings, the book is still in print.

In 1993 Barnes was listed as director and collaborator on Townshend's "Psychoderelict solo album and theatrical American solo-tour that followed. Barnes was featured in the official and definitive documentary of the group: Amazing Journey - The Story Of The Who, directed by Murray Lerner and given a 2007 worldwide theatrical release.

Barnes was featured in the 2013 documentary on the making of the band's 1973 Quadrophenia album: Quadrophenia: Can You See the Real Me, as well as many other documentaries focussed on the band's and also specifically the members Pete Townshend and Keith Moon.

== Mod culture ==
In 1979 Barnes wrote and compiled the book Mods!, in which he described the mod movement with particular emphasis in London.

== Other work ==
Barnes as a journalist worked as an art director on The Daily Mirror in the early 1970s and has contributes to a wide number of UK music magazines to this day. He has appeared in many television and film documentaries speaking about subjects pertaining to Mods, the Who and its members or the London of the 1960s in general.

== Bibliography ==
- Atkins, John (2000). The Who on Record: A Critical History, 1963-1998. McFarland. ISBN 978-0-78640-609-8.
- Marsh, Dave (1983). Before I Get Old: The Story of The Who. Plexus Publishing Ltd. ISBN 978-0-85965-083-0.
- Townshend, Pete (2012). Who I Am. HarperCollins. ISBN 978-0-06212-724-2.
