= Horse's Neck (short story collection) =

Collection of short stories by Pete Townshend

- First edition
- Author: Pete Townshend
- Language: English
- Publication date: 1985

Horse's Neck is a collection of short stories written by the English musician and songwriter Pete Townshend between 1979 and 1984. It was first published in 1985 by Faber & Faber.

== Reviews ==
Although the stories might be considered semi-autobiographical, Townshend wrote in the preface: "I have never wanted simply to tell my own story. But I have tried here to attend to a wide range of feelings . . . aspects of my struggle to discover what beauty really is."

Reviewer Susan Avallone wrote that the collection of stories was "intriguing experimental writing" and "a strange and compelling collection of poetry and prose," uncovering "family, friends, ambition, addiction, infidelity, obsession, and life on the road." A theme provided by references to horses appeared to be "part obsession and part allegory." She especially pointed out "Champagne on the Terraces" as "a haunting insight into alcoholism and family life."

Kristine McKenna at Spin said, "A thinly disguised autobiography incorporating episodes of surreal fantasy, Horse's Neck sorts through childhood memories and the rubble of an occasionally debauched past."

== Contents ==
Along with the preface written by Townshend, the book contains the following stories:

- "Thirteen"
- "Horses"
- "The Pact"
- "Champagne on the Terraces"
- "Ropes"
- "Tonight's the Night"
- "Fish Shop"
- "Pancho and the Baron"
- "Winston"
- "A Death in the Day Of"
- "The Plate"
- "Laguna: Valentine's Day 1982"
