= Who I Am (book) =

2012 memoir by Pete Townshend

- First hardback edition cover
- Author: Pete Townshend
- Genre: Memoir
- Published: 2012 (HarperCollins)
- Media type: Book, e-book, audio CD
- Pages: 544
- ISBN: 978-0062127242

Who I Am is a memoir by rock guitarist and composer Pete Townshend of the Who. It was published by HarperCollins in October 2012 in both book and e-book format, plus an unabridged 15-CD audiobook read by Townshend. The book chronicles Townshend's upbringing in London, the formation and evolution of the Who, and his struggles with rock stardom and drugs and alcohol. The title is a play on words, referring to the Who's hit single, "Who Are You" as well as the album of the same name.

Who I Am entered The New York Times best seller list at No. 3 in October 2012. It received mixed reviews from critics, with some admiring its frankness and intimacy, and others complaining about its editing and being too dull.

== Background ==
Pete Townshend signed a contract with Little, Brown and Company in May 1996 to write his autobiography, but abandoned it two years later, when, according to Townshend, "I found it too hard". He published small extracts of what he had written on a blog. He later signed a deal with HarperCollins, and the memoir, originally entitled Peter Townshend: Who He?, was published in October 2012 as Who I Am. Townshend said he preferred the original Who He title: "Who I Am seems so final, so grandiose, so....Pete Townshend. It's just too perfect." The original manuscript Townshend presented to HarperCollins was 1,000 pages long, but the publisher cut it back to 500 pages.

== Synopsis ==
Pete Townshend's memoir begins with his upbringing in London after World War II (he was born in May 1945, the month the war in Europe ended). Included is the period he lived with his unstable grandmother, during which time he reports fragmentary memories of sexual abuse at the hands of her suitors. Townshend discusses the Mod scene of the 1960s, the effect the war had on his generation, and the development of rock music. He also discusses the effect his childhood had on his music, particularly the rock opera Tommy.

The book traces the formation and evolution of the Who, and includes details of their appearance at Woodstock in 1969 and their storied trashing of hotels. Townshend calls Roger Daltrey "the unquestionable leader" of the band. He says he started smashing his guitars at the end of performances after he accidentally pushed one through a club ceiling in 1964 and damaged it. His "windmill" style of striking guitar chords was adopted from Keith Richards, whom Townshend says he once saw swinging his arm to warm up before going on stage.

The book also includes the many encounters Townshend had with other rock musicians, including Jimi Hendrix, whom he called a shaman because of the way he played his guitar. Townshend says that in a way Hendrix's "performances did borrow from mine – the feedback, the distortion, the guitar theatrics," but he added that Hendrix's "artistic genius lay in how he created a sound all his own". Townshend recalls that at the 1967 Monterey Pop Festival the Who and Hendrix argued backstage as to who would play first, and Townshend won after a coin flip.

Townshend describes himself in the book as "probably bisexual" because of a brief affair he had with journalist Danny Fields and his interest in Mick Jagger, saying "Mick is the only man I've ever seriously wanted to fuck". Keith Moon and John Entwistle felt that Townshend was too prudish around groupies and once paid one $100 to infect him with gonorrhea. Townshend says he tried to distance himself from rock stardom as much as possible. He studied the works of Indian spiritual master and mystic Meher Baba, and while he was able to avoid drugs and extramarital sex most of the time, Townshend says he periodically lapsed and indulged in cocaine and alcohol.

The book details Townshend's work as an editor at London publisher Faber and Faber, some of the literary personalities he worked with, and some of the books he commissioned. It also covers his charity work in rehabilitation programs and establishing a shelter for battered wives. In 2003 Townshend was arrested for allegedly downloading child pornography. In the book he claims that he accessed the images as research for a campaign against the presence of such images, and was helping to set up "a research program for a new support system for survivors of childhood abuse". He was later given a formal police caution. Townshend wrote that he had accepted the caution only because "I was in no frame of mind to live through another eternity – this time in court", although he later wished he had gone to trial to prove his innocence.

== Reception ==
Music journalist Rob Sheffield writing in Rolling Stone called Who I Am "intensely intimate" and "candid to the point of self-lacerating". He said Townshend seems to want to deflate his rock-star image by exposing his "defects and contradictions: the 'Angry Yobbo' guitar hooligan he plays onstage versus the introspective composer, the spiritual seeker versus the hedonistic drug addict". The Guardian said that while many rock memoirs "run out of gas once the classic songs dry up and the major crises have been overcome", Townshend's life "was never dull". It said Townshend's prose is "crisp, clear and unflinching", and called the book "unusually frank and moving".

Literary critic Michiko Kakutani writing in The New York Times said Who I Am "is an earnest, tortured, searching book", and was impressed with the way Townshend documented how the Who "articulate[d] the joy and rage" of post-World War II Britain's "teenage wasteland" generation. But Kakutani felt that the book's editing was uneven, resulting in too much detail in some sections, and "jump cuts" in other areas that "chop the narrative into herky-jerky pieces and slow the book's momentum". The A.V. Club said Townshend's accounts of the making of albums like Who's Next and Quadrophenia are "breathtaking", but complained that "there are glaring gaps and dead ends in his story. Daltrey, Moon, and Entwistle are shunted to the background, leaving the alchemy of their unique collaboration mostly in the dark". It felt that "Townshend's intellectual tone sucks up too much of the emotional oxygen".

British journalist Simon Garfield in a review in The Observer complained that the book is too "well-behaved and ordered" and lacks the exuberance of Keith Richards's "indulgent memoir", Life. He said Who I Am is "insightful about the creative process", and is "a worthwhile, comprehensive and culturally valuable account of a life", but "it didn't leave me with the sense of elation I normally feel after brushes with the Who". Rock music critic Robert Christgau said in The New York Times that while he was impressed by Townshend's literary career, he tries to cram too much into the book, leaving little room to make the text "come alive". American author Louis Bayard said in The Washington Post that he expected more out of Who I Am from such an "articulate" person as Townshend. He said that the "pretentiousness" and the "endless [...] therapy" that pervades the book "makes you long for the angry yobbo who clobbered Abbie Hoffman at Woodstock, [and] got kicked out of every Holiday Inn in the world".

== Works cited ==
- Townshend, Pete (2012). Who I Am. HarperCollins. ISBN 978-0-00-746604-7.
