= Pete Townshend =

English musician and songwriter (born 1945)

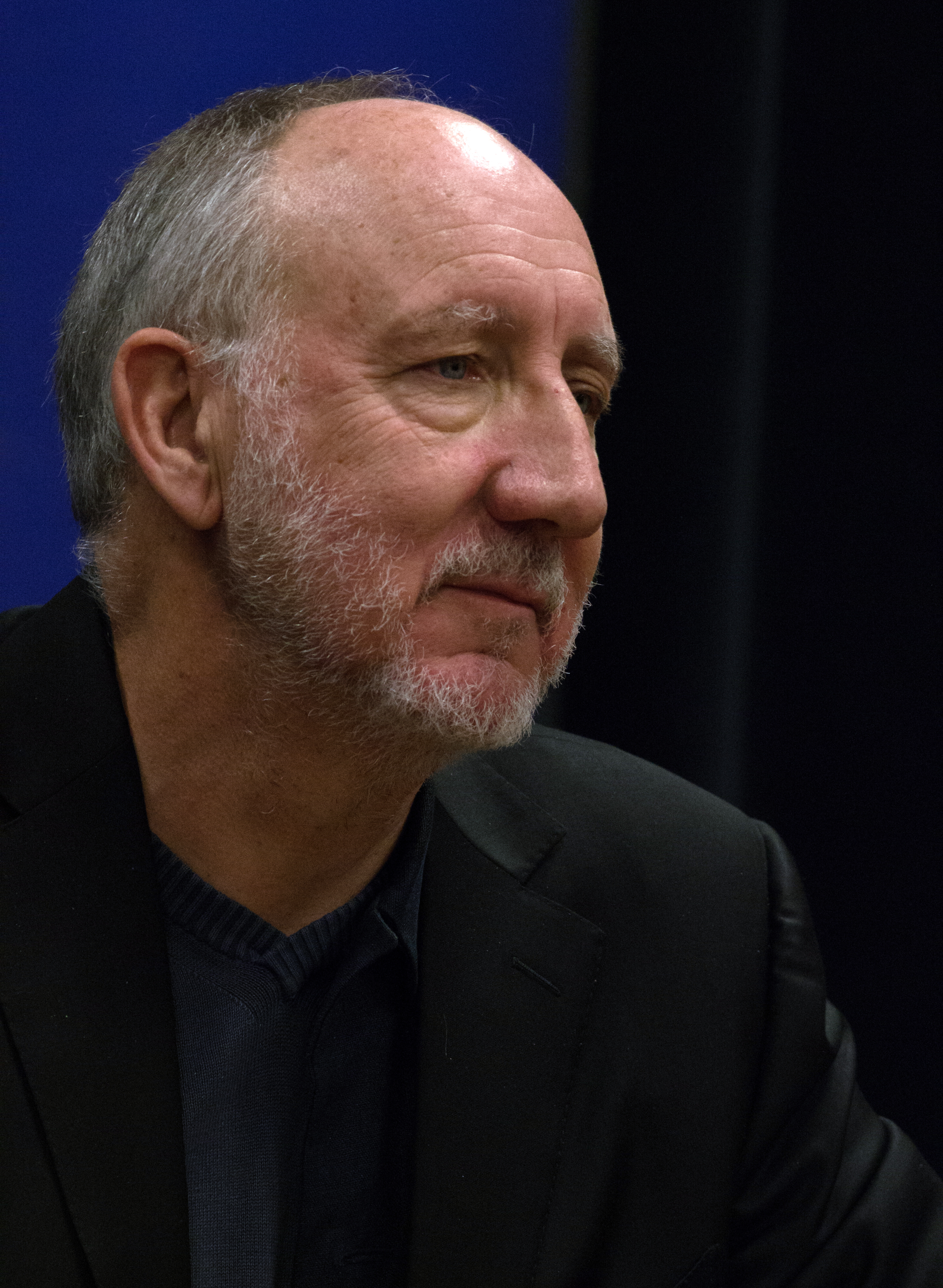
- Townshend in 2012

Background information
- Also known as: Bijou Drains
- Born: Peter Dennis Blandford Townshend; 19 May 1945 (age 81); Chiswick, Middlesex, England
- Origin: London, England
- Genres: Rock; art rock; hard rock; power pop; jazz
- Occupations: Musician; songwriter; author
- Instruments: Guitar; vocals; keyboards
- Works: Solo; with the Who
- Years active: 1962–present
- Labels: Track; Polydor; Atlantic; Atco; Decca; Rykodisc; Warner Bros.
- Member of: The Who
- Formerly of: Deep End
- Spouses: Karen Astley (m. 1968; sep. 1994) Rachel Fuller (m. 2016)
- Website: thewho.com
- Pete Townshend's voice from the BBC programme Front Row, 26 December 2012

Peter Dennis Blandford Townshend (/ˈtaʊnzənd/; born 19 May 1945) is an English musician and songwriter. He is the co-founder, guitarist, keyboardist, second lead vocalist, and principal songwriter of the Who, one of the most influential rock bands of the 1960s and 1970s. His aggressive playing style, poetic songwriting techniques and authorship of two rock operas with the Who, as well as other projects, have earned him critical acclaim.

Townshend has written more than 100 songs for 12 of the Who's studio albums. These include concept albums, the rock operas Tommy (1969) and Quadrophenia (1973), plus popular rock radio staples such as Who's Next (1971); as well as dozens more that appeared as non-album singles, bonus tracks on reissues, and tracks on rarities compilation albums such as Odds & Sods (1974). He has also written more than 100 songs that have appeared on his solo albums, as well as radio jingles and television theme songs.

While known primarily as a guitarist, Townshend also plays keyboards, banjo, accordion, harmonica, ukulele, mandolin, violin, synthesiser, bass guitar, and drums; he is self-taught on all of these instruments and plays on his own solo albums, several Who albums, and as a guest contributor to an array of other artists' recordings. Townshend has also contributed to and authored many newspaper and magazine articles, book reviews, essays, books, and scripts, and he has collaborated as a lyricist and composer for many other musical acts.

In 1983, Townshend received the Brit Award for Lifetime Achievement and in 1990 he was inducted into the Rock and Roll Hall of Fame as a member of the Who. Townshend was ranked No. 3 in Dave Marsh's 1994 list of Best Guitarists in The New Book of Rock Lists. In 2001, he received a Grammy Lifetime Achievement Award as a member of the Who; and in 2008 he received Kennedy Center Honors. He was ranked No. 10 in Gibson.com's 2011 list of the top 50 guitarists, and No. 37 on Rolling Stone's 2023 list of 250 greatest guitarists of all time. He and Roger Daltrey received The George and Ira Gershwin Award for Lifetime Musical Achievement at UCLA on 21 May 2016.

== Early life and education ==
Townshend was born in Chiswick, West London, at the Chiswick Hospital, Netheravon Road, in England. He came from a musical family: his father, Cliff Townshend, was a professional alto saxophonist in the Royal Air Force's dance band the Squadronaires and his mother, Betty (née Dennis), was a singer with the Sidney Torch and Les Douglass Orchestras.

The Townshends had a volatile marriage. Both drank heavily and had fiery tempers. Cliff Townshend was often away from his family touring with his band while Betty carried on affairs with other men. The two split when Townshend was a toddler and he was sent to live with his maternal grandmother Emma Dennis, whom Pete later described as "clinically insane", later citing this experience as having unknowingly influenced the plot of Tommy. The two-year separation ended when Cliff and Betty purchased a house together on Woodgrange Avenue in Acton, and the young Pete was happily reunited with his parents. His neighbourhood was one-third Polish, and a devout Jewish family upstairs shared their housing with them and cooking with them — many of his father's closest friends were Jewish.

Townshend says he did not have many friends growing up, so he spent much of his boyhood reading adventure novels like Gulliver's Travels and Treasure Island. He enjoyed his family's frequent excursions to the seaside and the Isle of Man. It was on one of these trips in the summer of 1956 that he repeatedly watched the 1956 film Rock Around the Clock, sparking his fascination with American rock and roll.

Not long thereafter, he went to see Bill Haley perform in London, Townshend's first concert. At the time, he did not see himself pursuing a career as a professional musician; instead, he wanted to become a journalist.

Upon passing the eleven-plus exam, Townshend was enrolled at Acton County Grammar School. At Acton County, he was frequently bullied because he had a large nose, an experience that profoundly affected him. His grandmother Emma purchased his first guitar for Christmas in 1956, an inexpensive Spanish model. Though his father taught him a couple of chords, Townshend was largely self-taught on the instrument and never learned to read music. Townshend and school friend John Entwistle formed a short-lived trad jazz group, the Confederates, featuring Townshend on banjo and Entwistle on horns. The Confederates played gigs at the Congo Club, a youth club run by the Acton Congregational Church, and covered Acker Bilk, Kenny Ball, and Lonnie Donegan. However, both became influenced by the increasing popularity of rock 'n' roll, with Townshend particularly admiring Cliff Richard's debut single, "Move It". Townshend left the Confederates after getting into a fight with the group's drummer, Chris Sherwin, and purchased a "reasonably good Czechoslovakian guitar" at his mother's antique shop.

Townshend's brothers Paul and Simon were born in 1957 and 1960, respectively. Lacking the requisite grades to attend university, Townshend was faced with the choice of art school, music school, or getting a job. He ultimately chose to study graphic design at Ealing Art College, enrolling in 1961. At Ealing, Townshend studied alongside future Rolling Stones guitarist Ronnie Wood. Townshend dropped out in 1964 to focus on music full-time.

== Musical career ==
=== 1962–1964: The Detours ===
In 1961, Entwistle joined the Detours, a skiffle/rock and roll band formed by Roger Daltrey. The following year, he suggested to Daltrey that Townshend join as lead guitarist. Their lineup coalesced around Daltrey on rhythm guitar, Townshend on lead guitar, Entwistle on bass, Doug Sandom on drums, and Colin Dawson as vocalist. Daltrey was the leader of the group and, according to Townshend, "ran things the way he wanted them". In the early days of the Detours, the band's repertoire consisted of instrumentals by the Shadows and the Ventures, as well as traditional pop and jazz covers.

Townshend, with Entwistle's encouragement, became the sole guitarist in 1963 after Daltrey moved to vocals. Through Townshend's mother, the group obtained a management contract with local promoter Robert Druce, who started booking the band as a support act for bands including Screaming Lord Sutch, Cliff Bennett and the Rebel Rousers, Shane Fenton and the Fentones, and Johnny Kidd and the Pirates. In 1963, Townshend's father arranged an amateur recording of "It Was You", the first song his son ever wrote. The Detours became aware of a group of the same name in February 1964, forcing them to change their name. Townshend's roommate Richard Barnes came up with "The Who", and Daltrey decided it was the best choice.

=== 1964–1982: The Who ===
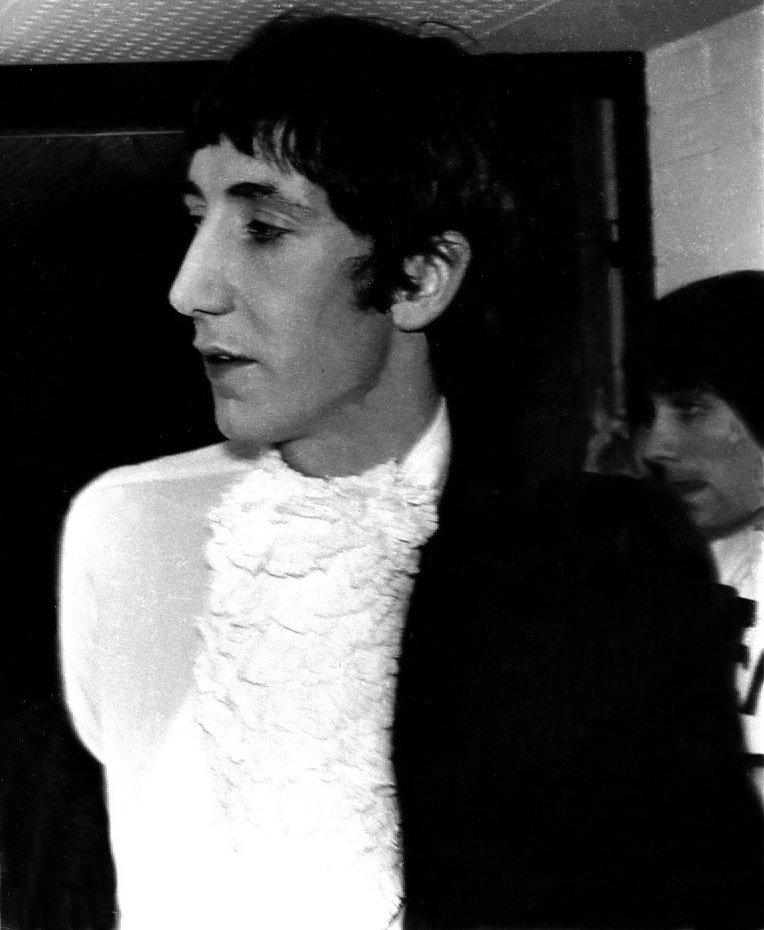
Townshend (with Moon, rear right) backstage before a gig at Friedrich-Ebert-Halle in Ludwigshafen, Germany on 12 April 1967

Not long after the name change, drummer Doug Sandom was replaced by Keith Moon, who had been drumming semi-professionally with the Beachcombers for several years. The band was soon taken on by a mod publicist named Peter Meaden who convinced them to change their name to the High Numbers to give the band more of a mod feel. After bringing out one failed single ("I'm the Face"/"Zoot Suit"), they dropped Meaden and were signed by two new managers, Chris Stamp and Kit Lambert, who had paired up with the intention of finding new talent and creating a documentary about them. The band wanted a name that all felt represented the band best, and dropped the High Numbers name, reverting to the Who. In June 1964, during a performance at the Railway Tavern, Townshend accidentally broke the top of his guitar on the low ceiling and proceeded to destroy the entire instrument. The on-stage destruction of instruments soon became a regular part of the Who's live shows.

With the assistance of Lambert, the Who caught the ear of American record producer Shel Talmy, who had the band signed to a recording contract. Townshend wrote a song, "I Can't Explain", as a deliberate sound-alike of the Kinks, another group Talmy produced. Released as a single in January 1965, "I Can't Explain" was the Who's first hit, reaching number eight on the British charts. A follow-up single, "Anyway, Anyhow, Anywhere", credited to both Townshend and Daltrey, also reached the top 10 in the UK. However, it was the release of the Who's third single, "My Generation", in November that, according to Who biographer Mark Wilkerson, "cemented their reputation as a hard-nosed band who reflected the feelings of thousands of pissed-off adolescents at the time." The Townshend-penned single reached number two on the UK charts, becoming the Who's biggest hit. The song and its famous line "I hope I die before I get old" was "very much about trying to find a place in society", Townshend stated in an interview with David Fricke.

To capitalise on their recent single success, the Who's debut album, My Generation (The Who Sings My Generation in the US), was released in late 1965, containing original material written by Townshend and several James Brown covers that Daltrey favoured. Townshend continued to write several successful singles for the band, including "Pictures of Lily", "Substitute", "I'm a Boy", and "Happy Jack". Lambert encouraged Townshend to write longer pieces of music for the next album, which became "A Quick One, While He's Away". The album was subsequently titled A Quick One and reached No. 4 in the charts upon its release in December 1966. In their stage shows, Townshend developed a guitar stunt in which he would swing his right arm against the guitar strings in a style reminiscent of the vanes of a windmill. He developed this style after watching Rolling Stones guitarist Keith Richards warm up before a show.

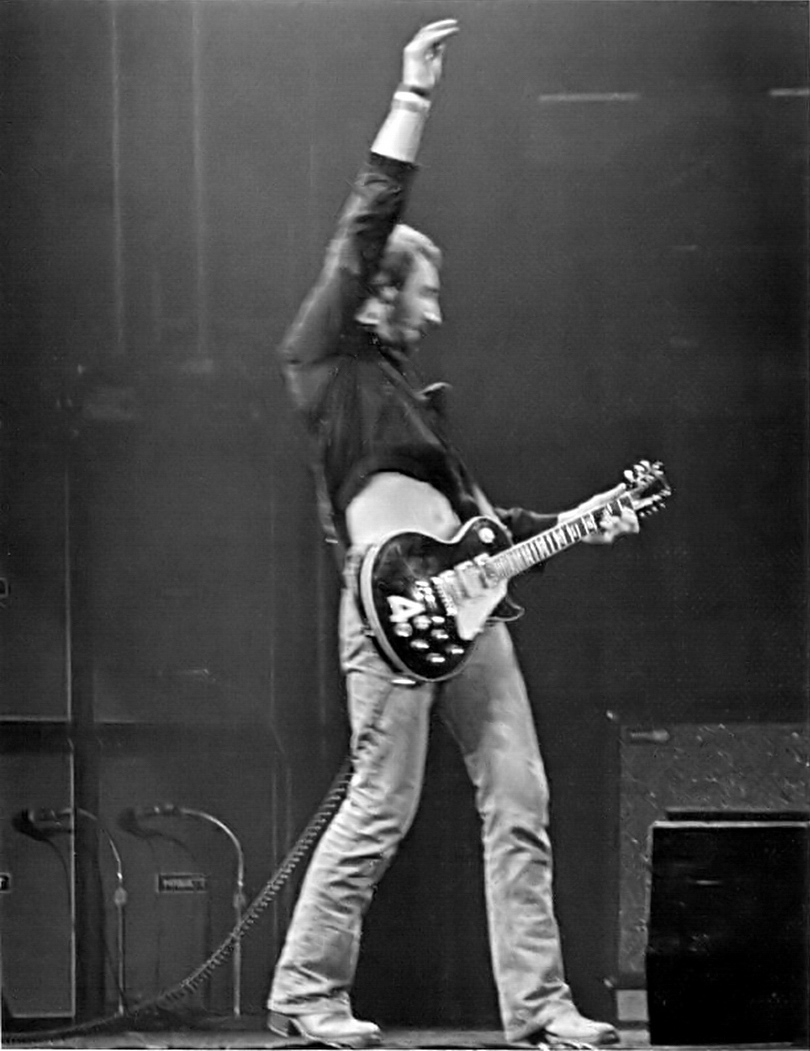
Townshend's "windmill" technique

The Who commenced their first US tour on 22 March 1967. Townshend took to trashing his hotel suites, though not to the extent of his bandmate Moon. He also began experimenting with LSD, though stopped taking the drug after receiving a potent hit after the Monterey Pop Festival on 18 June. Released in December, their next album was The Who Sell Out—a concept album based on pirate radio, which had been instrumental in raising the Who's popularity. It included several humorous jingles and mock commercials between songs, and the Who's biggest US single, "I Can See for Miles". Despite the success of "I Can See for Miles", which reached No. 9 on the American charts, Townshend was surprised it was not an even bigger hit, as he considered it the best song he had written up to that point.

By 1968, Townshend became interested in the teachings of Meher Baba. He began to develop a musical piece about a deaf, dumb, and blind boy who would experience sensations musically. The piece would explore the tenets of Baba's philosophy. The result was the rock opera Tommy, released on 23 May 1969 to critical and commercial success. In support of Tommy, the Who launched a tour that included a memorable appearance at the Woodstock Festival on 17 August. While the Who were playing, Yippie leader Abbie Hoffman jumped the stage to complain about the arrest of John Sinclair. Townshend promptly knocked him offstage with his guitar, shouting, "Fuck off my fucking stage!"

In 1970, the Who released Live at Leeds, which several music critics cite as the best live album of all time. Townshend began writing material for another rock opera. Dubbed Lifehouse, it was designed to be a multi-media project that symbolised the relationship between a musician and his audience. The rest of the band were confused by its convoluted plot and simply wanted another album. Townshend began to feel alienated, and the project was abandoned after he suffered a nervous breakdown. Much of the material intended for Lifehouse was released as a traditional studio album, Who's Next. It became a commercial smash, reaching number one in the UK, and spawned two successful hit singles, "Baba O'Riley" and "Won't Get Fooled Again", that featured pioneering use of the synthesizer. "Baba O'Riley" in particular was written as Townshend's ode to his two heroes at the time, Meher Baba and composer Terry Riley.

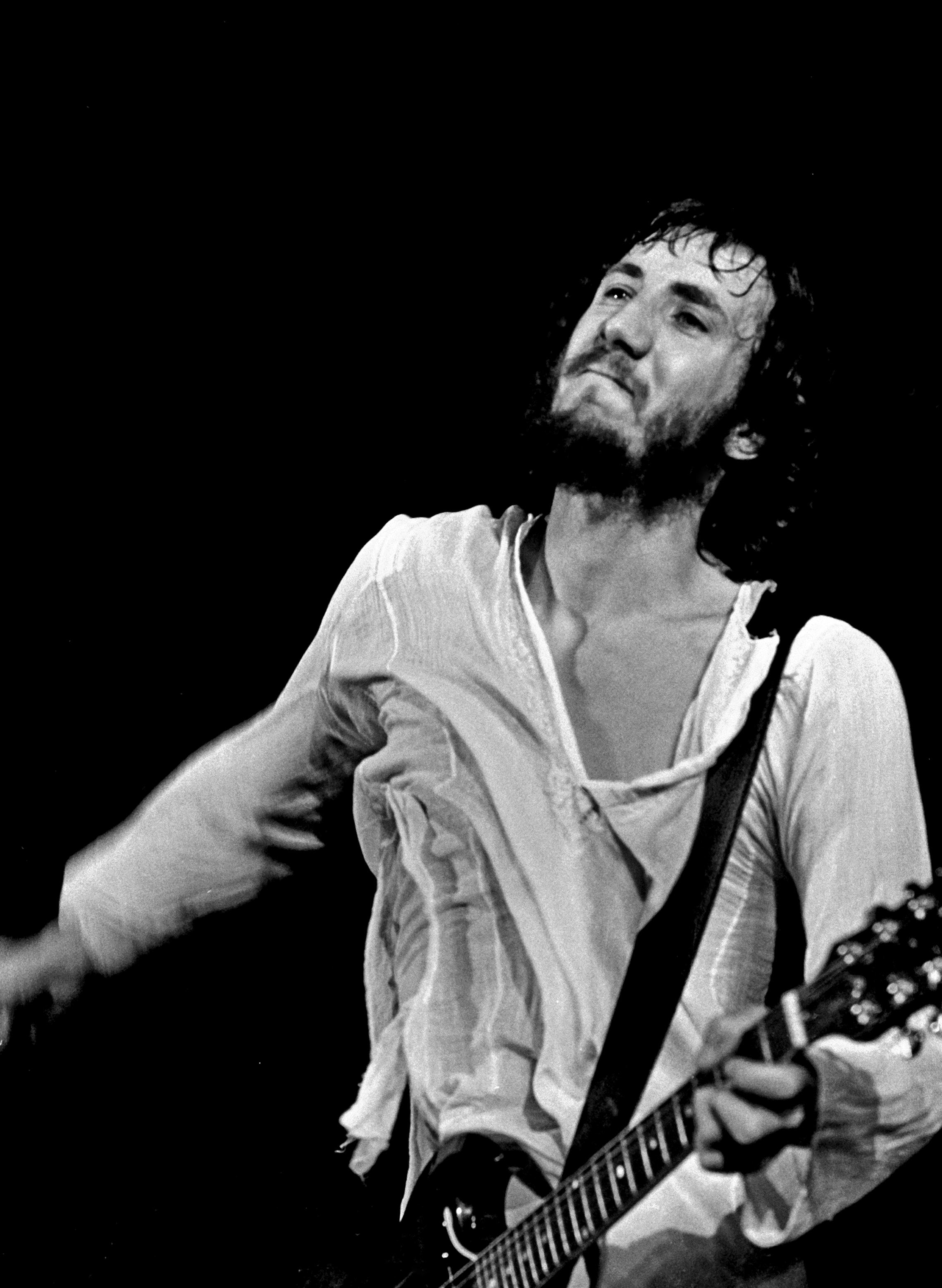
Townshend performing in Hamburg, Germany in August 1972

Townshend began writing songs for another rock opera in 1973. He decided it would explore the mod subculture and its clashes with rockers in the early 1960s in the UK. Entitled Quadrophenia, it was the only Who album written entirely by Townshend, and he produced the album as well due to the souring of relations with Lambert. It was released in November, and became their highest charting cross-Atlantic success, reaching No. 2 in the UK and US. NME reviewer Charles Shaar Murray called it "prime cut Who" and "the most rewarding musical experience of the year." On tour, the band played the album along to pre-recorded backing tapes, causing much friction. The tapes malfunctioned during a performance in Newcastle, prompting Townshend to drag soundman Bob Pridden onstage, scream at him and kick over all the amplifiers, partially destroying the malfunctioning tapes. On 14 April 1974, Townshend played his first solo concert, a benefit to raise funds for a London community centre.

A film version of Tommy was directed by Ken Russell, and starred Roger Daltrey in the title role, Ann-Margret as his mother, and Oliver Reed as his step-father, with cameos by Tina Turner, Elton John, Eric Clapton, and other rock notables; the film premiered on 18 March 1975. Townshend was nominated for an Academy Award for scoring and adapting the music in the film. The Who by Numbers came out in November of that year and peaked at No. 7 in the UK and 8 in the US. It featured introspective songs, often with a negative slant. The album spawned one hit single, "Squeeze Box", that was written after Townshend learned how to play the accordion. After a 1976 tour, Townshend took a year-long break from the band to focus on spending time with his family.

The Who continues despite the deaths of two of the original members (Keith Moon in 1978 and John Entwistle in 2002). The band is regarded by many rock critics as one of the best live bands from the 1960s to the 2000s. The Who continues to perform critically acclaimed sets into the 21st century, including highly regarded performances at The Concert for New York City in 2001, the 2004 Isle of Wight Festival, Live 8 in 2005, and the 2007 and 2015 Glastonbury Festival.

Townshend remained the primary songwriter and leader of the group, writing over 100 songs which appeared on the band's twelve studio albums. Among his creations is the rock opera Quadrophenia. Townshend revisited album-length storytelling throughout his career and remains associated with the rock opera form. Many studio recordings also feature Townshend on piano or keyboards, though keyboard-heavy tracks increasingly featured guest artists in the studio, such as Nicky Hopkins, John ”Rabbit” Bundrick, or Chris Stainton.

Townshend is one of the key figures in the development of feedback in rock guitar. When asked who first used feedback, Deep Purple guitarist Ritchie Blackmore said:

Pete Townshend was definitely the first. But not being that good a guitarist, he used to just sort of crash chords and let the guitar feedback. He didn't get into twiddling with the dials on the amplifier until much later. He's overrated in England, but at the same time you find a lot of people like Jeff Beck and Hendrix getting credit for things he started. Townshend was the first to break his guitar, and he was the first to do a lot of things. He's very good at his chord scene, too.

Similarly, when Jimmy Page was asked about the development of guitar feedback, he said:

I don't know who really did feedback first; it just sort of happened. I don't think anybody consciously nicked it from anybody else. It was just going on. But Pete Townshend obviously was the one, through the music of his group, who made the use of feedback more his style, and so it's related to him. Whereas the other players like Jeff Beck and myself were playing more single note things than chords.

Many rock guitarists have cited Townshend as an influence, among them Slash, Alex Lifeson, and Steve Jones.

=== 1972–present: Solo career ===
In addition to his work with the Who, Townshend has been sporadically active as a solo recording artist. Between 1969 and 1971 Townshend, along with other devotees to Meher Baba, recorded a trio of albums devoted to his teachings: Happy Birthday, I Am, and With Love. In response to bootlegging of these, he compiled his personal highlights (and "Evolution", a collaboration with Ronnie Lane), and released his first major-label solo title, 1972's Who Came First. It was a moderate success and featured demos of Who songs as well as a showcase of his acoustic guitar talents. He collaborated with the Faces' bassist and fellow Meher Baba devotee Ronnie Lane on a duet album (1977's Rough Mix). In 1979 Townshend produced and performed guitar on the novelty single "Peppermint Lump" by Angie on Stiff Records, featuring 11-year-old Angela Porter on lead vocals.

Townshend made several solo appearances during the 1970s, two of which were captured on record: Eric Clapton's Rainbow Concert in January 1973 (which Townshend organized to revive Clapton's career after the latter's heroin addiction), and the Paul McCartney-sponsored Concerts for the People of Kampuchea in December 1979. The commercially available video of the Kampuchea concert shows the two rock icons duelling and clowning through Rockestra mega-band versions of "Lucille", "Let It Be", and "Rockestra Theme"; Townshend closes the proceedings with a characteristic split-legged leap.

Townshend's solo breakthrough, following the death of Who drummer Keith Moon, was the 1980 release Empty Glass, which included the top-10 single "Let My Love Open the Door", and lesser singles "A Little Is Enough" and "Rough Boys". This release was followed in 1982 by All the Best Cowboys Have Chinese Eyes, which included the popular radio track "Slit Skirts". While not a huge commercial success, music critic Timothy Duggan listed it as "Townshend's most honest and introspective work since Quadrophenia." Through the rest of the 1980s and early 1990s Townshend would again experiment with the rock opera and related formats, releasing several story-based albums including White City: A Novel (1985), The Iron Man: A Musical (1989), and Psychoderelict (1993). Townshend also got the chance to play with his hero Hank Marvin for Paul McCartney's "Rockestra" sessions, along with other rock musicians such as David Gilmour, John Bonham, and Ronnie Lane.

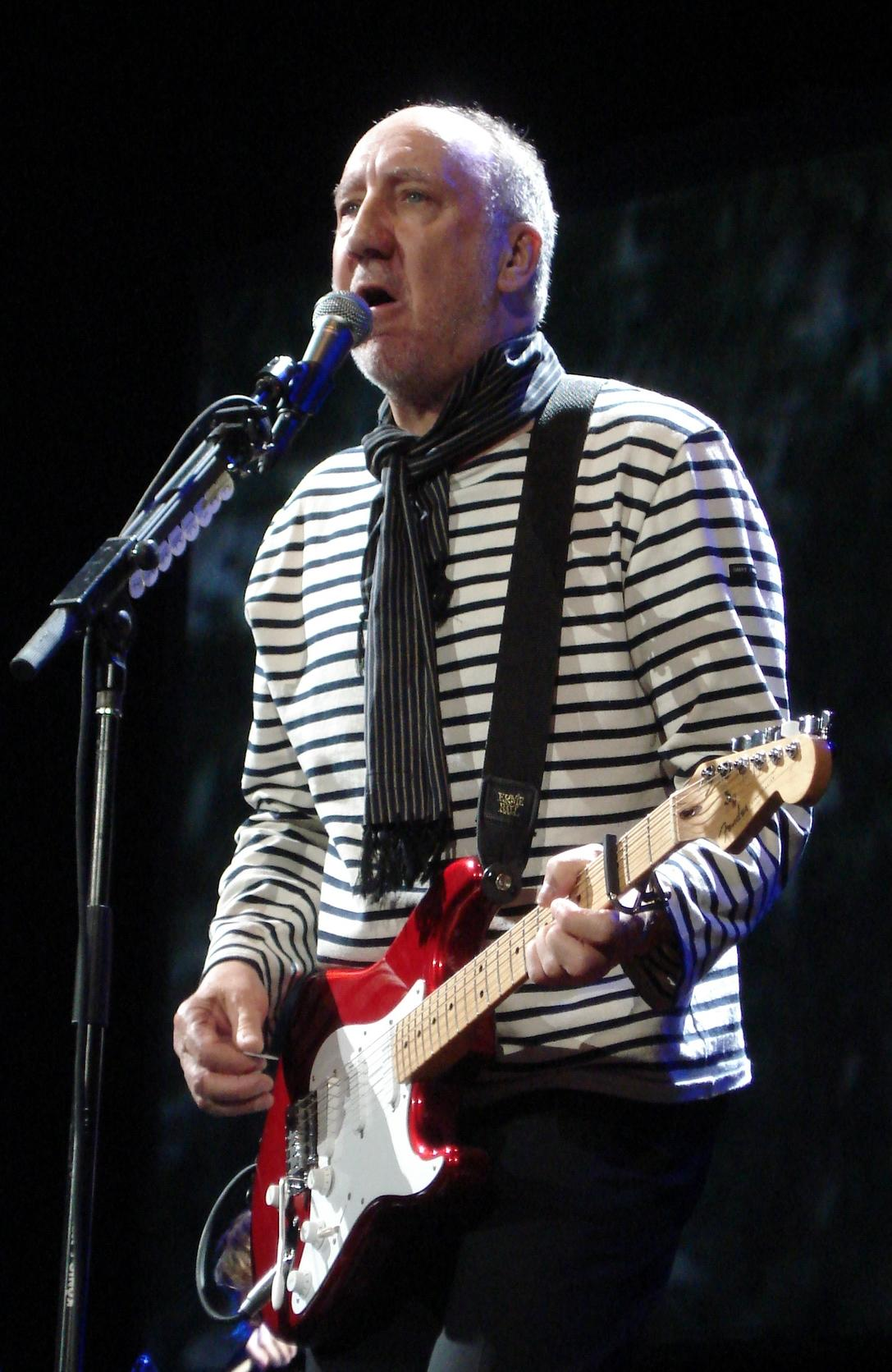
Townshend in concert, 2008

Townshend recorded several concert albums, including one featuring a supergroup he assembled called Deep End, with David Gilmour on guitar, who performed just three concerts and a television show session for The Tube, to raise money for his Double-O charity, supporting drug addicts. In 1993, he and Des McAnuff wrote and directed the Broadway adaptation of the Who album Tommy, as well as a less successful stage musical based on his solo album The Iron Man, based upon the book by Ted Hughes. McAnuff and Townshend later co-produced the animated film The Iron Giant, also based on the Hughes story.

A production described as a Townshend rock opera and titled The Boy Who Heard Music debuted as part of Vassar College's Powerhouse Summer Theater program in July 2007.

On 2 September 2017 at Tanglewood in Lenox, Massachusetts, Townshend embarked with fellow singer and musician Billy Idol, tenor Alfie Boe, and an orchestra on a short (5-date) "Classic Quadrophenia" US tour that ended on 16 September 2017 in Los Angeles, California. The 13 September 2017 performance at the Rosemont Theater in Chicago, Illinois included a guest appearance by Eddie Vedder.

=== 1996–present: Latest Who work ===
From the mid-1990s through the present, Townshend has participated in a series of tours with the surviving members of the Who, including a 2002 tour that continued despite Entwistle's death.

In February 2006, a major world tour by the Who was announced to promote their first new album since 1982. Townshend published a semi-autobiographical story The Boy Who Heard Music as a serial on a blog beginning in September 2005. The blog closed in October 2006, as noted on Townshend's website. It is now owned by a different user and does not relate to Townshend's work in any way. On 25 February 2006, he announced the issue of a mini-opera inspired by the novella for June 2006. In October 2006 the Who released their first album in 24 years, Endless Wire.

The Who performed at the Super Bowl XLIV half-time show on 7 February 2010, playing a medley of songs that included "Pinball Wizard", "Who Are You", "Baba O'Riley", "See Me, Feel Me", and "Won't Get Fooled Again". In 2012, the Who announced they would tour the rock opera Quadrophenia.

The Who were the final performers at the 2012 Summer Olympics closing ceremony in London, performing a medley of "Baba O'Riley", "See Me, Feel Me", and "My Generation".

On 22 March 2018, Townshend stated that a new Who album should feature original songs by Roger Daltrey as well as him. That album, simply titled Who, was released on 6 December 2019. It was the band's second album as a duo, and their first in thirteen years.

=== Unfinished work ===
The Age of Anxiety, formerly Floss the Musical, is the name given to a work-in-progress by Townshend. The musical has been a work in progress at least since 2009 with an original estimated release of 2011. On 24 January 2012 Townshend sold the rights to all of his back catalog and much of his future work including Floss The Musical if it is ever completed. He summarized the work in an interview with Sirius Satellite Radio published February 2010. In a 2015 interview Townshend stated that the work was intended to be an art installation. In March 2019 it was announced that a work titled The Age of Anxiety would be published as a novel, with an opera to follow.

== Musical influences ==
Townshend was born ten days after Nazi Germany surrendered in the Second World War, and he grew up in the shadow of reconstruction in and around London. According to Townshend, postwar trauma was the driving force behind the rock music revolution in the UK. "Trauma is passed from generation to generation", he said, "I've unwittingly inherited what my father experienced." Townshend notes that growing up in this period produced the narrative that runs through his music of a boy lost in the stresses and pressures of postwar life. In his autobiography, he wrote:

I wasn't trying to play beautiful music. I was confronting my audience with the awful, visceral sound of what we all knew was the single absolute of our frail existence—one day an aeroplane would carry the bomb that would destroy us all in a flash. It could happen at any time.

Although he grew up in a household with jazz musicians, Townshend absorbed many of his ideas about performance and rock music themes during art school. Townshend's roommate at Ealing Art College, Tom Wright, had a large record collection, and Townshend listened to and became influenced by R&B and rock & roll artists like Howlin' Wolf, John Lee Hooker, Bo Diddley, Booker T. & the MGs, Little Walter, and Chuck Berry. He was also strongly influenced by jazz bassist (and later, electronic musician and producer) Malcolm Cecil, who intentionally damaged his bass during a lecture, along with Gustav Metzger, pioneer of auto-destructive art. In light of these influences, guitar smashing became not just an expression of youthful angst, but also a means of conveying ideas through musical performance. "We advanced a new concept", he writes. "Destruction is art when set to music." Townshend also cited Robbie Basho as a significant influence, saying "I've totally been influenced by him. You can hear it in my work."

== Equipment ==
=== Guitars ===
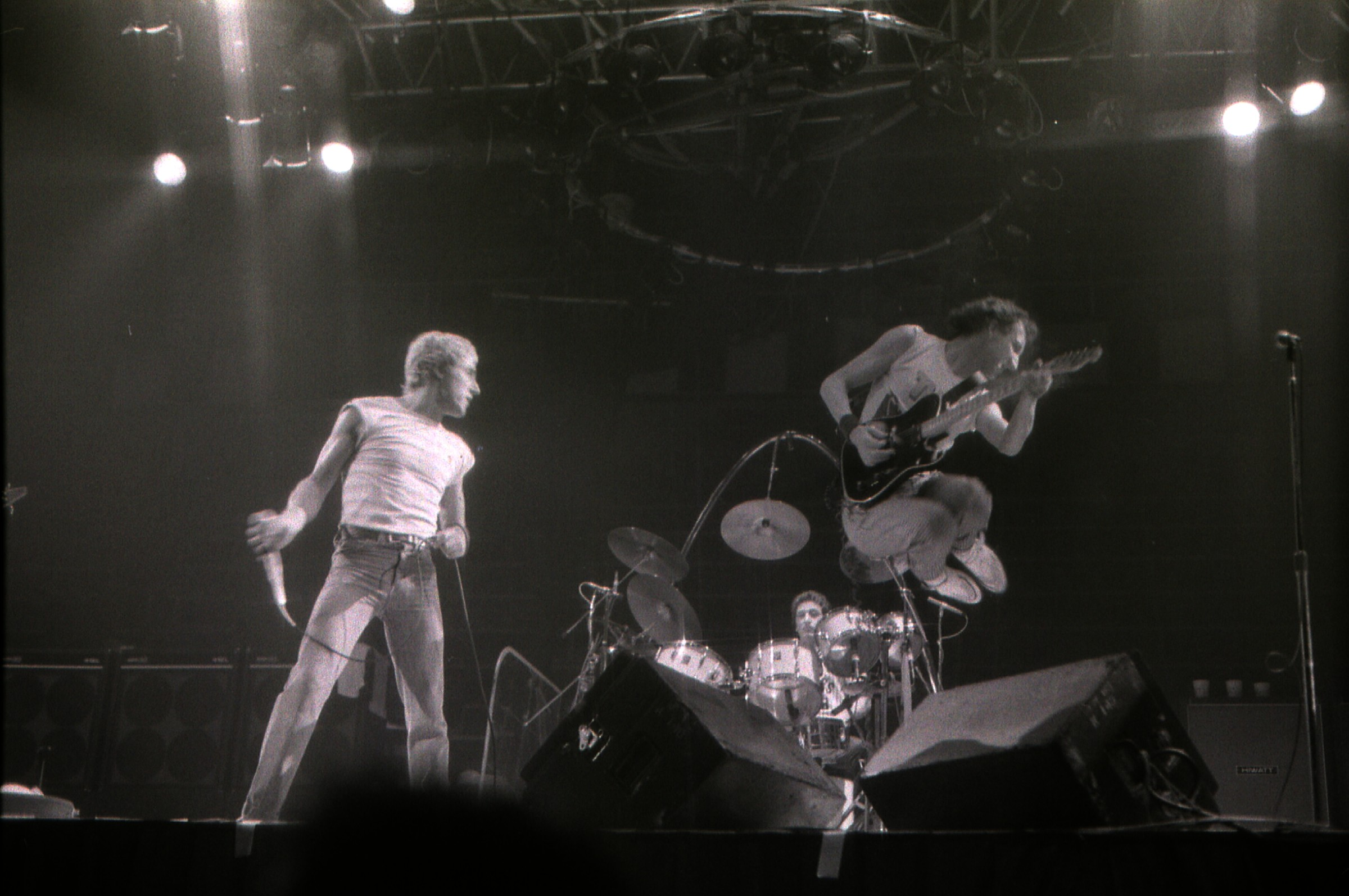
Townshend leaping into air in concert

Throughout his solo career and his career with the Who, Townshend has played a large variety of guitars—mostly various Fender, Gibson, and Rickenbacker models. He has also used Guild, Takamine and Gibson J-200 acoustic models, with the J-200 providing his signature recorded acoustic sound in such songs as "Pinball Wizard".

In the early days with the Who, Townshend played an Emile Grimshaw SS De Luxe and 6-string and 12-string Rickenbacker semi-hollow electric guitars primarily (particularly the Rose-Morris UK-imported models with special f-holes). When the excited audience responded enthusiastically after he accidentally broke the head off his guitar on a low ceiling during a concert at the Railway Hotel pub in Wealdstone, west London, he incorporated the eventual smashing of his instrument into the band's performances. However, as instrument-smashing became increasingly integrated into the Who's concert sets, he switched to more durable and resilient (and, importantly, cheaper) guitars for smashing, such as the Fender Stratocaster, Fender Telecaster and various Danelectro models. On the Who's The Smothers Brothers Comedy Hour appearance in 1967, Townshend used a Vox Cheetah guitar, which he only used for that performance; the guitar was destroyed by Townshend and Moon's drum explosion. In the late 1960s, Townshend began playing Gibson SG Special models almost exclusively. He used this guitar at the Woodstock and Isle of Wight shows in 1969 and 1970, as well as the Live at Leeds performance in 1970.

By 1970, Gibson changed the design of the SG Special that Townshend had been using previously, and he began using other guitars. For much of the 1970s, he used a Gibson Les Paul Deluxe, some with only two mini-humbucker pick-ups and others modified with a third pick-up in the "middle position" (a DiMarzio Superdistortion / Dual Sound). He can be seen using several of these guitars in the documentary The Kids Are Alright, although in the studio he often played a '59 Gretsch 6120 guitar (given to him by Joe Walsh), most notably on the albums Who's Next and Quadrophenia.

During the 1980s, Townshend mainly used Fenders, Rickenbackers and Telecaster-style models built for him by Schecter and various other luthiers. Since the late-1980s, Townshend has used Fender Eric Clapton Signature Stratocasters with Lace Sensor pick-ups, both in the studio and on tour. Some of his Stratocaster guitars feature a Fishman PowerBridge piezo pick-up system to simulate acoustic guitar tones. This piezo system is controlled by an extra volume control behind the guitar's bridge.

During the Who's 1989 tour, Townshend played a Rickenbacker guitar that was ironically smashed accidentally when he tripped over it. Instead of throwing the smashed parts away, Townshend reassembled the pieces as a sculpture. The sculpture was featured at the Rock Stars, Cars And Guitars 2 exhibit during the summer of 2009 at The Henry Ford museum.

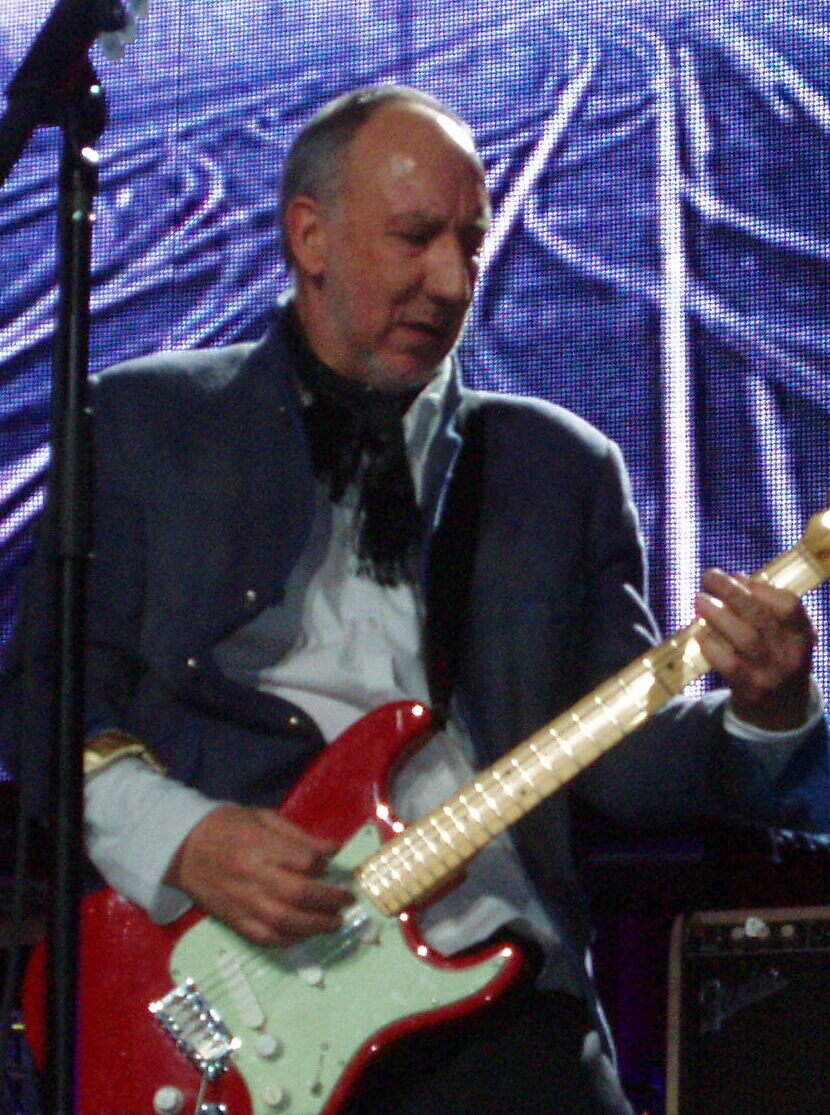
Townshend playing a Fender Eric Clapton Signature Stratocaster

There are several Gibson Pete Townshend signature guitars, such as the Pete Townshend SG, the Pete Townshend J-200, and three different Pete Townshend Les Paul Deluxes. The SG was clearly marked as a Pete Townshend limited-edition model and came with a special case and certificate of authenticity, signed by Townshend himself. There was a Pete Townshend signature Rickenbacker limited edition guitar of the model 1998, which was his main 6-string guitar in the Who's early days. The run featured 250 guitars that were made between July 1987–March 1988, and according to Rickenbacker CEO John Hall, the entire run sold out before serious advertising could be done.

He also used the Gibson ES-335, one of which he donated to the Hard Rock Cafe. Townshend also used a Gibson EDS-1275 double-neck very briefly circa late 1967, and both a Harmony Sovereign H1270 and a Fender Electric XII for the studio sessions for Tommy for the 12-string guitar parts. He also occasionally played a Fender Jazzmaster on stage in 1967 and 1968 and in the studio for Tommy.

He has always regarded his instruments as being merely tools of the trade and has, in latter years, kept his most prized instruments well away from the concert stage. These instruments include a few vintage and reissue Rickenbackers, the Gretsch 6120, an original 1952 Fender Telecaster, Gibson Custom Shop's artist limited edition reissues of Townshend's Les Paul DeLuxe models 1, 3 and 9 as well his signature SG Special reissue.

=== Amps ===
Over the years, Townshend has used many types of amplifier, including Vox, Selmer, Fender, Marshall, and Hiwatt, sticking to using Hiwatt amps for most of four decades. Around the time of Who's Next, he used a tweed Fender Bandmaster amp (also given to him by Joe Walsh in 1970), which he also used for Quadrophenia and The Who by Numbers. While recording Face Dances and the collaborative album Rough Mix, Townshend made use of a Peavey Vintage 4×10 amplifier in the studio. Since 1989, his rig consisted of four Fender Vibro-King stacks and a Hiwatt head driving two custom made 2×12" Hiwatt/Mesa Boogie speaker cabinets. However, since 2006, he has only three Vibro-King stacks, one of which is a backup.

Townshend figured prominently in the development of what is widely known in rock circles as the "Marshall stack". He ordered several speaker cabinets that contained eight 12" speakers in a housing standing nearly six feet in height with the top half of the cabinet slanted slightly upward. These were too heavy to move easily, so Jim Marshall cut the massive speaker cabinet in half, at the suggestion of Townshend, with each cabinet containing four 12-inch speakers. One of the cabinets had half of the speaker baffle slanted upwards and Marshall made these two cabinets stackable. The Marshall stack was born, and Townshend used these as well as Hiwatt stacks.

=== Keyboards ===
Townshend played keyboards on several Who songs. On Who's Next, he began to work with analogue synthesizers, using the ARP 2600 model that he first encountered at Cambridge University. He had this to say about the instrument: "I like synthesizers because they bring into my hands things that aren't in my hands: the sound of an orchestra, French horns, strings. There are gadgets on synthesizers that enable one to become a virtuoso on the keyboard. You can play something slowly and you press a switch and it plays it back at double speed. Whereas on the guitar you're stuck with as fast as you can play and I don't play fast, I just play hard. So when it goes to playing something fast I go to the synth."

The synths Townshend was referring to included the EMS VCS3 and ARP 2600, some of which modified a Lowrey TBO Berkshire organ. Current photos of his home studio also show an ARP 2500. Townshend was featured in ARP promotional materials in the early 1970s.

Since the late 1980s Townshend has predominantly used Synclavier Digital Audio systems for keyboard composition, particularly solo albums and projects.

== Literary work ==
Although known for his musical compositions and musicianship, Townshend has been extensively involved in the literary world for more than three decades, writing newspaper and magazine articles, book reviews, essays, books, and scripts.

An early example of Townshend's writing came in August 1970 with the first of nine installments of "The Pete Townshend Page", a monthly column written by Townshend for the British music paper Melody Maker. The column provided Townshend's perspective on an array of subjects, such as the media and the state of US concert halls and public address systems, as well as providing valuable insight into Townshend's mindset during the evolution of his Lifehouse project.

Townshend also wrote three sizeable essays for Rolling Stone magazine, the first of which appeared in November 1970. "In Love With Meher Baba" described Townshend's spiritual leanings. "Meaty, Beaty, Big and Bouncy", a blow-by-blow account of the Who compilation album of the same name, followed in December 1971. The third article, "The Punk Meets the Godmother", appeared in November 1977.

Also in 1977, Townshend founded Eel Pie Publishing, which specialised in children's titles, music books, and several Meher Baba-related publications. He also opened a bookstore named Magic Bus (after the popular Who song) in London. The Story of Tommy, a book written by Townshend and his art school friend Richard Barnes (now the Who's official biographer) about the writing of Townshend's 1969 rock opera and the making of the 1975 Ken Russell-directed film, was published by Eel Pie the same year.

In July 1983, Townshend took a position as an acquisitions editor for London publisher Faber and Faber. Notable projects included editing Animals frontman Eric Burdon's autobiography, Charles Shaar Murray's award-winning Crosstown Traffic: Jimi Hendrix and Post-War Pop, Brian Eno and Russell Mills's More Dark Than Shark, and working with Prince Charles on a volume of his collected speeches. Townshend commissioned Dave Rimmer's Like Punk Never Happened, and was commissioning editor for radical playwright Steven Berkoff.

Two years after joining Faber and Faber, Townshend decided to publish a book of his own. Horse's Neck, issued in May 1985, was a collection of short stories he'd written between 1979 and 1984, tackling subjects such as childhood, stardom and spirituality. As a result of his position with Faber and Faber, Townshend developed friendships with both Nobel prize-winning author of Lord of the Flies Sir William Golding and British Poet Laureate Ted Hughes. His friendship with Hughes led to Townshend's musical interpretation of Hughes's children's story The Iron Man, six years later, as The Iron Man: The Musical by Pete Townshend, released in 1989.

Townshend has written several scripts spanning the breadth of his career, including numerous drafts of his elusive Lifehouse project, the last of which, co-written with radio playwright Jeff Young, was published in 1999. In 1978, Townshend wrote a script for Fish Shop, a play commissioned but not completed by London Weekend Television, and in mid-1984 he wrote a script for White City: A Novel which led to a short film.

In 1989 Townshend began work on a novel titled Ray High & The Glass Household, a draft of which was later submitted to his editor. While the original novel remains unpublished, elements from this story were used in Townshend's 1993 solo album Psychoderelict. In 1993, Townshend authored another book, The Who's Tommy, a chronicle of the development of the award-winning Broadway version of his rock opera.

The opening of his personal website and his commerce site Eelpie.com, both in 2000, gave Townshend another outlet for literary work. (Eelpie.com was closed down in 2010.) Several of Townshend's essays have been posted online, including "Meher Baba—The Silent Master: My Own Silence" in 2001, and "A Different Bomb", an indictment of the child pornography industry, the following year.

In September 2005, Townshend began posting a novella online entitled The Boy Who Heard Music as background for a musical of the same name. He posted a chapter each week until it was completed, and novella was available to read at his website for several months. Like Psychoderelict, it was yet another extrapolation of Lifehouse and Ray High & The Glass Household.

In 1997 Townshend signed a deal with Little, Brown and Company publishing to write his autobiography, reportedly titled Pete Townshend: Who He? Townshend's creative vagaries and conceptual machinations have been chronicled by Larry David Smith in his book The Minstrel's Dilemma (Praeger 1999). After a lengthy delay, Townshend's autobiography, now titled Who I Am, was released 8 October 2012. The book ranked in the top 5 of The New York Times best seller list in October 2012.

On 5 March 2019, Townshend announced that his debut novel, titled The Age of Anxiety, would be published on 5 November 2019 by Hodder & Stoughton imprint Coronet. Townshend called the work an "extended meditation on manic genius and the dark art of creativity." The novel will be accompanied by an opera, which is currently in development, with an art installation to follow.

== Spirituality ==
In 1967 Townshend had begun to explore spirituality. Townshend swiftly absorbed all of Meher Baba's writings that he could find; by April 1968, he announced himself Baba's disciple. At about this time, Townshend, who had been searching the past two years for a basis for a rock opera, created a story inspired by the teachings of Baba and other writings and expressing the enlightenment he believed that he had received from them, which ultimately became Tommy.

In interviews Townshend was more open about his beliefs, penning an article on Baba for Rolling Stone magazine in 1970 and stating that following Baba's teachings, he was opposed to the use of all psychedelic drugs, making him one of the first rock stars with counterculture credibility to turn against their use. This did not prevent him from later indulging in substance abuse. He wrote in Who I Am of becoming addicted to cocaine in 1980-1981, to the point of overdosing and needing resuscitation. He also wrote that by January 1982, "I needed help to break my dependence on prescription drugs and heroin."

== Personal life ==
=== Relationships ===
Townshend met Karen Astley, daughter of film composer Edwin Astley, while in art school. They married on 20 May 1968 and moved into a three-bedroom townhouse in Twickenham in outer south-west London that overlooked the Thames. They have three children: Emma (born 1969), who is a gardening columnist, Aminta (born 1971), who works in film production, and Joseph (born 1989), who studied graphic design at Central St. Martins.

Townshend and his wife separated in 1994. He has since been in a romantic relationship with arranger and musician Rachel Fuller, whom he secretly married in 2016. Townshend lived at The Wick, Richmond, London, England, but sold the house in August 2021 for more than £15 million. He also owns a house in Churt, Surrey, and in 2010 purchased a lease of part of the National Trust property Ashdown House in Oxfordshire. According to The Sunday Times Rich List his assets were worth £40 million as of 2009.

=== Sexuality ===
In a 1989 interview with radio host Timothy White, Townshend apparently acknowledged his bisexuality, referencing the song "Rough Boys" on his 1980 studio album Empty Glass. He called the song a "coming out, an acknowledgment of the fact that I'd had a gay life, and that I understood what gay sex was about." In a 1994 interview for Playboy, he said, "I did an interview about it, saying that 'Rough Boys' was about being gay, and in the interview I also talked about my 'gay life', which—I meant—was actually about the friends I've had who are gay. So the interviewer kind of dotted the Ts and crossed the Is and assumed that this was a coming out, which it wasn't at all." Townshend later wrote in his 2012 autobiography Who I Am that he is "probably bisexual". Townshend also stated in this biography that he once felt sexually attracted to the Rolling Stones' lead vocalist, Mick Jagger.

=== Child sexual abuse images and sex offenders' register ===
Townshend accepted a caution from the Metropolitan Police (the Met) as part of Operation Ore, a major investigation on child sexual abuse images conducted in 2002–2003. The Met stated that "it was established that Mr. Townshend was not in possession of any downloaded child abuse images". Townshend was on a sex offenders' register for five years, beginning in 2003, after admitting he had used his credit card to access a child sexual abuse images website. Townshend said he accessed the images as research in a campaign against child sexual abuse – specifically, to prove that British banks were complicit in channelling the profits from paedophile rings. Authorities could not prove that the website accessed by Townshend involved children, and no incriminating evidence was found on his personal computer.

=== Hearing loss ===
Townshend suffers from partial deafness and tinnitus, likely the result of noise-induced hearing loss from long-term exposure to loud music. The Who were known as a very loud band in their live performances; for example, a Who concert at the Charlton Athletic Football Club on 31 May 1976—where the volume level 32 metres (105 ft) from the stage was measured at 126 decibels—was listed as the "Loudest Concert Ever" by the Guinness Book of Records. Townshend has also attributed his hearing loss to the explosion of Keith Moon's drum set during a 1967 Who appearance on The Smothers Brothers Comedy Hour.

In 1989, Townshend gave the initial funding to allow the formation of the non-profit hearing advocacy group H.E.A.R. (Hearing Education and Awareness for Rockers). After the Who performed at half-time at Super Bowl XLIV in 2010, Townshend stated that he is concerned that his tinnitus has grown to such a point that he might be forced to discontinue performing with the band altogether. He told Rolling Stone, "If my hearing is going to be a problem, we're not delaying shows. We're finished. I can't really see any way around the issue." Neil Young introduced him to an audiologist who suggested he use an in-ear monitor, and although they cancelled their spring 2010 touring schedule, Townshend used the device at their one remaining London concert on 30 March 2010, to ascertain the feasibility of Townshend continuing to perform with the Who.

In March 2011, Roger Daltrey said in an interview with the BBC that Townshend had recently experienced gradual but severe hearing loss and was trying to save what remained of his hearing: "Pete's having terrible trouble with his hearing. He's got really, really bad problems with it...not tinnitus, it's deterioration and he's seriously now worried about actually losing his hearing".

Referring to that, in July 2011, Townshend wrote at his blog: "My hearing is actually better than ever because after a feedback scare at the indigO2 in December 2008 I am taking good care of it. I have computer systems in my studio that have helped me do my engineering work on the forthcoming Quadrophenia release. I have had assistance from younger forensic engineers and mastering engineers to help me clean up the high frequencies that are out of my range. The same computer systems work wonderfully well on stage, proving to be perfect for me when the Who performed at the Super Bowl and doing Quadrophenia for TCT at the Royal Albert Hall in 2010. I'm 66, I don't have perfect hearing, and if I listen to loud music or go to gigs I do tend to get tinnitus".

=== Political views ===
In 1961, while in art school, Townshend joined the Young Communist League and was a prominent figure in their 1966 "Trend" recruitment campaign. In a 1974 Penthouse interview he stated that he recognised in practice he was a capitalist who was rewarded well for his work, but that his ideals were communist.

In 1998, Townshend was named in a list of the biggest private financial donors to the UK Labour Party. He refused to let Michael Moore use "Won't Get Fooled Again" in Fahrenheit 9/11 (2004), saying that he watched Bowling for Columbine (2002) and was not convinced.

In a widely reported 2012 interview with ABC, Townshend described himself jokingly as being "a bit of a neocon" stating that, "I like the idea of America as the world's police force. Then we don't have to do it. You guys sort it out."

In a 2019 interview with The Times, Townshend revealed he was in favour of the United Kingdom remaining in the European Union, stating, "I'm a Remainer, he [Roger Daltrey] is a Brexiteer. I believe in God, he doesn't."

== Charity work ==
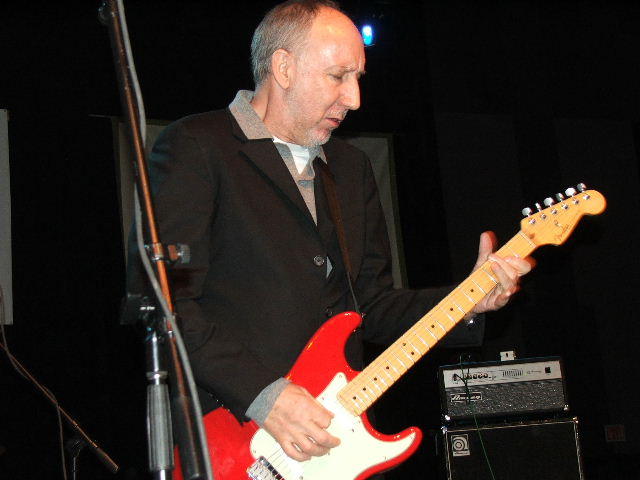
Townshend performing in Austin, Texas, as a supporting guest of friend and former Small Faces/Faces musician, Ian McLagan in 2007

Townshend has woven a long history of involvement with various charities and other philanthropic efforts throughout his career, both as a solo artist and with the Who. His first solo concert, for example, was a 1974 benefit show which was organised to raise funds for the Camden Square Community Play Centre.

The earliest public example of Townshend's involvement with charitable causes was in 1968, when Townshend donated the use of his former Wardour Street apartment to the Meher Baba Association. The following year, the association was moved to another Townshend-owned apartment, the Eccleston Square former residence of his wife Karen. Townshend sat on a committee that oversaw the operation and finances of the centre. "The committee sees to it that it is open a couple of days a week, and keeps the bills paid and the library full", he wrote in a 1970 Rolling Stone article.

In 1969 and 1972, Townshend produced two limited-release albums, Happy Birthday and I Am, for the London-based Baba association. This led to 1972's Who Came First, a more widespread release, 15 per cent of the revenue of which went to the Baba association. A further limited release, With Love, was released in 1976. A limited-edition boxed set of all three limited releases on CD, Avatar, was released in 2000, with all profits going to the Avatar Meher Baba Trust in India, which provided funds to a dispensary, school, hospital and pilgrimage centre.

In July 1976, Townshend opened Meher Baba Oceanic, a London activity centre for Baba followers, which featured film dubbing and editing facilities, a cinema and a recording studio. In addition, the centre served as a regular meeting place for Baba followers. Townshend offered very economical (reportedly £1 per night) lodging for American followers who needed an overnight stay on their pilgrimages to India. Townshend wrote in a 1977 Rolling Stone article:

For a few years, I had toyed with the idea of opening a London house dedicated to Meher Baba. In the eight years I had followed him, I had donated only coppers to foundations set up around the world to carry out the Master's wishes and decided it was about time I put myself on the line. The Who had set up a strong charitable trust of its own which appeased, to an extent, the feeling I had that Meher Baba would rather have seen me give to the poor than to the establishment of yet another so-called 'spiritual center'.

Townshend also embarked on a project dedicated to the collection, restoration and maintenance of Meher Baba-related films. The project was known as MEFA, or Meher Baba European Film Archive.

=== Children's charities ===
Townshend has been an active champion of children's charities. The debut of Townshend's stage version of Tommy took place at San Diego's La Jolla Playhouse in July 1992. The show was earmarked as a benefit for the London-based Nordoff-Robbins Music Therapy Foundation, an organisation that helps children with autism and intellectual disability.

Townshend performed at a 1995 benefit organised by Paul Simon at Madison Square Garden's Paramount Theatre for the Children's Health Fund. The following year, Townshend performed at a benefit for the annual Bridge School Benefit, a California facility for children with severe speech and physical impairments, with concerts organised by Neil and Pegi Young. In 1997, Townshend established a relationship with Maryville Academy, a Chicago area children's charity. Between 1997 and 2002, Townshend played five benefit shows for Maryville Academy, raising at least $1,600,000. His 1998 album A Benefit for Maryville Academy was made to support their activities and proceeds from the sales of his release were donated to them.

As a member of the Who, Townshend has also performed a series of concerts, beginning in 2000 to benefit the Teenage Cancer Trust in the UK, which raised several million pounds. In 2005, Townshend performed at New York's Gotham Hall for Samsung's Four Seasons of Hope, an annual children's charity fundraiser. In the same year, he donated a smashed guitar to the Pediatric Epilepsy Project.

On 4 November 2011, Roger Daltrey and Townshend launched the Daltrey/Townshend Teen and Young Adult Cancer Program at the Ronald Reagan UCLA Medical Center in Los Angeles, to be funded by the Who's charity Who Cares. The launch, followed on 5 November by a fund-raising event, was also attended by Robert Plant and Dave Grohl. Daltrey and Townshend founded Teen Cancer America, a nonprofit organization dedicated to improving the lives of teens and young adults with cancer.

In 2024, Townshend contributed guitar to a re-release of Mark Knopfler's "Going Home: Theme of the Local Hero" in aid of the Teenage Cancer Trust.

=== Drug rehabilitation ===
Townshend has also advocated for drug rehabilitation. In a 1985 radio interview, he said:

What I'm most active in doing is raising money to provide beds in clinics to help people that have become victims of drug abuse. In Britain, the facilities are very, very, very lean indeed ... although we have a national health service, a free medical system, it does nothing particularly for class A drug addicts – cocaine abusers, heroin abusers ... we're making a lot of progress ... the British government embarked on an anti-heroin campaign with advertising, and I was co-opted by them as a kind of figurehead, and then the various other people co-opted me into their own campaigns, but my main work is raising money to try and open a large clinic.

The "large clinic" Townshend was referring to was a drug treatment facility in London that he and drug rehabilitation experimenter Meg Patterson had devised, but the plan failed to come to fruition. Two early 1979 concerts by the Who raised £20,000 for Patterson's Pharmakon Clinic in Sussex.

Further examples of Townshend's drug rehabilitation activism took place in the form of a 1984 benefit concert (incidentally the first live performance of Manchester band the Stone Roses), an article he wrote a few days later for Britain's Mail on Sunday urging better care for the nation's growing number of drug addicts, and the formation of a charitable organisation, Double-O Charities, to raise funds for the causes he'd recently championed. Townshend also personally sold fund-raising anti-heroin T-shirts at a series of UK Bruce Springsteen concerts and reportedly financed a trip for former Clash drummer Topper Headon to undergo drug rehabilitation treatment. Townshend's 1985–86 band, Deep End, played two benefits at Brixton Academy in 1985 for Double-O Charities.

=== Amnesty International ===
In 1979 Townshend donated his services to the human rights organisation Amnesty International when he performed three songs for its benefit show The Secret Policeman's Ball—performances that were released on record and seen in the film of the show. Townshend's acoustic performances of three of his songs ("Pinball Wizard", "Drowned", and "Won't Get Fooled Again") were subsequently cited as forerunners and inspiration for the "unplugged" phenomenon in the 1990s.

Townshend had been invited to perform for Amnesty by Martin Lewis, the producer of The Secret Policeman's Ball, who stated later that Townshend's participation had been the key to his securing the subsequent participation for Amnesty (in the 1981 sequel show) of Sting, Eric Clapton, Jeff Beck, Phil Collins and Bob Geldof. Other performers inspired to support Amnesty International in future Secret Policeman's Ball shows and other benefits because of Townshend's early commitment to the organisation include Peter Gabriel, Bruce Springsteen, David Gilmour and U2's lead singer Bono who in 1986 told Rolling Stone magazine: "I saw The Secret Policeman's Ball and it became a part of me. It sowed a seed...."

== Discography ==
=== Solo albums ===
- Who Came First (1972)
- Rough Mix (1977) (with Ronnie Lane)
- Empty Glass (1980)
- All the Best Cowboys Have Chinese Eyes (1982)
- White City: A Novel (1985)
- The Iron Man: The Musical by Pete Townshend (1989)
- Psychoderelict (1993)

Townshend also released several albums dedicated to his spiritual mentor Meher Baba, listed on the discography page.

=== Guest appearances ===
In 1968 Townshend helped assemble a band called Thunderclap Newman consisting of three musicians he knew: pianist Andy Newman (an old art school friend), drummer John "Speedy" Keen (who had written "Armenia City in the Sky" for the Who to record for their 1967 studio album The Who Sell Out) and teenage guitarist Jimmy McCulloch (later to join Wings). Townshend produced the band and played bass on their recordings under the tongue-in-cheek pseudonym "Bijou Drains". Their first recording was the single "Something in the Air", which became a number one hit in the UK and a substantial hit elsewhere in the world. Following this success, Townshend produced their sole album, Hollywood Dream.

In 1971 Townshend, along with Keith Moon and Ronnie Lane, backed Mike Heron (of the Incredible String Band) on one song "Warm Heart Pastry" from Heron's first solo LP, Smiling Men with Bad Reputations. On the album notes, they are listed as "Tommy and the Bijoux".

In 1984 Townshend contributed lyrics to the track "I'm the Answer" on his brother Simon's debut solo album, Sweet Sound.

Townshend shares songwriting credit on two songs ("Love on the Air" and "All Lovers Are Deranged") on Pink Floyd guitarist David Gilmour's 1984 solo album About Face.

Townshend often recorded and performed alongside his girlfriend Rachel Fuller, a classically trained pianist and singer-songwriter.

In 2006 Townshend opened a website for implementation of The Lifehouse Method based on his 1971 Lifehouse concept. This website was in collaboration with composer Lawrence Ball and software developer David Snowden, with instrumentation by Steve Hills. Applicants at the website could input data to compose a musical "portrait" that the musical team could then develop into larger compositions for a planned concert or series of concerts.

Other appearances include:

- The Kids Are Alright with The Who, rockumentary, dir. by Jeff Stein (1979)
- "Because You're Young" with David Bowie on Scary Monsters (1980)
- Backing vocals on "Slave" with "The Rolling Stones" Tattoo You (1981)
- Acoustic guitar on "Ball and Chain" with Elton John on Jump Up! (1982)
- Backing vocals on "I'm the Answer" with Simon Townshend on Sweet Sound (1983)
- "Lonely at the Top" and "Hard Woman" with Mick Jagger on She's the Boss (1985)
- Guitar on "Town of Plenty" with Elton John on Reg Strikes Back (1988)
- Acoustic guitar with Prefab Sprout on "Hey Manhattan!" on From Langley Park to Memphis (1988)
- "Substitute" with the Ramones on Acid Eaters (1993)
- "Joy" and "Gun" with Mick Jagger on Goddess in the Doorway (2001)
- "Slow Burn" with David Bowie on Heathen (2002)
- "Angry" and "Move Over Busker" on Paul McCartney's Press to Play (1986)
- "Travelator" on Jean-Michel Jarre's Electronica 1: The Time Machine (2015)

== Bibliography ==
- The Story of Tommy (1977, Eel Pie Publishing) – with Richard Barnes
- Horse's Neck (1985, Faber and Faber) – short story collection
- The Who's Tommy (1993, Pantheon Books)
- The Who: Maximum R&B (2004, Plexus Publishing) – with Richard Barnes
- Who I Am (2012, HarperCollins) – autobiography
- The Age of Anxiety (2019, Coronet) – novel

== Awards ==
- BRIT Awards 1983 – Life Achievement Award
- Q Awards 1991 – Merit Award
- International Rock Awards 1991 – Living Legend Award
- Tony Award 1993 – Best Original Score (music & lyrics) – The Who's Tommy (tie)
- Grammy Awards 1994 – Best Musical Show Album (as composer and lyricist of The Who's Tommy)
- Q Awards 1998 – Songwriter Award
- Grammy Awards 2001 – Lifetime Achievement Award
- Ivor Novello Awards 2001 – Lifetime Achievement Award
- South Bank Show Award 2007 – Lifetime Achievement Award
- Honorary doctorate from University of West London, 2010
- MOJO Awards 2008 – Hall of Fame
- MOJO Awards 2008 – Classic Songwriter
- Classic Album Award for Quadrophenia from the Classic Rock Roll of Honour Awards at The Roundhouse, 9 November 2011, London, England
- TEC Awards 2013 – Les Paul Award
- Stevie Ray Vaughan Award 2015
- The George and Ira Gershwin Award 2016 – Lifetime Musical Achievement.
- American Academy of Achievement 2019 – Golden Plate Award. Townshend received his Golden Plate along with Roger Daltrey and presented by Awards Council member Peter Gabriel.

== Other lifetime honours ==
- 1990 Rock and Roll Hall of Fame
- 2005 UK Music Hall of Fame
- 2008 Kennedy Center Honors

== Citations ==
=== Cited references ===
- Giuliano, Geoffrey (2002). Behind Blue Eyes: The Life of Pete Townshend. Cooper Square Press. ISBN 978-1-46173-196-2.
- Howard, David (2004). Sonic Alchemy: Visionary Music Producers and Their Maverick Recordings. Hal Leonard Corporation. ISBN 978-0-634-05560-7.
- Marsh, Dave (1983). Before I Get Old: The Story of The Who. Plexus Publishing Ltd. ISBN 978-0-85965-083-0.
- Neill, Andrew; Kent, Matthew (2009). Anyway Anyhow Anywhere: The Complete Chronicle of The Who 1958–1978. Sterling Publishing. ISBN 978-0-7535-1217-3.
- Wilkerson, Mark (2006). Amazing Journey: The Life of Pete Townshend. Lulu Enterprises Incorporated. ISBN 978-1-411-67700-5.
- Wooldridge, Max (2002). Rock 'n' Roll London. Macmillan. ISBN 978-0-312-30442-3.
