= Rough Boys =

Single by Pete Townshend

from the album Empty Glass
- B-side: "And I Moved" (UK); "Jools and Jim" (US)
- Released: March 1980 (UK); November 1980 (US)
- Recorded: 1980
- Genre: Rock
- Length: 3:59
- Label: Atco
- Songwriter: Pete Townshend
- Producers: Pete Townshend; Chris Thomas

Pete Townshend singles chronology
"Street in the City" (1977)	"Rough Boys" (1980)	"Let My Love Open the Door" (1980)

Music video
- "Rough Boys" on YouTube

"Rough Boys" is the debut solo single written and performed by the English rock musician Pete Townshend, released in 1980 from his third solo studio album Empty Glass. Known for its homoerotic lyrics, the song was a minor chart hit in both the United Kingdom and the United States.

== Background ==
Townshend dedicated "Rough Boys" to the English punk rock band the Sex Pistols as well as his children, Emma and Minta, on the album sleeve of Empty Glass.

American rock singer Alice Cooper said of the song, "You have Pete's sexual ambiguity going on here — it sounds like a gay song. I still don't know exactly what he was trying to say with that song, but I love it, whatever it is. Pete's an amazing mystery."

During a 1989 interview with American rock music journalist Timothy White, Townshend made reference to the song "Rough Boys", calling the song a "coming out, an acknowledgment of the fact that I'd had a gay life, and that I understood what gay sex was about. I know how it feels to be a woman because I am a woman." Five years later, in an interview with Playboy, he said, "I did an interview about it, saying that 'Rough Boys' was about being gay, and in the interview I also talked about my 'gay life,' which—I meant—was actually about the friends I've had who are gay. So the interviewer kind of dotted the t's and crossed the i's and assumed that this was a coming out, which it wasn't at all."

The song was performed by Townshend with his band the Who regularly during their 1989 tour. A recording of one of these performances can be found on their two-disc live box set Join Together (1990).

== Release and critical reception ==
"Rough Boys" first appeared as the opening track on Townshend's third solo studio album Empty Glass (1980). In that same year, it was released as Townshend's debut solo single from said album in Britain, reaching No. 39 (Townshend's best UK showing as a solo artist). "Rough Boys" was later released in America as the third single from Empty Glass (following "Let My Love Open the Door" and "A Little Is Enough"), reaching No. 89 on the Billboard Hot 100.

A music video for "Rough Boys" was also created, featuring Townshend in a pool room with other men. The video was the 122nd video shown on MTV. Also some clips from the video appeared on one of their promos on the channel's debut on August 1, 1981.

"Rough Boys" has generally been praised as one of Pete Townshend's greatest solo efforts. Stephen Thomas Erlewine of AllMusic praised the song as a "blistering punk love letter" and called it a highlight of Empty Glass, while John Bergstrom of PopMatters said, "it’s rollicking and rowdy but really more pub rock than punk rock. In fact, it could almost be a more raw and ballsy Huey Lewis." Rolling Stone claimed that the song "is the most overtly homoerotic song in [Townshend's] catalogue." Record World called it a "brilliant rocker."

== Chart performance ==
=== Weekly charts ===
Chart (1980)	Peak position
UK Singles (Official Charts)	39
US Billboard Hot 100	89
