= Like Punk Never Happened =

Narrative history book on popular music

- Author: Dave Rimmer
- Publication date: 1985
- Pages: 191
- ISBN: 9780571137398

Like Punk Never Happened: Culture Club and the New Pop is a 1986 book about 1980s pop by music journalist Dave Rimmer. The book compares 1980s pop bands with the 1970s punk rock groups that preceded them. A new expanded edition was released in June 2022.
