= Horseneck, Pleasants County, West Virginia =

Coordinates: 39°19′17″N 081°16′50″W

Horseneck
- Unincorporated community
- Interactive map of Horseneck
- Country: United States
- State: West Virginia
- County: Pleasants
- Time zone: Eastern (EST)
- FIPS code: 1554745

Horseneck was an unincorporated community located in Pleasants County, West Virginia, United States. The Horseneck Post Office is no longer open.
