= Let My Love Open the Door =

1980 single by Pete Townshend

Single by Pete Townshend

from the album Empty Glass
- B-side: "Greyhound Girl"
- Released: 4 June 1980
- Genre: New wave; pop
- Length: 2:44
- Label: Atco
- Songwriter: Pete Townshend
- Producer: Chris Thomas

Pete Townshend UK singles chronology
"Rough Boys" (1980)	"Let My Love Open the Door" (1980)	"A Little Is Enough" (1980)

Pete Townshend US singles chronology
"Keep Me Turning" (1977)	"Let My Love Open the Door" (1980)	"A Little Is Enough" (1980)

Audio
- "Let My Love Open the Door" by Pete Townshend on YouTube
- "Let My Love Open the Door" (E. Cola Mix) by Pete Townshend on YouTube

"Let My Love Open the Door" is a song written and performed by the English rock musician Pete Townshend from his third solo studio album Empty Glass (1980). That year, it reached No. 9 on the US Billboard Hot 100 and peaked at No. 5 on the Canadian RPM's Top 100 singles chart.

Soon after the single's release, Record World anticipated that the song would "turn on pop radio to what AOR has known for weeks."

== Background ==
Townshend wrote in the liner notes of his compilation album Anthology (2005) that "Jesus sings" on the track. Cashbox called it a "joyous, blissful tune [that] features a stirring keyboard-synthesizer melody and multi-tracked high harmonies." Record World called it a "timeless pop-rocker."

"Let My Love Open the Door" was released as the second single from Empty Glass in Britain, where it was backed with the non-album tracks "Classified" and "Greyhound Girl." The song was a minor British hit, reaching number 46. The song saw great success when it was released as the debut single from Empty Glass in America, where the song reached number nine. It was Townshend's only solo top 10 hit on the Billboard Hot 100, but the Who's song "I Can See for Miles", which was written by Townshend, reached the same position on the chart 13 years earlier.

Initially, Townshend's manager despised the track due to it "not sounding like Townshend," and wanted it to be removed from Empty Glass. However, upon the song's chart success, he called Townshend to apologize.

Despite the song's critical and commercial success, Townshend did not consider it one of his best songs. He told Rolling Stone in an interview that "Let My Love Open the Door" was "just a ditty," also claiming that he preferred his minor US hit "A Little Is Enough" from the same album.

In 1996, Townshend released a new version of "Let My Love Open the Door", called "the E. Cola mix", turning the song into a ballad. This version appeared in different television shows and film soundtracks.

== Personnel ==
Credits are adapted from the Empty Glass liner notes.

- Pete Townshend – vocals, guitars, synthesizers
- John "Rabbit" Bundrick – keyboards, backing vocals
- Tony Butler – bass guitar, backing vocals
- Simon Phillips – drums

== Chart performance ==
=== Weekly charts ===
Chart (1980)	Peak position
Australia (Kent Music Report)	82
Canada Top Singles (RPM)	5
UK Singles (Official Charts)	46
US Billboard Hot 100	9
US Cash Box Top 100	11

Chart (2022)	Peak position
Canada Digital Song Sales	22
US Digital Song Sales (Billboard)	29

=== Year-end charts ===
Chart (1980)	Rank
Canada Top Singles (RPM)	35
US Billboard Hot 100	59
US Cashbox Top 100	92

== In popular culture ==
The song has been used frequently in film, most notably the comedy genre, often as trailer music, such as for Jerry Maguire (1996) and How Do You Know (2010). It has been featured in the closing credits for Look Who's Talking (1989), Grosse Pointe Blank (1997), Mr. Deeds (2002), Jersey Girl, Along Came Polly (both 2004), Old Dogs (2009), Red Dog (2011), Hit and Run (2012), Put Grandma in the Freezer (2018), The Adam Project (2022), respectively. In Dan in Real Life (2007), the song is performed by Steve Carell and Dane Cook and is covered by Sondre Lerche for the film's soundtrack. In 2004, the song was used in commercials for JCPenney during the holiday season. In 2021, it was used in the "All Night Long" episode of the Apple TV+ series Acapulco during the last scene and end credits. It was played after the wedding vows in the season finale of the Netflix series My Life with the Walter Boys. In A Big Bold Beautiful Journey (2025), the song is covered by Mitski for the film's soundtrack.
