= Big Country discography =

Scottish rock band discography

- Studio albums: 9
- Extended plays: 1
- Live albums: 18
- Compilation albums: 25
- Singles: 29

Scottish rock band Big Country, which formed in 1981, has released nine studio albums, eighteen live albums, twenty-five compilation albums, one extended play (EP), and twenty-nine singles released on Mercury Records, Reprise Records, Vertigo Records and Cherry Red Records.

Formed by Stuart Adamson following the demise of Skids, the band's classic line-up of Adamson (vocals/guitar), Bruce Watson (guitar), Tony Butler (bass) and Mark Brzezicki (drums) met with critical and commercial success during the 1980s. After signing to Mercury Records, Big Country's debut album The Crossing, released in 1983, reached number three in the UK Albums Chart and their subsequent albums Steeltown (1984), The Seer (1986) and Peace in Our Time (1988) all reached the top ten. By the time of the band's fifth album, No Place Like Home (1991), their commercial success had begun to wane and they released three more albums between 1993 and 1999 before the suicide of Adamson in 2001 led to the band splitting up.

In 2007, Butler, Watson and Brzezicki celebrated the twenty-fifth anniversary of Big Country by reforming for a UK tour, touring again in 2010, this time with Mike Peters joining the band for vocal duties. 2011 saw the release of a new single, the band's first new music for eleven years, before Butler retired in 2012. In 2013 the line-up of Watson, Brzezicki, Peters, joined by Derek Forbes (bass) and Watson's son Jamie (guitar), released the album, The Journey.

== Albums ==
=== Studio albums ===
Title	Album details	Peak chart positions										Certifications
Title	Album details	SCO	CAN	FIN	GER	NED	NZ	NOR	SWE	UK	US	Certifications
The Crossing	Released: 29 July 1983; Label: Mercury	24	4	—	—	11	8	—	17	3	18	CAN: Platinum; UK: Platinum; US: Gold
Steeltown	Released: 19 October 1984; Label: Mercury	54	53	24	53	33	15	12	28	1	70	UK: Gold
The Seer	Released: 30 June 1986; Label: Mercury	88	75	1	16	8	7	14	16	2	59	UK: Gold
Peace in Our Time	Released: 26 September 1988; Label: Reprise	—	—	6	40	—	—	—	25	9	160	UK: Silver
No Place Like Home	Released: 16 September 1991; Label: Vertigo	—	—	—	—	—	—	—	—	28	—	
The Buffalo Skinners	Released: 22 March 1993; Label: 20th Century Fox	23	—	—	—	—	—	—	—	25	—	
Why the Long Face	Released: 12 June 1995; Label: Transatlantic	24	—	—	—	—	—	—	—	48	—	
Driving to Damascus	Released: 27 September 1999; Label: Track	17	—	—	96	—	—	—	—	82	—	
The Journey	Released: 8 April 2013; Label: Cherry Red	32	—	—	—	—	—	—	—	68	—	
"—" denotes items that did not chart or were not released in that territory.

=== Live albums ===
- Without the Aid of a Safety Net (June 1994) UK No. 35
- Radio 1 Sessions (August 1994)
- BBC Live in Concert (August 1995)
- Eclectic (August 1996) UK No. 41
- Greatest Hits Live (Mar 1997) (same as "Without the Aid of a Safety Net")
- King Biscuit Flower Hour (March 1997)
- Brighton Rock (September 1997)
- Live at Wolverhampton (January 2000)
- Come Up Screaming (October 2000)
- Keep on Truckin (January 2001)
- Peace Concert, Live In East Berlin 1988 (January 2001)
- One in a Million (June 2001)
- Live Hits (Aug 2003) (from various concerts in 1984, 1986, 1988 and 1991)
- Das Fest - Live in Germany 95 (January 2002)
- Wonderland Live (German Armoury label) (January 2002) (this is just Brighton Rock but with different packaging and different track order)
- Live in Cologne (Apr 2002)
- Without the Aid of a Safety Net - The Complete Concert (2 CDs) (May 2005)
- Twenty Five Live (Nov 2007)
- Live 2011 Shepherds Bush Empire 15.04.2011 (2011)
- Dreams Stay With You, Edinburgh Picture House (2011)

=== Compilation albums ===
- Through a Big Country: Greatest Hits (May 1990) UK No. 2
- The Collection (February 1993)
- The Best of Big Country (February 1994)
- In a Big Country (June 1995)
- Master Series (March 1997)
- Kings of Emotion (April 1998)
- Restless Natives & Rarities (June 1998)
- Rarities II (April 2001)
- 20th Century Masters – The Millennium Collection: The Best of Big Country (April 2001)
- Greatest 12 Inch Hits (September 2001)
- Universal Masters Collection – Classic Big Country (November 2001)
- www.bigcountry.co.uk (November 2001)
- Greatest hits of Big Country & The Skids (May 2002) UK No. 71
- Singles Collection Vol. 1: The Mercury Years ('83 - '84) (6-CD box set) (July 2002)
- Singles Collection Vol. 2: The Mercury Years ('84 - '88) (7-CD box set) (October 2002)
- Rarities III (December 2002)
- Singles Collection Vol. 3: ('88–'93) (7-CD box set) (February 2003)
- Singles Collection Vol. 4: ('91–'00) (7-CD box set) (June 2003)
- The Collection (Spectrum Music) (October 2003)
- Rarities IV: (The Crossing Sessions) (November 2003)
- Rarities V: (No Place Like Home Sessions) (March 2004)
- Rarities VI (April 2004)
- Rarities VII: (The Damascus Sessions) (November 2004)
- Rarities VIII (November 2005)
- Fields of Fire – The Ultimate Collection (April 2011) UK No. 77
- And in the Beginning (2012)
- Big Country at the BBC (July 2013)
- Big Country at the BBC – The Best of the BBC Recordings (July 2013)
- And...In the Beginning (Dec 2012)
- Why The Long Face, 4CD Deluxe Expanded Box Set (June 2018)
- Essential (July 2020) UK No. 23

=== Other albums ===
- In the Scud (EP) (January 1999)
- Bon Apetit (EP) (September 1999)
- Big Country: The Nashville Album (April 2000)
- Undercover (covers album) (March 2001)

== Extended plays ==
Title	Year	Peak chart positions	
Title	Year	UK	US
Wonderland	Released: January 1984; Label: Mercury	—	65
Non!	Released: November 1995; Label: Transatlantic	77	—

== Singles ==
Title	Year	Peak chart positions									Album
Title	Year	UK	CAN	IRE	NL	NZ	SWI	US	US Alt	US Main	Album
"Harvest Home"	1982	82	—	—	—	—	—	—	x	—	The Crossing
"Fields of Fire (400 Miles)"	1983	10	—	9	—	26	—	52	x	—	The Crossing
"In a Big Country"	1983	17	3	22	—	34	—	17	x	3	The Crossing
"Chance"	1983	9	—	12	18	—	—	—	x	—	The Crossing
"Wonderland"	1984	8	—	4	—	—	—	86	x	48	Wonderland
"East of Eden"	1984	17	—	—	—	49	—	—	x	—	Steeltown
"Where the Rose Is Sown"	1984	29	—	25	—	—	—	—	x	—	Steeltown
"Just a Shadow"	1985	26	—	11	—	—	—	—	x	—	Steeltown
"Look Away"	1986	7	—	1	14	11	18	—	x	5	The Seer
"The Teacher"	1986	28	—	14	—	—	—	—	x	—	The Seer
"One Great Thing"	1986	19	—	12	—	—	—	—	x	—	The Seer
"Hold the Heart"	1986	55	—	—	—	—	—	—	x	—	The Seer
"King of Emotion"	1988	16	68	11	—	24	—	—	11	20	Peace in Our Time
"Broken Heart (Thirteen Valleys)"	1988	47	—	—	—	—	—	—	—	—	Peace in Our Time
"Peace in Our Time"	1989	39	—	16	—	—	—	—	—	—	Peace in Our Time
"Save Me"	1990	41	—	—	—	—	—	—	—	—	Through a Big Country (Greatest Hits)
"Heart of the World"	1990	50	—	—	—	—	—	—	—	—	Non-album song
"Republican Party Reptile"	1991	37	—	—	—	—	—	—	—	—	No Place Like Home
"Beautiful People"	1991	72	—	—	—	—	—	—	—	—	No Place Like Home
"Alone"	1993	24	—	—	—	—	—	—	—	—	The Buffalo Skinners
"Ships (Where Were You)"	1993	29	54	—	—	—	—	—	—	—	The Buffalo Skinners
"The One I Love"	1993	—	—	—	—	—	—	—	17	34	The Buffalo Skinners
"I'm Not Ashamed"	1995	69	—	—	—	—	—	—	—	—	Why the Long Face
"You Dreamer"	1995	68	—	—	—	—	—	—	—	—	Why the Long Face
"Fragile Thing" (with Eddi Reader)	1999	69	—	—	—	—	—	—	—	—	Driving to Damascus
"See You/Perfect World" (double A-side)	1999	77	—	—	—	—	—	—	—	—	Driving to Damascus
"Somebody Else"	2000	126	—	—	—	—	—	—	—	—	Driving to Damascus
"Another Country"	2011	—	—	—	—	—	—	—	—	—	The Journey
"Hurt"	2013	—	—	—	—	—	—	—	—	—	The Journey
"In a Broken Promise Land"	2013	—	—	—	—	—	—	—	—	—	The Journey
"—" denotes releases that did not chart. "x" denotes when that chart did not exist.
