= Without the Aid of a Safety Net =

Live album by Big Country
- Released: 6 June 1994
- Recorded: 29 December 1993
- Genre: Alternative rock; Celtic rock
- Label: Compulsion
- Producer: Big Country

Big Country chronology
The Buffalo Skinners (1993)	Without the Aid of a Safety Net (1994)	Radio 1 Sessions (1994)

Professional ratings
Review scores
Source	Rating
AllMusic	3.5/5 stars
NME	4/10

Without the Aid of a Safety Net is the first live album by the Scottish band Big Country, released in 1994. It contains a portion of the tracks from a concert at The Barrowland Ballroom, Glasgow, and was recorded on 29 December 1993. The full concert was released in 2005, labelled as 2CD Expanded Edition: The Complete Concert. This version features eight tracks not on the original release.

In June 1994, the album peaked at No. 35 in the UK Albums Chart.

== Critical reception ==
Upon its release, NME remarked, "Unfortunately for Big Country, 1983 is now a very long time ago – not that you'd guess it from this authentically sweaty live greatest hits set. 'Wonderland' and 'Chance' are as sturdily anthemic as ever, but this is strictly for those lad(d)ies who already love their Big Country."

== Track listing ==
1. "Harvest Home" (3:27)
2. "Just a Shadow" (3:33)
3. "13 Valleys" (5:04)
4. "The Storm" (4:51)
5. "Chance" (3:44)
6. "Look Away" (4:20)
7. "What Are You Working For" (4:00)
8. "Steeltown" (5:38)
9. "Ships" (6:06)
10. "Wonderland" (5:54)
11. "In a Big Country" (6:21)

The cassette and CD releases include these additional tracks:

- "Peace in Our Time" (3:20)
- "Long Way Home" (6:01)
- "Lost Patrol" (6:10)

== 2005 release ==
All tracks written by Stuart Adamson, Tony Butler, Bruce Watson and Mark Brzezicki, unless stated otherwise.

=== Disc one ===
1. "Introduction"
2. "Harvest Home"
3. "Peace in Our Time"
4. "Just a Shadow"
5. "13 Valleys" (Adamson)
6. "Winter Sky" * (Adamson, Watson)
7. "The Storm"
8. "Chance"
9. "Tracks of My Tears" * (William Robinson, Marvin Tarplin, Warren Moore)
10. "Rockin' in the Free World" * (Neil Young)
11. "All Go Together" * (Adamson, Watson)
12. "We're Not in Kansas" * (Adamson)
13. "Look Away" (Adamson)
14. "What Are You Working For" (Adamson)
15. "Steeltown"

=== Disc two ===
1. "Stuart and the Audience"
2. "Ships (Were Where You)" (Adamson, Watson)
3. "Wonderland"
4. "Long Way Home" (Adamson)
5. "Alone" (Adamson)
6. "In a Big Country"
7. "The Audience - Encore"
8. "Lost Patrol"
9. "(Hey Hey My My) Out of the Blue (Into the Black)" * (Neil Young)
10. "Fields of Fire" *

All tracks marked (*) were previously unreleased.

== Personnel ==
- Stuart Adamson - guitar, vocals
- Mark Brzezicki - drums, percussion, vocals
- Tony Butler - bass guitar, vocals
- Bruce Watson - guitar, mandolin
