= Big Country at the BBC =

Box set by Big Country
- Released: 29 July 2013
- Recorded: 1982–1990, at BBC Maida Vale, Hammersmith Palais, Edinburgh Playhouse, Wembley Stadium, Hammersmith Odeon, Reading Festival, Sefton Park, Liverpool, Soviet Embassy London and Botanic Gardens, Glasgow.
- Genre: Rock, pop
- Language: English
- Label: Mercury Records/Universal
- Producer: John Williams, Various

Big Country at the BBC is a box set compilation comprising Big Country's recordings and sessions for the BBC between 1982 and 1990. It includes performances from Wembley Stadium, Reading Festival, Hammersmith Palais and London's Soviet Embassy as well as all of the band's appearances on television shows such as Top of the Pops, The Old Grey Whistle Test and The Oxford Road Show.

The box set – which comprises three CDs and a 39-track DVD – features introductory notes by Big Country's Bruce Watson, Tony Butler and Mark Brzezicki along with interviews and liner notes by journalist and author Tim Barr.

A double-CD set, Big Country at the BBC: The Best of the BBC Recordings, is also available.

== Album listing ==
Big Country at the BBC includes a total of 81 tracks, ranging from their earliest recording for the BBC – the John Williams-produced session for Kid Jensen's BBC Radio 1 show recorded at Maida Vale and broadcast on 23 August 1982 – to an interview with Stuart Adamson and performance of "Heart of the World" filmed in Glasgow's Botanic Gardens in 1990 for BBC Scotland's Garden Party show. The set includes their session for John Peel, also recorded at the BBC's Maida Vale Studios, which were broadcast on 22 February 1983. Live performances, recorded for the BBC's long-running In Concert series, capture the band as they move from up-and-coming chart-bound hopefuls at the Hammersmith Palais or Reading Festival in 1983, to a million-selling stadium act performing alongside Elton John at Wembley the following year.

The band's performance at London's Soviet Embassy on 22 September 1988 is also included as well as an In Concert recording taken from their three sell-out Hammersmith Odeon shows – on the subsequent Peace in Our Time tour – in January 1989.

Footage from Top of the Pops (including two separate performances of both "Fields of Fire" and "In a Big Country" from their 1983 chart run), The Old Grey Whistle Test and In Concert is featured on the DVD. Its centrepiece is Big Country's Hogmanay performance from Edinburgh Playhouse, originally screened live as part of the BBC's New Year celebrations in 1984/1985. Billy Sloan, who fronted the broadcast for Whistle Test, is quoted in the sleeve notes and recalls that, as 1985 arrived, he had nothing stronger than "Scotland’s other national drink" Irn-Bru to toast the band with. Big Country's Bruce Watson remembers the temperature had risen so much in the 3,000-seat venue that, though the band members had bottles of champagne to greet the New Year with (and share with a few lucky members of the audience), they were sweating so much their hands were too slippery to open them, occasioning a momentary panic on stage.

A full In Concert performance from Reading Hexagon is included, featuring a number of the band's best-known hits such as "Wonderland", "Look Away", "Chance", "In a Big Country" and "Fields of Fire".

The DVD also includes footage, previously unseen outside Scotland, of Stuart Adamson being interviewed by his former Skids bandmate Richard Jobson for BBC Scotland's Garden Party – a short-lived TV show based around the celebrations for Glasgow's year as City of Culture in 1990.

A total of 30 previously unreleased tracks are included in Big Country at the BBC.

== Critical reception ==
Big Country at the BBC was released on 29 July 2013 as the band were in the middle of a two-month North American tour. Bruce Watson and Mark Brzezicki made a video talking about their reaction to the release for Big Country's official website. Former member Tony Butler – who appears throughout Big Country at the BBC - also greeted its arrival warmly. He told Kirsty McCormack of the Daily Express: "To see, after all these years, such a collection of recordings and great memories made by the BBC makes me feel we got there. I mean, it’s the BBC! How cool."

McCormack herself enthused: "This is the Big Country that broke massively worldwide with the release of debut album The Crossing’s singles Fields of Fire, Chance and signature song in a Big Country', which went on to become massive worldwide hits, selling over two million copies and driving The Crossing to three prestigious Grammy nominations in the USA."

In a four-star review for Record Collector magazine, Terry Staunton insisted the box set showcased "a fiery combo who forged a powerful bond with their devoted following". He added: "The additional DVD is the very definition of generous, comprising 39 clips from the likes of Top of the Pops, The Old Grey Whistle Test and Oxford Road Show".

On his radio show, syndicated across Scotland on the Bauer network, on 4 August 2013, Billy Sloan played several excerpts from the box set alongside tracks by Kings of Leon, The Moon Kids, Manic Street Preachers and Tom Odell. He again told the story of greeting Stuart and the band after their Hogmanay performance with nothing stronger than Irn-Bru. Sloan also selected "King of Emotion" from the 1989 Hammersmith Odeon performance and Lost Patrol from Wembley, 1984, telling listeners to the show how impressed he was with the packaging and content of the box set.

== Bonus features ==
Included in the set is a 36-page hardback book featuring exclusive interviews and rare photographs by Paul Cox together with a number of postcards featuring Big Country artwork.

The sleeve notes include an interview with David Lloyd of Uropa Lula who shares his reminiscences of the audience hysteria that surrounded Big Country when the two bands played together on the Crossing the Country tour in 1983.

An illustration, by Mark Brezicki, is featured in the booklet, showing BBC outside broadcast trucks outside a Big Country gig and the four members of the group in a punningly-named pub called the Maid of Ale.

In his introduction to the collection, Tony Butler also remembers his time as a BBC clerk before becoming a professional musician.

== Big Country at the BBC: The Best of the BBC Recordings ==
A two-disc set, containing 31 tracks culled from the box set's three audio discs, was released simultaneously. It deletes performances of "Broken Heart (Thirteen Valleys)" and "King of Emotion" from the Soviet Embassy show and loses "Peace in Our Time" and "Look Away" from the Hammersmith Odeon concert in 1989. The other three concert performances included have also been edited down to three or four tracks each.

== Mastering ==
Big Country at the BBC was mastered by Jared Hawkes at Universal Mastering London.

== See also ==
Other notable Big Country releases preceding this box set are as follows:

- Big Country – The Journey
- Big Country – The Crossing 30th Anniversary Deluxe Edition
- Big Country – Another Country
