= The Seer (Big Country album) =

Studio album by Big Country
- Released: 30 June 1986
- Recorded: November 1985 – February 1986
- Studios: Power Plant (London); RAK Studios (London)
- Genres: Alternative rock, new wave, Celtic rock
- Length: 46:46
- Label: Mercury
- Producer: Robin Millar

Big Country chronology
Steeltown (1984)	The Seer (1986)	Peace in Our Time (1988)

Singles from The Seer
- 1. "Look Away" Released: 4 April 1986; 2. "The Teacher" Released: 13 June 1986; 3. "One Great Thing" Released: 5 September 1986; 4. "Hold the Heart" Released: 21 November 1986

Professional ratings
Review scores
Source	Rating
AllMusic	2.5/5 stars
Kerrang!	3/5 stars
Sounds	4/5 stars
Martin C. Strong	6/10

The Seer is the third studio album by the Scottish band Big Country, released in 1986. The album featured very traditional Scottish musical settings, reminiscent of the band's debut album The Crossing (1983). Kate Bush worked on the title song in a duet with lead singer and lyricist Stuart Adamson. The album's first single, "Look Away", was an Irish number one, and was also the group's biggest hit single in the UK, reaching number 7.

The album reached number 2 in the UK Albums Chart.

== Lyrics and music ==
The Seer saw Big Country return to the sweeping Scottish sound that had made them famous on The Crossing. It is sometimes considered to be the band's most overtly Celtic album, with many of the songs containing explicit or veiled references to Scottish history - for example, "Remembrance Day" deals with the Highland Clearances (in which thousands of Highlanders were relocated to British colonial possessions such as Canada and New Zealand), "Red Fox" is about the 1752 Appin Murder, and the title track concerns the seventeenth century mystic the Brahan Seer.

== Mixes ==
The album was given two separate mixes. The first was done by producer Robin Millar with the input of the band. This mix was rejected by the band's record label for being not commercial enough, and Walter Turbitt was brought in to remix the album. Turbitt's mix, which was eventually released, was disliked by the band, as it had more overtly poppy elements (such as added reverberation) in contrast to Millar's drier, crisper mix. The original mix remains unreleased, with the exception of "Look Away," the single version of which was released before the remix had been completed.

== Reception ==
Critic Anthony DeCurtis of Rolling Stone gave The Seer a positive review, calling it "possibly [the band's] strongest effort to date":

Happily, Big Country's vision – articulated by Adamson's songwriting – is as generous and determined as ever. The single "Look Away" and the ballad "Hold the Heart," both chronicles of lost love, capture Adamson's grim romanticism, his characteristic urge to transcend but not deny emotional ravishment. "One Great Thing," "I Walk the Hill" and "Eiledon" are stirring expressions of the desire for individual integrity and a future filled with peace.

== Track listing ==
Songs written by Stuart Adamson unless otherwise noted.

*Note: writing credits as per original vinyl edition and the ASCAP song database.

Side One
No.	Title	Writer(s)	Length
1.	"Look Away"		4:23
2.	"The Seer"	Adamson, Bruce Watson	5:26
3.	"The Teacher"		4:05
4.	"I Walk the Hill"	Adamson, Mark Brzezicki, Tony Butler	3:30
5.	"Eiledon"		5:35

Side Two
No.	Title	Writer(s)	Length
6.	"One Great Thing"	Adamson, Butler	4:00
7.	"Hold the Heart"		6:04
8.	"Remembrance Day"	Adamson, Butler, Watson	4:28
9.	"The Red Fox"		4:09
10.	"The Sailor"	Adamson, Brzezicki	4:52
Total length:			46:32

1996 reissue bonus tracks

11. "Song of the South" [B-side of "One Great Thing"] – 3:48
12. "Look Away" (12" mix) – 6:31
13. "One Great Thing" (Adamson, Butler) (Disco Mix) – 6:11
14. "Giant" (Adamson, Brzezicki, Butler, Watson) [B-side of "Wonderland", 1984] – 3:55

=== 2014 reissue ===
Bonus tracks

11. "Restless Natives" [B-side of "Look Away"] – 4:00
12. "Margo's Theme" [B-side of "Look Away"] – 3:42
13. "Highland Scenery" [B-side of "Look Away"] – 4:06
14. "Home Came the Angels" [B-side of "The Teacher"] – 2:07
15. "Song of the South" (7" version) [B-side of "One Great Thing"] – 3:49
16. "Honky Tonk Woman" (live at the Pier, New York, 1986) (Mick Jagger, Keith Richards) [B-side of "Hold the Heart"] – 3:54
17. "Hold the Heart" (instrumental) [B-side of "Hold the Heart"] – 6:07

Bonus disc

1. "Restless Natives" (Restless Natives soundtrack part 1) [B-side of "Look Away" 12"] – 16:43
2. "Restless Natives" (Restless Natives soundtrack part 2) [B-side of "The Teacher" 12"] – 18:08
3. "I Will Run for You" [complete Restless Natives film version; previously unreleased] – 4:24
4. "Look Away" (12" Mix) – 6:32
5. "The Teacher" (Mystery Mix) – 5:40
6. "One Great Thing" (Boston Mix) (Adamson, Butler) – 5:34
7. "Song of the South" (full version) – 5:04
8. "Look Away" (Outlaw Mix) – 6:54
9. "One Great Thing" (Big Baad Country Mix) (Adamson, Butler) – 6:12

== Charts ==
=== Weekly charts ===
Chart (1986)	Peak position
Canadian Albums (RPM)	75
Dutch Albums (Album Top 100)	8
Finnish Albums (Suomen virallinen lista)	1
German Albums (Offizielle Top 100)	16
New Zealand Albums (RMNZ)	7
Norwegian Albums (VG-lista)	14
Swedish Albums (Sverigetopplistan)	16
Swiss Albums (Schweizer Hitparade)	15
UK Albums (Official Charts)	2
US Billboard 200	59

=== Year-end charts ===
Chart (1986)	Position
Dutch Albums (Album Top 100)	78

== Personnel ==
Adapted from the album liner notes.

Big Country

- Stuart Adamson – vocals, guitar, EBow
- Mark Brzezicki – drums, percussion, vocals
- Tony Butler – bass, bass pedals, vocals
- Bruce Watson – guitar, mandolin, sitar

Additional personnel

- Kate Bush – additional vocals on "The Seer"
- June Miles-Kingston – backing vocals on "Eiledon" and "Remembrance Day"
- Davie Duncan – bodhran

Technical

- Robin Millar – original production
- Walter Turbitt – additional production, mixing
- Will Gosling – engineer
- Dave Anderson – assistant engineer
- Phil Legg – assistant engineer
- Nick Lacey – assistant engineer
- Russell Leahy – assistant engineer
- Julian Balme – sleeve
- David Da Silva – illustration

Bonus tracks

- Robin Millar – production on "Song of the South"
- Steve Lillywhite – production on "Giant"
- Geoff Emerick – production on "Restless Natives", "I Will Run for You", "Margo's Theme", "Highland Scenery" and "Home Came the Angels"
- Will Gosling – mixing on "Song of the South"
- Tony Butler – mixing on "Song of the South"
- David Batchelor – mixing on "Honky Tonk Woman"
