= Venustraphobia =

Studio album by Casbah Club
- Released: June 17, 2006
- Recorded: 2005–2006 at KD Studios, West London and Eel Pie Studios
- Genre: Mod rock, hard rock
- Length: 53:05
- Label: Stir Music
- Producer: Simon Townshend

Simon Townshend chronology
Simontownshendis (2002)	Venustraphobia (2006)	Looking Out Looking In (2012)

Venustraphobia is the debut album by the rock band Casbah Club, released in 2006. The album uses many of Simon Townshend's well received solo songs. The term venustraphobia supposedly means the fear of beautiful women.

== Track listing ==
All songs by Casbah Club, if not noted:

No.	Title	Length
1.	"Sex Change"	5:00
2.	"Twenty to Eleven"	2:04
3.	"When She Sleeps"	4:10
4.	"Comeback"	3:44
5.	"Medicine"	3:22
6.	"Any Way She Moves" (Casbah Club, Stuart Adamson, Mark Brzezicki, Tony Butler, Bruce Watson and Paul Weller)	2:58
7.	"Venustraphobia"	4:48
8.	"Ages"	4:08
9.	"Fly Away" (Simon Townshend, Andy Kravitz)	4:08
10.	"Raised"	3:48
11.	"Save Me From Me"	4:06
12.	"Highness"	5:20
13.	"Our Time"	6:22

== Personnel ==
Casbah Club

- Simon Townshend - Lead vocals, guitar, keyboards
- Bruce Foxton - Bass guitar, backing vocals
- Bruce Watson - Guitar, E-bow
- Mark Brzezicki - Drums, percussion, backing vocals

Production

- Simon Townshend - Producer:
- Patrick Bird - Engineers
- Wes Maebe - Engineers
- Kenny Denton - Mixing (except "Any Way She Moves", mixed by Myles Clark at Eel Pie Studios)
