= Radio 1 Sessions (Big Country album) =

Live album by Big Country
- Released: 1 August 1994
- Recorded: 12 August 1982 – 9 March 1983
- Genre: Alternative rock, celtic rock
- Label: Windsong
- Producer: John Porter, John Williams

Big Country chronology
Without the Aid of a Safety Net (1994)	Radio 1 Sessions (1994)	Why the Long Face (1995)

Professional ratings
Review scores
Source	Rating
Allmusic	2/5 stars

Radio 1 Sessions is the second live album released by the Scottish band Big Country, released in 1994.

== Track listing ==
1. "Close Action" (Big Country) – 3:45
2. "Heart and Soul" (Big Country) – 4:48
3. "Harvest Home" (Adamson, Big Country) – 4:06
4. "Angle Park" (Adamson, Big Country, Watson) – 4:05
5. "Inwards" (Big Country) – 4:17
6. "1000 Stars" (Big Country) – 4:21
7. "Porroh Man" (Big Country) – 7:28
8. "Close Action" (Big Country) – 3:55

== Personnel ==
- Stuart Adamson - guitar, vocals
- Mark Brzezicki - drums, percussion
- Tony Butler - bass, vocals
- Bruce Watson - guitar, vocals
