= Where the Rose Is Sown =

Single by Big Country

from the album Steeltown
- B-side: "Belief in the Small Man"; "Bass Dance"; "Prairie Rose"
- Released: 16 November 1984
- Length: 4:13
- Label: Mercury; Vertigo (Canada)
- Songwriters: Stuart Adamson; Mark Brzezicki; Tony Butler; Bruce Watson
- Producer: Steve Lillywhite

Big Country singles chronology
"East of Eden" (1984)	"Where the Rose Is Sown" (1984)	"Just a Shadow" (1985)

Where the Rose is Sown is a song by Scottish rock band Big Country, which was released in 1984 as the second single from their second studio album Steeltown. It was written by Big Country and produced by Steve Lillywhite. "Where the Rose Is Sown" peaked at No. 29 in the UK and No. 25 in Ireland.

== Music video ==
A music video was filmed to promote the single. It received medium rotation on MTV.

== Critical reception ==
Upon release, Lesley White of Smash Hits commented: "More of the same from the frustrated messiahs of contemporary rock. A treat for lovers of "real music" everywhere - give me artful pretence any day." Sunie of Number One said: ""It's the lovin' things you do..." Anyone remember the old '60s hit? It lurks just behind this song, artfully obscured by guitar solos, "heeyahs" and the Lillywhite wall of sound. I rather like it."

Cash Box commented: "Big Country delivers a pounding slice of tragic political rock which is given its edge in Adamson's biting delivery. Trademark guitar riffs and a no-nonsense beat should help [it] become another anthemic classic from the band." Billboard stated: "Group's stirring strength is sadly buried in muddy sound."

In a retrospective review of Steeltown, Tim Peacock of Record Collector described the song as one of the album's "obvious go-to tracks", adding that it had an anti-war message "especially resonant in the wake of the Falklands".

== Track listing ==
7" single

1. "Where the Rose Is Sown" - 4:03
2. "Belief in the Small Man" - 5:12

7" single (German release)

1. "Where the Rose Is Sown" - 4:08
2. "Bass Dance" - 1:40

7" single (US/Canada release)

1. "Where the Rose Is Sown" - 4:08
2. "Prairie Rose" - 4:50

7" single (UK limited edition release)

1. "Where the Rose Is Sown" - 4:03
2. "Belief in the Small Man" - 5:12
3. "Wonderland" - 4:47 (Recorded live in Austin, Texas, 22 March 1984)
4. "In a Big Country" - 6:15 (Recorded live in Austin, Texas, 22 March 1984)
5. "Auld Lang Syne" - 1:09 (Recorded live in Austin, Texas, 22 March 1984)

7" single (US promo)

1. "Where the Rose Is Sown" - 3:58
2. "Where the Rose Is Sown" - 3:58

12" single

1. "Where the Rose Is Sown (Extended Remix)" - 7:43
2. "Where the Rose Is Sown (7" Version)" - 4:03
3. "Bass Dance" - 1:40
4. "Belief in the Small Man" - 5:12

12" single (German release)

1. "Where the Rose Is Sown (Extended Remix)" - 7:43
2. "Bass Dance" - 1:40
3. "Belief in the Small Man" - 5:12

12" single (Canadian release)

1. "Where the Rose Is Sown" - 4:44
2. "Prairie Rose" - 4:47

12" single (US promo)

1. "Where the Rose Is Sown" - 3:58
2. "Where the Rose Is Sown" - 3:58

== Chart performance ==
Chart (1984)	Peak position
Irish Singles Chart	25
UK Singles Chart	29

== Personnel ==
Big Country

- Stuart Adamson - vocals, guitar
- Bruce Watson - guitar
- Tony Butler - bass
- Mark Brzezicki - drums, percussion

Production

- Steve Lillywhite - producer
- Will Gosling - engineer

Other

- Brian Aris - sleeve photography
- Grant-Edwards Management - management
