= Steeltown =

Studio album by Big Country
- Released: 19 October 1984
- Recorded: March–July 1984
- Studio: Polar Studios (Stockholm); RAK Studios (London)
- Genre: Alternative rock, new wave, Celtic rock
- Length: 47:54
- Label: Mercury
- Producer: Steve Lillywhite

Big Country chronology
The Crossing (1983)	Steeltown (1984)	The Seer (1986)

Singles from Steeltown
- 1. "East of Eden" Released: 21 September 1984; 2. "Where the Rose Is Sown" Released: 16 November 1984; 3. "Just a Shadow" Released: 11 January 1985

Steeltown is the second studio album by Scottish band Big Country. The album was recorded at ABBA's Polar Studios in Stockholm with Steve Lillywhite producing. It was released on 19 October 1984, in the UK and 29 October 1984, in the United States. It was released on CD only in Germany, as well as remastered and reissued there.

Steeltown is the band's only UK number 1 album, topping the chart for 1 week in October 1984. The title track "Steeltown" was written about the town of Corby, telling how many Scots went to work at the Stewarts & Lloyds steelworks when it opened in 1935, at the height of the Great Depression, but later found themselves unemployed when the steelworks closed in May 1980.

The 1996 reissue contains all of the B-sides from the album's single releases as well as the extended version of non-album single "Wonderland".

"East of Eden" was the only Top 20 single from the album, reaching number 17 in the UK Singles Chart.

== Reception ==
Professional ratings
Review scores
Source	Rating
AllMusic	3/5 stars
Rolling Stone	4/5 stars
Martin C. Strong	7/10

Critic Fred Schruers of Rolling Stone gave the album a glowing review, writing:

Clanging and crackling with energy, this second album from Big Country rings natural evolutionary changes on the band's stirring twin-guitar sound even as it frames still better news: bandleader Stuart Adamson has rapidly matured into a songwriter capable of bringing meticulous craft to his obvious passion.

Some critics reacted negatively towards the album, calling it muddled and overly dense. The album's relative failure has been attributed to the fact that many American and international fans couldn't relate to its themes and lyrics, which dealt with the misfortunes of Scottish workers and contained references to British politics. However, many fans today consider Steeltown to be the band's finest work.

James Dean Bradfield from Manic Street Preachers has cited the album as being one of his all-time favourites.

== Track listing ==
All lyrics are written by Stuart Adamson; all music is composed by Adamson, Mark Brzezicki, Tony Butler, and Bruce Watson, except where indicated.

=== Side one ===
1. "Flame of the West" – 5:01
2. "East of Eden" – 4:29
3. "Steeltown" – 4:39
4. "Where the Rose Is Sown" – 4:58
5. "Come Back to Me" – 4:35

=== Side two ===
6. "Tall Ships Go" – 4:38
7. "Girl with Grey Eyes" – 4:47
8. "Rain Dance" – 4:19
9. "The Great Divide" – 4:50
10. "Just a Shadow" – 5:38

=== 1996 reissue bonus tracks ===
11. "Bass Dance" – 1:39
12. "Belief in the Small Man" – 5:17
13. "Prairie Rose" (Bryan Ferry, Phil Manzanera) – 4:46
14. "Wonderland" (12" version) – 7:07
15. "Winter Sky" (Adamson, Watson) – 3:16

=== 2014 30th anniversary deluxe edition – disc 2 ===
1. "Wonderland”
2. "Giant”
3. "All Fall Together"
4. "East of Eden" (radio edit)
5. "Prairie Rose" (Ferry, Manzanera)
6. "Where the Rose Is Sown" (radio edit)
7. "Belief in the Small Man"
8. "Bass Dance"
9. "Just a Shadow" (radio edit)
10. "Winter Sky" (Adamson, Watson)
11. "Wonderland" (work in progress #1)
12. "Wonderland" (work in progress #2)
13. "East of Eden" (rough mix)
14. "Tall Ships Go" (rough mix)
15. "Where the Rose Is Sown" (rough mix)
16. "Come Back to Me" (rough mix)
17. "Bass Concerto" (work in progress)
- Tracks 11–17 are previously unreleased.

== Personnel ==
Big Country

- Stuart Adamson – vocals, guitar, EBow
- Mark Brzezicki – drums, percussion
- Tony Butler – bass, vocals
- Bruce Watson – guitar, EBow, mandolin

Technical

- Steve Lillywhite – producer
- Will Gosling – engineer
- Jeremy Bird – sleeve design
- Brian Aris – photography

Bonus tracks

- "All Fall Together" produced by Big Country; mixed by Jimmy Iovine.
- "Winter Sky" recorded at Impulse Studios, Edinburgh, 1–2 December 1984. Produced by Stuart Adamson and Bruce Watson; engineered by Lawrence Riva.

== Charts ==
Chart (1984)	Peak position
Australian Albums Chart	68
Canadian Albums Chart	53
Dutch Albums Chart	33
Finnish Albums (Suomen virallinen lista)	24
German Albums Chart	53
New Zealand Albums Chart	15
Norwegian Albums Chart	12
Swedish Albums Chart	28
UK Albums Chart	1
US Billboard 200	70

== Certifications ==
Organization	Level	Date
BPI – UK	Gold	17 October 1984
