= East of Eden (Big Country song) =

Single by Big Country

from the album Steeltown
- Released: 21 September 1984 (UK)
- Length: 4:10
- Label: Mercury
- Songwriters: Stuart Adamson; Mark Brzezicki; Tony Butler; Bruce Watson
- Producer: Steve Lillywhite

Big Country singles chronology
"Wonderland" (1984)	"East of Eden" (1984)	"Where the Rose Is Sown" (1984)

"East of Eden" is a song by Scottish rock band Big Country, which was released in 1984 as the lead single from their second studio album Steeltown. It was written by Big Country and produced by Steve Lillywhite. "East of Eden" reached No. 17 in the UK, and No. 12 in Ireland.

== Background ==
Speaking to Number One in 1984, Adamson said of the song: "It's a questioning song, a song about always having to look for any hope or inspiration." A music video was filmed in Glasgow to promote the single, directed by Mike Brady. The single's B-side, "Prairie Rose", is a cover of the 1974 song by Roxy Music.

== Critical reception ==
Upon release, Karen Swayne of Number One said: ""East of Eden" is as powerful and majestic as anything they've done." Vici MacDonald of Smash Hits commented: "The production on this record is truly awful. The instruments blur into one muddy, thrashing mass, completely submerging any hapless tune which might be struggling to escape."

== Track listing ==
7" single

1. "East of Eden" - 4:10
2. "Prairie Rose" - 4:50

12" single

1. "East of Eden (Extended Version)" - 6:22
2. "East of Eden" - 4:24
3. "Prairie Rose" - 4:44

12" single (US promo)

1. "East of Eden" - 4:09
2. "East of Eden" - 4:09

== Chart performance ==
Chart (1984)	Peak position
Irish Singles Chart	12
New Zealand Singles Chart	41
UK Singles Chart	17

== Personnel ==
Big Country

- Stuart Adamson - vocals, guitar
- Bruce Watson - guitar
- Tony Butler - bass
- Mark Brzezicki - drums, percussion

Production

- Steve Lillywhite - producer
- Will Gosling - engineer

Other

- Jeremy Bird - sleeve design
- Brian Aris - sleeve photography
- Grant-Edwards Management - management
