= Hold the Heart =

Single by Big Country

from the album The Seer
- B-side: "Honky Tonk Women"
- Released: 21 November 1986
- Length: 6:06
- Label: Mercury
- Songwriter(s): Stuart Adamson
- Producer(s): Robin Millar

Big Country singles chronology
"One Great Thing" (1986)	"Hold the Heart" (1986)	"King of Emotion" (1988)

"Hold the Heart" is a song by Scottish rock band Big Country, released in 1986 as the fourth and final single from their third studio album The Seer. It was written by Stuart Adamson and produced by Robin Millar. "Hold the Heart" reached number 55 in the UK Singles Chart and remained in the top 100 for two weeks.

== Background ==
Speaking to Smash Hits in 1986, Adamson said of the song, "It must have been almost a year and a half ago that I wrote it. It was the third song I wrote for the LP. I remember thinking I wanted to write a very ballady song, something that people would never think of as a Big Country song, a very direct boy/girl lost and found song."

== Critical reception ==
On its release, Jane Wilkes of Record Mirror commented, "In the absence of chest thumping, medieval imagery and vomit provoking gallantry, Stuart Adamson and co don't sound too bad. A mellow anthem depicting lost love, that retains its Celtic identity without wallowing in its grossest qualities." Max Bell of Number One praised the song but questioned its chances at commercial success, writing, "Big Country are searching hard for the formula that worked so well for them two years ago. They may seek in vain with 'Hold the Heart' despite a convincing group performance and Adamson's best vocal and lyric in ages. Undeniably a powerful and moving song but it's tear jerking intensity doesn't suggest immediate consumption."

In a review of The Seer, Peter Smith of the Tampa Bay Times remarked that the song is "almost a conventional pop love song". He continued, "The narrator is hopeless and helpless in a grip of a passion that he didn't understand until its source was taken from him." Eric Schafer of the Press & Sun-Bulletin praised it as "one of the most complex and perceptive love songs I've ever heard". He added, "In short, this is one of our smartest and most sincere bands. Why then, isn't it huge in the U.S.?"

== Track listing ==
7-inch single

1. "Hold the Heart" – 5:34
2. "Honky Tonk Women" (Live) – 3:54

12-inch single

1. "Hold the Heart" – 6:06
2. "Honky Tonk Women" (Live) – 3:54
3. "Hold the Heart" (Instrumental) – 6:06

2x 12-inch single (UK limited edition release)

1. "Hold the Heart" – 6:06
2. "Honky Tonk Women" (Live) – 3:54
3. "The Big Country Interview" (Part One) – 6:18
4. "The Big Country Interview" (Part Two) – 8:04

== Personnel ==
Big Country

- Stuart Adamson – vocals, guitar
- Bruce Watson – guitar, sitar
- Tony Butler – bass, backing vocals
- Mark Brzezicki – drums, percussion, backing vocals

Production

- Robin Millar – producer of "Hold the Heart"
- Walter Turbitt – additional production and mixing on "Hold the Heart"
- Virgin Vision – recording of "Honky Tonk Women" at the Pier, New York, 1986
- Dave Batchelor – mixing on "Honky Tonk Women"

== Charts ==
Chart (1986)	Peak position
UK Singles Chart	55
