= One in a Million (Big Country album) =

Compilation album by Big Country
- Released: 24 July 2001
- Genre: Alternative rock, celtic rock
- Label: Track

Big Country chronology
Driving to Damascus (1999)	One in a Million (2001)	John Wayne's Dream (2002)

One in a Million is an album released by Big Country in 2001. It had been recorded live in various venues between 1993 and 1995.

== Track listing ==
1. "One in a Million" (5:20)
2. "Long Way Home" (4:47)
3. "King of Emotion" (3:46)
4. "All Go Together" (3:15)
5. "Post Nuclear Talking Blues" (3:01)
6. "You Dreamer" (4:09)
7. "I'm Not Ashamed" (3:45)
8. "Peace in Our Time" (3:01)
9. "Just a Shadow" (3:05)
10. "Thirteen Valleys" (4:44)
11. "The Storm" (4:25)
12. "Magic in Your Eyes" (2:58)
13. "In a Big Country" (3:34)
14. "Daystar" (5:42)
15. "I'm on This Train" (5:08)
16. "Ships" (3:28)
17. "We're Not in Kansas" (5:23)
