= The Teacher (Big Country song) =

Single by Big Country

from the album The Seer
- B-side: "Home Came the Angels"
- Released: 13 June 1986
- Length: 4:07
- Label: Mercury
- Songwriter: Stuart Adamson
- Producer: Robin Millar

Big Country singles chronology
"Look Away" (1986)	"The Teacher" (1986)	"One Great Thing" (1986)

"The Teacher" is a song by Scottish rock band Big Country, released on 13 June 1986 as the second single from their third studio album, The Seer (1986). It was written by Stuart Adamson and was produced by Robin Millar. "The Teacher" reached No. 28 in the UK, and No. 14 in Ireland. A music video was filmed to promote the single.

== Critical reception ==
Upon its release, Jack Barron of Sounds remarked, "This begins like a modern day Shadows, falls into a lyrical tantrum about needing to know about the bond between the land and the sky, and is suddenly attacked by guitars wearing kilts and playing porridge." Duncan Wright of Smash Hits commented, "Another very Scottish guitar anthem, monstrously epic and a definite case of Adamson taking himself too seriously once again. Big Country sound as though they've just wheeled out another ode to their own majestic tediousness." In a review of one of the band's 1986 concerts in Los Angeles, Sharon Liveten of Billboard stated that the song was "transformed from a typical, anthemic, Scottish-sounding Big Country tune into a melange of psychedelic/metal/folk guitars".

== Track listing ==
7" single

1. "The Teacher" - 4:07
2. "Home Came the Angels" - 2:27

12" single

1. "The Teacher (Mystery Mix)" - 5:40
2. "Home Came the Angels" - 2:27
3. "The Teacher (7" Mix)" - 4:07

12" single (UK release)

1. "The Teacher (Mystery Mix)" - 5:40
2. "Restless Natives The Soundtrack Part 2" - 18:08

== Chart performance ==
Chart (1986)	Peak position
Irish Singles Chart	14
UK Singles Chart	28

== Personnel ==
Big Country

- Stuart Adamson - vocals, guitar
- Bruce Watson - guitar
- Tony Butler - bass, backing vocals
- Mark Brzezicki - drums, percussion, backing vocals

Production

- Robin Millar - producer of "The Teacher"
- Walter Turbitt - additional production and mixing on "The Teacher" and "The Teacher (Mystery Mix)"
- Geoff Emerick - producer of "Home Came the Angels" and "Restless Natives The Soundtrack Part 2"
