= Harvest Home (song) =

Single by Big Country

from the album The Crossing
- Released: 17 September 1982 (UK)
- Recorded: June 1982
- Studio: AIR Studios, London
- Genre: Celtic rock
- Length: 3:47
- Label: Mercury
- Songwriters: Stuart Adamson, Bruce Watson, Mark Brzezicki, Tony Butler
- Producer: Chris Thomas

Big Country singles chronology
| "Harvest Home" (1982) | "Fields of Fire" (1983) |

"Harvest Home" is the debut single of the Scottish band Big Country. It was first released as a single on 17 September 1982, then re-recorded for the band's debut album The Crossing.

== Debut release ==
In early 1982, a newly formed Big Country declined a trade agreement with the Ensign label but later signed a recording contract with Mercury-Phonogram Records. The band went to London to begin work on their upcoming debut album with producer Chris Thomas. However, the band felt Thomas was not fully committing to the band due to his other production duties, and eventually, the entire recording session was scrapped. Late that year, they issued "Harvest Home", one of three tracks salvaged from the sessions. In early 1983, Steve Lillywhite replaced Thomas as the band's producer. Despite missing a place in the UK Singles Chart, the band shortly after supported the Jam, on their sell-out farewell tour.

== Critical reception ==
Upon its release as a single, Gavin Martin of the NME remarked that "the sound – dour declamations over an ugly spartan beat – the mouth-full-of-gobstopper vocals and the strident upper register lead guitar do battle to the fatuous, brittle end". In their album review of The Crossing, Rolling Stone said that the "bagpipelike single-string riffs on such crackling tracks as" the "grandly martial Harvest Home are a nonstop, spine-tingling delight."

== Music video ==
At the beginning of the music video, the members of the band are shown having a picnic together in the bushes. They later abandon the picnic area and enter a large building. Their musical instruments are inside, and the band walk in and start playing their instruments inside this building. Towards the end of the video, lead vocalist Stuart Adamson puts down his instrument and starts dancing.

== Track listing ==
All tracks are credited to Stuart Adamson on the original single release. On The Crossing, "Harvest Home" is credited to Adamson, Bruce Watson, Mark Brzezicki and Tony Butler. (Note: The ASCAP song database lists Stuart Adamson as both the sole songwriter of "Harvest Home" and as co-songwriter with Bruce Watson and former Big Country members Pete Wishart and Clive Parker-Sharp. On the 2012 deluxe edition of The Crossing, "Harvest Home", "Balcony" and "Flag of Nations (Swimming)" are credited to Adamson and Watson.)

7" vinyl

1. "Harvest Home" – 3:45
2. "Balcony" – 3:57

12" vinyl

1. "Harvest Home" – 3:45
2. "Balcony" – 3:57
3. "Flag of Nations (Swimming)" – 4:38

== Personnel ==
Big Country

- Stuart Adamson – vocals, guitar
- Bruce Watson – guitar, backing vocals
- Tony Butler – bass, backing vocals
- Mark Brzezicki – drums, backing vocals

Technical

- Chris Thomas – producer
- Bill Price – engineer
- Davies and Starr – photography

== Charts ==
| Year | Chart | Peak position |
|---|---|---|
| 1982 | UK Singles (OCC) | 91 |
