= The Journey (Big Country album) =

Studio album by Big Country
- Released: 8 April 2013
- Recorded: September 2012–January 2013 in Wrexham
- Genres: Alternative rock, Celtic rock
- Label: Cherry Red
- Producer: Big Country

Big Country chronology
Driving to Damascus (1999)	The Journey (2013)

The Journey is the ninth studio album by Scottish rock band Big Country, released on 8 April 2013 through Cherry Red Records. The Journey is the first and only Big Country album with The Alarm vocalist Mike Peters taking over for the late Stuart Adamson, who died on 16 December 2001 at the age of 43, and former Simple Minds bassist Derek Forbes replacing Tony Butler, who retired in 2012. It is also the first album to feature Jamie Watson, who joins his father Bruce Watson on guitar. The elder Watson along with drummer Mark Brzezicki are the sole remaining members of the band's classic lineup present on this album.

== Background and recording ==
Stuart Adamson reportedly gave his blessing to Mike Peters fronting the band should they ever tour again, ruling himself out of the equation as he pursued his own interests after settling in Nashville. After his passing, the three surviving members initially reunited as a trio with Tony Butler assuming lead vocals for their 25th anniversary tour, releasing a live album in 2007. In December 2010, Bruce Watson officially asked Peters to join the band for their upcoming 30th anniversary tour. By this time, Jamie Watson had followed in his father's footsteps by joining him on guitar. In 2011, the band released the song "Another Country", their first single with Peters and the younger Watson. Tony Butler gracefully retired from the band in 2012, passing his duties onto Derek Forbes, who had recently been voted Scotland's Greatest Ever Bassist by the readers of Dear Scotland, and in the words of Butler himself "plays a mean D." Coincidentally, Adamson had been voted Scotland's Greatest Ever Guitarist by readers of Dear Scotland just a few weeks prior to Forbes receiving his honor as greatest bassist.

Recording for this album took place in an old Cold War bunker located in the Welsh border town of Wrexham, with eight-feet thick walls and no phone or Internet signal. Bruce Watson provided some insights into the recording as well as the band's transition with Peters assuming the role of singer and lyricist in an interview with PopMatters:

The difference between Mike and Stuart is that Stuart was a guitar player who sang, Mike’s a singer who plays guitar. I told Mike that this was the process that we always used. He said he’s never done it that way, but we should do it that way if that’s the way you always did it. And he enjoyed that process. Basically, the musicians would go into the studio and Mike would come in, sit, and work on his melodies and take notes. The next day he would come back, just like Stuart, and he would have his lyrics and melodies all done.

Watson went on to say that Peters was the only person he would have asked to take on this task:

If Mike had said no, I thought we would just do it with the original members and play a couple of conventions here and there. Mike’s approach to the whole thing has been absolutely amazing. I didn’t expect him to go that far with it.

== Critical reception ==
Professional ratings
Aggregate scores
Source	Rating
Metacritic	61/100
Review scores
Source	Rating
AllMusic	3/5 stars
Liverpool Sound and Vision	9/10
MusicOMH	3/5 stars
Record Collector	3/5 stars
Shields Gazette	7/10

This album has received mixed reviews from music critics. AllMusic staff writer Stephen Thomas Erlewine gave the album three out of five stars, writing, "It's not fun but it's not meant to be: it's a bunch of lifers in their middle age reconnecting with the things they found important back then." MusicOMH author Graeme Marsh also gave the album three out of five stars, describing it as "on a par with some of their earlier work, probably surpassing 1988’s Peace in Our Time."

Though Jeffrey X. Martin of Popshifter writes that he wishes the band would change their name, he concludes, "The Journey grows on you, more endearing with each listen and, as we approach the mid-point of the year, it’s the best new album I’ve heard so far." Colin Someville of The Scotsman was less enthused, commenting "the band had an inspirational sound and spirit through the most dire of circumstances, but perhaps now would be good time to move away from the memories." Alan Morrison of The Herald also panned the album, describing the songs as "unforgivably poor, weighed down by middle-aged rock clichés in words and music." However, Ian D. Hall of Liverpool Sound and Vision graded the album 9 out of 10, writing it "befits the memory of the man sadly no longer with his fans and also cements the future for the rockers."

Joseph Kyle of The Big Takeover praised the band's selection of Peters to fill the void left by Adamson, calling him "the best man for the job." He concludes his review by writing, "The Journey is easily one of the best records of the year, a surprising return for a band no one expected to return, and a proud continuation of Stuart Adamson’s legacy."

Tim Peacock of Record Collector gave a similar impression, writing, "Only the most optimistic of diehard fans could have conceived of Big Country making a credible comeback over a decade after Stuart Adamson’s tragic death. Yet, with The Alarm’s Mike Peters taking centre-stage and Simple Minds bassist Derek Forbes adroitly subbing for Tony Butler, that’s just what these astutely reconstituted veterans have done with The Journey." Australian writer Sebastian Skeet wrote: "Without Adamson the band can never get close to their original power and influence. What makes this an album worth listening to is the care and love poured into it by the players themselves as they pay tribute to their lost singer."

== Track listing ==
All tracks written by Brzezicki, Butler, Peters, B. Watson and J. Watson, except where noted.

No.	Title	Writer(s)	Length
1.	"In a Broken Promise Land"		3:21
2.	"The Journey"		4:03
3.	"After the Flood"	Brzezicki, Forbes, Peters, B. Watson, J. Watson	3:36
4.	"Hurt"	Brzezicki, Forbes, Peters, B. Watson, J. Watson	3:41
5.	"Home of the Brave"	Brzezicki, Butler, Forbes, Peters, B. Watson, J. Watson	4:38
6.	"Angels & Promises"		3:12
7.	"Strong (All Through This Land)"		3:47
8.	"Last Ship Sails"		3:01
9.	"Another Country"		4:44
10.	"Return"		3:50
11.	"Winter Fire"		4:00
12.	"Hail & Farewell"	Brzezicki, Forbes, Peters, B. Watson, J. Watson	4:17

== Personnel ==
The album's credits and personnel can be obtained from the liner notes.

Big Country

- Mark Brzezicki - drums, percussion, backing vocals
- Derek Forbes - bass guitar, guitar theremin, keyboards, backing vocals
- Mike Peters - lead vocals, acoustic guitar
- Bruce Watson - guitar, stylophone, vacuum cleaner, e-bow
- Jamie Watson - guitar, mandolin, backing vocals

Technical personnel

- Produced by Big Country
- Engineered and mixed by Andrea Wright
- Mastered by Mike Cave
- Cover design by Jack Andrade
- Sleeve design by Helen Lonsdale-Robinson and Bru "Trowelhands" Watson
- Photography by Andy Labrow

Management

- Managed by Jack Andrade and Tom Vitorino
