= Casbah Club =

British mod rock band

- Origin: Finchley, London, England
- Genres: Rock, mod rock, hard rock
- Years active: 2004–present (on hiatus 2008–2020)
- Label: Stir Music
- Members: Simon Townshend; Paul Turner; Phil Palmer; Zak Starkey
- Past members: JJ Gilmour; Bruce Foxton; Bruce Watson; Mark Brzezicki
- Website: casbahclub.co.uk

Casbah Club is a British mod rock band formed in Finchley, London in 2004.

== Career ==
The band consisted of guitarist/vocalist Simon Townshend (brother of Pete Townshend and touring member of The Who), bassist Bruce Foxton (The Jam, Stiff Little Fingers), drummer Mark Brzezicki (Procol Harum, Big Country), and rhythm guitarist Bruce Watson (Big Country). Scottish singer JJ Gilmour sang with the band in its earliest incarnation; a live album entitled Eastworld from this period was released.

Watson left the band to concentrate on his work with Four Good Men prior to re-forming Big Country with Brzezicki and Tony Butler for a 25th anniversary tour in 2007.

Casbah Club's debut album, Venustraphobia, was released in June 2006. During that year they toured with The Who, wherein Simon Townshend played a support set as a member of Casbah Club before playing the headlining set as a member of The Who.

As of September 2008, Casbah Club has been on hiatus as Townshend continues to tour with The Who and Bruce Foxton tours with From The Jam. Bruce Watson and Mark Brzezizki currently record and tour with the reformed Big Country.

== Band members ==
=== Current members ===
- Simon Townshend – lead vocals, lead guitar, keyboards (2006–2008, 2020–present)
- Phil Palmer – rhythm guitar, backing vocals (2020–present)
- Paul Turner – bass (2020–present)
- Zak Starkey – drums (2020–present)

=== Past members ===
- Bruce Foxton – bass (2004–2008)
- Bruce Watson – guitar, backing vocals (2004–2008)
- Mark Brzezicki – drums, Percussion (2004–2008)
- JJ Gilmour – lead vocals (2004–2006)

== Discography ==
- Eastworld (2004)
- Venustraphobia (2006)
