= Chance (Big Country song) =

Single by Big Country

from the album The Crossing
- Released: 26 August 1983
- Recorded: 1983
- Genre: Celtic rock
- Label: Mercury
- Songwriters: Stuart Adamson, Mark Brzezicki, Tony Butler, Bruce Watson
- Producer: Steve Lillywhite

Big Country singles chronology
"In a Big Country" (1983)	"Chance" (1983)	"Wonderland" (1983)

"Chance" is the fourth single from Scottish rock band Big Country's debut album, The Crossing.

== Chart positions ==
Chart (1983–1984)	Peak position
UK Singles Chart	9
Belgium (Flanders)	14
Netherlands (Dutch Top 40)	14
New Zealand	18

== Credits ==
- Music and lyrics: Stuart Adamson, Bruce Watson, Mark Brzezicki, Tony Butler
- Production: Steve Lillywhite
