= Fields of Fire (song) =

Single by Big Country

from the album The Crossing
- Released: 18 February 1983
- Recorded: 1982–1983
- Genre: Celtic rock
- Length: 3:31
- Label: Mercury
- Songwriters: Stuart Adamson, Mark Brzezicki, Tony Butler, Bruce Watson
- Producer: Steve Lillywhite

Big Country singles chronology
"Harvest Home" (1982)	"Fields of Fire" (1983)	"In a Big Country" (1983)

"Fields of Fire" (single version subtitled "400 Miles") is one of the biggest hits by the Scottish rock band Big Country. It was first released in the United Kingdom in 1983 as the second single from the band's debut album The Crossing.

== Music video ==
The music video begins with a young boy playing with his toy train set. The members of the band are passengers on a train that has left the railway station and are seen playing their instruments inside their train coach. After going through a tunnel, the train is stopped because a Scotsman is playing the bagpipes on the railway line. The band then leave their carriage and follow the Scotsman to find themselves watching a First World War battle in which the band members themselves are taking part.

== Reception ==
The song was a big hit, introducing the band to mainstream audiences in the United States in 1984 and reaching the top ten in the UK Singles Chart. On their album review of The Crossing, Rolling Stone noted that the song was "one of the great, resounding anthems of this or any other year" and praised the "bagpipelike single-string riffs". Big Country's bassist Tony Butler has also claimed this song to be one of his favourites.

Chas de Whalley of Kerrang! praised "Fields of Fire" as a "reeling rocker" which "whirls by on dervish duelling guitars and a bouncing, bouldering beat". He added that the B-side, "Anglepark", was "another ace track". Cash Box said that "a nod to the homeland discernable in the repetition of a familiar Scottish folk theme in the guitar instrumental segments again positions this band’s offering in its own musical territory."

== Chart positions ==
Chart (1983–1984)	Peak position
New Zealand Singles Chart	26
UK Singles Chart	10
U.S. Billboard Hot 100	52

== Credits ==
- Music and lyrics: Stuart Adamson, Bruce Watson, Mark Brzezicki, Tony Butler
- Production: Steve Lillywhite

== Compilation album usage ==
The song has been included on several notable compilation albums since its release. For instance, in 1992, the track was included on the Time Life:The Rock Collection-Hot Rock release, and in 1997, the long-running The Best... Album in the World...Ever! compilation album brand included the song on their The Best Scottish Album in the World... Ever! release.
