= The Crossing (Big Country album) =

Studio album by Big Country
- Released: 29 July 1983
- Recorded: June 1982, January & May 1983
- Studios: The Manor (Oxfordshire); RAK (London)
- Genres: Alternative rock; new wave; folk rock; Celtic rock; post-punk
- Length: 48:24
- Label: Mercury
- Producer: Steve Lillywhite

Big Country chronology
| The Crossing (1983) | Steeltown (1984) |

Singles from The Crossing
- 1. "Harvest Home" Released: 17 September 1982; 2. "Fields of Fire" Released: 18 February 1983; 3. "In a Big Country" Released: 20 May 1983; 4. "Chance" Released: 26 August 1983

The Crossing is the debut album by Scottish band Big Country, released in July 1983. The album reached number three in the United Kingdom; overseas, it hit number four in Canada on the RPM national Top Albums Chart and number 18 in the United States on the Billboard 200 in 1983. It went on to be certified platinum in the UK and Canada. It contains the song "In a Big Country" which is their only US top 40 hit single.

== Background ==
In May 1982, Big Country signed a recording contract with Phonogram and soon began recording what was supposed to be their debut album with producer Chris Thomas. However, the entire recording session would eventually be scrapped when Big Country felt Thomas was not fully committing to the band due to other production commitments. Three songs were salvaged from the sessions – "Harvest Home", "Balcony" and "Flag of Nations (Swimming)" – and released as the "Harvest Home" single in September 1982 through Phonogram's imprint Mercury Records, reaching number 91 on the UK Singles Chart.

With new producer Steve Lillywhite, the band recorded the single "Fields of Fire" in early 1983, which became a UK top ten hit. In May, on the back of the single's success, Lillywhite and the band proceeded to record The Crossing, which would include a re-recorded "Harvest Home".

Stuart Adamson and fellow guitarist Bruce Watson used the MXR Pitch Transposer 129 effect pedal to create a guitar sound reminiscent of bagpipes. Also contributing to the band's unique sound was their use of the EBow, a hand-held device which, through the use of magnets, causes the strings of an electric guitar to vibrate, producing a soft attack which sounds more like strings or a synthesizer.

The album cover for The Crossing was released in three different colours: blue, red, and green, with smooth or textured finish. The specific colour variations often corresponded to different international regions, the earliest UK/Australasian pressings typically arriving in blue, and specialised releases or later pressings arriving in red or green.

The album has been remastered and reissued on three occasions. The latest version released by Universal in 2012 in advance of the album's 30th anniversary includes a second disc of previously unissued demos. Also included in the set are tracks produced by Chris Thomas from the first abortive attempt to record the band's debut album. The demos include the earliest recordings done by Adamson and Watson, some of which were recorded on four-track prior to recruiting either a drummer or bassist for the band.

The set also includes a booklet with interviews (new in the case of the current band members and archived in the case of the late Stuart Adamson) by the journalist and author Tim Barr. Lyrics for all of the key songs are also included, and the album was remastered by Paschal Byrne from the original master tapes. In total, ten previously unreleased tracks were included in the deluxe, digitally remastered edition.

== Music and lyrics ==
The songs on The Crossing deal with topics including loss ("Inwards", "Chance"), separation ("Close Action"), dehumanization ("Lost Patrol"), and the 1745 Jacobite rebellion ("The Storm"). Many of the songs are characterized by Mark Brzezicki's highly-compressed drums and the heavily effects-treated, layered guitars of Adamson and Watson. The music often demonstrates a clear influence of Scottish traditional music, particularly obvious in the pipe-band rhythms of "In a Big Country" and "Fields of Fire" and the swirling, Gaelic guitar intro to "The Storm". This caused the band to be categorized as a Celtic rock band, which sometimes led to unfavorable comparisons with other bands such as Thin Lizzy.

== Reception ==
Professional ratings
Review scores
| Source | Rating |
|---|---|
| AllMusic | 4/5 stars |
| Blender | 4/5 stars |
| Classic Rock | 10/10 |
| Q | 4/5 stars |
| Record Mirror | 4/5 stars |
| Rolling Stone | 4/5 stars |
| The Rolling Stone Album Guide | 4/5 stars |
| Smash Hits | 4/10 |
| Sounds | 4.5/5 stars |
| The Village Voice | B |

In a glowing review for Sounds, Johnny Waller found that Big Country had developed their own "uniquely recognisable" musical style and said that their "spirit and determination ... have a ring of truth and integrity", concluding that his "slight reservations about The Crossing are ultimately cut through with the lionheart vigour of a major new band only slightly in too much of a hurry." Writing that "Stuart Adamson always manages to use his taut vocals to good effect", Simon Hills of Record Mirror considered The Crossing, "if a little one dimensional", to be "a worthy debut album" and "all in all sterling stuff".

Kurt Loder commented in Rolling Stone that Big Country "blows the knobs off all the synth-pop diddlers and fake-funk frauds who are cluttering up the charts these days", with "an air-raid guitar sound that's unlike anything else around, anywhere". "Like the Irish band U2 (with whom they share young, guitar-wise producer Steve Lillywhite)," Loder noted, "Big Country has no use for synthesizers, and their extraordinary twin-guitar sound should make The Crossing a must-own item for rock die-hards."

== Track listings ==
All songs written by Stuart Adamson, Mark Brzezicki, Tony Butler, and Bruce Watson, except as indicated. On the US vinyl LP, the songs "1000 Stars" and "Fields of Fire" are in reversed order. The US CD release keeps the same order as below.

Side one

1. "In a Big Country" – 4:44
2. "Inwards" – 4:36
3. "Chance" – 4:26
4. "1000 Stars" – 3:50
5. "The Storm" – 6:19

Side two

6. "Harvest Home" – 4:19
7. "Lost Patrol" – 4:52
8. "Close Action" – 4:15
9. "Fields of Fire (400 Miles)" – 3:31
10. "Porrohman" – 7:52

Additional tracks (cassette release)

1. "Angle Park" (Adamson, Watson) – 4:08
2. "Fields of Fire (400 Miles)" (Alternative Mix) (listed as '12" Mix') – 5:19
3. "Heart and Soul" – 5:13
4. "In a Big Country" (Pure Mix) (listed as '12" Mix') – 6:19

=== Wonderland EP (US, 1984) ===
1. "Wonderland" – 3:56
2. "All Fall Together" – 5:05
3. "Angle Park" (Adamson, Watson) – 4:07
4. "The Crossing" – 7:04

=== Wonderland EP (Canada, 1984) ===
1. "Wonderland" – 3:58
2. "Angle Park" (Adamson, Watson) – 4:08
3. "All Fall Together" – 5:16
4. "Chance" (Extended Re-Mix) – 6:10
5. "Heart and Soul" – 5:13
6. "The Crossing" – 7:10

=== Wonderland EP (US only, 2002) ===
Wonderland EP cover

1. "Wonderland" – 3:58
2. "All Fall Together" (Jimmy Iovine remix) – 5:16
3. "Angle Park" (Adamson, Watson) – 4:08
4. "The Crossing" – 7:10
5. "Chance" (re-recorded single version) – 4:37

=== 1996 re-issue bonus tracks ===
11. "Angle Park" (Adamson, Watson) – 4:08
12. "All of Us" – 4:09
13. "The Crossing" – 7:09
14. "Heart and Soul" – 4:33 (This version fades out earlier than the version on the 1983 cassette release)

=== 2012 30th anniversary deluxe edition ===
Disc 1 (bonus tracks)

11. "Balcony" (Adamson, Watson) (B-side of "Harvest Home") – 3:55
12. "Flag of Nations (Swimming)" (Adamson, Watson) (B-side of "Harvest Home" 12")
13. "Angle Park" (Adamson, Watson) (B-side of "Fields of Fire")
14. "All of Us" (B-side of "In a Big Country")
15. "Heart and Soul" (B-side of "In a Big Country" 12")
16. "The Crossing" (B-side of "Chance" 12")
17. "Tracks of My Tears" (live) (Smokey Robinson, Warren Moore, Marvin Tarplin) (B-side of "Chance")

Disc 2

1. "Angle Park" (4-track demo, 1981) (Adamson, Watson) *
2. "Harvest Home" (4-track demo, 1981)*
3. "We Could Laugh" (4-track demo, 1981) (Adamson, Watson)*
4. "In a Big Country" (demo, 1983)
5. "The Storm" (demo, 1983)
6. "Big City" (demo, 1983)
7. "Fields of Fire" (Riverside, BBC TV, 1983)*
8. "Lost Patrol" (demo, May 1982)*
9. "Inwards" (demo, May 1982)*
10. "1000 Stars" (Chris Thomas sessions, June 1982)*
11. "Lost Patrol" (Chris Thomas sessions, June 1982)*
12. "Inwards" (Chris Thomas sessions, June 1982)*
13. "Close Action" (Chris Thomas sessions, June 1982)*
14. "Fields of Fire" (demo, September 1982)
15. "1000 Stars" (demo, September 1982)
16. "Ring Out Bells" (demo, September 1982)
17. "Chance" (demo, September 1982)

== Personnel ==
Big Country

- Stuart Adamson – vocals, guitar, piano, e-bow
- Bruce Watson – guitar, e-bow, vocals
- Tony Butler – bass, vocals
- Mark Brzezicki – drums, percussion, vocals

with:

- Christine Beveridge – additional vocals

Technical

- Steve Lillywhite – producer
- Will Gosling – engineer
- Steve Chase – assistant engineer
- Mike Nocito – assistant engineer
- Julian Balme – sleeve
- Paul Cox – photography

== Production notes for deluxe edition bonus tracks ==
Disc 1

- Tracks 11–13 and 15 recorded in June 1982 at AIR Studios, London. Tracks 11, 12 and 15 produced by Chris Thomas, engineered by Bill Price; track 13 produced by Steve Churchyard and Big Country.
- Track 14 produced by Steve Lillywhite, Will Gosling and Big Country.
- Tracks 16 and 17 produced by Steve Lillywhite; track 17 recorded live on 4 July 1983 at Locarno Tiffany’s in Glasgow.

Disc 2

- Track 7 recorded at Riverside Studios, Hammersmith, for BBC2's Riverside; broadcast on 17 January 1983.
- Tracks 8 and 9 recorded by John Brandt in May 1982 at Phonogram Studio.
- Tracks marked with an asterisk (*) are previously unreleased.
- Tracks 4–6 and 14–17 were previously released on Rarities IV, 2003.

== Chart performance ==
Album

| Chart (1983) | Peak position |
|---|---|
| Australian Albums Chart | 21 |
| Canadian Albums Chart | 4 |
| Dutch Albums Chart | 11 |
| New Zealand Albums Chart | 8 |
| Swedish Albums Chart | 17 |
| UK Albums Chart | 3 |
| U.S. Billboard 200 | 18 |

Singles

| Year | Single | Chart | Position |
|---|---|---|---|
| 1982 | Harvest Home | UK Singles Chart | 91 |
| 1983 | Fields of Fire | UK Singles Chart | 10 |
| 1983 | In a Big Country | Billboard Hot Dance Music/Club Play | 37 |
| 1983 | In a Big Country | Billboard Mainstream Rock | 3 |
| 1983 | In a Big Country | Billboard Hot 100 | 17 |
| 1983 | In a Big Country | RPM 50 Singles (Canada) | 3 |
| 1983 | In a Big Country | UK Singles Chart | 17 |
| 1983 | Chance | UK Singles Chart | 9 |
| 1984 | Fields of Fire | Billboard Hot 100 | 52 |

== Certifications ==
| Organization | Level | Date |
|---|---|---|
| BPI – UK | Gold | 15 September 1983 |
| CRIA – Canada | Gold | 1 November 1983 |
| CRIA – Canada | Platinum | 1 December 1983 |
| RIAA – USA | Gold | 19 January 1984 |
| BPI – UK | Platinum | 9 February 1984 |
