= One Great Thing =

1986 single by Big Country

Single by Big Country

from the album The Seer
- Released: 5 September 1986
- Length: 4:00
- Label: Mercury
- Songwriters: Stuart Adamson, Tony Butler
- Producer: Walter Turbitt

Big Country singles chronology
"The Teacher" (1986)	"One Great Thing" (1986)	"Hold the Heart" (1986)

"One Great Thing" is the third single from Scottish band Big Country's third studio album, The Seer. The song reached No. 19 on the UK Singles Chart. A music video was shot for the song, featuring different people mouthing the lyrics to the song as well as shots of the group performing it on stage.

A rerecorded version of the song with altered lyrics was used in an advert for the Scottish brewers Tennent's.

== Critical reception ==
Upon its release, Kevin Murphy of Sounds stated, "Adamson and co march through another epic tale of crusading porridge. Just one further reason why Hadrian's Wall should be rebuilt."

== Charts ==
Chart (1986)	Peak position
Europe (European Hot 100 Singles)	57
Ireland (IRMA)	12
UK Singles (Official Charts)	19
