= On the Air (band) =

English rock band

On the Air were an English rock band formed in the late 1970s and were originally known as the Simon Townshend Band, and were based in the Ealing area of West London. It included Simon Townshend, Mark Brzezicki and Tony Butler.

They released their first single "Ready for Action" in 1980.

== Discography ==
=== Singles ===
- 1980: "Ready for Action"
- 1980: "Another Planet"
