= Just a Shadow =

1984 song performed by Big Country

Single by Big Country

from the album Steeltown
- Released: 11 January 1985
- Songwriter(s): Stuart Adamson, Mark Brzezicki, Tony Butler, and Bruce Watson

Big Country singles chronology
"Where the Rose Is Sown" (1984)	"Just a Shadow" (1985)	"Look Away" (1986)

"Just a Shadow" is a song by Scottish rock band Big Country on their 1984 album Steeltown. It was released as a single on 19 January 1985 and peaked at number 26 on the UK Singles Chart.

== Critical reception ==
On its release, Malcolm Dome of Kerrang! called it "sheer bliss on a social treadmill" and added, "Now this brings a beam to my cat's eyes. Big Country are inspirational as far as I'm concerned. They could record a version of 'Metal Thrashing Mad' and make it sound awesome." Mike Gardiner of Record Mirror was critical of the song, describing it as a "mediocre album track". He wrote, "The soaring guitars sound like their wings have been clipped and the chest the chorus is trying to swell probably has punctured lungs."
