= In a Big Country =

1983 song by Big Country

- UK and international 12-inch vinyl edition

Single by Big Country

from the album The Crossing
- B-side: "All of Us"
- Released: May 1983
- Genre: Alternative rock; new wave; Celtic rock
- Length: 4:44 (album version); 3:56 (single edit)
- Label: Mercury
- Songwriters: Stuart Adamson; Mark Brzezicki; Tony Butler; Bruce Watson
- Producer: Steve Lillywhite

Big Country singles chronology
"Fields of Fire" (1983)	"In a Big Country" (1983)	"Chance" (1983)

Music video
- "In a Big Country" on YouTube

"In a Big Country" is a song by Scottish rock band Big Country. It was released in May 1983 as the third single from their debut studio album The Crossing. The song reached No. 17 on both the UK Singles Chart and the Billboard Hot 100, No. 37 on the Billboard Dance/Disco Top 80, and No. 3 on the US Billboard Rock Top Tracks chart. In Canada, it reached No. 3 on the RPM 50 Singles chart.

== Composition ==
"In a Big Country" has been described as an alternative rock, new wave and Celtic rock song.

== Music video ==
The music video for the song received heavy airplay on MTV. Directed by Lindsey Clennell, it follows the four band members as they track down an unspecified treasure, while constantly being pursued and bested by a woman who appears to be a rival treasure-hunter.

The first half of the video follows the band as they ride through lush green fields on sports three-wheelers and a motorbike while the woman watches them through binoculars. The group soon locates a black box emblazoned with the band's logo and a map. What is inside the box is never shown. The opening scenes are filmed at the then-derelict Corfe Castle railway station including the 'down' platform shelter and show the ruins of Corfe Castle in the background. The station is now part of the restored Swanage Railway.

The woman lures them to her by starting a fire in a barn, the smoke drawing the band members' attention. She (unintentionally and comically) defeats all four with a single punch. They then consult their map and head off again.

The second half of the video takes place at sea in Swanage Bay. The band head towards Swanage Pier where they don wet suits and scuba gear and set out on a motorized inflatable raft. The woman, who has followed them, overtakes them on a jet ski. The band reach their destination at sea, but have apparently no luck in locating the treasure after attempting some underwater diving (however, since nobody in the band was actually scuba-certified, this meant having to stay on the surface).

The video concludes with the woman trapped on a small island surrounded by a cliff with a rescue fire burning. The band appears overhead and lead singer Stuart Adamson tosses a rope down the cliff edge. He and drummer Mark descend. Stuart and the woman embrace (perhaps revealing they knew each other and had an ongoing relationship/rivalry) while Mark discovers the black box floating amongst the seaweed in the inlet.

Interspersed throughout the video, in between the action, the band is shown in flannel shirts and blazers performing the song onstage. The video ends on this note, with Stuart dancing and the rest of the band playing.

== Reception ==
The Smashing Pumpkins' James Iha named the song to his "mixtape for dreamers," commenting, "I love this song. I used to watch the video when it was on MTV. When MTV played videos. ... The music is super-anthemic, the guitars are awesome and bagpipe-like, and it's somehow incorporating the band's name, that they're in a big country and then dreams stay with you like a lover's voice. It's sounds like Braveheart or something."

== Charts ==
=== Weekly charts ===
Charts (1983–1984)	Peak position
Australia (Kent Music Report)	7
Canada Top Singles (RPM)	3
Ireland (IRMA)	22
New Zealand (Recorded Music NZ)	34
UK Singles (Official Charts)	17
US Billboard Hot 100	17
US Rock Top Tracks (Billboard)	3

=== Year-end charts ===
Chart (1983)	Position
Canada Top Singles (RPM)	41

Chart (1984)	Position
Australia (Kent Music Report)	60

== American Authors version ==
"In a Big Country"

Single by American Authors
- Released: 19 April 2014
- Label: Island Def Jam
- Songwriters: Stuart Adamson; Mark Brzezicki; Tony Butler; Bruce Watson

American Authors singles chronology
"Luck" (2013)	"In a Big Country" (2014)	"Go Big or Go Home" (2015)

"In a Big Country" was covered by American alternative rock band American Authors. The song was recorded by the band for the 2014 split single "In a Big Country" / "You Make My Dreams Come True", with American alternative rock band the Mowgli's cover of Hall & Oates' "You Make My Dreams Come True". The single was released by Island Def Jam on vinyl on 19 April 2014 as a Record Store Day release. The track appeared as the A-side of the single. It charted on Billboard in 2014–2015.

=== Track listing ===
7-inch
No.	Title	Writer(s)	Length
1.	"In a Big Country" (performed by American Authors)	Stuart Adamson; Mark Brzezicki; Tony Butler; Bruce Watson
2.	"You Make My Dreams Come True" (performed by the Mowgli's)	Sara Allen; Daryl Hall; John Oates

=== Personnel ===
American Authors

- Zac Barnett – lead vocals, guitar
- James Adam Shelley – lead guitar, banjo
- Dave Rublin – bass
- Matt Sanchez – drums

=== Release history ===
Region	Date	Format	Label	Ref.
United States	19 April 2014	7-inch vinyl	Island Def Jam	
