= Carnegie Hall, Dunfermline =

Theatre in Dunfermline, Fife, Scotland

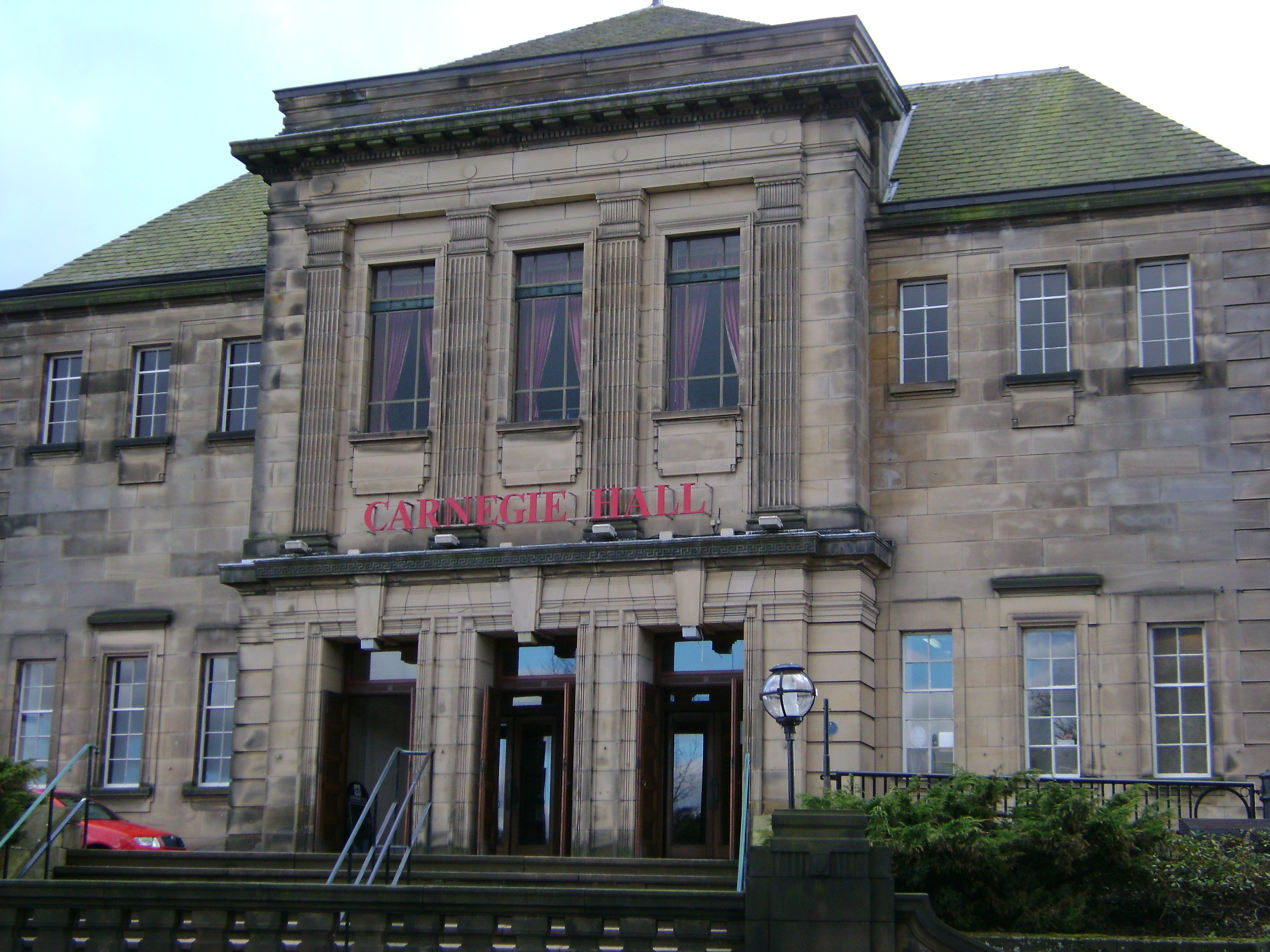

- Location within Scotland

General information
- Architectural style: Art Deco
- Coordinates: 56°04′19″N 3°27′13″W
- Opened: 1937

Carnegie Hall is an Art Deco theatre located in Dunfermline, Fife, Scotland. It was named after the industrialist and philanthropist Andrew Carnegie, who was born in Dunfermline. Designed by architects Muirhead and Rutherford, it was officially opened in 1937 and was designated a Category B listed building in 1993.

Billy Connolly recorded his 1976 album Atlantic Bridge at both at the Dunfermline theatre and at Carnegie Hall in New York.

The Music Institute, which is adjoined to Carnegie Hall, was once called Benachie House and was converted into the institute between 1933 and 1937. The original house dates from around 1865.
