= Look Away (Big Country song) =

Single by Big Country

from the album The Seer
- Released: 4 April 1986
- Length: 4:23
- Label: Mercury
- Songwriter: Stuart Adamson
- Producers: Robin Millar (single) & Walter Turbitt (album)

Big Country singles chronology
"Just a Shadow" (1985)	"Look Away" (1986)	"The Teacher" (1986)

"Look Away" is a song by Scottish rock band Big Country. It was released in April 1986 as the lead single from their third studio album, The Seer. It gave the group their highest-charting single on the UK Singles Chart, peaking at No. 7. "Look Away" was an even bigger success in Ireland, topping the Irish Singles Chart for one week.

The single version of the song was mixed by Robin Millar, but the album version was mixed by Walter Turbitt, as were all the other songs on the released version of The Seer.

== Inspiration ==
The lyrics to the song were inspired by the 1982 film Harry Tracy, Desperado, about the outlaw Harry Tracy.

== Charts ==
=== Weekly charts ===
Chart (1986)	Peak position
Australia (Kent Music Report)	24
Europe (European Hot 100 Singles)	27
Finland (Suomen virallinen lista)	7
Ireland (IRMA)	1
Netherlands (Dutch Top 40)	27
Netherlands (Single Top 100)	14
New Zealand (Recorded Music NZ)	11
South Africa (Springbok Radio)	11
Switzerland (Schweizer Hitparade)	18
UK Singles (Official Charts)	7
US Album Rock Tracks (Billboard)	5
West Germany (GfK)	19

=== Year-end charts ===
Chart (1986)	Position
UK Singles (OCC)	95
