= Big Country =

Scottish rock band

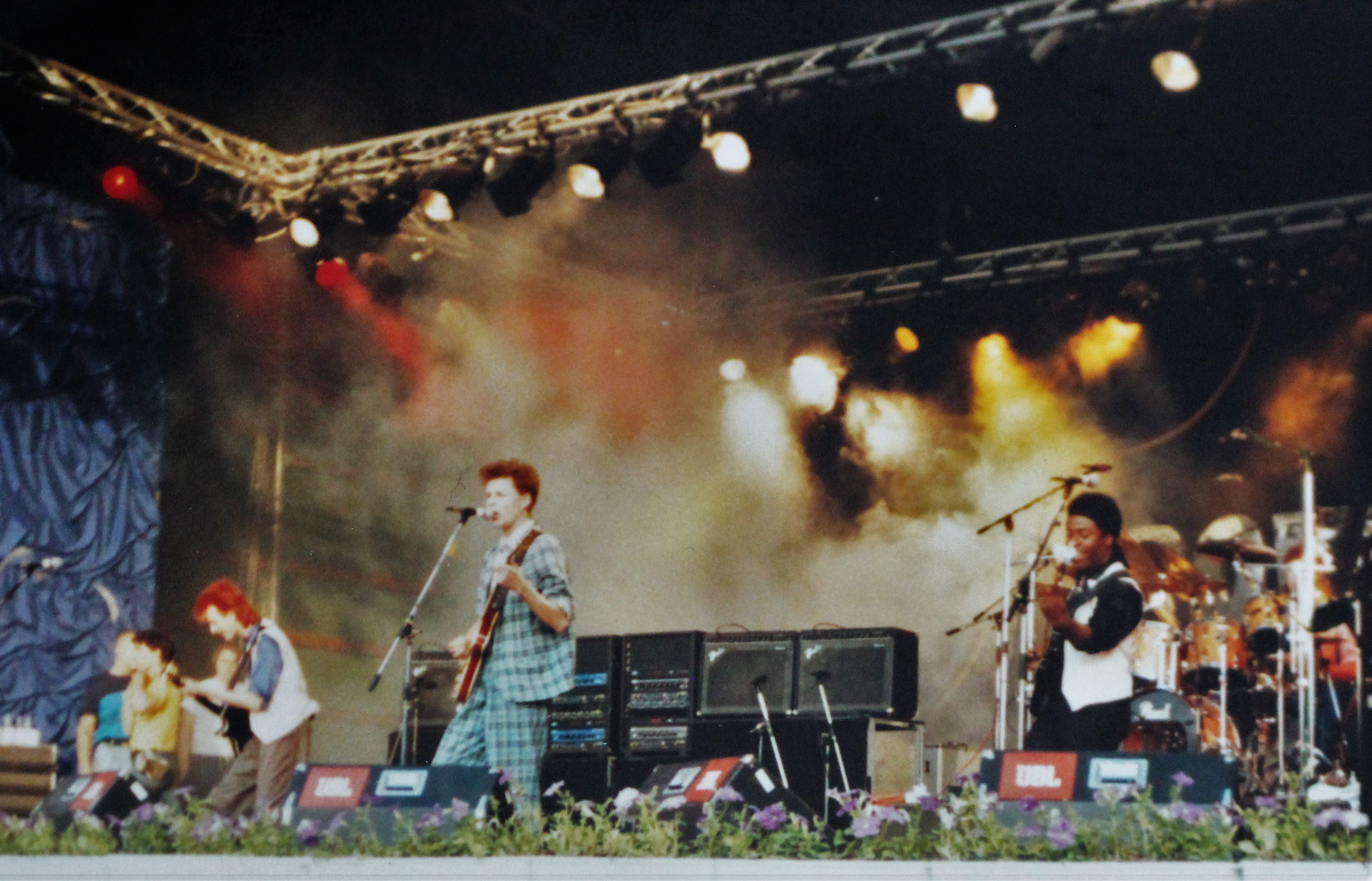
- Big Country, 1986 (L–R: Bruce Watson, Stuart Adamson, Tony Butler, Mark Brzezicki)

Background information
- Origin: Dunfermline, Fife, Scotland
- Genre: Celtic rock
- Works: Big Country discography
- Years active: 1981–2001; 2007; 2010–present
- Labels: Mercury; Track-BCR; Transatlantic; Giant/Reprise/Warner; Chrysalis
- Spinoffs: From Big Country
- Spinoff of: Skids
- Members: Bruce Watson; Jamie Watson; Tommie Paxton; Chris Stones; Reece Dobbin
- Past members: Stuart Adamson; Pete Wishart; Mark Brzezicki; Alan Wishart; Clive Parker; Tony Butler; Pat Ahern; Mike Peters; Derek Forbes; Scott Whitley; Simon Hough; Gil Allan

Big Country are a Scottish rock band formed in Dunfermline, Fife, in 1981. The band's 'classic' lineup consisted of lead singer and guitarist Stuart Adamson (formerly of the Skids), guitarist Bruce Watson, bassist Tony Butler and drummer Mark Brzezicki. Their debut album The Crossing (1983) reached number three in the UK and delivered their only U.S. Top 40 hit, "In a Big Country". Follow‑ups Steeltown (1984) and The Seer (1986) also landed in the UK top ten, with The Seer producing the Irish number one hit "Look Away" and featuring a collaboration with Kate Bush on its title track.

After Adamson's death by suicide in December 2001, the classic lineup disbanded. Surviving members reunited in 2007 for anniversary tours, later joined by singer Mike Peters and changing bassists, culminating in the 2013 album The Journey, their first new studio release in 14 years.

== Career ==
=== Formation ===
Big Country were initially a five-piece, composed of Stuart Adamson (formerly of Skids, vocals/guitar/keyboards) and Bruce Watson (guitar/mandolin/sitar/vocals), plus Peter Wishart (later of Runrig and now a Scottish National Party MP) on keyboards, his brother Alan on bass, and Clive Parker, drummer from Spizz Energi/Athletico Spizz '80. Adamson had initially wanted a band made up entirely of musicians from in or around his hometown of Dunfermline. In the early days, the band was called Angle Park, before settling on the name Big Country, which Adamson said implied 'a sense of vastness, open spaces'.

The band played live with Alice Cooper's Special Forces tour for two concerts in February 1982 at Brighton and Birmingham; Parker states that he and the Wishart brothers were asked to leave after the band was poorly received by Cooper's fans. Tony Butler (bass guitar/vocals) and Mark Brzezicki (drums/percussion/vocals), working under the name 'Rhythm for Hire,' were brought in to play on "Harvest Home." They hit it off with Adamson and Watson, who invited them to join the band.

=== Commercial success ===
Big Country's first single was "Harvest Home", recorded and released in 1982. It was a modest success, although it did not reach the UK Singles Chart. Their next single was 1983's "Fields Of Fire (400 Miles)", which reached the UK's Top Ten and was followed by the album The Crossing. The album was a hit in the United States (reaching the Top 20 in the Billboard 200), powered by "In a Big Country", their only US Top 40 single. The song uses heavily engineered guitar sounds, reminiscent of bagpipes. Adamson and fellow guitarist Watson achieved this through the use of the MXR Pitch Transposer 129 Guitar Effect. Also contributing to the band's sound was their use of an e-bow, a device which allows a guitar to sound more like strings or synthesizer. The Crossing sold over a million copies in the UK and obtained gold record status (sales of over 500,000) in the US. The band performed at the Grammy Awards and on Saturday Night Live.

Big Country released the non-LP extended play single "Wonderland" in 1984, while in the middle of a worldwide tour. The song, considered by some critics to be one of their finest, reached number 8 on the UK Singles Chart, but stopping at number 86 on the US Billboard Hot 100. It was the last single by the band to make the US charts.

Their second album Steeltown (1984) was a hit, entering the UK Albums Chart at number one. The album includes three UK top 30 hit singles, and received critical acclaim on both sides of the Atlantic, but it was a commercial disappointment in the US, peaking at number 70 on the Billboard album chart.

On Christmas 1984, the four members participated in the Band Aid charity record "Do They Know It's Christmas?". They are among the acts who contributed a spoken message to the B-side of the single.

Throughout 1984 and 1985 the band toured the UK, Europe, and to a lesser extent the US both as headliners and in support of such bigger-name artists as Queen and Roger Daltrey. They also provided the musical score to a Scottish independent film, Restless Natives (1985), which was released years later on the band's Restless Natives and Rarities (1998) collection. Members of Big Country had backed Roger Daltrey on his 1985 solo album Under a Raging Moon, and Tony Butler played bass and provided backing vocals on Pete Townshend's 1980 hit single "Let My Love Open the Door" and the Pretenders' 1982 hit single "Back On The Chain Gang". Both Butler and Brzezicki performed on Townshend's 1985 solo album White City: A Novel. Brzezicki played drums for The Cult on their 1985 Love album and was featured in the video for the single "She Sells Sanctuary".

1986's The Seer, the band's third album, was another success in the UK, peaking at number two. It produced three Top 30 singles, including the Irish number one hit "Look Away", which would also prove to be the band's biggest hit in the UK, peaking at number seven. Kate Bush provided backing vocals on the album's title track, and the album received good reviews from the music press. In the US, The Seer sold a little bit better than Steeltown, reaching number 59 on the Billboard chart.

In what some critics felt was a transparent attempt to bolster their dwindling US following, Big Country used producer Peter Wolf for their next album, Peace in Our Time (1988), which was recorded in Los Angeles. It reached number 9 in the UK Albums Chart, but sold poorly in the United States. The album launch took place in Moscow and was accompanied by a tour of the USSR, a political statement some felt was insincere. During the Peace in Our Time UK tour, the band were supported by Diesel Park West and Cry Before Dawn.

=== The 1990s ===
No Place Like Home, Big Country's fifth studio album, was released in 1991. It was a commercial flop, and as a result nearly broke up the band. Drummer Mark Brzezicki returned to the studio as a session drummer after leaving the band. The album found Big Country trying to reinvent themselves and their 1980s image. It was not released in America, although two re-recorded tracks showed up on 1993's The Buffalo Skinners.

In 1991, the band was dropped by Mercury and its distributor Phonogram, the companies that had released all of their material since 1983. From that point on, Big Country's status shrunk, popping up in the lower echelons of the charts in the UK and Europe with the release of every subsequent album. Only one of these, 1993's The Buffalo Skinners, received a major label release (via Chrysalis Records), serving as a return to form of sorts for the band, reaching the UK Top 25. The album produced two UK Top 30 singles in "Alone" and "Ships". In June 1995, Big Country released their seventh studio album, Why the Long Face.

1999 saw the release of Big Country's eighth and final studio album with Adamson at the helm, Driving to Damascus (titled in its slightly different, augmented US release John Wayne's Dream). Later that year, Adamson disappeared for a while before resurfacing, stating that he had needed some time off.

Adamson moved to Nashville in the mid-1990s, where he met country music singer/songwriter Marcus Hummon, and together they released an alternative country studio album as The Raphaels in 2001.

=== Farewell tour and Adamson's death ===
Adamson returned for the band's 'Final Fling' farewell tour, culminating in a sold-out concert at Glasgow's Barrowland Ballroom on 31 May 2000. They played what turned out to be their last gig in Kuala Lumpur, Malaysia, in October that year.

In November 2001, Adamson disappeared again. Appeals were put on the Big Country website asking for Adamson to call home and speak to anyone in the band, the management company, or his ex-wife. The website also requested that any fans who might have been 'harbouring' the singer to contact the management company and alert them to his whereabouts. Mark Brzezicki and Tony Butler had indicated they were concerned, but the reason Big Country had lasted so long was that they stayed out of one another's personal lives, and both later noted they were unaware of the extent of Adamson's problems. Adamson was found dead in a room at the Best Western Plaza Hotel in Honolulu, Hawaii, on 16 December 2001; he is believed to have died by suicide.

A memorial to Adamson was held at Carnegie Hall, Dunfermline, in January 2002, followed by a tribute concert at Glasgow Barrowlands in May. It brought together the remaining members of both Big Country and Skids; Adamson's teenage children, Callum and Kirsten; as well as Steve Harley, Runrig, Simon Townshend, Midge Ure and Bill Nelson.

=== 2007–present ===
In 2007, to celebrate 25 years of Big Country, founding members Bruce Watson, Tony Butler (now lead vocalist for the first time), and Mark Brzezicki reunited to embark on a tour of the UK with dates in Scotland and England and a gig in Cologne (Germany). They also released a new album, Twenty Five Live, on the Track Records label. After the anniversary activity, the band returned to their hiatus.

The surviving original members toured again in late December 2010 and January 2011 with Mike Peters of the Alarm and Jamie Watson, Bruce's son, added to the line-up. This line-up began more regular touring as well as writing new material for potential release, in part with the involvement of record producer Steve Lillywhite. The efforts resulted in the creation of "Another Country", Big Country's first single in 11 years.

In a September 2012 press release, Bruce Watson announced that Butler had retired from the group at the end of their last tour. He was replaced by former Simple Minds bassist Derek Forbes, who was Adamson's original choice for bassist on the initial Big Country recordings, although Forbes was not asked due to shyness on Adamson's part. The group also parted ways with longtime manager Ian Grant at the same time as Butler's departure. With the involvement of Forbes, later in 2012 and into 2013, the group recorded a new album in the Welsh town of Wrexham. The new material featured lyrics composed by Peters over band-written music; Butler still held writing credits on most of the album, with Forbes having contributed on a number of tracks as well, although he played all the album's bass parts. Titled The Journey, the album was released through Cherry Red Records in April 2013, becoming the group's first studio record since 1999. Further performances followed throughout the year, including a month-long North American tour between July and August.

Mike Peters left the band in November 2013 at the end of their 19-date Land's End to John O'Groats UK Tour. The band attributed Peters' departure to his inability to commit fully to Big Country, much of his time being devoted to The Alarm and solo projects. Initially, the band intended to continue as a four-piece, sharing lead vocals and returning all the songs to their original keys; Peters had required the songs to be tuned lower to accommodate his deeper voice. However, when they resurfaced in December 2013, they were joined by English singer Simon Hough, who performed most of the lead vocals as well as harmonica and additional guitar. While the status of Hough's membership was not immediately clarified, in a March 2014 podcast, Bruce Watson confirmed that Hough was now the band's fifth member. He also indicated that the group was working on new material, which would involve Hough, for potential future release.

On 9 July 2015, the band announced that Derek Forbes would no longer be performing with Big Country, and that all forthcoming gigs would go on with a replacement, Scott Whitley. On 12 November 2021, the band announced that bassist Scott Whitley would be leaving the band to pursue other interests. His replacement was Gil Allan, who remained with the band until October 2024.

Simon Hough announced on 12 May 2024 that he was leaving the band. On 24 May 2024 the band announced that singer Tommie Paxton would be "helping them out" for the year. Paxton is guitar player and singer with the Big Country tribute band Restless Natives. On 9 October 2024, Mark Brzezicki announced he was leaving the band, saying in a Facebook post, "I am unhappy with the current direction the band is taking, line-up changes and internal divisions". On 13 October, Reese Dobbin was announced as the band's new drummer. Around the same time Chris Stones replaced Allan as bassist. In February 2025, Brzezicki announced that he had formed a new band called From Big Country, and would be touring the UK playing his former band's songs. The line-up includes former frontman Simon Hough, former bassist Gil Allan and Steeleye Span guitarist Ken Nicol. Former vocalist Mike Peters died in April 2025, at the age of 66.

== Band members ==
=== Current ===
Image	Name	Years active	Instruments	Release contributions
	Bruce Watson	1981–2001; 2007; 2010–present	lead and rhythm guitar; mandolin; sitar; backing vocals	all releases
	Jamie Watson	2010–present	rhythm guitar; mandolin; backing vocals	The Journey (2013); Live 2011 Shepherds Bush Empire 15.04.2011 (2011)
	Tommie Paxton	2024–present	lead vocals; rhythm guitar	none to date
	Chris Stones	2024–present	bass	none to date
	Reece Dobbin	2024–present	drums	none to date

=== Former ===
Image	Name	Years active	Instruments	Release contributions
	Stuart Adamson	1981–2001 (until his death)	lead vocals; lead guitar; keyboards	all release from The Crossing (1983) to Driving to Damascus (John Wayne's Dream) (1999)
	Pete Wishart	1981–1982	keyboards	none
	Alan Wishart	1981–1982	bass	none
	Clive Parker	1981–1982	drums	none
	Tony Butler	1982–2001; 2007; 2010–2012	bass; backing vocals; lead vocals (2007)	all release from The Crossing (1983) to Live 2011 Shepherds Bush Empire 15.04.2011 (2011)
	Mark Brzezicki	1982–1989; 1993–2001; 2007; 2010–2024	drums; backing vocals	all releases except The Buffalo Skinners (1993)
	Pat Ahern	1990–1991	drums	No Place Like Home (1991) one track only; Live Hits (2003)
	Mike Peters	2010–2013 (died 2025)	lead vocals; acoustic guitar	Live 2011 Shepherds Bush Empire 15.04.2011 (2011); The Journey (2013)
	Derek Forbes	2012–2015	bass; keyboards; backing vocals	The Journey (2013)
	Simon Hough	2014–2024	lead vocals; rhythm guitar	All Lay Down and Love Is The Law (2015)
	Chris Squires	2015 (substitute)	drums	none – last minute replacement for an ill Mark Brzezicki at Hard Rocks Calling 2015
	Scott Whitley	2015–2021	bass; backing vocals	none
	Gil Allan	2021–2024	bass; backing vocals	none

== Discography ==
=== Studio albums ===
- The Crossing (1983)
- Steeltown (1984)
- The Seer (1986)
- Peace in Our Time (1988)
- No Place Like Home (1991)
- The Buffalo Skinners (1993)
- Why the Long Face (1995)
- Driving to Damascus (John Wayne's Dream) (1999)
- The Journey (2013)

=== Music videos ===
- "Harvest Home" – September 1982
- "Fields of Fire" – February 1983
- "In a Big Country" – May 1983
- "Chance" – August 1983
- "Wonderland" – January 1984
- "East of Eden" – September 1984
- "Where the Rose Is Sown" – November 1984
- "Just a Shadow" - January 1985
- "Look Away" – April 1986
- "Hold the Heart" – November 1986
- "The Teacher" – June 1986
- "One Great Thing" – August 1986
- "King of Emotion" – August 1988
- "Broken Heart (Thirteen Valleys)" – October 1988
- "Peace in Our Time" – January 1989
- "Save Me" – April 1990
- "Heart of the World" – July 1990
- "Republican Party Reptile" – August 1991
- "Beautiful People" – October 1991
- "Alone" – March 1993
- "Ships" – April 1993
- "I'm Not Ashamed" – May 1995
- "You Dreamer" – August 1995
- "Fragile Thing" – August 1999
- "Perfect World" – October 1999
- "Somebody Else" – May 2000
- "Another Country" – August 2011
- "Hurt" – April 2013
- "In a Broken Promise Land" – April 2013
- "Love Is The Law" - 2015
- "All Lay Down" - 2015
