= Wonderland (Big Country song) =

Single by Big Country
- B-side: "Giant"
- Released: 13 January 1984
- Recorded: 1983
- Genre: New wave, Celtic rock, post-punk
- Length: 3:59
- Label: Mercury
- Songwriters: Stuart Adamson; Mark Brzezicki; Tony Butler; Bruce Watson
- Producer: Steve Lillywhite

Big Country singles chronology
"Chance" (1983)	"Wonderland" (1984)	"East of Eden" (1984)

"Wonderland" is a single-only release by Anglo-Scottish band Big Country, released in the UK on 9 January 1984 between their first and second albums. It became a top ten hit for them in the UK, peaking at number 8, giving the band their third top ten entry. The song was included on all the band's subsequent greatest hits collections, although it was never released on any of the band's studio albums. Also released as a 4-song EP in the US in 1984 on Mercury (Mercury 818835-1 M-1) with the A-side consisting of "Wonderland" and "All Fall Together" and the B-side with "Angle Park" and "The Crossing".

The music video for the song features the band playing the song in a wooded area.

== Critical reception ==
Upon its release, Tommy Vance, reviewing for Kerrang!, believed "Wonderland" "should be heard by anyone who likes fine music". He added, "I'm a real fan of Steve Lillywhite's productions and he's done a superb job here. The guitar sound is good and the drumming superb." Ian Birch of Smash Hits called it "Big Country's answer to the Gone with the Wind – bags of romance, riding off into deep red sunsets and never letting on how upset you really are". He added, "It needs to be played at great volume to capture the sound and the sweep."

Lemmy, as guest reviewer for Record Mirror, commented, "Very good. I like them. Nice time signature. They seem to be a good, consistent, useful band." Karen Swayne of Number One considered the song to be "archetypal Big Country – broad, sweeping and majestic". She added it "proves once again that they can make rock sound fresh" and noted "there's less of a Celtic feel too". Billboard characterised the song as "heartfelt electro-folk".

== Charts ==
Chart	Peak position
Finland (Suomen virallinen lista)	28
UK Singles Chart	8
US Billboard Hot 100	86
US Billboard Top Rock Tracks	48
