= Steve Lillywhite =

English record producer (born 1955)

Steve Lillywhite CBE
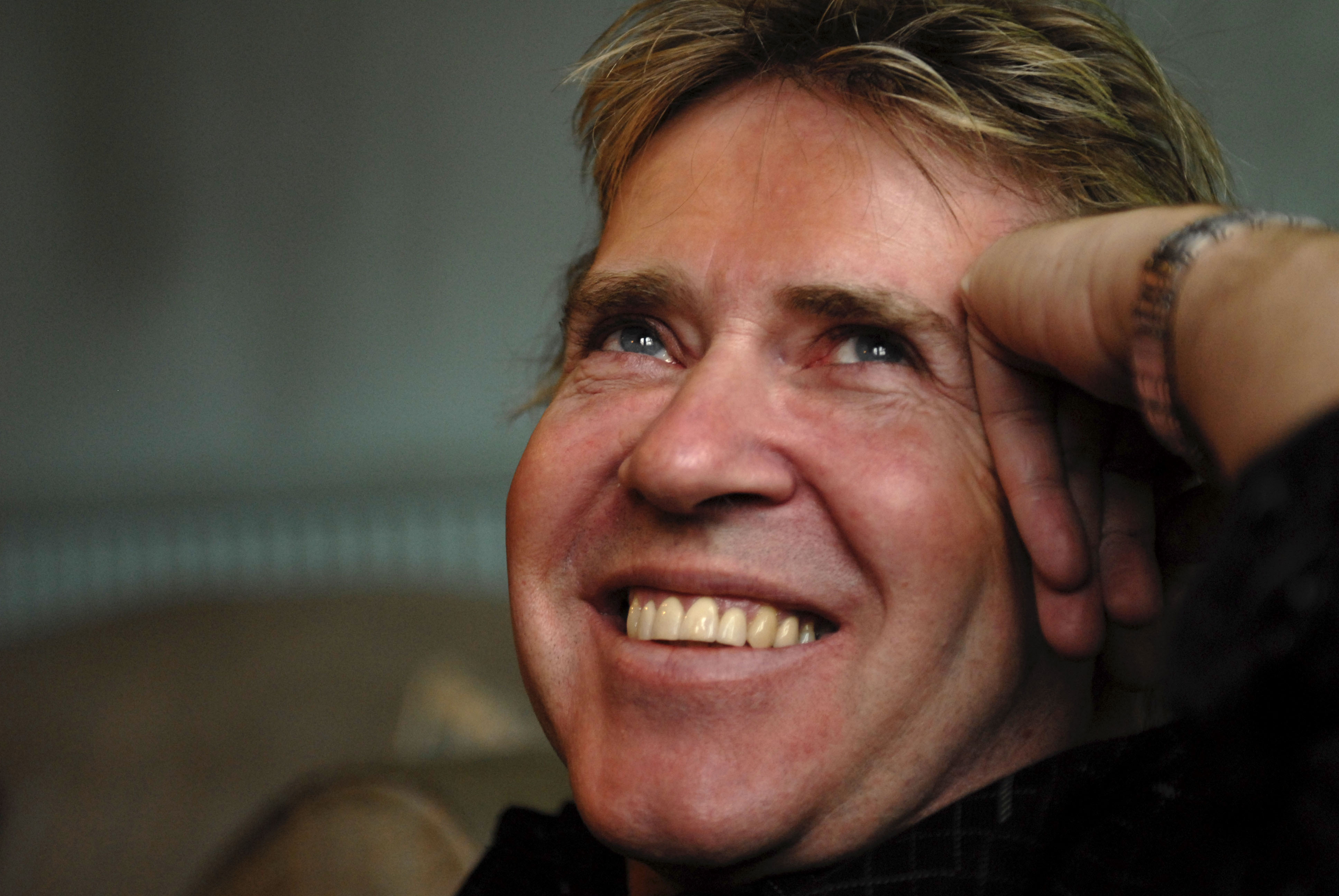
- Lillywhite in 2010

Background information
- Born: Stephen Alan Lillywhite; 15 March 1955 (age 71)
- Origin: Egham, Surrey, England
- Genres: Rock; post-punk; new wave
- Occupation: Record producer
- Years active: 1977–present

Stephen Alan Lillywhite CBE (born 15 March 1955) is an English record producer. Since he began his career in 1977, Lillywhite has been credited on over 500 records, and has collaborated with a variety of musicians including new wave acts XTC, Big Country, Siouxsie and the Banshees, Simple Minds, Ultravox, the Psychedelic Furs, Beady Eye, Toyah, David Byrne, Talking Heads, and Kirsty MacColl, as well as U2, Anni-Frid Lyngstad, the Rolling Stones, the Pogues, Johnny Thunders, Blue October, Steel Pulse, the La's, Peter Gabriel, Morrissey, the Killers, Dave Matthews Band, Phish, Guster, Counting Crows, and Joan Armatrading. He has won six Grammy Awards, including Album of the Year and Producer of the Year, Non-Classical in 2006. In 2012, he was made a CBE for his contribution to music.

== Early life ==
Lillywhite was born in Surrey, England in 1955.

== Career ==
=== Early years ===
Lillywhite entered the music industry in 1972, when he worked as a tape operator at Phonogram Studios in London. He produced a demo recording for Ultravox, which led to them being offered a recording contract with Island Records. Lillywhite soon joined Island as a staff producer, where he worked with many of the leading new wave musicians, including his brother's band, the Members, and former New York Dolls and Heartbreakers guitarist Johnny Thunders, for whom he produced a solo album, So Alone. His first commercial success came in August 1978 as the producer of "Hong Kong Garden", the debut single from Siouxsie and the Banshees, which peaked at number seven in the UK singles chart. He was soon hired to produce Siouxsie and the Banshees' debut album, The Scream, which was certified silver in the UK. He also produced "Ku Klux Klan", the first single that Steel Pulse released on Island Records in 1978. In 1979, he scored two hits for Virgin Records with The Members: the Surrey anthem "Sound of the Suburbs" and protest reggae classic "Offshore Banking Business". Lillywhite, along with engineer Hugh Padgham, began working with the band XTC in June and July 1979 at Townhouse Studios in London for Virgin Records. The resulting album, Drums and Wires, was released on 17 August 1979, and "Making Plans for Nigel", the single taken from the album, reached number 17 on the UK singles chart in the autumn that year.

=== 1980s ===
In February 1980, the Psychedelic Furs' self-titled debut album was released, produced by Lillywhite. He also produced Peter Gabriel's critically acclaimed third solo album, Peter Gabriel (also known as III or Melt), which was released in May 1980 and topped the UK album chart. It established Gabriel as "one of rock's most ambitious, innovative musicians" and "raised considerably" Lillywhite's profile. During the recording of the album, he pioneered (with Gabriel and engineer Hugh Padgham) the gated reverb drum sound, which became a hallmark of Phil Collins' solo career. Later in the year, Boy, the debut album of U2, was released, produced by Lillywhite. Lillywhite's collaboration with U2 continued with the albums October, War, and The Joshua Tree. He moved on to produce work by Bruce Foxton (of the Jam), Big Country, XTC, the Chameleons, Toyah, Talking Heads, Eddie and the Hot Rods, Morrissey, the Rolling Stones, and the Shine album by ABBA vocalist Anni-Frid Lyngstad. Lillywhite was also hired by Rush to produce their 1984 album Grace Under Pressure, but much to their frustration, withdrew from the project to work with Simple Minds. Alex Lifeson, Geddy Lee, and Neil Peart referred to Lillywhite as a man not of his word for not following through on what had already been scheduled.

In 1987, Lillywhite worked with the Pogues, producing "Fairytale of New York". His wife, Kirsty MacColl, provided the lead female vocal for the song, which became the band's biggest hit. The single narrowly missed being the UK Christmas number one single, but was still one of the biggest-selling records that year, and has frequently returned to the holiday charts. MacColl also provided additional vocals during Lillywhite's production of Talking Heads' final album, 1988's Naked.

The song "Cotton Fields", from the Pogues' 1989 album Peace and Love (also produced by Lillywhite), includes a reference to "Steve Lillywhite's drunken mix".

=== 1990s ===
During the 1990s, Lillywhite produced the multi-platinum albums Under the Table and Dreaming, Crash, and Before These Crowded Streets by the Dave Matthews Band. In 1991, he continued to produce Morrissey and co-produced songs from U2's Achtung Baby, working alongside Brian Eno, Daniel Lanois, and Flood. That same year, he returned to Dublin to produce Engine Alley's debut album entitled A Sonic Holiday, and Kirsty MacColl again provided additional vocals, this time for the single "Song for Someone". He also produced Travis' debut album and the debut (and only) album by The La's. In 1996, he produced Phish's Billy Breathes, and he returned to produce Joy in 2009.

Lillywhite was featured as the subject for a BBC Radio 1 documentary series on record producers. In 1999, he produced the US band Guster's Lost and Gone Forever.

=== 2000s ===
In 2000, Lillywhite was fired from the fourth album by the Dave Matthews Band after band members cited creative differences. In 2001, a number of their recordings emerged on a bootleg album, known now as The Lillywhite Sessions; many of the songs from those recordings followed later, on the Dave Matthews Band's album Busted Stuff. The unfinished tracks appeared online, and the majority of the tracks were re-recorded, without Lillywhite, with Stephen Harris as the preferred choice by the band.

In 2002, Universal Music Group head Lucian Grainge invited Lillywhite to become managing director. Lillywhite signed singer-songwriter Darius Danesh and served as executive producer for his debut album Dive In, which spawned three Top 10 hits and Mercury Records' first number one in eighteen years. He also signed Razorlight and produced Jason Mraz's Mr. A-Z.

In September 2005, Lillywhite joined Columbia Records as a Senior Vice President of A&R. During his tenure, he signed MGMT. He left the label at the end of 2006. Lillywhite collected consecutive Grammy Awards for Record of the Year with U2's "Beautiful Day"and "Walk On". In 2006, Lillywhite won three more Grammys: Producer of the Year (Non-Classical), Best Rock Album also, with U2's How to Dismantle an Atomic Bomb; and a partial win for Album of the Year, also for How to Dismantle an Atomic Bomb.

In late 2006, he worked with Chris Cornell on his album Carry On, and also produced two songs on Switchfoot's album, Oh! Gravity.. In February 2007, Lillywhite began work with Crowded House on tracks for Time on Earth, the band's first studio album in fourteen years. The majority of the album was produced by Ethan Johns, but Lillywhite produced four songs with the full touring line-up, including new drummer Matt Sherrod as well as studio guest guitarist Johnny Marr. Lillywhite's next project was working with Matchbox Twenty on an EP that comprised a portion of Exile on Mainstream, a two-disc album that entered the US charts at No. 3 and Australian charts at No. 1. In 2008, Lillywhite again worked alongside Brian Eno and Daniel Lanois on U2's No Line on the Horizon. He also worked on Blue October's Approaching Normal and rejoined Flood to work with Thirty Seconds to Mars on This Is War.

In 2008, Lillywhite produced a number of recordings for the World Cafe radio show on NPR. This included sessions at Avatar Studios in New York with Fleet Foxes, She & Him, Bell X1, Dr. Dog, and Mercury Rev.

In November 2009, he began presenting his own weekly radio show on East Village Radio called "The Lillywhite Sessions".

=== 2010s ===
On 25 May 2010, the official Oasis website announced that Lillywhite was working with Liam Gallagher, Gem Archer, Andy Bell, and Chris Sharrock on material for their new band Beady Eye. He co-produced, with the band, the album Different Gear, Still Speeding.

Lillywhite produced an album for Evanescence at MSR Studios from February 2010 to April that year, but it was scrapped in early 2011. On his work with Evanescence, Lillywhite said: "What happened was a few people lost their nerve. I don't even think it was her [Amy Lee]. It was people at the record company who really had no other band. They were thinking more in terms of the commerce rather than the art."

In 2011, Bono and the Edge brought Lillywhite in to produce the Spider-Man: Turn Off the Dark cast recording for Interscope.

On 16 July 2012, the Irish Examiner reported that Lillywhite was attached to a new television show entitled The Hit.

Lillywhite reunited with Thirty Seconds to Mars in 2012, co-producing the band's fourth studio album Love, Lust, Faith and Dreams, alongside Jared Leto.

In 2015, at the 57th Annual Grammy Awards, Lillywhite was awarded his sixth Grammy Award for his work on Juanes's album Loco De Amor. In that same year he was credited as a producer on Amy Lee's cover of Chris Isaak's "Baby Did a Bad, Bad Thing" for her Recover, Vol. 1 EP. The track had originally been recorded for Evanescence's third album, produced by Lillywhite in 2010, but was then rejected by the band's label, Wind-up Records.

In 2016, Lillywhite produced an album by the Thai rock band Slot Machine.

In April 2017, musician and writer Jon Regen wrote an article for The New York Times profiling Lillywhite and his work bundling recorded CDs with fried chicken in Indonesian KFC restaurants.

Lillywhite worked with a Japanese act for the first time when he co-produced Luna Sea's 2019 album Cross. In interviews about the album, the producer has stated that he is semi-retired, living in Jakarta for the past five years, and now only works with select artists.

== Personal life ==
From 1984 to 1994, Lillywhite was married to Kirsty MacColl; they had two sons, Jamie and Louis. MacColl died in 2000. He married Patricia Louise Galluzzi on 29 May 2004; they divorced ten years later.

Lillywhite was made a Commander of the Order of the British Empire (CBE) in the 2012 New Year Honours for services to music and was awarded an honorary degree by the University of Surrey in 2025.

== Selected works ==
- Beady Eye – Different Gear, Still Speeding
- Big Country – The Crossing, Wonderland, Steeltown
- Bruce Foxton – Touch Sensitive
- Blue October – Approaching Normal
- Chris Cornell – Carry On
- Climie Fisher – some songs from Everything
- Counting Crows – Hard Candy
- Crowded House – Time on Earth
- Darius Danesh – Dive In
- Dark Star – Twenty Twenty Sound
- Dave Matthews Band – Under the Table and Dreaming, Crash, Before These Crowded Streets, The Lillywhite Sessions (unreleased), Away from the World
- Elwood – The Parlance of Our Time
- Frida – Shine
- Gigi – Setia Bersama Menyayangi dan Mencintai
- Guster – Lost and Gone Forever
- Iwan Fals – SATU
- Jason Mraz – Mr. A-Z
- Joan Armatrading – Walk Under Ladders, The Key, mixing on Sleight of Hand
- Johnny Thunders – So Alone
- Juanes – Loco de Amor
- Kirsty MacColl – Kite, Electric Landlady
- Luna Sea – Cross
- Marshall Crenshaw – Field Day
- Matchbox Twenty – Exile on Mainstream
- Morrissey – Vauxhall and I, Southpaw Grammar, Maladjusted
- Noah – Second Chance
- Ours – Distorted Lullabies
- Penetration – Coming Up for Air
- Peter Gabriel – Peter Gabriel (aka Peter Gabriel III or Melt)
- Phish – Billy Breathes, Joy
- Rearview Mirror – All Lights Off
- Simple Minds – Sparkle in the Rain
- Siouxsie and the Banshees – The Scream
- Slank – Palalopeyank
- Switchfoot – Oh! Gravity.
- Talking Heads – Naked
- The Adventure Babies – Laugh
- The Killers – Battle Born
- The La's – The La's
- The Members – At the Chelsea Nightclub
- The Pogues – If I Should Fall From Grace with God, Peace and Love
- The Psychedelic Furs – The Psychedelic Furs, Talk Talk Talk
- The Rolling Stones – Dirty Work
- The Sam Willows – Glasshouse (Lillywhite edition)
- The Smiths – mixed the "Ask" single (The World Won't Listen)
- Thirty Seconds to Mars – This Is War, Love, Lust, Faith and Dreams
- Thompson Twins – Set
- Tom Robinson – Sector 27
- Toyah – The Changeling
- Travis – Good Feeling
- U2 – Boy, October, War, and How to Dismantle an Atomic Bomb; as well as some songs on The Joshua Tree, Achtung Baby, All That You Can't Leave Behind, No Line on the Horizon, and Songs of Experience
- Ultravox – Ultravox!, Ha!-Ha!-Ha!
- Urban Verbs – Early Damage
- World Party – Bang!
- XTC – Drums and Wires, Black Sea
