= Bruce Watson (Scottish guitarist) =

Canadian-born Scottish guitarist (born 1961)

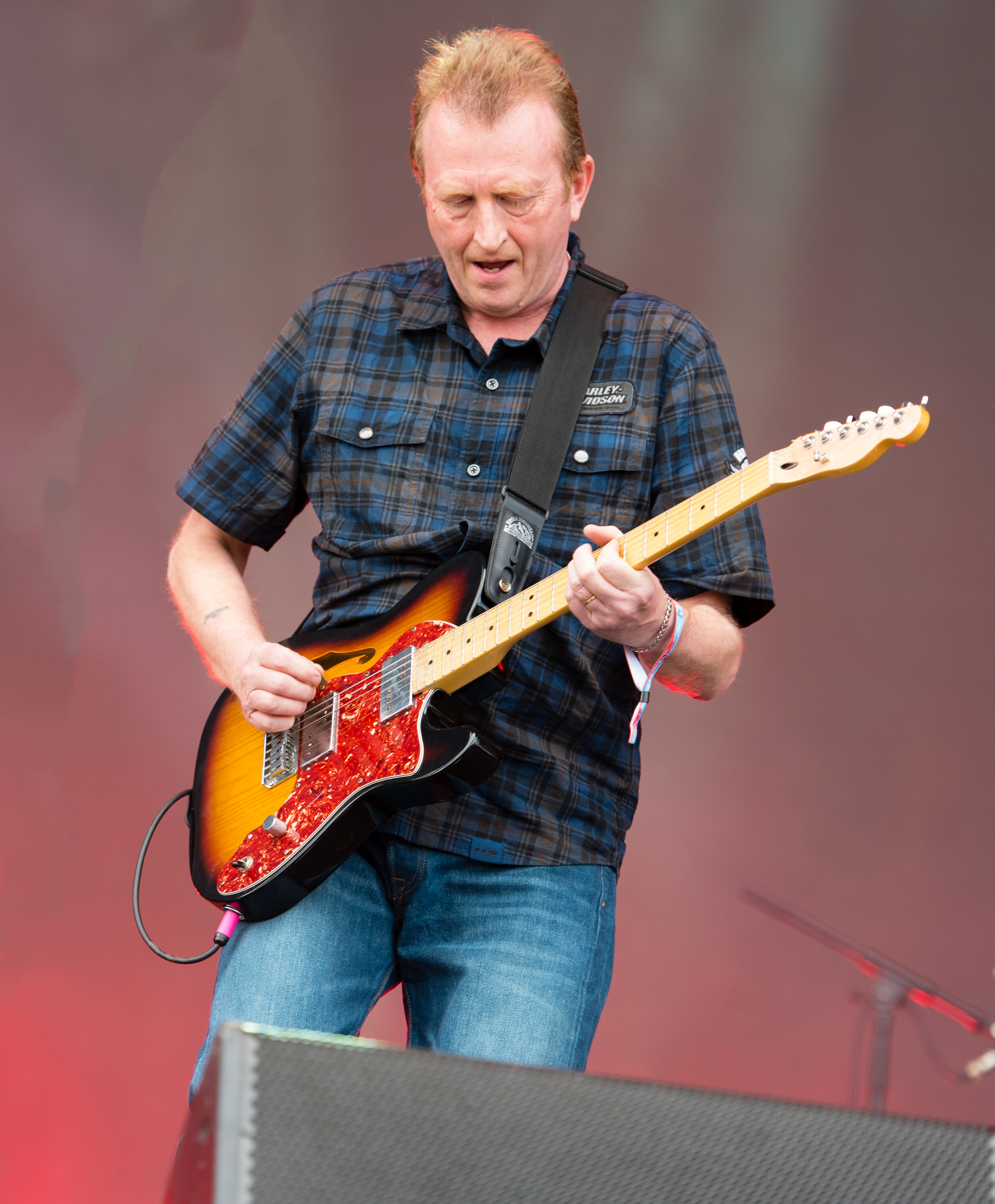
- Watson in 2018

Background information
- Born: Bruce William Watson; March 11, 1961 (age 65); Timmins, Ontario, Canada
- Origin: Dunfermline, Fife, Scotland
- Genres: Rock; new wave
- Occupation: Musician
- Instruments: Guitar; sitar; mandolin; vocals
- Years active: 1975–present
- Labels: Phonogram Records; Track-BCR Records
- Member of: Big Country
- Formerly of: Casbah Club, Skids
- Website: Official Website of Bruce and Jamie Watson

Bruce William Watson (born March 11, 1961) is a Canadian-born Scottish guitarist, best known for being a member of Big Country.

== Early life and career ==
Watson was born in Timmins, Ontario, Canada. He moved with his family to Scotland as an infant. He grew up in the Dunfermline area nearby to Stuart Adamson,

Prior to joining Big Country, Watson had worked at Rosyth naval base cleaning nuclear submarines. He had also been a lead guitarist of several Fife-based bands including the Delinquents and Eurosect. It was during this time, that Watson first met Stuart Adamson, as the Delinquents acted as a support act for The Skids in their early days. One of Watson's bandmates Raymond Davidson was the brother of Sandra Davidson, Adamson's future wife.

Watson and Adamson were the two founding members of Big Country in summer 1981, after Adamson departed The Skids. After several lineup changes, the pair were joined by Tony Butler and Mark Brzezicki in early 1982, and the band went on to have considerable success.

== Role in Big Country ==
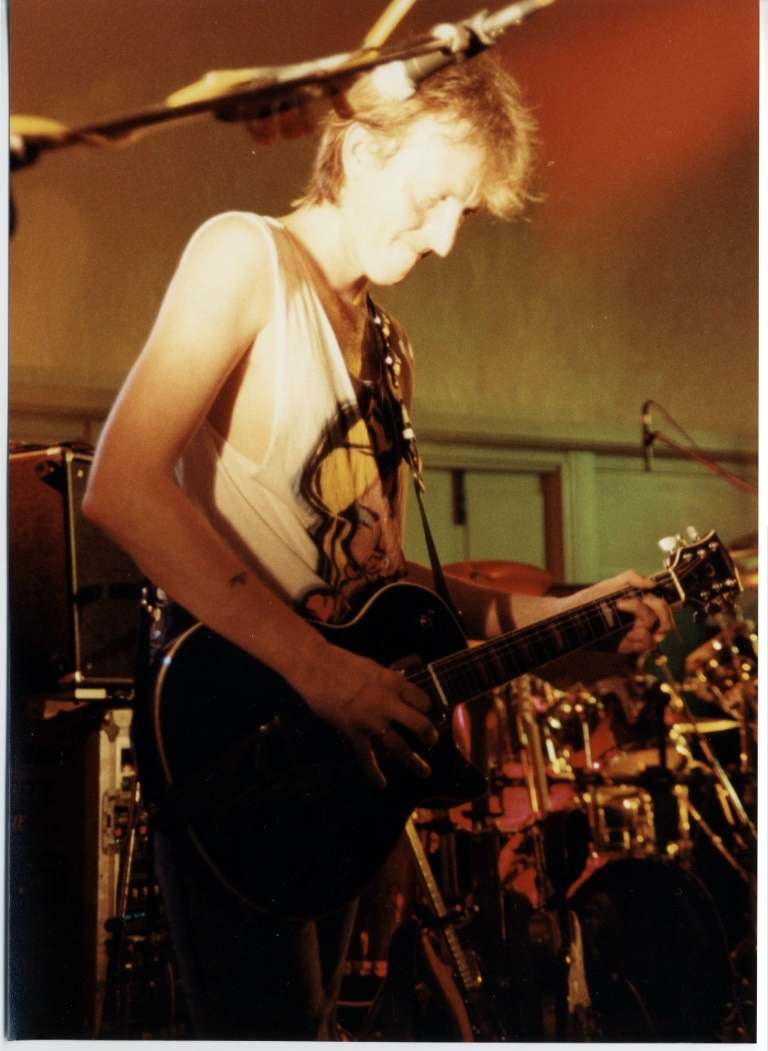
Watson in 1991

Watson's role in the band was primarily as a supporting guitarist. He typically contributed rhythmic textures ("Wonderland", "Lost Patrol") and repetitive melodic fills ("In a Big Country", "Look Away") which underpinned verses, contrasting with Stuart Adamson's more straightforward chord work in these sections. During solos, as Adamson played the main melody, Watson often contributed a counter-melody. Watson also played slide guitar on some of the band's early material, including "Rain Dance" and "Red Fox." Later on, Adamson played much of the slide guitar work on the band's songs. Watson is also an accomplished mandolin player, and put this skill to use on several of Big Country's more country and western-influenced songs, including "Broken Heart (Thirteen Valleys)".

During recent tours, Watson has played many of Adamson's lead guitar parts live, while his son, Jamie, fulfils his old role.

Watson has played guitar on every Big Country album, and co-wrote many Big Country songs with Adamson. He also sang live backing vocals.

== Performances and tours ==
In the summer of 2007, Watson played with the Skids who had reformed to play two gigs in Dunfermline prior to a set on the main stage at T in the Park.

Also in 2007, to celebrate 25 years of Big Country, he reunited with founding members Tony Butler and Mark Brzezicki to embark on a tour of the UK with dates in Scotland and England. Fellow band co-founder Stuart Adamson died in December 2001.

Starting in 2008, Watson began performing with his son Jamie Watson, as well as releasing an album, The Portastudio Diaries (2009), which chronicled a series of recordings in Bruce Watson's home recording studio.

Bruce and Jamie, along with American musician Tom Kercheval have a side project called WKW. WKW released an album in 2019 called Men of Steel.
