= Mark Brzezicki =

English musician

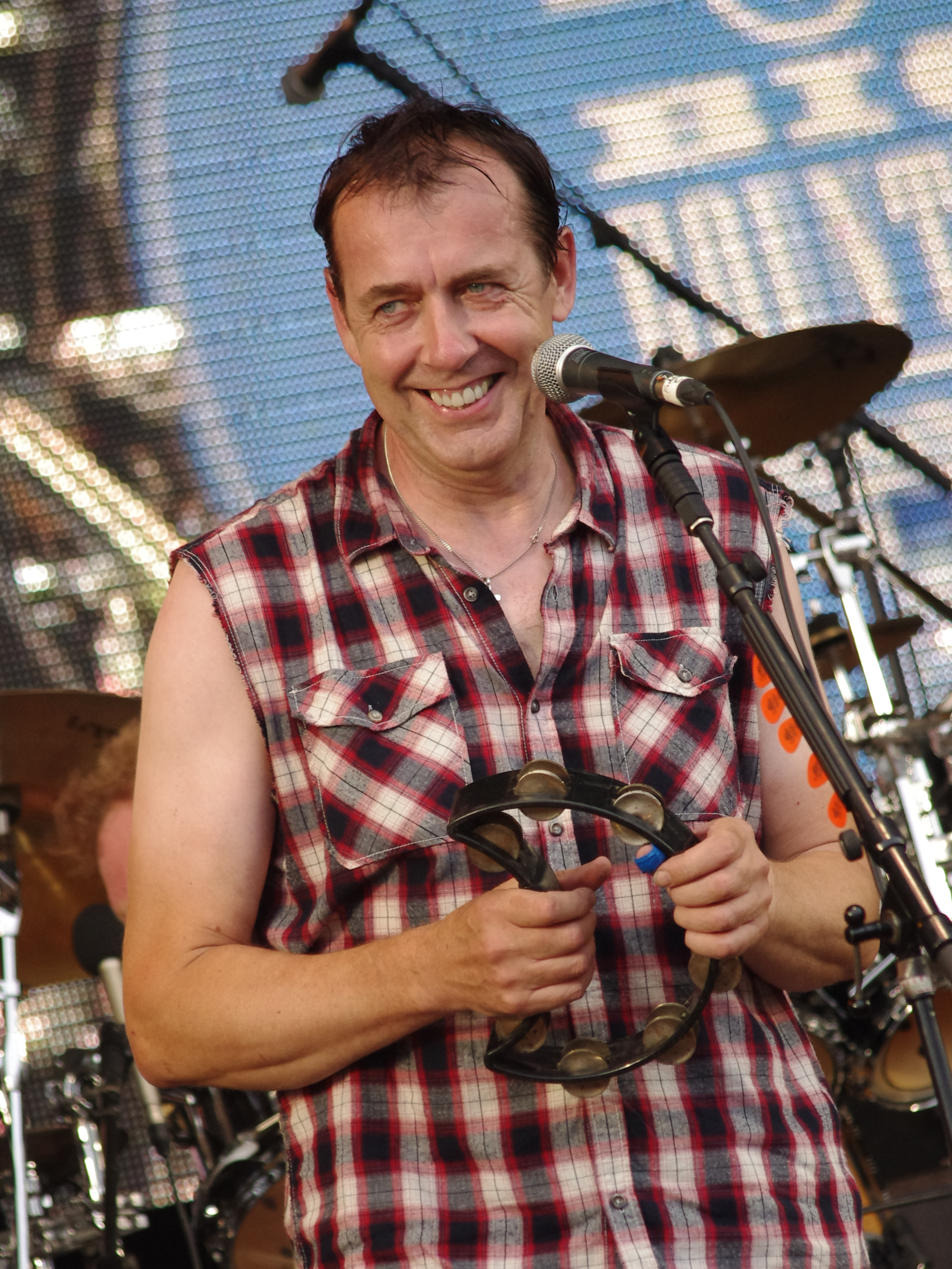
- Brzezicki in 2012

Background information
- Born: Mark Michael Brzezicki; 21 June 1957 (age 69)
- Origin: Slough, Buckinghamshire, England
- Genres: Rock; pop
- Occupation: Musician
- Instrument: Drums
- Years active: 1980–present
- Labels: Phonogram; Track-BCR
- Member of: From Big Country
- Formerly of: Big Country; The Cult; From the Jam; Procol Harum; Casbah Club; Ultravox

Mark Michael Brzezicki (English: /brˈzəˈzɪtsˈki/ brə-ZIK-ee, Polish: [bʐɛˈʑitskʲi]; born 21 June 1957) is an English musician who is best known as the former drummer of the Scottish rock band Big Country. He has also played with Procol Harum, Casbah Club, the Cult, and From the Jam.

== Early life ==
Brzezicki was born in the Langley area of Slough to a Polish father and English mother. His father Piotr had been a member of the Polish resistance during the Second World War, and had escaped to Britain, where he became a mechanic for the Royal Air Force (RAF) serving with the Polish No. 303 Squadron RAF. After the war he settled with an English woman Kathleen in Langley near to Heathrow Airport where he found work as a mechanic.

Brzezicki's family was musical, and he took up drumming as a child.

== Career ==
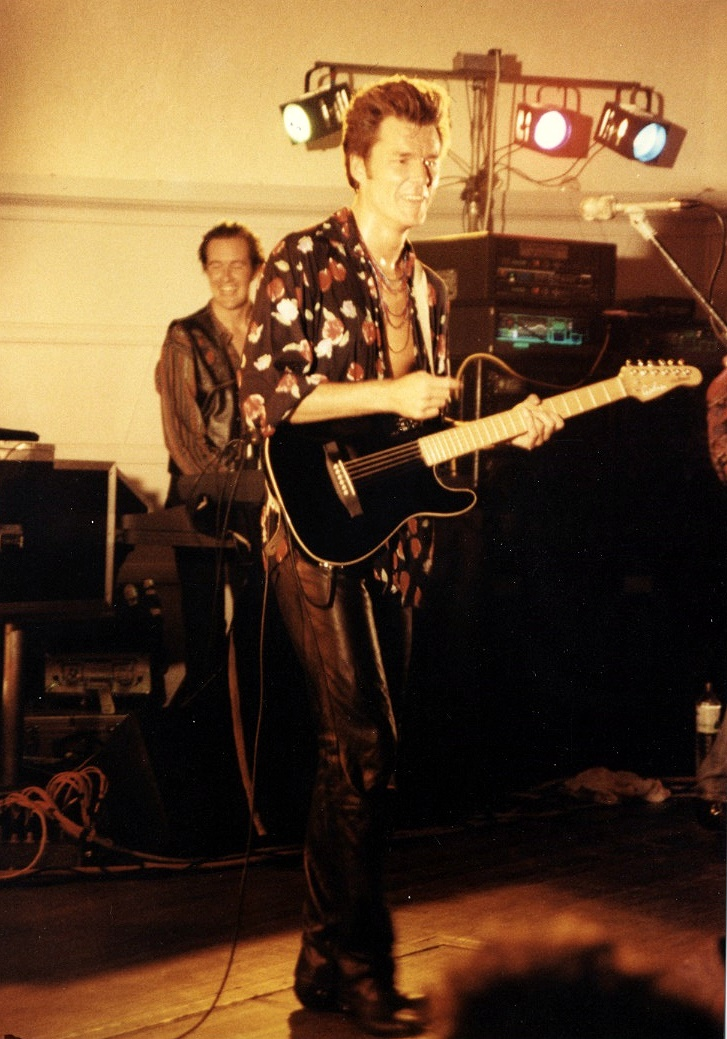
Brzezicki (left) and Stuart Adamson in 1991

Brzezicki first played on two singles with the band On the Air featuring bass player Tony Butler and Simon Townshend in 1980. Brzezicki quickly developed to become a session drummer and he played on the track "A Little Is Enough" on Pete Townshend's Empty Glass album from 1980. Brzezicki and Butler, who had formed a session based company 'Rhythm for Hire' shortly joined Big Country and they released their debut album The Crossing in 1983. His session work continued and Brzezicki was also the sole drummer on Shine, the second (and to date final) English-language studio album by Swedish singer Anni-Frid Lyngstad of ABBA, released in 1984.

Smash Hits magazine had a running gag in the 1980s wherein they referred to the drummer as "Mark Unpronounceablename of Big Country". On Pete Townshend's All the Best Cowboys Have Chinese Eyes (1982) and White City: A Novel (1985) albums, there are joking references to the spelling of Brzezicki's last name.

As a session drummer he has also played on recordings with Virginia Astley, the Cult, Midge Ure, Ultravox, Nils Lofgren, Nik Kershaw, Roger Daltrey, Joan Armatrading, Fish, Procol Harum, Howard Jones, Steve Harley, Rick Astley, the Crazy World of Arthur Brown, Tiffany, From the Jam and Thunderclap Newman. He was part of the Prince’s Trust house band for seven years, and played in the Nelson Mandela 70th Birthday Tribute concert in 1988.

In 2004, Brzezicki helped form a new band, Casbah Club, with Bruce Foxton and Simon Townshend.

On 10 October 2009, Brzezicki joined the Cult onstage at the Royal Albert Hall in London. He joined original members Ian Astbury, Billy Duffy and Jamie Stewart, with whom he had recorded their album Love (1985), to perform "Phoenix" and "She Sells Sanctuary" as a second and final encore to a live performance of Love. His brother Steve Brzezicki is a session bassist with whom he frequently collaborates, and he uses both the traditional and matched grips.

On 9 October 2024, he announced on Facebook that he was leaving Big Country after more than 40 years. He stated that he was unhappy with the band's current direction, line-up changes and internal divisions. In February 2025, Brzezicki announced that he had formed a new band called From Big Country, and would be touring the UK playing his former band's songs. The line-up included former Big Country frontman Simon Hough, the Icicle Works bassist Chris Leyhe, and Steeleye Span guitarist Ken Nicol.

== See also ==
- List of drummers
- List of Procol Harum members
- List of the Cult band members
