= Tony Butler (musician) =

British musician and rock bassist

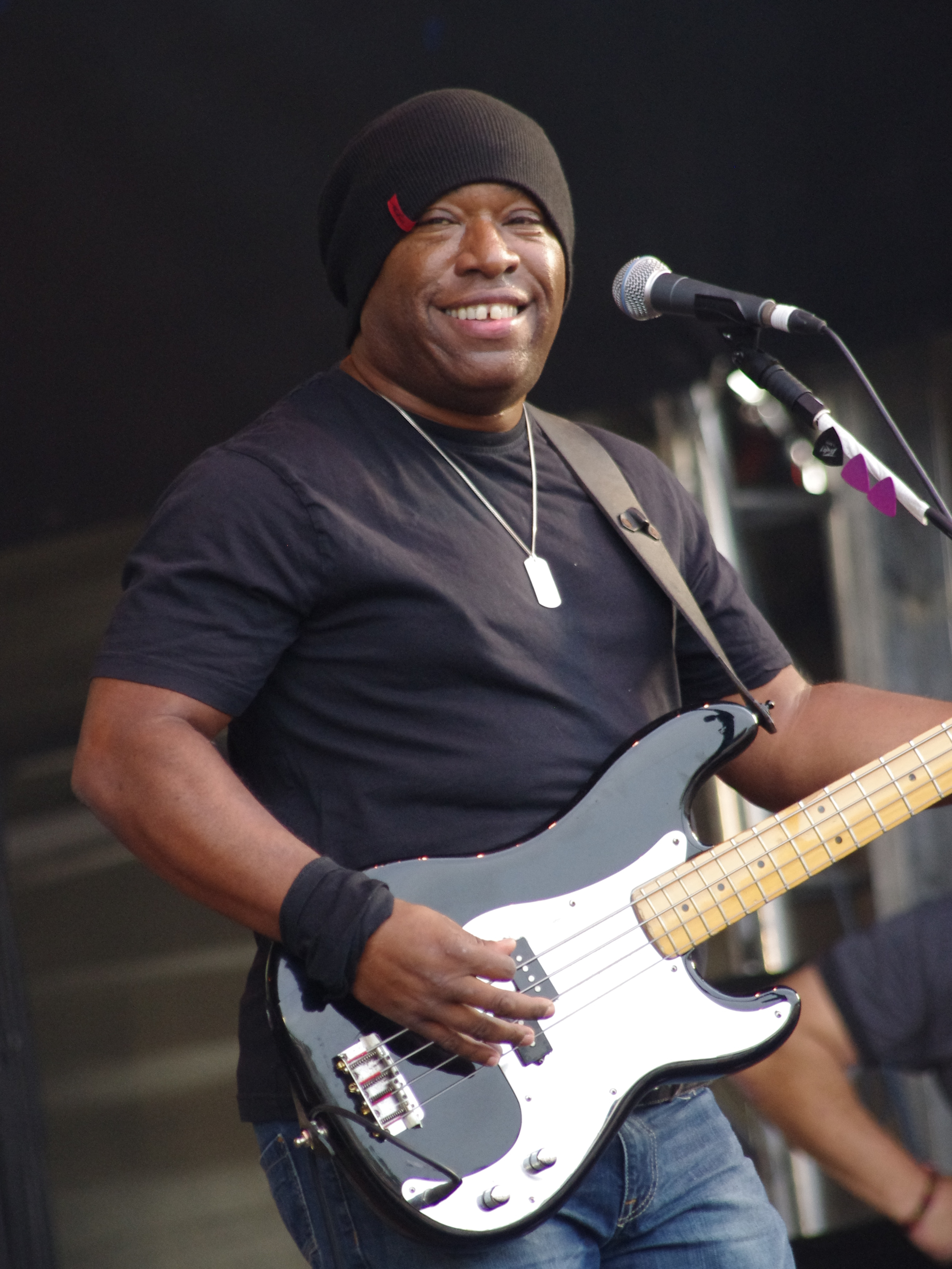
- Butler in 2012

Background information
- Born: Anthony Earle Peter Butler; 13 February 1957 (age 69); White City, London, England
- Genres: Rock
- Occupation: Musician
- Instruments: Bass guitar; vocals
- Years active: 1981–present
- Labels: Phonogram; Track-BCR
- Website: tonybutlertb.co.uk

Anthony Earle Peter Butler (born 13 February 1957) is a British bassist, best known for his work with Scottish rock band Big Country. He has also worked with On the Air, The Pretenders, Roger Daltrey, and Pete Townshend, among others.

== Early life ==
Butler was born at Hammersmith Hospital in White City, London, England. His parents had emigrated to England in 1956 from the Caribbean island of Dominica. Butler's father was killed in a road accident in 1963, when he was six years old.

Butler has a multi-racial heritage, as his great-grandfather had been Scottish, and had moved to the Caribbean from Edinburgh for business reasons, and had lived with a local woman as a concubine. Butler has attributed his Scottish heritage for his love of Celtic music.

== Career ==
Butler grew up with Simon Townshend (the younger brother of The Who's guitarist Pete Townshend) as a school friend and together they made music. In the late 1970s Butler joined Townshend's short-lived band On the Air which also included drummer Mark Brzezicki. On the Air released two singles in 1980 and toured with the Scottish band The Skids, which was where Butler met Stuart Adamson. In 1982 Butler joined Adamson's new band Big Country with his drumming partner Mark Brzezicki, which went on to enjoy success internationally during the 1980s and 1990s, he remained in the band until the end of 2000.

He also did session work with other artists including Pete Townshend, Roger Daltrey and The Pretenders among others, and declined an invitation by Chrissie Hynde to join The Pretenders. He played the bass on The Pretenders 1982 single "Back on the Chain Gang", and a warm-up bass riff Butler used was incorporated into the B-side "My City Was Gone" and was also co-opted by The Rush Limbaugh Show as its opening theme.

In 2007, to celebrate 25 years of Big Country, Butler reunited with founder members Bruce Watson and Mark Brzezicki to embark on a tour of the UK. He became lead vocalist for the first time, taking over from the deceased Stuart Adamson. The band toured during 2010–11 with Mike Peters of The Alarm on vocals. Butler left Big Country again in 2012, citing differences with his bandmates, to be replaced by former Simple Minds bassist Derek Forbes.

Butler moved to Cornwall with his family in the 1980s and became a further education teacher in the 2000s. As of 2017, Butler ran courses in music at Petroc College in Devon.

In 2018, Butler released an autobiography and a solo album, My Time.

== Discography ==
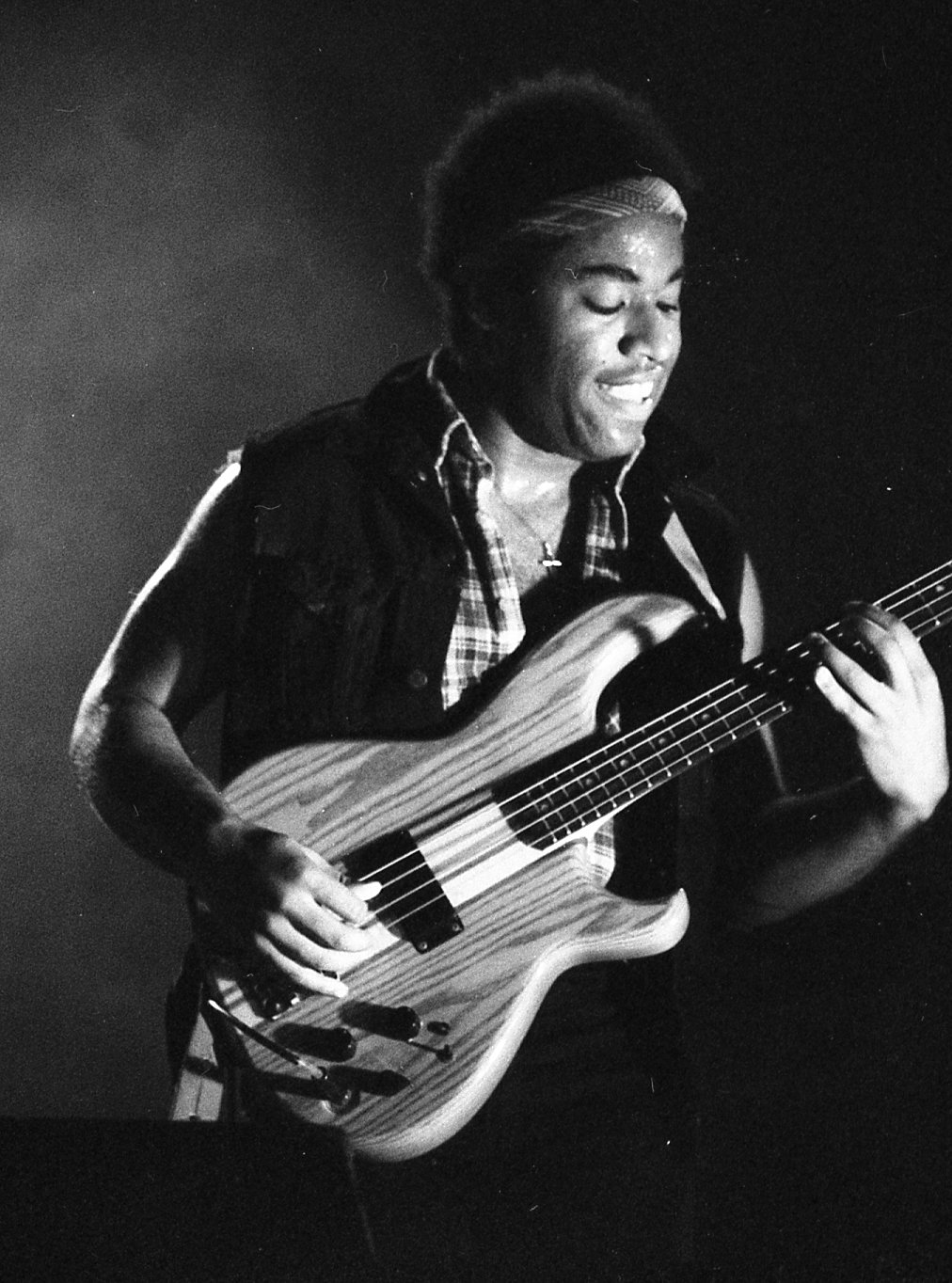
Butler in 1983

=== Solo albums ===
Tony Butler has released several solo albums:

- The Great Unknown (1997)
- One Day To The Next (A Song for ME Awareness) (1998)
- The Great Unknown (Slight Return) (2001)
- Demos Of Themes and Other Dreams (2001)
- Acoustica (2002)
- Life Goes On (2005)
- My Time (2018)
- No Profit in a Peaceful World (2025)
