= Simple Soul =

Studio album by Eddi Reader
- Released: UK: 29 January 2001; US: 9 January 2001
- Studio: Driftwood Studios, London
- Genre: Folk
- Length: 44:42
- Label: Rough Trade
- Producer: Eddi Reader; Roy Dodds

Eddi Reader chronology
Angels & Electricity (1998)	Simple Soul (2001)	Driftwood (2001)

Professional ratings
Review scores
Source	Rating
AllMusic	link
Q	4/5 stars
Hi-Fi+	link

Simple Soul is the fifth studio album by Eddi Reader released in the UK on 29 January 2001.

The album is a lot more stripped down than its predecessor, Angels and Electricity being predominantly folk and acoustic based. Many of the songs were co-written with longtime collaborator Boo Hewerdine.

The album came about when Reader wanted to try her new recording equipment mixed with friend and former Fairground Attraction drummer Roy Dodds' new equipment. Twenty-seven songs were recorded in Dodds' studio and whilst the recordings were originally only intended to be demos, Reader was so pleased with the results she decided to keep the intimate and personal sound.

The track "I Felt a Soul Move Through Me" was written about the recent loss of Reader's father.

== Track listing ==
1. "Wolves" (Boo Hewerdine, Eddi Reader, Teddy Borowiecki) – 4:30
2. "The Wanting Kind" (Boo Hewerdine, Eddi Reader) – 3:55
3. "Lucky Penny" (Boo Hewerdine, Eddi Reader) – 3:30
4. "Simple Soul" (Boo Hewerdine, Eddi Reader) – 4:17
5. "Adam" (Roy Dodds, Adam Kirk, Boo Hewerdine, Eddi Reader)- 4:33
6. "Footsteps Fall" (Boo Hewerdine, Annette Bjergfeldt) – 2:45
7. "Blues Run the Game" (Jackson C. Frank) – 5:02
8. "I Felt a Soul Move Through Me" (Graham Henderson, Boo Hewerdine, Eddi Reader, Roy Dodds) – 3:50
9. "Prodigal Daughter" (Boo Hewerdine, Eddi Reader) – 3:39
10. "Eden" (Eddi Reader) – 5:03
11. "The Girl Who Fell in Love with the Moon" (Boo Hewerdine, Jacob Eriksen) – 3:19

== Personnel ==
- Eddi Reader – vocals, backing vocals, acoustic guitar
- Boo Hewerdine – acoustic guitar, backing vocals, glockenspiel, tambura, toy keyboard, harmonium
- Teddy Borowiecki – keyboards, accordion, Indian harmonium, tambura, whirly tube
- Tim Harries – bass guitar
- Roy Dodds – drums, percussion
- Dylan Bates – violin
- Simon Edwards – guitaron
- Adam Kirk – dobro, acoustic and electric guitars
- Dawson Salah Miller – frame drum, udu
- Johnny Scott – pedal steel, acoustic guitar
