= Heidi Talbot =

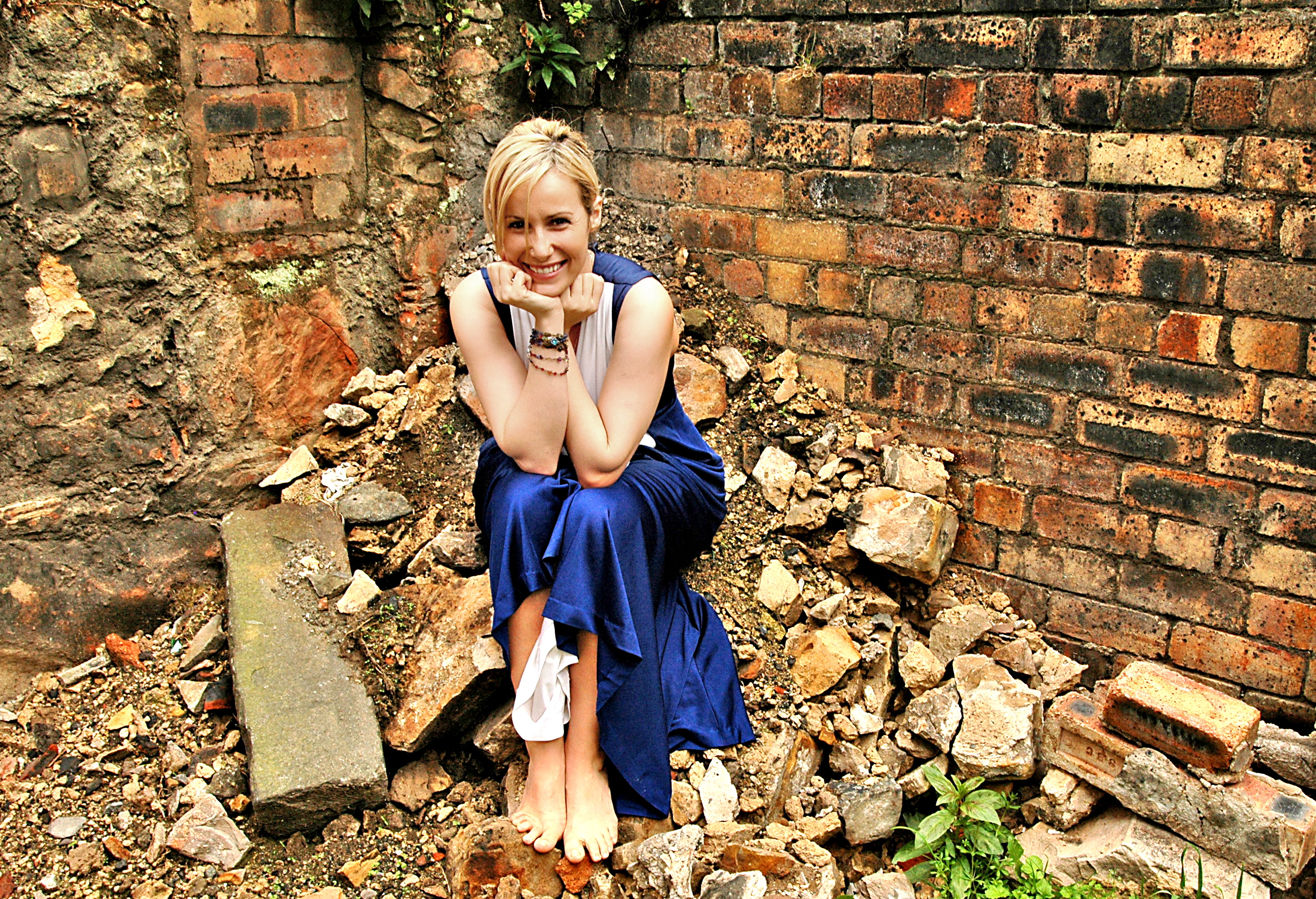

Background information
- Born: May 1980 (age 46)
- Origin: County Kildare, Ireland
- Genre: Folk music
- Instruments: Voice, Guitar, Ukulele
- Formerly of: Cherish the Ladies

Heidi Talbot (born 1980) is an Irish folk singer from Kill, County Kildare, Ireland. Talbot is a former singer of Irish-American musical group Cherish the Ladies.

== Early life and education ==
Born in the rural village of Kill, County Kildare, Ireland, Talbot began singing in the church choir run by her mother. At sixteen, she enrolled at Dublin's Bel Canto singing school, studying for the next year and a half under its founder and director Frank Merriman.

== Singing career ==
When she was 18, Heidi moved to New York, where she spent two years working in bars and clubs before being invited to join Cherish the Ladies in 2002. In between the band's touring schedule, Talbot continued to develop her solo work, releasing Distant Future on Nashville roots label Compass Records. Produced by John Doyle, the record featured such guests as multi-instrumentalist Dirk Powell, concertinist John Williams and fiddler Rayna Gellert. Three years later, the recording of In Love and Light coincided with her decision to leave Cherish the Ladies at the end of 2007.

After the launch of In Love and Light at Glasgow's Celtic Connections festival in January 2008, Talbot featured as a guest on albums by Radiohead drummer Philip Selway, and the new trio collaboration of John McCusker, Kris Drever and Roddy Woomble. She has also sung on records by Eddi Reader, Boo Hewerdine, and Idlewild. Heidi's album 'Angels Without Wings', is an album of original folk songs with guest contributions from Mark Knopfler, Jerry Douglas, King Creosote, Julie Fowlis, and Tim O'Brien.

== Awards ==
In Love and Light won an Indie Acoustic award for best album in 2008 and was nominated for an Irish Music Award 2009 in the best female vocalist category.

In 2023, Heidi Talbot won Composer of the Year at the prestigious Scots Trad Music Awards.

== Personal life ==
Talbot lives in the suburbs of Edinburgh. She was married to musician John McCusker for 11 years; they have two daughters, Molly Mae and Jessica. She married Scottish lawyer Ronnie Simpson in May 2024.

== Discography ==
=== Solo albums ===
- Heidi Talbot (2002)
- Distant Future (2004)
- In Love and Light (2008)
- The Last Star (2010)
- My Sister the Moon EP (2012)
- Angels Without Wings (2013)
- Here We Go 1, 2, 3 (2016)
- Sing It for a Lifetime (2022)

=== with Cherish the Ladies ===
- On Christmas Night (2004)
- Woman of the House (2005)

=== with John McCusker ===
- Love is the Bridge Between Two Hearts EP (2018)

=== with Arcade (Adam Holmes) ===
- Face the Fall (2019)

=== with Roger Tallroth, Sophia Stinnerbom and Magnus Stinnerbom ===
- A Light in the Dark (2019)

=== Other appearances ===
- Before the Ruin - Kris Drever, John McCusker & Roddy Woomble (2008)
- An Cailín Rua - Kathleen Boyle (2008)
- Post Electric Blues - Idlewild (2009)
- Love is the Way - Eddi Reader (2009)
- God Bless The Pretty Things - Boo Hewerdine (2009)
- Mark the Hard Earth - Kris Drever (2010)
- Aurora - Michael McGoldrick (2010)
- The Mark Radcliffe Folk Sessions (2013)
- Flat Earth Society (on the track Old Miss Partridge) - West of Eden (2019)
- Mosaic - Matt Rollings (2020)
