= Driftwood (album) =

Studio album by Eddi Reader
- Released: 8 October 2001
- Studio: Driftwood Studios, London
- Genre: Folk
- Length: 48:53
- Label: Eddi Reader
- Producer: Eddi Reader; Roy Dodds; Boo Hewerdine

Eddi Reader chronology
Simple Soul (2001)	Driftwood (2001)	Sings the Songs of Robert Burns (2003)

Professional ratings
Review scores
Source	Rating
AllMusic	4/5 stars

Driftwood is the sixth studio album by Eddi Reader released in the UK on 8 October 2001.

Driftwood is also the name of the recording studios, owned by Roy Dodds, where the tracks were all recorded during the same sessions for the previous album Simple Soul.

The album has a somewhat unusual status as being almost an album of outtakes although critics and fans regarded it as a bona fide and worthy follow-up album in its own right.

The album was released independently by Reader herself and initially sold at the Simple Soul autumn 2001 tour dates. It can now be purchased via Eddi's official website.

A couple of the tracks are available on other albums as different versions. "Curragh of Kildare" would later resurface as "The winter it is past" on the Sings the Songs of Robert Burns album whilst "Old Soul" was a reworking of "I felt a soul move through me" from Simple Soul.

"Wasting time" is a Ron Sexsmith song from his self-titled 1995 album. Sexsmith had previously written "On a Whim" specifically for Reader which appeared on her 1998 album "Angels and Electricity".

"Good girl" was written for and used in the BBC drama "Real Women".

== Track listing ==
1. "Old Soul" (Eddi Reader, Boo Hewerdine, Roy Dodds, Graham Henderson) – 5:55
2. "Sarasota" (Eddi Reader, Boo Hewerdine) – 3:22
3. "Meantime" (Eddi Reader, Boo Hewerdine, Calum MacColl, Roy Dodds) – 4:23
4. "Curragh of Kildare" (trad. arr. Eddi Reader) – 3:43
5. "Good Girl" (Eddi Reader) – 4:11
6. "Wasting Time" (Ron Sexsmith) – 4:36
7. "Paper Wings" (Gillian Welch, David Rawlings) – 3:21
8. "Holiday" (Eddi Reader, Boo Hewerdine) – 2:50
9. "Small Soul Sailing" (Eddi Reader) – 5:43
10. "New Pretender" (Boo Hewerdine) – 2:59
11. "Forgive the Boy" (Eddi Reader, Boo Hewerdine) – 4:11
12. "Everything" (Eddi Reader, Boo Hewerdine, Calum MacColl, Roy Dodds) – 3:37

== Personnel ==
- Eddi Reader – vocals, backing vocals, acoustic guitar
- Boo Hewerdine – acoustic guitar, backing vocals
- Teddy Borowiecki – keyboards, accordion, Indian harmonium
- Tim Harries – bass guitar
- Roy Dodds – drums, percussion
- Adam Kirk – dobro, acoustic and electric guitars
- Dawson Salah Miller – frame drum, udu
- Johnny Scott – pedal steel, acoustic guitar
- Clive Gregson – acoustic guitar
- Calum MacColl – guitar
