= Peacetime (album) =

Studio album by Eddi Reader
- Released: UK: 29 January 2007; US: March 2007
- Studio: Pure Records Studio, Yorkshire
- Genre: Folk
- Length: 52:56
- Label: Rough Trade
- Producer: John McCusker

Eddi Reader chronology
Sings the Songs of Robert Burns (2003)	Peacetime (2007)	The Songs of Robert Burns Deluxe Edition (2009)

Professional ratings
Review scores
Source	Rating
AllMusic	3.5/5 stars
The Guardian	Robin Denselow
BBC	not rated Sue Keogh
The Scotsman	Fiona Shepherd

Peacetime is the eighth studio album by Eddi Reader released in the UK on 29 January 2007.

The album was promoted the following month by a full UK tour with her own band including John McCusker, Boo Hewerdine, Kevin McGuire, Alan Kelly and Roy Dodds.

Eddi says the album started with a desire to work with some of the UK's amazing traditional folk musicians and some contemporary players who she considers the best in their field. "They are free from the normal music business eccentricities and attitude that I associate with the pop industry," she explains.

"They are like old New Orleans jazz players in their lack of ego and interest in making a complete sound with whoever is in the room." "I wanted to inject some soul into some of the old songs. I wanted to record, play with them like they were brand new, revealing the heart within them."

She also has written some new songs: "I wanted to hear what these musicians would do with them; I was inviting them into my world as I stepped into theirs. As a result the modern songs have a real traditional thread going through them, making it all hopefully ... just music not labelled folk or contemporary or singer-songwriter or jazz!"

== Track listing ==
1. "Baron's Heir and Sadenia's Air" (John McCusker) – 4:25
2. "Muddy Water" (Boo Hewerdine) – 3:34
3. "Mary and the Soldier" (Traditional) – 3:36
4. "Aye Waukin-O" (Traditional) – 4:03
5. "Prisons" (John Douglas) – 2:38
6. "The Shepherd's Song" (Traditional; lyrics by Eddi Reader and John Douglas) – 3:36
7. "Ye Banks and Braes O' Bonnie Doon" (Robert Burns) – 3:35
8. "Should I Pray?" (John Douglas) – 3:17
9. "The Afton" (Johnny Dillon) – 4:37
10. "Leezie Lindsay" (Traditional, Robert Burns, Eddi Reader, Boo Hewerdine) – 4:46
11. "Safe As Houses" (Eddi Reader, Boo Hewerdine) – 3:52
12. "Galileo (Someone Like You)" (Declan O'Rourke) – 3:10
13. "Peacetime" (Boo Hewerdine) – 7:40
14. "The Calton Weaver or Nancy Whisky" (Traditional) – hidden bonus track

== Personnel ==
- Eddi Reader – vocals, guitar
- John McCusker – fiddle, cittern, piano, tenor guitar, keyboards
- Boo Hewerdine – guitars
- Ian Carr – guitars
- John Douglas – guitars, backing vocals
- Roy Dodds – drums, percussion
- Ewen Vernal – double bass
- Kevin McGuire – double bass
- Alan Kelly – accordion
- Michael McGoldrick – flute, whistles, pipes
