= Eureka (The Bible album) =

Studio album by the Bible
- Released: 1988
- Recorded: 1988
- Genre: Pop, pop rock
- Label: Chrysalis
- Producer: Steve Earle

The Bible chronology
Walking the Ghost Back Home (1986)	Eureka (1988)	The Bible (1989)

Eureka is the second album by the English band the Bible, released in 1988. "Crystal Palace" and "Honey Be Good" were released as singles. The album peaked at No. 71 on the Official Albums Chart. The band supported Eureka with a European tour.

== Production ==
The Bible dealt with contractual issues after the release of their debut album and also abandoned their initial attempt at a second album. Recorded in early 1988 in London, Eureka was produced by Steve Earle, the first time he had taken an outside production assignment; he also played on "November Brides" and "Red Hollywood". The Bible expanded from the duo of Boo Hewerdine and Tony Shepherd to include four additional members. "Red Hollywood" is about the end of a romantic relationship. "November Brides" concerns a woman who longs to get married.

== Critical reception ==
Professional ratings
Review scores
Source	Rating
AllMusic	3/5 stars
Bootle Times	4/10
Rolling Stone	3.5/5 stars
The Virgin Encyclopedia of Eighties Music	3/5 stars
The Windsor Star	B

The Windsor Star said that "Hewerdine's vocals are reminiscent of Jim Kerr of Simple Minds, a deep, clear-throated tenor that is a nice counterpoint to some of the twangy tendencies in the music." The St Neots Weekly News called the album "mature pop music, skillfully crafted, excellently played, and elegantly delivered." The Independent concluded that "the boys are sensitive, but it is an aesthete's sensitivity rather than anything to do with pain... Accomplished enough, but too comfortable by half."

The Mansfield and Ashfield Recorder praised the album's "carefully placed series of hooks." Rolling Stone deemed most of the album "sumptuous pop", stating that it is "all about nice chops tastefully deployed". The Bootle Times dismissed it as "bland, although some of the musicianship is fairly professional." The News-Pilot labeled Eureka "a stately brand of piano-based pop-rock".

AllMusic opined, "One keeps waiting for the Bible to focus in on musical and lyrical moments that will help define them, but things remain cloudy, and finally the record just floats away." Trouser Press noted that Eureka "has pretty moments, but also suffers from a real lack of rhythmic dynamism; the songs tend to plod on too long."

== Track listing ==
No.	Title	Length
1.	"Skywriting"
2.	"Honey Be Good"
3.	"Skeleton Crew"
4.	"November Brides"
5.	"Cigarette Girls"
6.	"White Feathers"
7.	"Crystal Palace"
8.	"The Wishing Good"
9.	"Red Hollywood"
10.	"Tiny Lights"
11.	"Blue Shoe Stepping"
12.	"Up in Smoke"
