= Charlie Is My Darling (song) =

Traditional Scots song

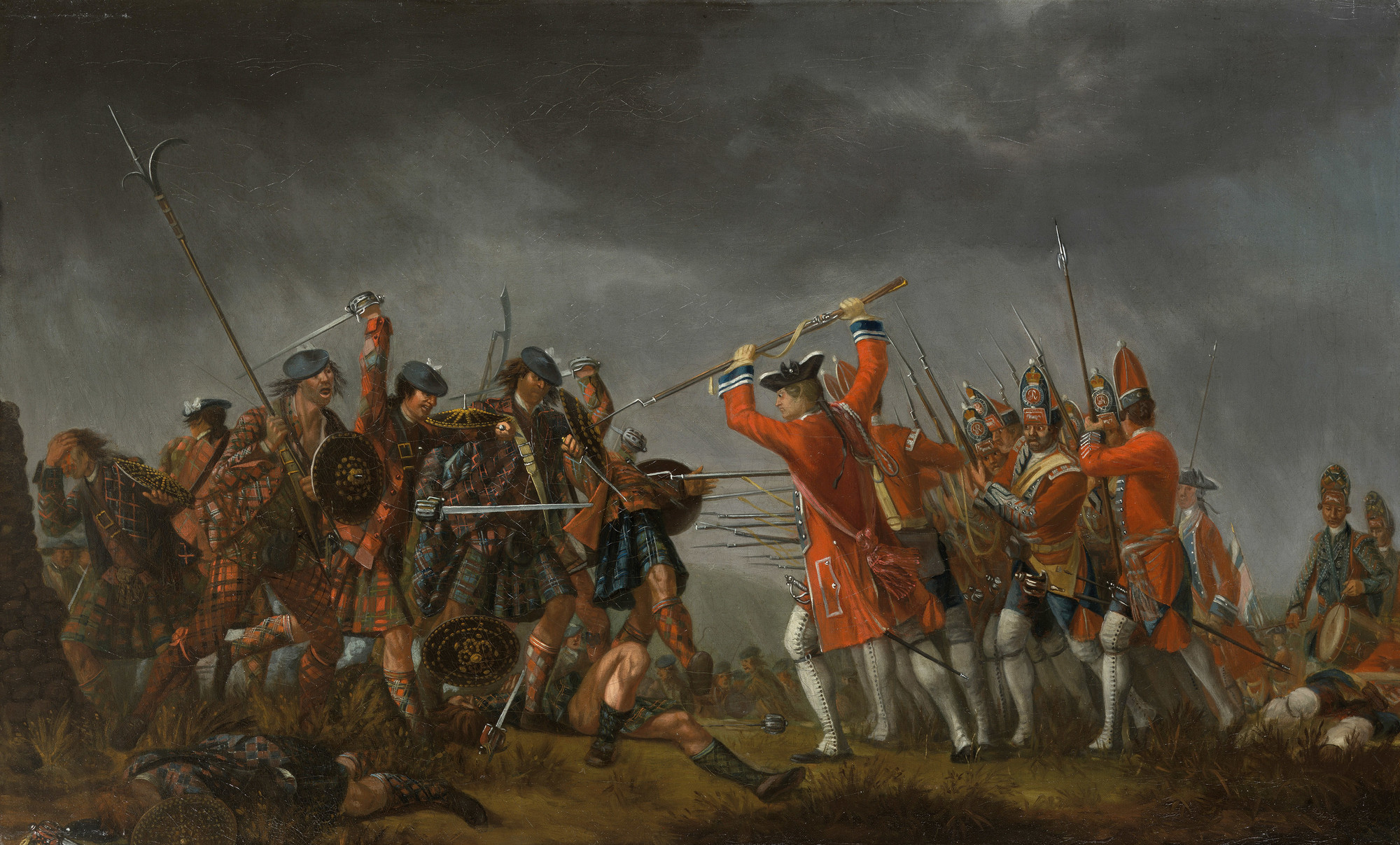
The Battle of Culloden marks the end of the Jacobite rising of 1745

"Charlie Is My Darling" is the title of a number of traditional Scots songs.

The first is attributed variously to James Hogg or Carolina Oliphant (Lady Nairne). A second later song of the same name is attributed to Charles Gray.

All known versions of the song refer to the figure of Bonnie Prince Charlie of Scotland (Charles Edward Stuart).

The earlier versions focus on Charles as a patriotic hero of Scotland during the Jacobite revolts of the 18th century, and it describes the arrival of Charles, referred to as "the Young Chevalier", to the Highlands, being received with joy and celebration by the townspeople, who came to his encounter while playing Scottish music and wearing traditional attires, the men getting ready to leave their houses and families to join the revolution.

A later version of the song by Robert Burns contains lyrics that mean to poke fun at Charles' womanizing reputation. Burns' version of the lyrics are, in comparison to the earlier ones, considered to be fairly risquée for the times, with a narrative that alludes to the amorous adventures of Charles with the Scottish women of the towns he visits during his battles.

Eddi Reader has recorded a version of this one on her CD of Burns' songs.

There is an arrangement by Ludwig van Beethoven, "Charlie is my darling", WoO. 157 (12 songs of various nationalities) no. 3 (1819).

The song is considered to be one of the best known art pieces to represent the Jacobite movements of Scotland. It has also been adapted during the American Civil War as "Johny is my Darling", a variation on Charlie.

== Modern adaptations ==
Roger Quilter's setting of the Burns version of the song was included in the Arnold Book of Old Songs, published in 1950.

The song was also parodied on BBC Radio Scotland, by comedy group Flying Pig Productions in their show Desperate Fishwives. The title was switched to "Darling is a Charlie", referring to the trials and tribulations of the then current (2008–2010) Chancellor of the Exchequer, Alistair Darling.

Another parody of the song is heard in the "Charlie X" episode of the classic series Star Trek, in which Lt. Uhura sings a special version (with lyrics adapted to the plot) as Mr. Spock accompanies her on the Vulcan lyre.

The title was used by the Rolling Stones in their 1966 documentary Charlie Is My Darling. The lyrics to this song were changed by composer Dimitri Tiomkin and featured in the 1950 movie called "Dakota Lil"; it was given the Jazz treatment and sung by Anita Ellis, who dubbed for actress Marie Windsor, who played the title lead.

The song is also in the educational computer game The Oregon Trail, where it is featured at Soda Springs as the song which plays there, as each location of note has an accompanying song.

The tune has also been used to introduce Charles Hawtrey, when he enters a scene in the movie Carry On Camping.

== Lyrics ==
Jacobite Relics contains two sets of lyrics for Charlie Is My Darling: one labeled "modern" and one "original". The lyrics of both are as follows:

=== Modern ===
'Twas on a Monday morning,
Right early in the year,
That Charlie came to our town,
The young Chevalier.

Chorus:
And Charlie he's my darling,
My darling, my darling,
And Charlie he's my darling,
The young Chevalier.

As Charlie he came up the gate,
His face shone like the day:
I grat to see the lad come back,
That had been lang away.

(Chorus)

And ilka bonny lassie sang,
As to the door she ran,
Our king shall hae his ain again,
And Charlie is the man.

(Chorus)

Out-owre yon moory mountain,
And down yon craigy glen,
Of naething else our lasses sing,
But Charlie and his men.

(Chorus)

Our Highland hearts are true and leal,
And glow without a stain;
Our Highland swords are metal keen,
And Charlie he's our ain.

(Chorus)

=== Original ===
'Twas on a Monday morning,
Right early in the year,
That Charlie came to our town,
The young Chevalier.

Chorus:
And Charlie he's my darling,
My darling, my darling,
And Charlie he's my darling,
The young Chevalier.

As he was walking up the street,
The city for to view,
O there he spied a bonny lass,
The window looking through.

(Chorus)

Sae light's he jumped up the stair,
And tirled at the pin;
And wha sae ready as hersel
To let the laddie in!

(Chorus)

He set his Jenny on his knee,
All in his Highland dress;
For brawly weel he kend the way
To please a bonny lass.

(Chorus)

It's up yon heathery mountain,
And down yon scroggy glen,
We daurna gang a-milking
For Charlie and his men.

(Chorus)
