= Trouble No More =

Trouble No More may refer to:

- Trouble No More (John Mellencamp album), 2003
- Trouble No More (Darden Smith album), 1990
- "Trouble No More" (song), a 1955 song by Muddy Waters
- The Bootleg Series Vol. 13: Trouble No More 1979–1981, a 2017 album by Bob Dylan
- Trouble No More: 50th Anniversary Collection, a 2020 album by the Allman Brothers Band
