= Little Victories =

Little Victories may refer to:

- Little Victories (Darden Smith album), 1993
- Little Victories (Beccy Cole album), 2003
- Little Victories (Strypes album), 2015
- Little Victories (Chris Knight album), 2012
- "Little Victories" (Bob Seger song), the 1982 B-side of "Even Now"
- Little Victories (film), a Canadian short drama film

== See also ==
- "Small Victories", an episode from the television series Stargate SG-1
