= Clive Gregson =

English musician (born 1955)

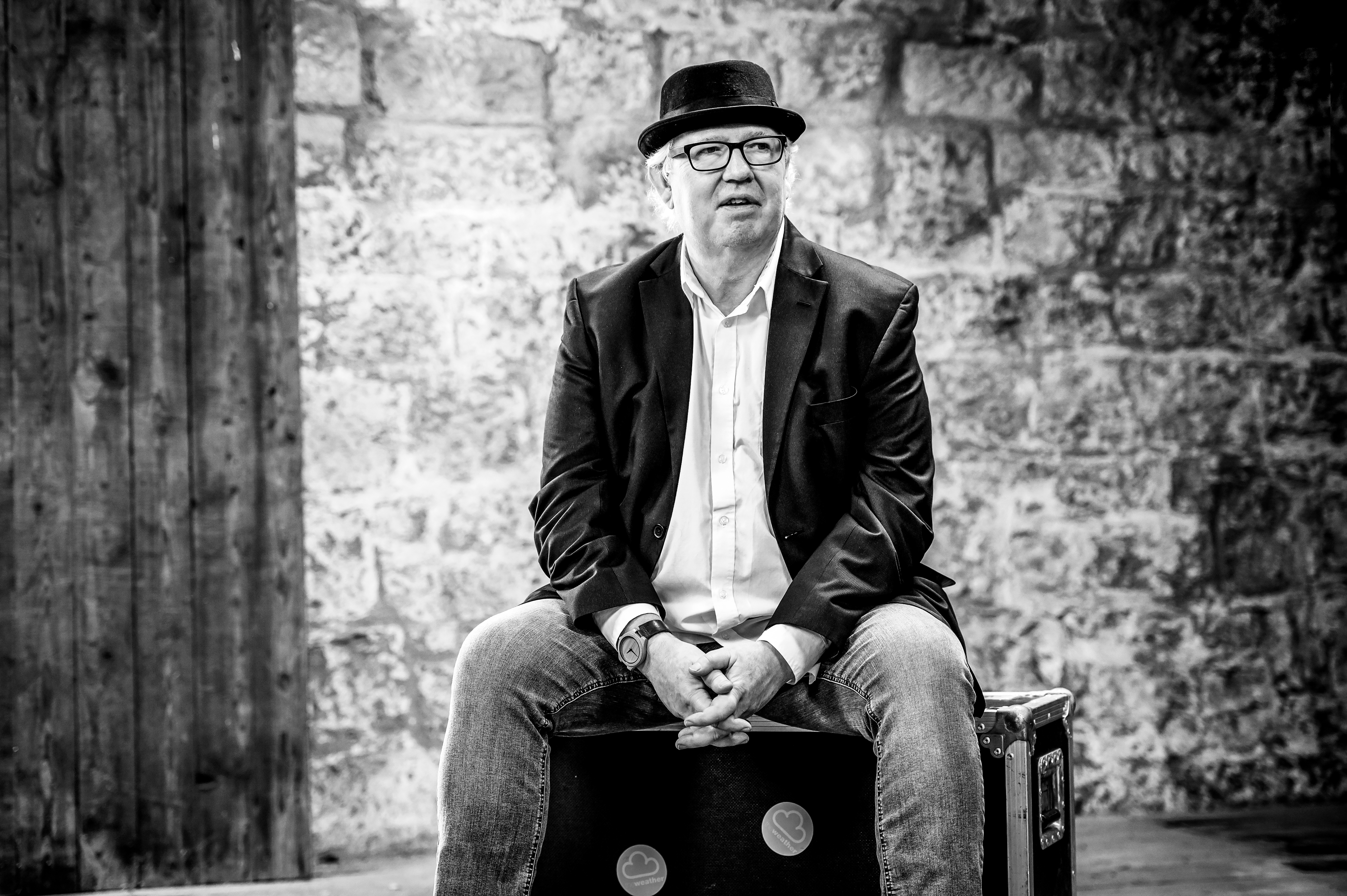

Background information
- Born: Clive James Gregson; 4 January 1955 (age 70)
- Origin: Ashton-under-Lyne, Tameside, England
- Genres: Rock; folk; folk-rock; pop
- Occupations: Musician; songwriter; producer
- Instruments: Guitar; mandolin; keyboards; vocals
- Years active: 1975–present
- Labels: Stiff; Cooking Vinyl; Special Delivery
- Member of: The Guilty Men
- Formerly of: Any Trouble; Plainsong; 3 Boxes
- Website: www.clivegregson.com

Clive James Gregson (born 4 January 1955, Ashton-under-Lyne, Tameside, England) is an English singer-songwriter, musician and record producer. He has toured in bands, provided backup for well-known musicians, and written songs that have been covered by Kim Carnes, Norma Waterson and Nanci Griffith. He is featured in Hugh Gregory's 2002 book 1,000 Great Guitarists.

== Background ==
Clive Gregson was born and raised in Ashton-under-Lyne, Greater Manchester, England. His earliest musical influence was the Beatles in the early 1960s. It was around this time that he received his first guitar as a present from his parents, using the proceeds from the sale of his older brother's unwanted drum kit.

Gregson played in a band at school but played his first professional gig with Any Trouble, the band he formed in Crewe, England with college friends around 1975.

Going professional after Any Trouble signed a recording contract, Gregson has continued as a working musician. Gregson and Manx singer, Christine Collister, together formed folk-rock duo Gregson & Collister, and produced a number of CD albums. After the band's demise, Gregson went on to perform solo.

In 1993, Gregson relocated from the UK to Nashville, United States. In 2003, his career suffered a hiatus of several months after he broke his arm and shoulder in a fall from a ladder. He made a full recovery and continues to record and tour extensively in countries including the UK and Japan from his new base in Houston, Texas.

Gregson cites a wide range of musical influences and tastes and has stated that his all-time favourite record is Nick Drake's Pink Moon.

== Career ==
=== Any Trouble ===
Clive Gregson's professional music career started as he took the role of lead-singer of Any Trouble, the band he had co-founded in the mid 1970s, as well the role of songwriter and rhythm guitarist after co-founder Tom Jackson left. Having recorded and released Gregson's composition Yesterday's Love as an indie single in 1979 Any Trouble began to receive airplay courtesy of BBC Radio 1 DJs John Peel, Andy Peebles and others in the UK. This led to interest from major record labels including WEA, Chrysalis, EMI and Stiff. They selected Stiff "because they were our kind of people".

Any Trouble released three albums on Stiff, including a live album, initially for promotion only, and a further two on EMI America; all were well-received critically, and were accompanied by singles and extensive touring. Despite featuring regularly on radio playlists Any Trouble's popularity wasn't reflected in record sales, and they disbanded in 1984. They re-formed briefly in 2007 to record a new album Life in Reverse, released again through the re-constituted Stiff Records in the UK, playing a headline gig to support it at the Jazz Cafe, London, England.

In November 2013, the band re-formed for a one-off gig at the 229 Club, London, England, in support of the release of the three-CD set The Complete Stiff Recordings 1980–1981

In 2014, they recorded Present Tense, playing a short tour in December 2014, which included Band on the Wall, Manchester, England on 2 December 2014. plus dates in Newcastle upon Tyne, England, Birmingham, England, the 229 Club, London, England, and the Purple Weekend Festival, in León, Spain.

=== Richard Thompson Band ===
While working with Any Trouble, Gregson was introduced to Richard Thompson at the wedding of John Wood, who had produced Any Trouble's debut album and worked on a number of records with Thompson. The meeting led to Gregson's singing backing vocals on the Richard and Linda Thompson album Shoot Out the Lights. This was to be the start of a long association with Richard Thompson during which they recorded and toured together extensively. Gregson introduced Christine Collister to Thompson, resulting in her also joining the Richard Thompson Band.

=== Gregson & Collister ===
In 1984, shortly after the release of Any Trouble's fifth album Wrong End of the Race, Gregson saw vocalist Christine Collister perform at Poynton Folk Club, Cheshire, England. After the demise of Any Trouble, Gregson recorded a solo album (Strange Persuasions) and invited Collister to sing on it. Shortly after this, Richard Thompson asked Gregson to sing on his album Across a Crowded Room; at Gregson's suggestion, Collister was enlisted for vocal duties, leading to her joining the Richard Thompson Band.

The Gregson and Collister musical partnership proved popular and productive, producing five albums and earning them the attribution "the state of the art in British folk-rock" by Rolling Stone. Their albums, whose songs were all written by Gregson, included the low-fi live duo record Home and Away (recorded on a four-track Portastudio cassette recorder), Mischief, featuring a band including Martin Hughes from Any Trouble, A Change in the Weather, and covers album Love Is a Strange Hotel.

By 1992, Gregson and Collister went separate ways after recording a fifth and final album The Last Word; the supporting tour proved to be their most successful. A CD compilation celebrating Gregson's and Collister's career, The Best of Clive Gregson & Christine Collister, was released by Gregson & Collister Recordings through Gott Discs in 2006.

=== Solo again ===
Demand for Gregson's services as a record producer and session musician grew throughout the 1990s. He released Welcome to the Workhouse, his second solo project, in 1990, and by October 1992, was performing as a solo artist. As of January 2015, Gregson had released on CD 10 solo albums and one solo Best of collection plus two digital-only releases: the original recordings for his I Love This Town album and a stand-alone collection of songs recorded by Gregson for Any Trouble's Life in Reverse but not included therein.

In addition to Richard Thompson, he has collaborated with many other artists, including Nanci Griffith (1996–2007), Eddi Reader and Boo Hewerdine, founder member of The Bible (1993 & 1999) and Plainsong (1997). The Gregson, Hewerdine & Reader trio made recordings for an album, although only three songs were released, as a CD EP, including Gregson's Who's Your Jailer Now?

In 2007, Gregson was musical director for the Dennis Locorriere Hits and History Tour, which features on the Hits and History Tour Live DVD. Since 2010, Gregson has become a regular opening act for Jools Holland.

Gregson's reputation as a songwriter has led to his songs being recorded by artists, including Nanci Griffith (I Love This Town), Kim Carnes (Touch and Go), Fairport Convention (Home Is Where the Heart Is), Claire Martin (Could This Be the One?), Norma Waterson (Fred Astaire) and Smokie (Northern Soul). Gregson's I Love This Town was recorded as a duet by Nanci Griffith and Jimmy Buffett in 2006, becoming a radio hit in the UK and U.S.

Gregson has shared his guitar expertise at the adult music camps California Coast Music Camp and Puget Sound Guitar Workshop in Washington State over several summers.

=== 3 Boxes ===
In 2011, Gregson joined forces with guitarist Mark Griffiths and Andy Roberts to form 3 Boxes, an instrumental guitar trio, to play a series of gigs and record an album of original material. The three had worked together in the group Plainsong in 1999.

In 2013, 3 Boxes released their only album to date Strings Attached, including only material written by the three members, all instrumentals for three acoustic guitars recorded live in the studio by producer John Wood.

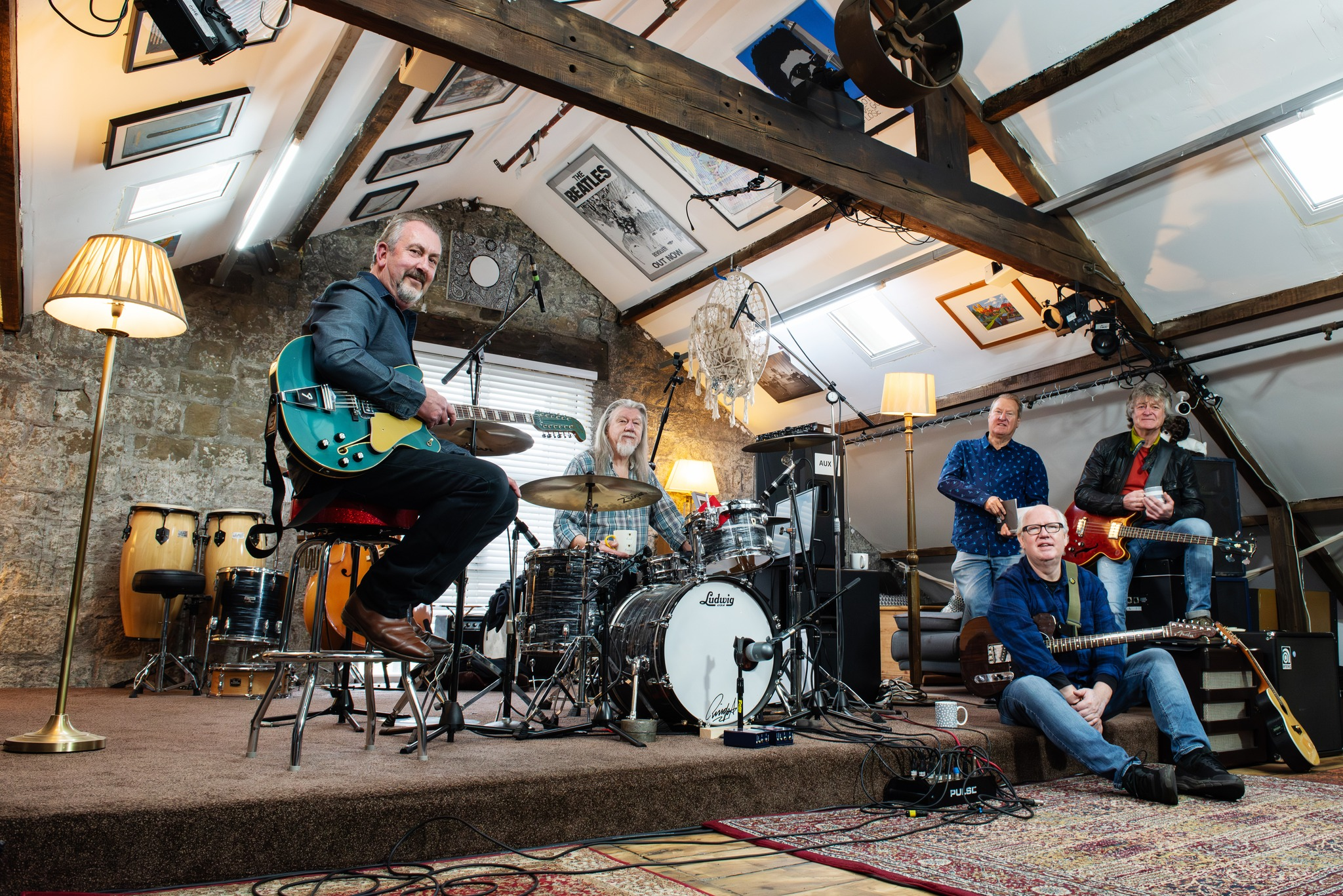

=== The Guilty Men ===
Gregson formed the Manchester UK based group The Guilty Men in 2022 with long-time friend guitarist and singer Neil Cossar (The Cheaters), drummer Paul Burgess from 10cc and bassist and singer Craig Fletcher and Keyboardist and singer Jez Smith from Barclay James Harvest. Their debut album Invisible Confetti recorded during 2023 is released in September 2024.

== Discography ==
=== Any Trouble ===
==== Albums ====
- Where Are All the Nice Girls? (1980, produced by John Wood, Any Trouble, Bob Sargeant)
- Wheels in Motion (1981, produced by Mike Howlett)
- Live at the Venue (1981, produced by Barry 'Bazza' Farmer, initially promotional only)
- Any Trouble (1983, produced by David Kershenbaum)
- Wrong End of the Race (1984, produced by John Wood & Will Birch)
- Girls Are Always Right - The Stiff Years (2002, produced by Any Trouble, John Wood, Bazza, Bob Sargeant, Mike Howlett, Martin Levan)
- Life in Reverse (2007, produced by John Wood)
- The Complete Stiff Recordings 1980–81 (2013)
- Present Tense (2015, Cherry Red)

==== Singles ====
- "Yesterday’s Love" (1980, Stiff Records)
- "Second Choice" (1980, Stiff Records)
- "Girls Are Always Right" (1980, Stiff Records)
- "Dimming of the Day" (1981, Stiff Records, only released in France)
- "Trouble with Love" (1981, Stiff Records)
- "Touch and Go" (1983, EMI America)
- "I’ll Be Your Man" (1983, EMI America)
- "Baby, Now That I’ve Found You" (1984, EMI America)
- "Open Fire" (1984, EMI America)
- "That Sound" (2007, Stiff Records)

=== Clive Gregson ===
==== Albums ====
- Strange Persuasions (1985, produced by Clive Gregson)
- Welcome to the Workhouse (1990, produced by Clive Gregson & John Wood)
- Carousel of Noise (1994, produced by Clive Gregson)
- People & Places (1995, produced by Clive Gregson)
- I Love This Town (1996, produced by Garry West with Clive Gregson)
- Anorak (1998 (12 track fan club release, produced by Clive Gregson)
- Happy Hour (1999, produced by Clive Gregson)
- Comfort & Joy (2001, produced by Clive Gregson)
- Long Story Short (2004, produced by Clive Gregson)
- The Best of Clive Gregson (2009, compilation, produced by Clive Gregson)
- I Love This Town, Take One (2010, download-only release, produced by Clive Gregson)
- Forward into Reverse (2010, produced by Clive Gregson)
- Bittersweet (2011, produced by Clive Gregson)
- This Is Now (2013, produced by Clive Gregson)
- Underwater Dancing (2017, Clive Gregson & Liz Simcock)
- One Year (2020-01)
- Raggedy Ass (2020-02)
- Eighteen Strings (2020-03)
- Every Face Is Turned My Way (2020-04)
- Poorville (2020-05)
- Bus Stop Conversations (2020-06)
- People & Places Revisited (2020-07)
- It's Only Love (2020-08)

==== Singles ====
- "Home Is Where the Heart Is" (1985, Demon Records)

=== Gregson & Collister ===
==== Albums ====
- Home and Away (1987, produced by Clive Gregson)
- Mischief (1987, produced by Clive Gregson)
- A Change in the Weather (1989, produced by Clive Gregson)
- Love Is a Strange Hotel (1990, produced by Clive Gregson & Christine Collister)
- The Last Word (1992, produced Clive Gregson)
- The Best of Gregson & Collister (2007, produced by Clive Gregson & Christine Collister)

==== Singles ====
- "I Wouldn't Treat a Dog" (1987, Special Delivery Records, 3 track 12")
- "Home Is Where the Heart Is" (2007, Special Delivery Records, produced by Clive Gregson)

=== Gregson, Hewerdine, Reader ===
==== Singles ====
- "Wonderful Lie" (1993, produced by Jon Kelly)

=== Plainsong ===
==== Albums ====
- New Place Now (1999, produced by John Wood)

==== Singles ====
- "Live in Austria" (1997, produced by Oliver Skrube)

=== 3 Boxes ===
==== Albums ====
- Strings Attached (2014, produced by John Wood)

=== The Guilty Men ===
==== Albums ====
- Invisible Confetti (2024, produced by Clive Gregson)
