= Sings the Songs of Robert Burns =

2003 album by Eddi Reader

Studio album by Eddi Reader
- Released: UK: 12 May 2003; US: 3 February 2004
- Studio: CaVa Studios, Glasgow
- Genre: Folk
- Length: 45:34
- Label: Rough Trade
- Producer: Boo Hewerdine

Eddi Reader chronology
Driftwood (2001)	Sings the Songs of Robert Burns (2003)	Peacetime (2007)

Professional ratings
Review scores
Source	Rating
AllMusic	link
PopMatters	not rated link
Daily Telegraph	CD of the year
BBC	not rated link

Sings the Songs of Robert Burns is the seventh studio album by Eddi Reader. It was released in the UK on 12 May 2003.

The album was premiered at the Glasgow Royal Concert Hall as part of the Celtic Connections Festival in January 2003 and on release garnered Reader some of the best reviews of her career.

Reader explained how the album came about in the extensive liner notes, how when her family was relocated to the Ayrshire town of Irvine (Burns was from Ayrshire), how it "saved my life to be introduced to an alternative Scottish beauty and language... I often thought Robert Burns was for the highbrow and not the likes of me, the hardly educated, council estate, overspill girl. Now I see that I was wrong and that I am precisely the person Burns wrote for."

Reader says she has discovered in Robert Burns something she believes has been overlooked in the approach to his work, and she believes that her interpretations of his poetry will reach more ears than have previously heard him.

She explains: "I sang My Love's Like a Red, Red Rose to a bunch of 'worse for the drink' people in a bar in Glasgow one cold January night and I felt something happening between me and the words and the people listening, something profoundly moving. After all my travels singing songs to people, I recognised this as being a vein of emotional gold as yet unmined ... I began to be spooked by him and started on a journey to find him, Robert, the guy from Ayrshire that I would have drunk with, walked with and probably got into trouble with. I wanted to show him off to everyone, sit folk down and say 'no! no! listen, listen, really listen, listen to this...'"

== Track listing ==
1. "Jamie Come Try Me" (Robert Burns, arranged by Reader, Carr, Cunningham, Hanson, Hewerdine, McCusker, Reid, Vernal) – 4:41
2. "My Love Is Like a Red, Red Rose" (Robert Burns, arranged by Reader) – 3:50
3. "Willie Stewart/Molly Rankin" (Robert Burns, arranged by Reader, Carr, Cunningham, Hewerdine, McCusker, Vernal, Rankin) – 4:18
4. "Ae Fond Kiss" (Robert Burns, arranged by Reader, Carr, Cunningham, Hewerdine, McCusker, Vernal) – 6:35
5. "Brose and Butter" (Robert Burns, arranged by Reader, Carr, Cunningham, Hewerdine, McCusker, Vernal, McGoldrick) – 4:02
6. "Ye Jacobites" (Robert Burns, arranged by Reader, Reid) – 4:03
7. "Wild Mountainside" (John Douglas) – 3:54
8. "Charlie Is My Darling" (Robert Burns, arranged by Reader, Carr, Cunningham, Hewerdine, McCusker, Vernal) – 3:22
9. "John Anderson My Jo" (Robert Burns, arranged by Reader) – 1:52
10. "Winter it is past" (Robert Burns, arranged by Reader) – 4:15
11. "Auld Lang Syne" (Robert Burns, arranged by Reader) – 4:36

== Deluxe edition ==
The songs of Robert Burns Deluxe Edition

Studio album by Eddi Reader
- Released: 12 January 2009
- Recorded: By Robert Rankin at CaVa Studios, Glasgow
- Genre: Folk
- Length: 75:28
- Label: Rough Trade
- Producer: Boo Hewerdine, Eddi Reader

Eddi Reader chronology
Peacetime (2007)	The songs of Robert Burns Deluxe Edition (2009)	Love is the Way (2009)

Deluxe Edition
Review scores
Source	Rating
Sunday Mail	Avril Cadden
The Big Issue	4/5 stars
The List	Donald Reid
thelondonpaper	Link

A new edition of the album, with seven extra tracks, was released in the UK on 12 January 2009. The album was re-released to coincide with the 250th anniversary of the birth of Robert Burns.

Of the seven additional songs, two were from the original 2003 sessions ("Green Grow the Rashes O", "Of A' the Airts"), three were previously available on 2007's Peacetime ("Ye Banks and Braes", "Aye Waukin-O" and "Leezie Lindsay") "Dainty Davie", also from that session was previously unreleased, and "Comin' Thro the Rye/Dram Behind the Curtain" was a brand new recording. "Dram Behind the Curtain" was written by the Scottish Highlands composer and accordionist Mairearad Green.

The album was promoted, like its original release, with two sold-out shows at the Celtic Connections festival in Glasgow. The deluxe edition is dedicated to Kevin McCrae, the Scottish composer, arranger, conductor and cellist, who died in April 2005. McCrae conducted and arranged the strings on the original album. The additional tracks are:

12. "Green Grow the Rashes O" – 4:36
13. "Comin' Through the Rye / Dram Behind the Curtain (Mairearad Green)" – 2:34
14. "Ye Banks and Braes o' Bonnie Doon" (Robert Burns, arr. Reader, McCusker, Hewerdine, Dodds, Kelly, Reid, McGuire) – 3:37
15. "Aye Waukin-O" (Robert Burns, arr. Reader, McCusker, Hewerdine, Carr) – 4:04
16. "Dainty Davie" (Robert Burns, arr. Reader, McCusker) – 5:27
17. "Leezie Lindsay" (Robert Burns, arr. Reader, chorus written by Burns, verses by Reader, Hewerdine) – 4:49
18. "Of A' the Airts" (Robert Burns, arr. Reader, Hanson) – 4:45

== Personnel ==
- Eddi Reader – vocals, acoustic guitar
- Boo Hewerdine – acoustic guitar, backing vocals
- Roy Dodds – percussion, cajon
- Ian Carr – acoustic guitar, piano
- Phil Cunningham – accordion, piano, whistles
- Christine Hanson – cello
- John McCusker – violin, cittern, whistles, backing vocals
- Colin Reid – acoustic guitar
- Kate Rusby – harmony vocals
- Ewen Vernal – double bass
- John Douglas – ukulele
- Stephen Douglas – shakers, Mark's sister's bag
- Anna Massie – fiddle, mandolin
- Hamish Napier – whistle, piano
- Mairearad Green – accordion
- Jenn Butterworth – guitar
- Royal Scottish National Orchestra – strings conducted/arranged by Kevin McCrae

== Certifications ==
Certifications for Sings the Songs of Robert Burns
Region	Certification	Certified units/sales
United Kingdom (BPI)	Silver	60,000^{^}
^{^} Shipments figures based on certification alone.
