= The Bible (band) =

British band

- Origin: England
- Genres: New wave, indie, sophisti-pop, rock, pop
- Years active: 1985–1989, 1993–1994, 2011–present
- Labels: Backs, Chrysalis, Ensign, Cooltempo, Haven Records, Red Grape Records, Cherry Red Records
- Members: Boo Hewerdine; Tony Shepherd; Neill MacColl; Leroy Lendor; Martyn Barker; Kate St. John
- Past members: Kevin Flanagan; Clive Lawson; David Larcombe; Constance Redgrave; Greg Harewood; Callum MacColl

The Bible are an English band. The band released two critically acclaimed albums in the mid-1980s and are best known for the independent chart hits "Graceland" and "Mahalia". Since The Bible's first split in 1990, lead singer Boo Hewerdine has maintained a solo career while the band itself has been intermittently active, with revivals in the 1990s and 2010s.

== History ==
=== Early years and "Walking the Ghost Back Home" (1985–1986) ===
The Bible was formed in 1985 in Cambridge, when former Great Divide frontman Boo Hewerdine teamed up with keyboard player/drummer Tony Shepherd (who had played with jazz bands and drummed for Cambridge bands The Wobbly Jellies and Somewhere in the Foreign Office, the latter of which had featured future satirist Chris Morris on bass). Using Hewerdine's savings and several budget-rate studios, the duo recorded The Bible's debut album Walking the Ghost Back Home with the assistance of bass player Clive Lawson, jazz saxophonist Kevin Flanagan and drummer Dave Larcombe (the latter of failed "Oxbridge Duran Duran" band Roaring Boys).

Walking the Ghost Back Home was released in 1986 on the independent record label Backs Records. The album was well received by music pundits, giving The Bible a top-ten hit on the UK Independent Chart and staying in the chart for ten weeks. This was followed by the first release of "Graceland" as a single, which gave them a minor hit in the UK. After follow-up single "Mahalia" (which reached number 15 on the UK Independent Chart) The Bible was consolidated as a five-piece group. Dave Larcombe was recruited as a full-time drummer (allowing Shepherd to concentrate on keyboards), Larcombe's former Roaring Boys bandmate Neill MacColl (brother of Kirsty MacColl) was recruited as lead guitarist after performing on various Bible B-sides, and Clive Lawson was replaced by a full-time bass guitarist, Leroy Lendor.

=== Chrysalis period: "Eureka", "The Bible" and first split (1987–1990) ===
On the strength of Walking the Ghost Back Home, The Bible signed to Chrysalis Records. "Graceland" was re-mixed for single re-release in February 1987 (though it eventually charted only slightly higher than the original release). Leroy Lendor had left the band at this point, and to cover for him the band brought in former Christian Death bass player Constance Redgrave to play on the remaining tracks on the "Graceland" EP and on 1987 live dates.

By the time The Bible began recording tracks for a second album (initially self-producing with Pete Smith and Owen Morris), the band were without a bass player again. Neill MacColl's brother Calum – a respected multi-instrumentalist from the folk music scene – guested on bass guitar for the sessions. Unsatisfied with their initial work, The Bible ditched the existing new album recordings (some of which would later surface as B-sides) and opted to start again.

At the suggestion of their management, the band recruited American country-rocker Steve Earle as their new producer, and recorded a more successful set of sessions with yet another guest bass player (this time Greg Harewood of Incognito/Soul II Soul/Mirage). These formed the basis for most of the second Bible album, Eureka, released in 1988.

In spite of good reviews, the commercial performance of Eureka was disappointing – the album peaked at number 71 on the UK Albums Chart and its three singles failed to chart. Although the band had begun to record a third album (to be titled Anticlockwise), Chrysalis rejected the initial recordings in favour of repackaging earlier material. Leroy Lendor returned to the band in time for a re-recording of "Graceland" which provided The Bible with their highest charting single to date (reaching number 51 in the UK in April 1989).

Chrysalis then opted to compile the new version of "Graceland" with most of the Eureka tracks as a stopgap album called The Bible, filling out the remaining space on the record with a number of B-sides. As further promotion, the Eureka single "Honey Be Good" was re-released and gave The Bible a second hit later that year, reaching number 54. The additional commercial pressures of being on a larger label did not sit well with Hewerdine, who later recalled "I think I felt under a lot of pressure. There were a lot of people telling me what I should do and I felt very bullied".

In early 1990, The Bible broke up in farcical circumstances. Having flown to Germany to perform "Honey Be Good" on what turned out to be a TV talent show, they lost to a man who performed under the name of Mr Gadget, wore a spinning bowtie with lights on it, and won by 140,000 votes as compared to The Bible's twelve. As Hewerdine later remembered it, "we all took it so personally that we split up."

=== Post-split work and mid-1990s reformation (1990–1994) ===
Having already recorded a duo album with Darden Smith in between previous Bible commitments, Hewerdine now began a solo career. Shepherd moved into music teaching and session playing (among other work, playing keyboards on a number of early Oasis tours), while MacColl and Lendor teamed up with Calum MacColl and drummer/keyboard player Robert Bond III in a new band called Liberty Horses (who released a single album, Joyland, in 1993). In spite of the break-up, relationships between the band members remained fairly amicable: when interviewed in 2013, they would claim to have never really split up, but just to have periodically stopped when the band's money ran out and made it impossible to continue.

In 1994, The Bible reformed (with the lineup of Hewerdine, Shepherd, Larcombe, Lendor and Neill MacColl) for recordings and a tour. The band released the Dreamlife EP in 1994. Tracks for a new album were recorded, including several songs co-written with former Danny Wilson frontman Gary Clark, a songwriting collaborator of Hewerdine's.

Unfortunately, the band's new record deal failed and The Bible split up again before they could complete and release the album. MacColl went on to team up with Gary Clark in the band King L, who released one album (Great Day For Gravity) in 1995, featuring several more Clark/Hewerdine co-writes including "Greedy" and "Last Cigarette". Versions of both of the latter songs (plus the original title track from the Dreamlife EP and a version of the unreleased Bible song "Junk") surfaced on Hewerdine's 1996 solo album Baptist Hospital, which featured several appearances by MacColl (who also guested on the live dates).

In 1999 the proposed third Bible album was finally assembled and released posthumously, under the name of Dodo.

=== Second reformation (2011–present) ===
The various members of The Bible maintained contact over the following decade-and-a-half. During this time Hewerdine continued his solo career and worked with Eddi Reader, while MacColl played with David Gray and Kathryn Williams.

In late 2011, The Bible reunited for two concerts (at the ABC 1/2 in Glasgow on 29 September and The Grand in Clapham, London on 30 September) to promote the new Red Grape Records reissue of Walking the Ghost Back Home. In addition to the promotional dates, they also announced that they were working on new material.

In 2013, Eureka was reissued for its 25th anniversary by Cherry Red Records as a double disc, including B-sides and different mixes. The Bible played two dates in promotion at the Islington Assembly Hall (1 March) and The Met in Bury (15 March), with an unavailable Dave Larcombe now replaced on drums by Martyn Barker (Shriekback, King Swamp) and with former Dream Academy member Kate St John playing saxophones and accordion. A live album recorded at the Bury gig was scheduled for later in the year but has not yet been released. The concerts saw the debut of two new Bible songs, 'Money Spider' and 'Static'. The band were said to be recording a fourth album in 2013, in intermittent sessions "as and when schedules allow".

The band performed a 30th Anniversary concert – originally scheduled for September 2016, but cancelled; the concert took place on 27 January 2017 at Under the Bridge in Fulham.

== Discography ==
=== Albums ===
- Walking the Ghost Back Home (1986), Backs – UK Indie No. 10
- Eureka (1988), Chrysalis – UK No. 71
- Dodo (1999), Haven Records

=== Singles ===
- "Graceland" (1986), Backs – UK No. 87
- "Mahalia" (1986), Backs – UK Indie No. 15
- "Graceland" (1987), Chrysalis – UK No. 86
- "Crystal Palace" (1988), Chrysalis – UK No. 82
- "Honey Be Good" (1988), Chrysalis
- "Skywriting" (1988), Chrysalis
- "Graceland" (new version) (1989), Chrysalis – UK No. 51
- "Honey Be Good" (1989), Chrysalis – UK No. 54
- Dreamlife EP (1994)

=== Compilation albums ===
- The Bible (1989), Chrysalis – UK No. 67
- Random Acts of Kindness (1995), Haven
