= Little Victories (Darden Smith album) =

Studio album by Darden Smith
- Released: 1993
- Label: Columbia
- Producer: Richard Gottehrer

Darden Smith chronology
| Trouble No More (1990) | Little Victories (1993) | Deep Fantastic Blue (1996) |

Little Victories is an album by the American musician Darden Smith, released in 1993. He supported the album by touring with Shawn Colvin. The title track was released as a single, marketed to adult contemporary radio. Little Victories was Smith's final album for Columbia Records.

== Production ==
Recorded in New York City, the album was produced primarily by Richard Gottehrer. Smith's goal was to make a record that would receive radio play. He cowrote some of its songs with Boo Hewerdine; Smith considered most of the songs to be autobiographical. Rosanne Cash duetted with Smith on "Precious Time". Smith wrote "Place in the Sun" after reading Woody Guthrie's Bound for Glory. "Levee Song" was cowritten by Chip Taylor.

== Critical reception ==
Professional ratings
Review scores
| Source | Rating |
|---|---|
| AllMusic | 4/5 stars |
| MusicHound Rock: The Essential Album Guide | 2/5 stars |
| St. Louis Post-Dispatch | B+ |
| The Virginian-Pilot | 3/5 stars |

The Toronto Star praised Smith's "superbly crafted lyrics." The Chicago Tribune wrote that "Smith mixes folk, country and panhandle blues in his musical portraits of real people in the real world." The Vancouver Sun opined that "Little Victories puts Smith in a bit more of a cosmopolitan realm than his pop-country past, and it's pretty darn listenable."

The St. Louis Post-Dispatch noted the "great playing and solid songwriting." The Daily Breeze deemed Smith "one of postmodern country's many unsung songwriters," labeling Little Victories "insightful thought-folk." The Rocky Mountain News admired the "easygoing vocal style, consistent songwriting and a world-wise lyrical point of view."

AllMusic wrote that the album "stands among Smith's most mature and ambitious work."

== Track listing ==
| No. | Title | Length |
|---|---|---|
| 1. | "Place in the Sun" |
| 2. | "Loving Arms" |
| 3. | "Little Victories" |
| 4. | "Love Left Town" |
| 5. | "Hole in the River" |
| 6. | "Dream Intro" |
| 7. | "Dream's a Dream" |
| 8. | "Precious Time" |
| 9. | "Days on End" |
| 10. | "Levee Song" |
| 11. | "Only One Dream" |
