= Candyfloss and Medicine =

Studio album by Eddi Reader
- Released: UK: 8 July 1996; Japan: 25 July 1996; US: 5 July 1997
- Studio: The Snake Ranch, London; Eden Studios, London
- Genre: Pop
- Length: 45:10
- Label: Blanco y Negro
- Producer: Eddi Reader; Teddy Borowiecki

Eddi Reader chronology
Eddi Reader (1994)	Candyfloss and Medicine (1996)	Angels & Electricity (1998)

Professional ratings
Review scores
Source	Rating
AllMusic	4/5 stars

Candyfloss and Medicine is the third studio album by Eddi Reader released in the UK on 8 July 1996, which peaked #24 in the UK charts.

Two singles were released in the UK: "Town Without Pity" and "Medicine" with various additional tracks including two covers from brother Frank's band Trashcan Sinatras: "Earlies" and "Sex Lives" and, nearly a decade before the hugely successful Robert Burns project, "John Anderson My Joe" and "Green Grow the Rashes".

The US release of the album the following year was enhanced by three additional tracks: "Sugar on the Pill", "If You Got a Minute, Baby" and "Shall I Be Mother?" which featured ex-Suede guitarist Bernard Butler. The UK single "Town Without Pity" was dropped for this version.

== Track listing ==
=== UK release ===
1. "Glasgow Star" (Reader, Borowiecki) – 4:51
2. "Town Without Pity" (Dimitri Tiomkin, Ned Washington) – 2:49
3. "Medicine" (Reader, Borowiecki, Hewerdine) – 4:12
4. "Rebel Angel" (Reader, Neill MacColl, Calum MacColl, Roy Dodds) – 4:43
5. "Semi Precious" (Reader, Borowiecki, Hewerdine) – 3:21
6. "Lazy Heart" (Reader, Hewerdine) – 5:25
7. "I Loved a Lad" (Traditional; arranged by Reader) – 5:01
8. "Butterfly Jar" (Reader, Hewerdine, Calum MacColl) – 5:33
9. "Candyfloss" (Hewerdine, Reader) – 3:23
10. "Darkhouse" (Reader, Calum MacColl) – 5:30

=== US release ===
1. "Glasgow Star"
2. "Candyfloss"
3. "Rebel Angel"
4. "Sugar on the Pill"
5. "Semi Precious"
6. "Medicine"
7. "If You Got a Minute, Baby"
8. "Lazy Heart"
9. "Shall I Be Mother?"
10. "Butterfly Jar"
11. "I Loved a Lad"
12. "Darkhouse"

== Personnel ==
- Eddi Reader – vocals, concertina, harmonica, piano
- Boo Hewerdine – acoustic and electric guitars
- Teddy Borowiecki – keyboards, guitar, bass, accordion, melodica, percussion
- Roy Dodds – drums, percussion, hand claps, loop drumming
- Calum MacColl – acoustic and electric guitars, bowed guitar, dulcimer, penny-whistle, zither
- David Piltch – electric and acoustic bass
- Bernard Butler – electric guitar
- Dominic Miller – electric nylon guitar
- Anthony Thistlethwaite – mandolin
- The Electra Strings – strings
- Kat Evans – fiddle, electric violin
- Sid Gauld – trumpet
- Richard Sidwell – trumpet
- Michael Smith – tenor horn
- Annie Whitehead – trombone
- Martin Green – soprano saxophone
- Misses La La – backing vocals
