= Green Grow the Rashes =

1783 poem by Robert Burns

Green Grow the Rashes. A Fragment is a poem by Scottish poet Robert Burns. It was written in 1783 in Burns' commonplace book, and published in 1787 in the Third, or London, edition of Poems, Chiefly in the Scottish Dialect. It is a reworking of an older song with bawdy lyrics.

Later in 1787 it was published with music in The Scots Musical Museum, the first Burns poem printed with music.

English composer Arnold Bax wrote a setting for the poem, dedicating it to the tenor John Coates.

== Recordings ==
The piece has been recorded by many artists as a song, including:

- John Coates for the Gramophone Company (1908)
- Jo Stafford on My Heart's in the Highlands (1954) and again on Songs of Scotland (1957)
- Dougie MacLean on Real Estate (1988) and with Royal Scottish National Orchestra on Till Tomorrow (2014)
- Eddi Reader on Candyfloss and Medicine (1996)
- Tempest on The Gravel Walk (1997)
- Golden Bough on Celtic Love Songs (2009)
