= Mirmama =

Studio album by Eddi Reader
- Released: 1992
- Label: RCA
- Producer: The Patron Saints of Imperfection; Eddi Reader; Roy Dodds; Kevin Moloney

Eddi Reader chronology
Mirmama (1992)	Eddi Reader (1994)

Mirmama is the debut solo studio album by Scottish singer-songwriter Eddi Reader, released by RCA in 1992. The album reached No. 34 on the UK Albums Chart. The album did not receive a US release in 1992, but was later remastered and issued on CD there by Compass Records in 1997.

== Background ==
Following the split of Fairground Attraction, Reader launched her solo career under new management, Douglas Kean of the London-based Interface Management. Fairground Attraction's label, RCA, quickly signed Reader as a solo act before she had recorded any of her own material. For Mirmama, Reader continued working with Fairground Attraction drummer Roy Dodds, alongside other musicians including bassist Phil Steriopulos, guitarist Neil MacColl and multi-instrumentalist Calum MacColl. The combined team were given the name the Patron Saints of Imperfection and the album was recorded in two weeks. Prior to the release of the album, a four-track EP, All or Nothing, was issued in November 1991 to raise awareness of Reader's re-emergence as a solo artist. Although the album achieved critical acclaim, it was considered a commercial disappointment, reaching No. 34 in the UK. The album's single, "What You Do With What You've Got", failed to chart.

== Critical reception ==
Professional ratings
Review scores
Source	Rating
AllMusic	3/5 stars
NME	7/10
Select	4/5 stars

Upon its release, The Guardian wrote, "Mirmama has an irrepressibly good-natured aura about it. Confident and positive, there's nothing brittle about Reader's voice, and the spare, unfussy arrangements hit just the right mood." David Quantick of NME described it as "a reasonably predictable but seriously unduff LP" and "an interesting and likeable record with acoustic guitars on it" for which Reader had written "lots of sort of jazz folk songs". He noted that most of the songs "move at an eccentric but relaxed pace" and added that "blandness is generally avoided by means of Reader's major voice and good tunes". Peter Kinghorn of the Evening Chronicle commented, "The restrained rhythm of her single "What You Do with What You've Got" sets the scene for quality, although not typical of the album." He picked "Honeychild", "Hello in There", "That's Fair", "The Swimming Song" and "My Old Friend the Blues" as the album's other "outstanding" tracks.

Tony Clayton-Lea of the Sunday Tribune considered Mirmama to be "better than Fairground Attraction, because there's a bit to these soft songs of heartache and emotional harassment that was formerly missing". He added, "Reader's voice is as crystal clear as ever, while the songs range in style from country and blues to English folk." Robbert Tilli of Music & Media wrote, "The musical direction on Mirmama is not a radical departure from Reader's past, but it's certainly different. It takes more time to fully absorb the tunes which are all arranged in a relaxing semi-acoustic setting. The overall sound is comparable to Elvis Costello's pike de la resistance King of America, with Edie Brickell and Indigo Girls overtones".

Lynden Barber of The Sydney Morning Herald wrote, "[This] agreeable album consists of a late-night brand of folk rock with a warm, live feel to it. Reader's voice is light on the ear if occasionally too honeyed, her choice of covers is wise, and her own songs are soft and appealing without being bland." Penny Kiley of the Liverpool Echo commented, "Eddi's album can't help sounding like Fairground Attraction. It has her instantly recognisable voice, the mostly acoustic-based sound and the folk-jazz style of song. What it lacks is Mark Nevin's way with melody. The album has a good sound and good words but the extra spark is missing."

In a retrospective review of the album, William Ruhlmann of AllMusic felt Mirmama showed "Reader adopt[ing] an atmospheric folk style somewhat akin to Enya, but not as produced or accessible". He concluded, "The result sounds more like the kind of quirky, side-project solo album that group members make than like the kind of bold solo statement expected from an emerging star."

== Track listing ==
No.	Title	Writer(s)	Length
1.	"What You Do With What You've Got"	Si Kahn, Eddi Reader, Roy Dodds	4:38
2.	"Honeychild"	Reader, Neill MacColl, Dodds, Phil Steriopulos	5:11
3.	"All or Nothing"	Reader	4:52
4.	"Hello in There"	John Prine	4:51
5.	"Dolphins"	Fred Neil	7:06
6.	"The Blacksmith"	Traditional	6:13
7.	"That's Fair"	Reader	4:44
8.	"Cinderella's Downfall"	Reader	4:17
9.	"Pay No Mind"	Reader, Dodds	4:53
10.	"The Swimming Song"	Loudon Wainwright III	1:53
11.	"My Old Friend the Blues"	Steve Earle	3:08

US Compass Records release
No.	Title	Writer(s)	Length
12.	"Broken Vows"	Reader, Dodds	5:09
13.	"The Girl with the Weight of the World in Her Hands"	Emily Saliers	6:52

Japanese RCA Records release
No.	Title	Writer(s)	Length
12.	"Broken Vows"		5:09
13.	"Ole Buttermilk Sky"	Hoagy Carmichael, Jack Brooks	3:36
14.	"I Wish You Were My Boyfriend"	Reader, Dodds	4:22
15.	"The Girl with the Weight of the World in Her Hands"		6:52

Japanese RCA Records 2014 reissue
No.	Title	Writer(s)	Length
16.	"Sunday Morning"	Lou Reed, John Cale	4:14

== Personnel ==
- Eddi Reader – vocals (all tracks), concertina (tracks 3, 11)
- Neill MacColl – guitar (tracks 2 to 7, 9 to 11), piano (track 2), backing vocals (track 2), autoharp (tracks 7, 10), mandolin (track 11)
- Dominic Miller – guitar (tracks 1, 8 to 9)
- Phil Steriopulos – double bass
- Roy Dodds – drums, percussion

Additional musicians

- Huw Warren – cello (tracks 1, 8 to 9), accordion (tracks 8 to 9), piano (tracks 8 to 9), vibraphone (track 9)
- Aly Bain – fiddle (track 1)
- Kim Burton – accordion, Hammond (track 1)
- Jools Holland – Hammond organ (tracks 2 to 3, 7), piano (track 5)
- Calum MacColl – penny whistle (track 3), zither (track 4), dulcimer (track 6)

Production

- The Patron Saints of Imperfection – producers (tracks 2 to 7, 10 to 11), additional production (track 9)
- Eddi Reader, Roy Dodds, Kevin Moloney – producers (tracks 1, 8)
- Thomas Dolby – remix (track 1)
- Phill Brown – mixing (track 8)
- Terry Medhurst – engineer (tracks 1 to 7, 10 to 11)
- Randy LeRoy – remastering (1997 Compass Records CD release)

Other

- Andrew Catlin – front cover photography
- Jill Furmanovsky – inside photography
- Roger Swanborough – art direction
- Eddi Reader – concept
- Carol Walters – layout

== Charts ==
Chart (1992)	Peak position
UK Albums Chart	34
