= Angels & Electricity =

Studio album by Eddi Reader
- Released: UK: 11 May 1998; Japan: 25 June 1998; US: 23 March 1999
- Venue: Britannia Row, The Roundhouse
- Studio: Chipping Norton Recording Studios
- Genre: Folk
- Length: 57:41
- Label: Blanco y Negro
- Producer: Eddi Reader; Boo Hewerdine

Eddi Reader chronology
Candyfloss and Medicine (1996)	Angels & Electricity (1998)	Simple Soul (2001)

Professional ratings
Review scores
Source	Rating
Entertainment Weekly	link
AllMusic	4/5 stars

Angels & Electricity is the fourth studio album by Eddi Reader released in the UK on 11 May 1998.

The album has provided Reader with some of her most popular songs including "Kiteflyer's Hill", "Bell, Book and Candle" and "Please Don’t Ask Me to Dance".

As usual, Reader draws on a number of songwriters including "On a Whim", written for her by Ron Sexsmith, "Kiteflyer's Hill" by ex-Fairground Attraction band member Mark Nevin and long-time musical partner Boo Hewerdine.

The album was to be her last for a major record label, Blanco y Negro (Warners) and Reader would later agree a deal with UK independent label Rough Trade.

== Track listing ==
1. "Kiteflyer’s Hill" (Mark E. Nevin) – 6:06
2. "Prayer Wheel" (Eddi Reader, Boo Hewerdine) – 4:45
3. "Postcard" (Eddi Reader, Calum MacColl) – 4:04
4. "Wings on My Heels" (Boo Hewerdine) – 4:45
5. "On a Whim" (Ron Sexsmith) – 3:09
6. "Hummingbird" (Boo Hewerdine) – 4:35
7. "Barcelona Window" (Eddi Reader, Boo Hewerdine) – 4:17
8. "Bell, Book and Candle" (Boo Hewerdine) – 4:13
9. "California" (Eddi Reader, Boo Hewerdine) – 4:35
10. "Follow My Tears" (Eddi Reader, Boo Hewerdine) – 4:54
11. "Psychic Reader" (Eddi Reader) – 4:13
12. "Please Don’t Ask Me to Dance" (Boo Hewerdine) – 3:24
13. "Clear" (Eddi Reader, Calum MacColl, Roy Dodds) – 4:39

== Personnel ==
- Eddi Reader – vocals, acoustic guitar
- Boo Hewerdine – acoustic guitar, bells, additional vocals
- Teddy Borowiecki – keyboards, melodica
- Tim Harries – bass guitar
- Roy Dodds – drums, percussion, hand claps, loop drumming
- Johnny Scott – pedal steel, guitars, mandolin, dobro
- Calum MacColl – electric, slide and high-strung guitar, dulcimer, zither, thumb piano, additional vocal
- Neill MacColl – electric and acoustic guitars, bells
- Graham Henderson – Hammond organ, keyboards
- The Electra Strings – strings
