= Somebody Else (Big Country song) =

Single by Big Country

from the album Driving to Damascus
- B-side: "Sleep Until Dawn"; "Another Misty Morning"
- Released: 30 May 2000
- Recorded: 1999
- Length: 4:04
- Label: Track Record
- Songwriter(s): Stuart Adamson; Ray Davies
- Producer(s): Rafe McKenna; Big Country

Big Country singles chronology
"See You"/"Perfect World" (1999)	"Somebody Else" (2000)	"Another Country" (2011)

"Somebody Else" is a song by Scottish rock band Big Country, released in May 2000 as the third and final single from their eighth studio album Driving to Damascus (1999). The song was written by Stuart Adamson and Ray Davies, and was produced by Rafe McKenna and Big Country. "Somebody Else" reached number 126 in the UK Singles Chart and was the band's final single release prior to lead vocalist and guitarist Stuart Adamson's suicide in 2001.

== Background ==
"Somebody Else" was one of two songs on Driving to Damascus to be written by Big Country's lead vocalist and guitarist Stuart Adamson with Ray Davies of the Kinks. Davies and Big Country first worked together after Davies approached the band's management in 1997 to ask whether their rhythm section, bassist Tony Butler and drummer Mark Brzezicki, were available to back him at his upcoming performance at Glastonbury Festival. Big Country's manager Ian Grant used the opportunity to get the entire band involved, although guitarist Bruce Watson was unable to take part due to other engagements. After rehearsals in Cornwall, the three members of Big Country backed Davies at Glastonbury and a friendship was established, with Davies expressing interest in further collaborations with the band. He also attempted to get them signed to the US label Velvel Records, although this ultimately did not come to fruition.

Big Country began writing and working on new material from late 1997 and by September 1998, the band had approximately 30 new songs. Davies, who had attended some of the band's rehearsals and sessions, felt these "weren't quite there" and suggested Adamson come over to his apartment in New York to write together. The collaboration resulted in "Somebody Else", "Devil in the Eye" and a third, uncompleted song being written in December 1998. Both completed songs were recorded by Big Country in 1999 for their eighth studio album, Driving to Damascus. Speaking of his collaboration with Davies, Adamson commented in 1999, "Both Ray and I pushed each other into areas we wouldn't normally go."

In 2006, bassist Tony Butler considered "Somebody Else" to be "superb lyrically". The song has been described as being about a "splitting couple dividing up old possessions".

== Release ==
"Somebody Else" was released in the UK on 30 May 2000 as a farewell single and to coincide with the band's UK tour, "The Final Fling". Originally scheduled for release on 22 May, the CD single was limited to 5,000 copies. Two previously unreleased tracks were included on the single, "Sleep Until Dawn" and "Another Misty Morning". The latter, which was written by bassist Tony Butler, who also sang lead vocals on the track, is a song about masturbation.

To promote the single, the band performed the song on the BBC TV programme Weekend Watchdog on 26 May 2000.

== Critical reception ==
In a review of Driving to Damascus, Aaron Badgley of AllMusic praised "Somebody Else" as "brilliant" and added, "To hear [it], one would never guess that there was any involvement from Davies. The song [is] fit for Big Country, but would be out of place on a Davies' or Kinks' album."

== Track listing ==
CD single

1. "Somebody Else" – 4:04
2. "Sleep Until Dawn" – 4:35
3. "Another Misty Morning" – 4:55

== Personnel ==
Big Country

- Stuart Adamson – vocals, guitar
- Bruce Watson – guitar, backing vocals
- Tony Butler – bass, backing vocals
- Mark Brzezicki – drums, backing vocals

Production

- Rafe McKenna – production ("Somebody Else")
- Big Country – production (all tracks)

Other

- RA – artwork

== Charts ==
Chart (2000)	Peak position
UK Singles Chart	126
UK Independent Singles Chart (OCC)	27
