= People & Places (album) =

Studio album by Clive Gregson
- Released: 1995
- Genre: Folk rock
- Label: Compass; Demon
- Producer: Clive Gregson

Clive Gregson chronology
Carousel of Noise (1994)	People & Places (1995)	I Love This Town (1996)

People & Places is an album by the English musician Clive Gregson, released in 1995. It was Gregson's first solo studio album in 10 years.

== Production ==
The album was recorded in Nashville, where Gregson had moved; Gregson also produced People & Places. The songs were taken from a pool of around 70 that Gregson wrote in early 1994, in Minneapolis.

"Mary's Divorce" was inspired somewhat by the traditional folk song "Mairi's Wedding".

== Critical reception ==
Professional ratings
Review scores
Source	Rating
AllMusic	2.5/5 stars
The Encyclopedia of Popular Music	3/5 stars
MusicHound Folk: The Essential Album Guide	3.5/5 stars

Trouser Press thought that Gregson "folds the multiple folk and rock personalities of his past into an uncharacterizable blend, even steering clear of the adult alternative (AAA) drain." The Washington Post concluded that "the economical, sharply detailed lyrics are well matched to the poignant, moody melodies, but Gregson's opaque vocals and unimaginative arrangements prevent the songs from fulfilling their potential." The Denver Post opined that "Gregson has a knack for melodies that sound old-English traditional but accompany his own contemporary, sophisticated lyrics about love's sad ways."

The Chicago Reader called the album "a ruminative collection of bittersweet love songs marked by an unusual literateness." Stereo Review determined that "the overall impression left by People & Places is just a sort of generic wistful melancholy." The Los Angeles Daily News noted that "wry tales like 'Camden Town' and 'Feathers' draw from contemporary folk, British folk-rock and Celtic influences."

AllMusic wrote that Gregson's "literate lyrics are short domestic stories told in a generally straightforward way."

== Track listing ==
No.	Title	Length
1.	"Camden Town"
2.	"Feathers"
3.	"Mary's Divorce"
4.	"Gabriel"
5.	"My Eyes Gave the Game Away"
6.	"Medicine House"
7.	"Black Train Coming"
8.	"Bon Number"
9.	"Blue Rose"
10.	"My Favorite Lies"
11.	"Restless"
12.	"Lily of the Valley"
13.	"When This War Is Over"
