= No Stilettos =

- Starring: Eddi Reader
- Country of origin: United Kingdom
- No. of episodes: 6

Production
- Running time: approx. 1 hour per episode

Original release
- Network: BBC
- Release: 22 July – 26 August 1993

No Stilettos is a short-lived BBC music series made by BBC Scotland in Glasgow, and presented by Scottish pop and folk musician Eddi Reader. The programme was broadcast in 1993 on BBC Two in the UK and featured a mix of musical guests with an emphasis on the alternative/independent music scene of the time. The programme was recorded in the Cottier Theatre, a converted church in Glasgow's west-end, and artists who featured included 'local' Scottish bands such as Aztec Camera Teenage Fanclub and the BMX Bandits, to those from further afield such as Evan Dando of the Lemonheads, American Music Club and Pulp.
