= Love Is the Way =

Studio album by Eddi Reader
- Released: 13 April 2009
- Studio: 3kyoti Studio, Glasgow
- Genre: Pop, Folk
- Length: 56:00
- Label: Rough Trade
- Producer: Eddi Reader

Eddi Reader chronology
The Songs of Robert Burns Deluxe Edition (2009)	Love Is the Way (2009)	Vagabond (2014)

Professional ratings
Review scores
Source	Rating
The Times	link
The Skinny	4/5 stars
Music OMH	3.5/5 stars
Daily Express	3/5
Q	April 2009
Bournemouth Daily Echo	3/5 stars

Love Is the Way is the ninth studio album by Eddi Reader. It was released in the UK on 13 April 2009.

In a special arrangement with record label Rough Trade she sold an exclusive, pre-released and minimally packaged version of the disc on her autumn 2008 UK tour.

Produced by Reader herself and recorded in a matter of days with her band in Glasgow, the record includes songs written with her longtime writing partner Boo Hewerdine, her life partner John Douglas (of The Trashcan Sinatras), songs from Irish songwriters Declan O'Rourke and Jack Maher, Edinburgh-based Sandy Wright, an Eddi/Fleetwood Mac mashup and a rare Brian Wilson composition.

The album was promoted by a 25-date UK tour starting in April 2009.

== Track listing ==
#	Title	Composers	Time
1.	"Dragonflies"	Boo Hewerdine	5:16
2.	"Silent Bells"	Boo Hewerdine	3:32
3.	"New York City"	John Douglas	5:11
4.	"Dandelion"	Boo Hewerdine	3:02
5.	"Love Is the Way"	Declan O’Rourke	4:46
6.	"Sweet Mountain of Love"	Brian Wilson, Dave Sandler	4:55
7.	"Never Going Back Again (Queen of Scots)"	Lindsey Buckingham, Eddi Reader	3:14
8.	"Over it Now"	Boo Hewerdine, Eddi Reader	3:55
9.	"Fallen Twice"	Jack Maher	4:09
10.	"It's Magic"	Jule Styne, Sammy Cahn	3:37
11.	"Roses"	Eddi Reader, John Douglas	4:14
12.	"My Shining Star"	Sandy Wright	4:02
13.	"I Won't Stand in Your Way"	John Douglas	6:28

== Personnel ==
- Eddi Reader – vocals
- Boo Hewerdine – guitar, mellotron
- Alan Kelly – accordion
- Roy Dodds – drums
- John Douglas – ukulele, acoustic guitar
- Kevin McGuire – bass
- Jack Maher – guitar
- Teddy Borowiecki – piano, Moog, Hammond organ, bass accordion
- Stephen Douglas – drums, backing vocals
- Roddy Hart – piano
- John McCusker – cittern, whistles
- Heidi Talbot – harmony singing
- Sam Bessa Reader – guitar
- Charlie Bessa Reader – guitar
- Meg Reader-Thompson – chatter
