= Fragile Thing =

Single by Big Country featuring Eddi Reader

from the album Driving to Damascus
- B-side: "I Get Hurt; John Waynes Dream"
- Released: 9 August 1999
- Recorded: 1999
- Length: 3:43
- Label: Track Record
- Songwriters: Stuart Adamson; Bruce Watson
- Producers: Rafe McKenna; Big Country

Big Country singles chronology
"Non!" (1995)	"Fragile Thing" (1999)	"See You"/"Perfect World" (1999)

"Fragile Thing" is a song by Scottish rock band Big Country, released in August 1999 as the lead single from their eighth studio album Driving to Damascus. It was written by Stuart Adamson and Bruce Watson, and produced by Rafe McKenna and Big Country. "Fragile Thing" reached number 69 in the UK Singles Chart. A music video was filmed to promote the single.

== Background ==
Vocalist and guitarist Stuart Adamson has described "Fragile Thing" as being about "loss and redemption". Bassist Tony Butler told The Hounslow Chronicle in 1999 that the song is "slowish and ballady" and "tailored to Radio 2 listeners". He later recalled in 2006, "There's a haunting vibe to the sound (and chord structure) that I find very chilling yet infectious. It is a beautiful song embellished fantastically by Eddi Reader. It's about as country as I would go though."

The song features Adamson duetting with Eddi Reader. Reader recalled for Allan Glen's biography Stuart Adamson: In a Big Country, "I was living in London and got a call about working with the band and Stuart came round to my house for a chat. He explained that he would like to duet with me on this track, 'Fragile Thing', and when I heard it I thought it was wonderful."

== Release ==
"Fragile Thing" was released as the first single from Driving to Damascus. It gained airplay on local and national radio, and was added to BBC Radio 2's A and B playlists. Despite Track Record's belief that the song would break the UK Top 40, sales suffered after the limited edition CD release (housed in a box) had to be withdrawn by the label. The chart regulator, CIN, informed the label on the day of release that sales of the limited edition CD would not count towards the chart position due to packaging regulations (the single had "one cardboard fold too many"). When Track Record recalled the CD, some retailers, including HMV, withdrew all editions of the single in error. Adamson told Teletext in October 1999, "CIN have these rules and decided [the single] was illegal 'cause the packaging had more than four folds. It was upsetting 'cause it was selling well. Utter madness!"

Speaking of the single's limited commercial success, Butler told Louder Sound in 2018, "I know that really hurt Stuart a lot. It wasn't fair and the album died because of it. A lot of things went sour because of [the] scenario [with CIN]. It definitely hit Stuart bad. And it really did kill the commercial potential of the band."

== Critical reception ==
In a review of Driving to Damascus, Aaron Badgley of AllMusic commented, "Listening to the harmony vocals melt with the guitars in "Fragile Thing," it's difficult not to be moved." Ian Cranna of Q stated, "Overt country touches are few - "Fragile Thing" comes closest". Scott Rowley of Louder Sound considered the song "a well-crafted, country-tinged ballad, albeit one that had more in common with the Beautiful South than the Celtic rockers of old."

== Track listing ==
CD single (UK release)

1. "Fragile Thing" - 3:43
2. "I Get Hurt" - 4:30
3. "John Waynes Dream" - 4:59

CD single (UK limited edition)

1. "Fragile Thing" - 3:43
2. "Loserville" - 5:25
3. "Dust On the Road" - 3:28

CD single (European release)

1. "Fragile Thing" - 3:43
2. "Loserville" - 5:25
3. "Camp Smedley’s Theme " - 3:56

== Personnel ==
Big Country

- Stuart Adamson - vocals, guitar
- Bruce Watson - guitar
- Tony Butler - bass
- Mark Brzezicki - drums

Additional musicians

- Eddi Reader - backing vocals

Production

- Big Country - producers (all tracks)
- Rafe McKenna - producer (all tracks), mixing and recording on "Fragile Thing"
- Lee Butler - recording assistant on "Fragile Thing"
- Tim Young - mastering on "Fragile Thing"

Other

- Jim Herrington - photography
- JP3 for Playground Art - art direction, design

== Charts ==
Chart (1999)	Peak position
UK Singles Chart	69
UK Independent Singles Chart (OCC)	20
