= Annette Bjergfeldt =

Danish songwriter, singer and author

- Birth name: Annette Bjergfeldt
- Origin: Aarhus, Denmark
- Genres: Alternative, pop rock
- Instrument(s): Singing, song-writing
- Years active: 1995–present

Annette Bjergfeldt is a Danish songwriter, singer and author. She served on Statens Kunstfonds committee for scholarships during Musik 2014/15, appointed by the Danish Ministry of Culture. She has received the P4 Prisen and DJBFA's Hædersprisen awards from Danmarks Radio and has been nominated for 2 Grammys and 13 Danish Music Awards for her albums Red Letter Days (1995) with the band Harvest Moon, All That We Are (2001), Songs For Modern Mammals (2003), The Kissing Post, (2004), Man Må godt Ta´ To Gange, (2008) og Et Helt Nyt År, (2013). The album Songs For Modern Mammals was nominated for the award "Årets danske folk-album" (Danish folk-album of the year) at the Danish Music Awards in 2004. Bjergfeldt received four nomination at the same prize-show although she did not win any. She also co-wrote songs for international artists such as American guitar-icon Jerry Douglas (from Alison Krauss), Eddi Reader (from Fairground Attraction) and Teitur's classic "Josephine" along with the theme-music for Ordet Fanger.

Bjergfeldt has toured for four years across the United States visiting festivals, clubs and radio stations. She was one of the first Danish songwriters who decided publish on her own record label. In the 2010s Bjergfeldt worked as a musical theme writer for movies such as Bagland and the Internationale Choir Vocalline. Since 2000 Bjergfeldt has also trained other songwriters across the country, among them students from the Rhythmic Music Conservatory and Danmarks Radio's KarriereKanonen. She has trained songwriters in Greenland and Sweden and trained singing for prisoners of Vridsløselille Statsfængsel.

== Author ==
Annette Bjergfeldt has written the cook book Kogebog For Sangskrivere – Grovhakket Inspiration (Wilhelm Hansen 2005) and 3 children's books about the optimistic girl "Børste" (Alvilda 2010, 2011 & 2013).
