= See You (Big Country song) =

Single by Big Country

from the album Driving to Damascus
- A-side: "Perfect World" (double A-side)
- Released: 25 October 1999
- Recorded: 1999
- Length: 3:50
- Label: Track Record
- Songwriter(s): Stuart Adamson
- Producer(s): Rafe McKenna; Big Country

Big Country singles chronology
"Fragile Thing" (1999)	"See You" (1999)	"Somebody Else" (2000)

"See You" is a song by Scottish rock band Big Country, released in October 1999 as a double A-side single with "Perfect World". It was the second single to be released from their eighth studio album Driving to Damascus and reached number 77 in the UK Singles Chart. "See You" was written by Stuart Adamson and "Perfect World" was written by Adamson, Mark Brzezicki, Tony Butler and Bruce Watson. Both tracks were produced by Rafe McKenna and Big Country.

== Background ==
In 2006, bassist Tony Butler described "See You" as a "beautiful track" and added, "I thought Stuart's vocal on this song was so in tune with the sentiment, it totally works for me." Speaking of "Perfect World", the song which "See You" was paired with as a double A-side single, Butler recalled how the band had tried to adopt a contemporary edge to their sound: "[It] was a quest to add something different to the Big Country sound. We had by this time, a very strong musical identity, but there was always an ambition to move forward, but not lose the essence of what we were about. I think this was Rafe McKenna's finest moment; introducing the loops and other noises. It added a contemporary drive to the track that made it very cool."

== Release ==
"See You" was issued with "Perfect World" as a double A-side single in the UK on 25 October 1999. Two editions of the single were issued on CD. CD1 contained the additional, exclusive track "This Blood's for You" and a pair of postcards of the band photographed in Nashville. CD2 contained an additional track, "Camp Smedley's Theme", which was also exclusive to the release, and two postcards of the band photographed in Kosovo. The single was also issued on 7-inch vinyl in a generic white sleeve. CD2's front cover is a photograph taken during the band's visit to Kosovo. It shows a Kosovan orphan playing guitarist Bruce Watson's mandolin, with a ruined building, a result of the Kosovo War, in the background.

"See You" received airplay on BBC Radio 2. It was on the station's 'C-List' for the week commencing 18 October.

== Music videos ==
No music video was made for "See You", but two music videos were shot for "Perfect World" to promote the double A-side single. The first video was shot at Stockley Park and is interspersed with footage of the band performing at their 1999 fan club convention in Egham. The second video features footage filmed during the band's time in Kosovo, as well as clips from the fan club convention shoot.

== Critical reception ==
In a 2011 review of Driving to Damascus, Tim Jones of Record Collector called "See You" "amiable US rock radio fodder". Nick James of God Is in the TV, in a review of the album's 2023 deluxe edition release, described "Perfect World" as being a "track of particular note" and commented that it features the "prowess of Brzezicki's sticks, just over four minutes of pure magic, played at a frantic pace".

== Track listing ==
7-inch single

1. "See You" – 3:50
2. "Perfect World" – 4:02

CD single (#1)

1. "See You" – 3:50
2. "Perfect World" – 4:02
3. "This Blood's for You" – 3:43

CD single (#2)

1. "See You" – 3:50
2. "Perfect World" – 4:02
3. "Camp Smedley's Theme" – 3:56

== Personnel ==
Big Country

- Stuart Adamson – vocals, guitar
- Bruce Watson – guitar, backing vocals
- Tony Butler – bass, backing vocals
- Mark Brzezicki – drums, backing vocals

Additional musicians

- Sally Herbert – string arrangement ("See You")
- Electrastrings (Sally Herbert, Jules Singleton, Anne Stephenson, Ginni Ball, Claire Orsler, Dinah Beamish) – string section ("See You")

Production

- Rafe McKenna – production ("See You", "Perfect World" and "This Blood's for You"), recording and mixing ("See You" and "Perfect World")
- Big Country – production (all tracks)
- Tim Young – mastering ("See You", "Perfect World")

Other

- Jim Herrington – photography
- Jp3 for Playground Art – design and art direction

== Charts ==
Chart (1999)	Peak position
UK Singles (OCC)	77
UK Independent Singles Chart (OCC)	16
