= Trouble No More (Darden Smith album) =

Studio album by Darden Smith
- Released: 1990
- Studios: Mad Dog, Burbank, California; Arlyn, Austin, Texas; De-Mix, London
- Label: Columbia
- Producers: Pete Anderson, Martin Lascelles, Darden Smith

Darden Smith chronology
| Darden Smith (1988) | Trouble No More (1990) | Little Victories (1993) |

Trouble No More is an album by the American musician Darden Smith, released in 1990. It was a commercial disappointment. Smith promoted the album by touring with Marshall Crenshaw.

== Production ==
The album was produced by Pete Anderson, Martin Lascelles, and Smith. The sessions began in Los Angeles, with Anderson; Columbia Records and Smith decided to do more recording in Austin, with Lascelles. Two of the album's songs were cowritten with Boo Hewerdine, with whom Smith had recorded an album that was released one year prior to Trouble No More. "Johnny Was a Lucky One" is about a Vietnam veteran. Preston Hubbard, of the Fabulous Thunderbirds, played bass on "Fall Apart at the Seams" and "Frankie & Sue".

== Critical reception ==
Professional ratings
Review scores
| Source | Rating |
|---|---|
| AllMusic | 3/5 stars |
| The Encyclopedia of Popular Music | 4/5 stars |
| Houston Chronicle | 3.5/4 stars |
| Los Angeles Daily News | 4/4 stars |
| MusicHound Rock: The Essential Album Guide | 4/5 stars |
| The Rolling Stone Album Guide | 3.5/5 stars |
| Windsor Star | B+ |

Spin noted that "Smith's melodies ride a fine line between divinely catchy and John Mellencamp rejects." The Chicago Reader called the album "questioning, calm, and likeable," writing that "he has an intimate, cozy way with a melody–the one on the shimmering '2,000 Years', for example, efficiently overwhelms the song's kinda dumb apocalyptic visions." The Vancouver Sun praised the "lush melodies, sweeping acoustic guitar rhythms and richly topical lyrics."

The Windsor Star thought that "this mainly acoustic set features good melodies, Smith's emotional vocals, and some great arrangements." The Edmonton Journal determined that Trouble No More "goes to waste in a flurry of plagiarism... His 'Ashes to Ashes' sounds so like Mellencamp's 'Jack And Diane' it warrants a court order." The Philadelphia Inquirer deemed "Fall Apart at the Seams" the album's best song, writing that Smith has "from his country roots toward a lean pop sound."

The Encyclopedia of Popular Music stated that Trouble No More was "possibly" Smith's best album.

== Track listing ==
All tracks are written by Darden Smith, except where noted.

| No. | Title | Writer(s) | Length |
|---|---|---|---|
| 1. | "Midnight Train" | | 3:47 |
| 2. | "Frankie & Sue" | | 3:01 |
| 3. | "All the King's Horses" | | 3:00 |
| 4. | "2000 Years" | | 3:30 |
| 5. | "Ashes to Ashes" | | 3:33 |
| 6. | "Fall Apart at the Seams" | | 3:32 |
| 7. | "Trouble No More" | | 2:54 |
| 8. | "Long Way Home" | Smith, Boo Hewerdine | 3:32 |
| 9. | "Listen to My Own Voice" | | 3:47 |
| 10. | "Johnny Was a Lucky One" | | 2:54 |
| 11. | "Bottom of a Deep Well" | Smith, Hewerdine | 3:21 |
