= Darden Smith =

American singer-songwriter

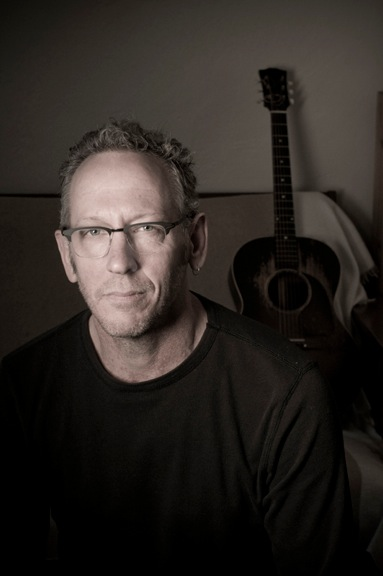
- Smith in 2013

Background information
- Born: Darden Craig Smith; March 11, 1962 (age 64)
- Origin: Austin, Texas US
- Genres: Folk, Americana, Rock, Country
- Occupations: Singer-songwriter, educator
- Instrument: Guitar
- Years active: 1986–present
- Labels: Compass Records, Dualtone Music Group, DardenMusic, Columbia Music, Ensign Records
- Website: www.dardensmith.com

Darden Smith (born March 11, 1962, in Brenham, Texas) is an Austin-based singer-songwriter known for his lyrics and for weaving folk and Americana influences with rock, pop, and the musical roots of his home state. His debut album, "Native Soil," was released in 1986. His sixteenth album, Western Skies, was released March 25, 2022. Smith has published two books, The Habit of Noticing: Using Creativity to Make a Life (and a Living) (2018) and Western Skies (2022), a companion book for the album of the same name. Over the past two decades, Smith has developed two non-profit programs, The Be An Artist Program (2003) and SongwritingWith: Soldiers (2011). Both use collaborative songwriting to work with groups ranging from children in the classroom to military members returning home from combat. Smith established SongwritingWith:Soldiers as a separate non-profit organization in 2012.

== Biography ==
Smith's early interest in music was sparked by singing in the local church choir, the "seat-rattling sound" of the church's pipe organ, and accompanying his parents to country-western dances. By the third grade, he had a guitar and a teacher who taught him how to play every song on Neil Young's Harvest and After the Gold Rush. Smith began writing his own songs at age ten. In 1976, after his family moved to Humble, Texas, in the Houston suburbs, Smith spent his teen years listening to Guy Clark, Townes Van Zandt, John Prine, and Bob Dylan. His musical influences expanded when he moved to Austin to attend The University of Texas and was exposed to blues and reggae, as well as musicians coming out of the United Kingdom such as Nick Lowe, Elvis Costello, and The Pretenders. Smith quickly got involved with Austin's burgeoning music scene, playing in small Austin venues like the Alamo Lounge, Taco Flats, and Waterloo Ice House. By the time Smith graduated with a Bachelor of Arts in American Studies (1985), he was a regular on the local and Texas music scenes. He has one son and one daughter.

== Career ==
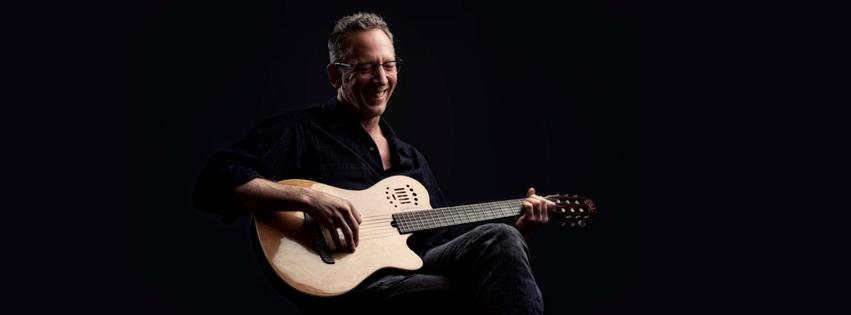
Photograph by Stacy L. Pearsall

After releasing Native Soil in 1986, Darden Smith was signed by Dick James Music to a publishing deal. In 1987, Epic Records signed Smith at the inaugural South by Southwest Festival and released Darden Smith (1988), which produced two country chart hit singles, “Little Maggie” and “Day After Tomorrow.” Later that year, Nigel Grainge, the head of Ensign Records, introduced Smith to the British songwriter Boo Hewerdine. Four days later, they had eight songs and a record deal with Ensign/Chrysalis that resulted in Evidence (1989). After Smith's label deal with Epic was transferred to the pop division of Columbia Records, he released Trouble No More (1990), best known for “Midnight Train” and “Frankie & Sue," and Little Victories (1993) which included the Top 10 pop hit single, "Loving Arms".

Smith left Columbia in 1995 and spent several years without an agent or label. He returned to recording through independent labels, which led to Deep Fantastic Blue, on Plump Records, and a trio of albums for Dualtone Records (Sunflower, 2002; Circo, 2004; Field of Crows, 2005). He self- released a collection of his favorites from his previous albums, After All This Time, in 2007, to Marathon (2010), a 15-track cycle of songs named for a remote town in West Texas, described by one reviewer as "a peak in [Smith's] 25-year songwriting career. His 2017 album Everything was co-produced by Smith and Stewart Lerman and released on Compass Records. The Habit of Noticing:Using Creativity to Make a Life (and a Living) (2018) was published by Irie Books. Western Skies (2022) is multi-media work comprising a new studio record, a book of photography, lyrics, and essays. A spoken word album, Western Skies - The Essays (2022) was released in 2022. Smith continues to write songs for his own albums as well as collaborating with other writers on outside projects. He tours regularly, performing at venues across America and the UK.

== Visual Art ==
Smith began drawing in his late twenties as a way to remain creative while traveling for music. What began a private exercise now makes up a major part of his work. His first gallery show was at Austin’s Bale Creek Allen Gallery (2018). His work is in corporate and private collections in the US, UK and Europe. The Western Skies – Lithographs series premiered at Houston’s Redbud Gallery in March 2022. Lucky Strikes, an etching from 2018, was purchased by the Library of Congress for the Prints and Photography Collection.

== Collaborative Songwriting ==
Smith began writing songs with non-songwriters in 2003 with Smith founded The Be An Artist Program in 2003. The program bringing arts and creativity into educational settings, including songwriting with students. Smith has brought this work to such diverse groups as homeless young adults at Covenant House in New Jersey; residents of South Africa and Sefhare, Botswana suffering from HIV/AIDS, and Israeli and Palestinian groups. He co-founded SongwritingWith:Soldiers in 2012 with Mary Judd to bring professional songwriters together with military members and their families to process the effects of combat and the return home. In 2021 he co-founded Frontline Songs to bring this therapeutic process to frontline healthcare workers during the pandemic. Through his Collaborative Songwriting, he works with corporate clients and individuals to use songwriting in corporate settings to help tell stories through song, and to foster greater understanding.

== Other contributions ==
- Songwriter-in-Residence at University of Texas at Austin's College of Fine Arts
- Artist-in-Residence at Oklahoma State University’s Institute for Creativity and Innovation
- Arts Entrepreneur-in-Residence at Oklahoma's School of Entrepreneurship.
- Published "Using Your Gift: Creativity in the Classroom" with The Huffington Post.
- Developed scripts and workshop performances of “Marathon” (2009–10).
- Researched and produced “Songs From the Big Sky,” a radio documentary on Texas songwriters for BBC Radio 2 (2006).
- Composed “Grand Motion,” a symphony commissioned by Peter Bay for the Austin Symphony Orchestra, accompanied by dance performance inspired by composition (1999).
- Composed music for dance/theatre productions, including “9 Chains to the Moon” and “Walking on Water” for the Johnson/Long Dance Company in Austin, TX (1988–94).

== Discography ==
| Title | Album details |
|---|---|
| Western Skies | Release date: March 25, 2022; Label: Bull By The Horns |
| Everything | Release date: April 7, 2017; Label: Compass Records |
| Love Calling | Release date: August 27, 2013; Label: Compass Records |
| Marathon | Released: 2010; Label: Darden Music |
| After All This Time | Released: 2009; Label: Darden Music |
| Ojo | Released: 2007; Label: Darden Music |
| Field of Crows | Released: 2005; Label: Dualtone Music Group |
| Circo | Released: 2004; Label: Dualtone Music Group |
| Sunflower | Released: 2002; Label: Dualtone Music Group |
| Extra Extra | Released: 2000; Label: Valley Entertainment |
| Deep Fantastic Blue | Released: 1996; Label: Plump Records |
| Little Victories | Released: 1993; Label: Columbia |
| Trouble No More | Released: 1990; Label: Columbia |
| Boo Hewerdine and Darden Smith—Evidence | Released: 1989; Ensign/Chrysalis; re-released Compass Records, 1996 |
| Darden Smith | Released: 1988; Label: CBS/Epic Records |
| Native Soil | Released: 1986; Label: Redi-Mix Records; re-released on Watermelon Records, 1992 |
