= Driving to Damascus =

Studio album by Big Country
- Released: 23 August 1999
- Recorded: Rockfield Studios, Monmouth, Wales, January–May 1999
- Genre: Heartland rock
- Length: 56:49
- Label: Track
- Producers: Big Country, Rafe McKenna

Big Country chronology
Eclectic (1996)	Driving to Damascus (1999)	The Journey (2013)

Alternative cover
- Cover of the 2002 U.S. remaster of the album, renamed John Wayne's Dream.

Singles from Driving to Damascus
- 1. "Fragile Thing" Released: 3 August 1999; 2. "See You" / "Perfect World" Released: 25 October 1999; 3. "Somebody Else" Released: 30 May 2000

Professional ratings
Review scores
Source	Rating
AllMusic (Driving to Damascus)	4.5/5 stars
AllMusic (John Wayne's Dream)	4/5 stars
Record Collector (Driving to Damascus)	3/5 stars

Driving to Damascus is the eighth studio album by Scottish rock band Big Country. It was released in August 1999 as both a standard edition and a limited edition digipack, and with bonus tracks in 2002. In the U.S., it was released under a different name, John Wayne's Dream. The limited-edition version featured different cover artwork, and included two tracks by Stuart Adamson's alt-country side project, The Raphaels ("Shattered Cross" and "Too Many Ghosts", subsequently released on the 2001 album Supernatural), although there was no indication in the credits that these were not by Big Country.

Driving to Damascus marks the band's last studio album to feature vocalist Stuart Adamson (who would die in 2001) and bassist Tony Butler (who retired from the band in 2012), and the last studio album until The Journey was released in 2013 with the Alarm vocalist Mike Peters taking over for Adamson and Simple Minds bassist Derek Forbes replacing Butler.

The album was re-released on both CD and vinyl format to celebrate the band's 30th anniversary in 2012.

== Track listing ==
No.	Title	Writer(s)	Length
1.	"Driving to Damascus"	Stuart Adamson, Mark Brzezicki, Bruce Watson	3:58
2.	"Dive in to Me"	Adamson, Brzezicki, Tony Butler, Watson	5:02
3.	"See You"	Adamson	3:50
4.	"Perfect World"	Adamson, Brzezicki, Butler, Watson	4:02
5.	"Somebody Else"	Adamson, Ray Davies	4:04
6.	"Fragile Thing"	Adamson, Watson	4:33
7.	"The President Slipped and Fell"	Adamson, Brzezicki, Butler, Watson	2:57
8.	"Devil in the Eye"	Adamson, Davies	4:15
9.	"Trouble the Waters"	Adamson, Brzezicki, Watson	4:10
10.	"Bella"	Adamson	3:34
11.	"Your Spirit to Me"	Adamson	5:13
12.	"Grace"	Adamson, Brzezicki, Butler, Watson	5:10

John Wayne's Dream extra tracks
No.	Title	Writer(s)	Length
13.	"I Get Hurt"	Adamson	4:28
14.	"This Blood's for You"	Adamson	3:43
15.	"Loserville"	Adamson, Brzezicki, Butler, Watson	5:18
16.	"John Wayne's Dream"	Adamson	8:44

Limited edition digipack extra tracks
No.	Title	Writer(s)	Length
13.	"Shattered Cross"	Adamson, Boonstra	4:02
14.	"Too Many Ghosts"	Hummon, Adamson	4:12

== Personnel ==
- Stuart Adamson – vocals, guitar, mandolin, slide guitar, Moog synthesizer
- Bruce Watson – guitar, mandolin, sitar, slide guitar
- Tony Butler – bass, vocals, vibraphone
- Mark Brzezicki – drums, vocals, programming

Additional personnel

- Eddi Reader – backing vocals
- Kirsten Adamson – backing vocals
- Rafe McKenna – backing vocals
- Sally Herbert – string arrangements
- Anne Stephenson – strings
- Claire Orsler – strings
- Dinah Beamish – strings
- Ginni Ball – strings
- Jules Singleton – strings
- Sally Herbert – strings
- Josh Phillips – keyboards
- Rowan Stigner – loops

== Charts ==
Chart (1999–2000)	Peak position
German Albums (Offizielle Top 100)	96
Scottish Albums (Official Charts)	60
UK Albums (Official Charts)	82

Chart (2023)	Peak position
Scottish Albums (Official Charts)	17
