= Eddi Reader =

Scottish singer-songwriter (born 1959)

Eddi Reader MBE
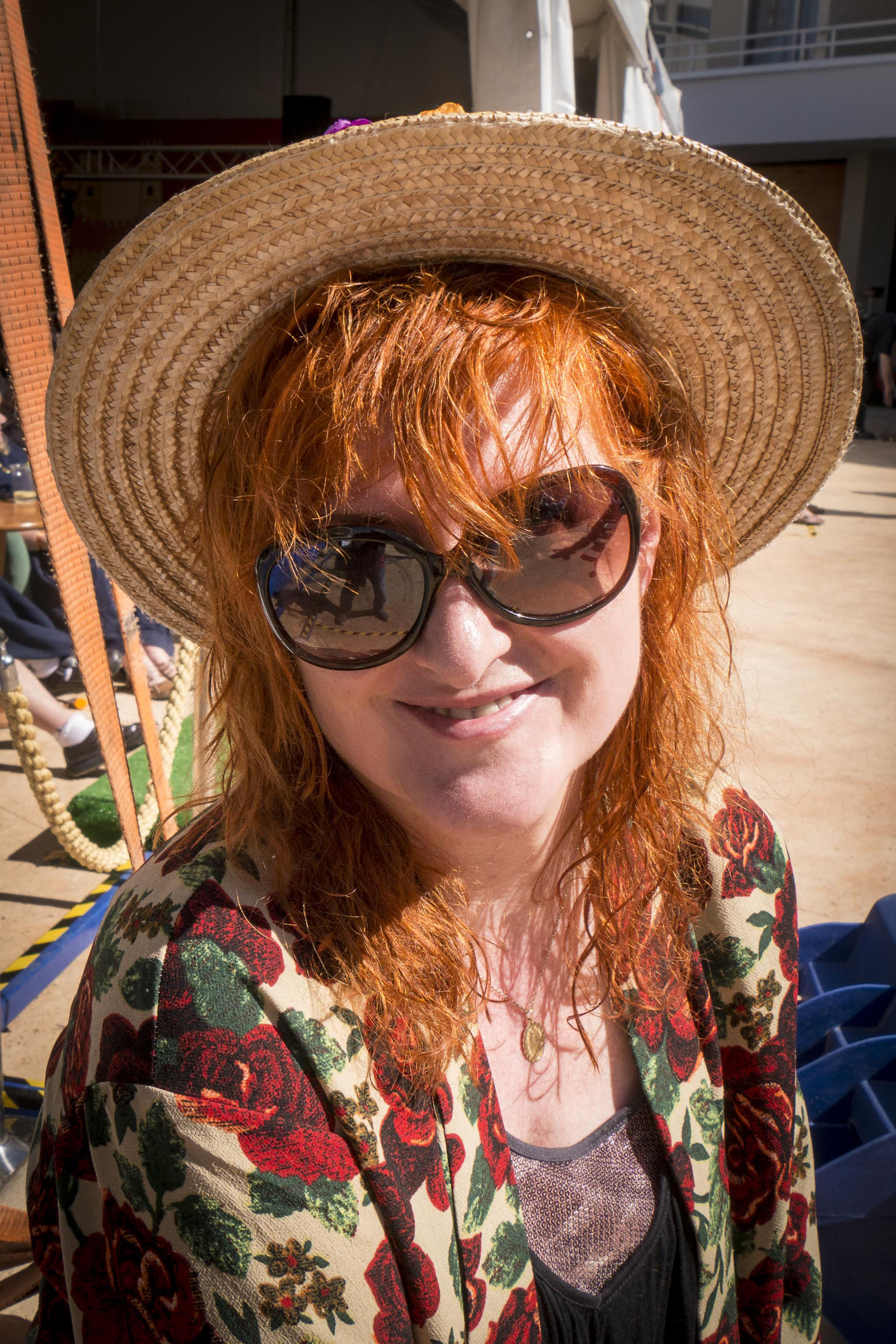
- Reader at the Costa del Folk festival in Mallorca, 2016

Background information
- Born: Sadenia Reader; 29 August 1959 (age 67)
- Origin: Glasgow, Scotland
- Genres: Pop; folk; jazz
- Occupations: Singer; songwriter; musician; record producer
- Instruments: Vocals; acoustic guitar; concertina; harmonica; piano; ukulele
- Years active: 1984–present
- Labels: RCA; Blanco y Negro; Rough Trade; Compass
- Website: eddireader.co.uk

Sadenia "Eddi" Reader MBE (born 29 August 1959) is a Scottish singer-songwriter, known for her work as the lead vocalist of the folk and soft rock band Fairground Attraction and for an enduring solo career. She is the recipient of three Brit Awards. In 2003, she showcased the works of Scotland's national poet, Robert Burns.

== Early career ==
Reader was born in Glasgow, Scotland, the daughter of a welder and the eldest of seven children; her brother Francis is vocalist with the band Trashcan Sinatras, and her grandmother Sadie Smith was a leading Scottish footballer. She was nicknamed Edna by her parents. Living at first in the district of Anderston, in a tenement slum demolished in 1965, the young Reader family moved to a two-bedroomed flat in the estate of Arden.

In 1976, due to overcrowding, the family was rehoused 25 miles from Glasgow, in a council development in Irvine, North Ayrshire. However, Reader returned to Glasgow (where she lived with her grandmother in Pollok) to finish her compulsory schooling. She began playing the guitar at the age of ten, and started her musical career busking, first in Glasgow's Sauchiehall Street, then in the early 1980s in London and around Europe (where she also worked with circus and performance artists).

Back in Scotland, while finding factory work in Irvine and working part-time in Sirocco Recording Studio in Kilmarnock, she answered an advert in the music press and travelled to London to audition and join the post-punk band Gang of Four, who needed a backing vocalist for their appearance on British television music show The Old Grey Whistle Test and for their UK tour. This led to her first US tour with the band. After returning to the UK and leaving the band, she started working as a session vocalist in London, picking up work singing jingles for radio advertisements and singing with such acts as Eurythmics, The Waterboys, Billy Mackenzie of the Associates, John Foxx of Ultravox and Alison Moyet.

== Fairground Attraction ==
In 1984, Reader returned to the UK from Paris, where she had been working as a singer for the Romanian composer Vladimir Cosma. Through her contact with the brass section session musicians Kick Horns in London, she signed a recording contract with EMI, and recorded two singles with the disco group Outbar Squeek. Around the same time, she met and asked Mark E. Nevin, a guitarist and songwriter from the band Jane Aire and the Belvederes to write for her and they recorded two songs as 'The Academy of Fine Popular Music'. They subsequently formed Fairground Attraction, together with Simon Edwards (guitarrón – a Mexican acoustic bass guitar) and Roy Dodds (drums and percussion). In 1988, the band signed to the RCA and BMG labels and, in March 1988, released their first single, "Perfect", which became a UK number one, winning best single at the 1989 Brit Awards. Their debut studio album, The First of a Million Kisses, was also a success, reaching number two in the UK Albums Chart, and winning best album at the 1989 Brits.

This success was short-lived, however. In November 1989, after a break, during which Reader had her first child, Charlie, with her French-Algerian partner Milou, arguments arose within the group, and Nevin abandoned a recording session for their second studio album, which eventually led to the break-up of the band. A makeshift second album, a collection of B-sides and live tracks, Ay Fond Kiss, was rushed out the following year.

In 2024, the band's original line-up announced a Japan and UK tour, and reunited for an album titled "Beautiful Happening", released on September 20th 2024. A first single, "What's Wrong With The World?", was released in February 2025, followed by the album's title track in June 2025.

== Solo career ==
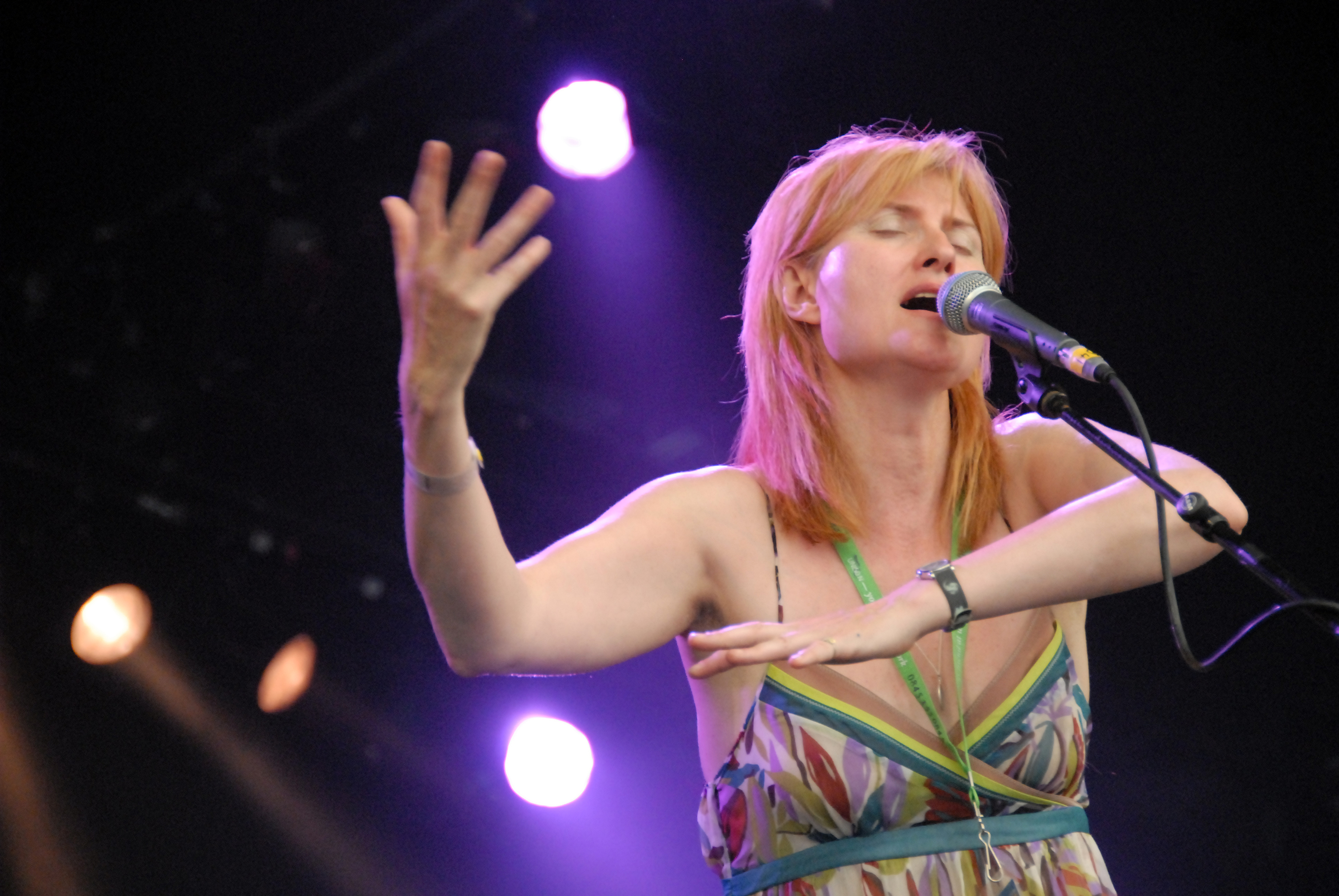
Reader performing live in 2006

=== Mirmama and Eddi Reader (1992–1994) ===
Reader returned to Scotland, but before she embarked on her solo career she took a temporary detour into acting. She played Jolene Jowett, a singer and accordionist, in John Byrne's Your Cheatin' Heart, a comedy-drama series for BBC Television, set in the country music scene in Scotland. In 1993, Reader was the presenter of BBC Scotland's No Stilettos, a music performance programme recorded in Glasgow. Her other acting credits include playing the part of Joy 3 from the Michael Boyd (artistic director of the Royal Shakespeare Company) production of Janice Galloway's The Trick Is to Keep Breathing. This was a BBC Radio 4 production in 1996 and also a Tron Theatre production the same year.

Returning to London, Reader worked on new material with a backing band calling itself the Patron Saints of Imperfection (made up of Roy Dodds, Neill and Calum MacColl, and Phil Steriopoulos). This became her debut solo studio album, recorded for RCA Records: 1992's Mirmama. She met Geoff Travis who signed her to Warner Bros. subsidiary label, Blanco y Negro. The managing director Rob Dickens executively produced her second solo studio album Eddi Reader (1994), which won her the "Best Female Singer" Brit Award that year, followed by Candyfloss and Medicine (1996), and Angels & Electricity (1998). She parted ways with Warner Bros. and continued her work on Geoff Travis' Rough Trade label when she recorded Simple Soul (2001) and Driftwood (2002) – a "homegrown" release of songs recorded during the Simple Soul sessions. During this time, Reader also recorded the song "Ocean Love" for the soundtrack of the animated Danish film Help! I'm a Fish (2001). Reader also contributed backing vocals to one of Big Country's final singles before Stuart Adamson's death, "Fragile Thing".

=== Sings the Songs of Robert Burns (1994–2007) ===
Reader continued to tour (England, Scotland, Japan, Australia, Spain, the United States, and Ireland). In 2003, she recorded her album of material by Robert Burns, with the Royal Scottish National Orchestra, leading to good reviews and an international resurgence in interest in Scotland's "bard".

In 2004, Reader sang at the re-opening of the new Scottish Parliament building, where she was presented to Queen Elizabeth II. She has described the experience: "I was honoured to sing at the opening of the parliament although I almost didn’t get to. I wanted to sing ‘Auld Lang Syne' as I thought that would have been perfect for the politicians with everyone shaking hands but they wanted me to sing it in 'F’ key and that wasn't the key for me so I told them I wasn't doing it. It was only at the last minute that I eventually agreed."

Reader spent April 2006 touring Australia with Boo Hewerdine and Alan Kelly, following the release of St Clare's Night Out: Live at The Basement, with Australian acts such as David Hosking invited to open the concerts.

Reader's eighth studio album, Peacetime, was released in 2007 on the Rough Trade record label. Produced by fellow Scottish folk musician, John McCusker, the album features a few Burns composed songs, alongside original material with long-time collaborator Boo Hewerdine and the Trash Can Sinatras' John Douglas.

=== Love Is the Way (2008–2010) ===
In spring 2008, Reader was a special guest at the Hotel Cafe Tour hosted by Tom McRae. In 2009, she performed in period drama film Me and Orson Welles, directed by Richard Linklater and starring Zac Efron, Christian McKay and Claire Danes. Reader performed re-arranged 1930s standards, with Jools Holland, with whom she had previously collaborated on the single "Waiting Game".

To commemorate the 250th anniversary of Robert Burns' birth, Reader released The Songs of Robert Burns Deluxe Edition in January 2009. The new release brought together the original Burns album with seven additional songs, two from the original 2003 sessions ("Green Grow the Rashes O", "Of A' the Airts"), three from 2007's Peacetime ("Ye banks and Braes", "Aye Waukin O" and "Leezie Lindsay") the unreleased "Dainty Davie", also from that session, and a brand new recording, "Comin' Thro the Rye/Dram Behind the Curtain". The new album was promoted, like the original release, with two sold-out shows at the annual Celtic Connections festival in Glasgow.

In 2009, Reader released her ninth studio album, Love Is the Way, which was self-produced. In a special arrangement with record label Rough Trade she sold an exclusive, pre-released and minimally-packaged version of the disc on her 19-date autumn 2008 UK tour.

=== Vagabond and recent work (2010–present) ===
In april 2009 Reader released the album Vagabond and in early 2010, she appeared on the Irish language album Ceol '10 Súil Siar, singing an Irish language version of the Fairground Attraction song "Perfect" called "Foirfe". In December she released a live album on her own label and sold exclusively via her online store, Live in Japan. Recorded from the sound desk at her Japan shows in September 2009, it was mastered and mixed by Mark Freegard who had worked on the Reader's ninth solo studio album Love Is the Way.

== Personal life ==
In 2013, Reader married John Douglas, a songwriter and member of Trashcan Sinatras alongside her brother Frank.

=== Political views ===
No decent English human being can fail to see how this 'union' is flawed from the English side. There is a distinct difference between walking... side by side... arm in arm. Or being as ignored as the lint in the back pocket of English psyche. I saw it, heard it, watched it... experienced it.

— Eddi Reader, 25 February 2013

Reader has been an advocate for the Yes Scotland movement, campaigning for a Yes vote in the referendum for Scottish independence from the United Kingdom. Her 2013 appearance on the British TV programme Question Time was publicly criticised, with one viewer threatening on Twitter to cut her tongue out. Reader has said she is "an egalitarian who believes in the autonomy of small nations, it's unconscionable that those who call people 'nationalists' for wanting their country to manage its own wealth, do not recognise the 'nationalistic' choice of supporting a 'BRITISH nation'". Reader said that, in reprisal for her advocacy for Scottish independence, Lord Steel of Aikwood said in a debate on Scottish independence in the House of Lords that Reader's work on Robert Burns was "murdering Burns' simple melodies". Reader also said that the newspaper The Scotsman, in reprisal for Reader choosing to advocate a Yes vote, had published a story mischaracterising her political views and misrepresenting her great-uncle as a Nazi and leader in the Irish Republican Army (IRA), stating: "there’s people out there in Scotland, especially in the Press, and especially at The Scotsman — which is a very wrong name for that paper, because they don’t believe in Scotland at all; they believe in London management — who believe that Scots do not deserve the vote. I don’t want to be in that team." She issued a formal appeal to the Press Complaints Commission (PCC), saying that: "The article was trying to portray ALL people wanting to have Scots running Scotland and independence voters as having links with the early Fascists. The journalist scrapped around and tried to attach my great-uncle, who supported independence, to a 'Nazi' group and a terrorist organisation, creating hateful responses and threats to my family." The PCC ruled in May 2013 that the image in the story, accompanied by the headline ‘Klan Alba’, did not breach the Editor’s Code of Practice.

Reader is writing a book for publication about her great-uncle Seamus (or James) Reader, based on his extensive diaries. He was head of the Scottish Brigade of the Irish Republican Brotherhood (IRB), when the Irish War of Independence broke out in 1919, later becoming a founder of the abortive Scottish Republican Army, which attempted to replicate the Irish struggle in Scotland between the wars. On Facebook, she posted that he: "was in command of 4,000 Scots involved in the Irish Rising build-up and the Irish war against The British state. In telling the story I felt my ancestor was passing the baton to me to tell the truthful story of this time".

== Awards ==
The Robert Burns project saw Reader awarded an MBE for outstanding contributions to the arts in the New Year's honours list of 2006.

In May 2007, she was awarded an honorary doctorate from the University of Strathclyde. Later that year she was recognised for her contributions to music and to the education and encouragement of young musicians with an honorary doctorate and a Doctor of Letters from Glasgow Caledonian University. In June 2008, she received another doctorate for her musical work, this time from the University of Stirling, and in 2013 she received an honorary doctor of music award from the University of Edinburgh.

Year	Awards	Work	Category	Result
1989	Brit Awards	"Perfect"	Best British Single	Won
1989	Brit Awards	The First of a Million Kisses	Best British Album	Won
1995	Ivor Novello Awards	"Patience of Angels"	Best Song Musically & Lyrically	Nominated
1995	Ivor Novello Awards	"Dear John"	Best Song Musically & Lyrically	Nominated
1995	Brit Awards	Herself	Best British Female	Won
1997	Brit Awards	Herself	Best British Female	Nominated
2016	Boisdale Music Awards	Herself	Great Scot Music Award	Won

== Discography ==
=== Albums ===
List of albums, with selected chart positions and certifications
Title	Details	Peak chart positions	Certifications
Title	Details	UK	Certifications
Mirmama	Released: 12 October 1992; Label: RCA	34	
Eddi Reader	Released: 20 June 1994; Label: Blanco y Negro	4	BPI: Gold
Candyfloss and Medicine	Released: 8 July 1996; Label: Blanco y Negro	24	
Angels & Electricity	Released: 11 May 1998; Label: Blanco y Negro	49	
Simple Soul	Released: 9 January 2001; Label: Rough Trade	92	
Driftwood	Released: 8 October 2001; Label: Rough Trade	—	
Sings the Songs of Robert Burns	Released: 12 May 2003; Label: Rough Trade	86	BPI: Silver
Peacetime	Released: 29 January 2007; Label: Rough Trade	93	
Love Is the Way	Released: 13 April 2009; Label: Rough Trade	109	
Vagabond	Released: 13 April 2009; Label: Reveal	93	
Cavalier	Released: 28 September 2018; Label: Reveal	—	
Light Is in the Horizon	Released: 1 April 2022; Label: Vertical	—	

=== Singles ===
Title	Year	Peak chart positions	Album
Title	Year	UK	Album
"All or Nothing"	1991	—	Mirmama
"What You Do with What You've Got"	1992	100	Mirmama
"Patience of Angels"	1994	33	Eddi Reader
"Joke (I'm Laughing)"	1994	42	Eddi Reader
"Dear John"	1994	48	Eddi Reader
"Nobody Lives Without Love"	1995	84	Batman Forever
"Town Without Pity"	1996	26	Candyfloss and Medicine
"Medicine"	1996	100	Candyfloss and Medicine
"Waiting Game" (with Jools Holland)	1996	—	Sex & Jazz & Rock & Roll
"Prayer Wheel"	1998	—	Angels & Electricity
"Fragile Thing" (with Big Country)	1999	69	Driving to Damascus
"Usual Things" (with Little Tempo & Linton Kwesi Johnson)	1999	—	Non-album single
"The Girl Who Fell in Love with the Moon"	2001	—	Simple Soul
"Prodigal Daughter"/"Simple Soul"	2001	—	Simple Soul
"Holiday"	2002	—	Driftwood
"May You Never" (with David Knopfler)	2002	—	Wishbones
"Auld Lang Syne"/"Wild Mountainside"	2003	—	Sings the Songs of Robert Burns
"My Love Is Like a Red, Red Rose"/"Jamie Come Try Me"	2003	—	Sings the Songs of Robert Burns
"Muddy Water"	2007	—	Peacetime
"Roses"	2009	—	Love Is the Way
"Dragonflies"	2009	—	Love Is the Way
"Baby's Boat"	2013	—	Vagabond
"Back the Dogs (Dancing Down Rock)"	2014	—	Vagabond
"Starlight"	2018	—	Cavalier
"—" denotes an album that did not chart or was not released in that territory.

=== Live albums ===
- Eddi Reader Live (2001)
- Eddi Reader Live: Edinburgh (2003)
- Eddi Reader Live: Newcastle (2003)
- Eddi Reader Live: Leeds (2003)
- Eddi Reader Live: London (2003)
- St Clare's Night Out: Live at The Basement (2006)
- Port Fairy Folk Festival (2008)
- Live in Japan (2010)

=== Fairground Attraction ===
- The First of a Million Kisses (1988)
- Ay Fond Kiss (1990)
- Kawasaki – Live in Japan 02.07.89 (2003)
- The Very Best of Fairground Attraction (2004)
- Beautiful Happening (2024)

=== Film soundtracks ===
- Batman Forever: Music from the Motion Picture (1995)
  - "Nobody Lives Without Love"
- Bed of Roses (1996)
  - "The Right Place"
- Love & Sex (2000)
  - "Honeychild"
- My First Mister (2001)
  - "Bell, Book and Candle" (1999)

=== Collections ===
- The Blanco y Negro Years (2015)
- The Best of Eddi Reader (2016)
