= Boo Hewerdine =

English singer-songwriter

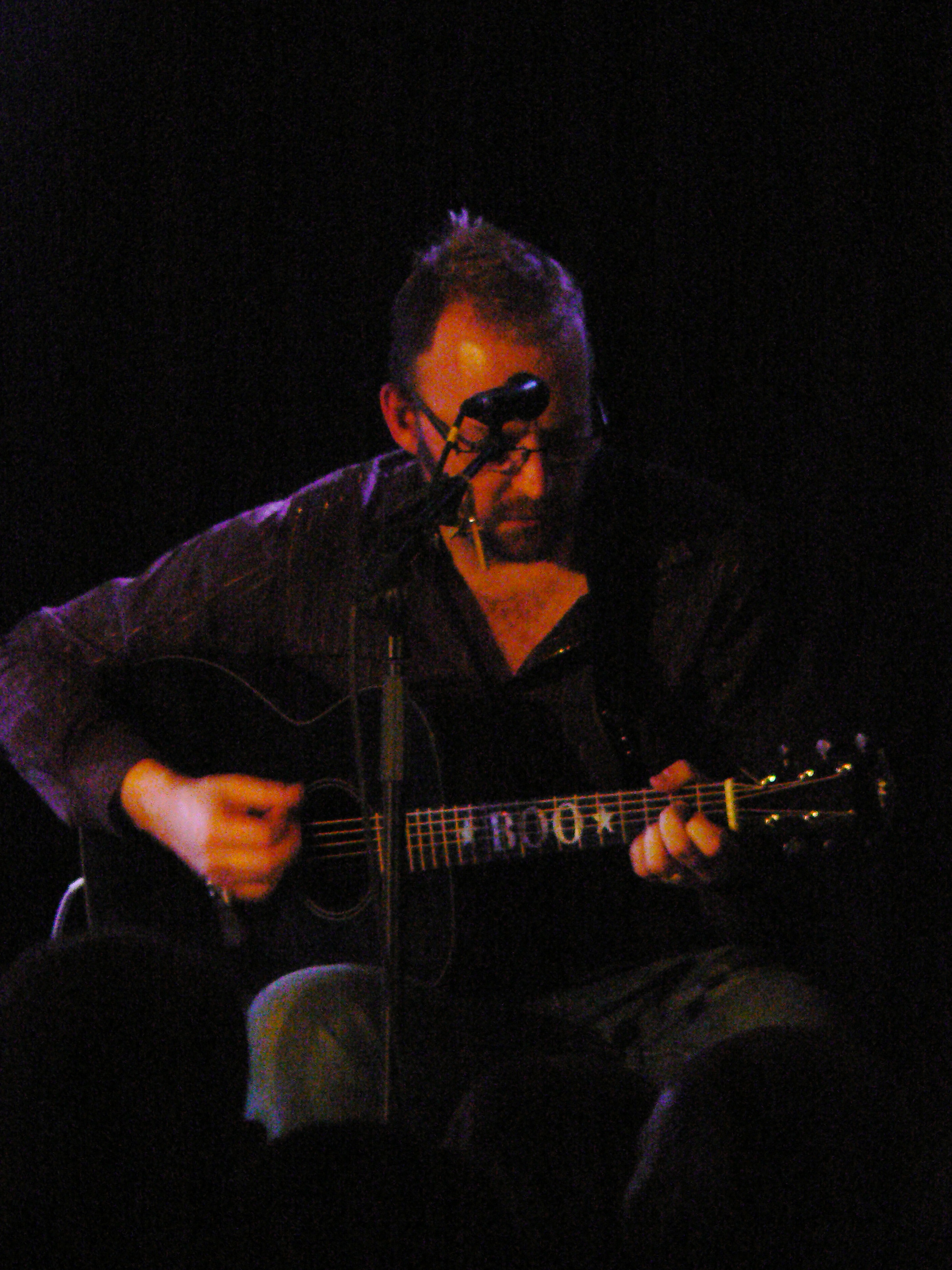
- Performing in 2009

Background information
- Born: Mark Hewerdine; 14 February 1961 (age 65); England
- Occupation: Singer-songwriter
- Years active: 1982–present
- Labels: Ensign, WEA, Compass, MVine, Navigator
- Website: boohewerdine.net

Mark "Boo" Hewerdine (born 14 February 1961) is an English singer-songwriter and record producer. His work includes lead singer and creative force behind The Bible, formed in the 1980s, and reformed in 1994, as well as solo recordings and work for film. He has also produced records by several artists, including a long association with Eddi Reader. He has been described as "one of Britain's most consistently accomplished songwriters".

== Career ==
=== Early life and The Great Divide ===
Born Mark Hewerdine he grew up in North London, before moving to Cambridge while still a child, and as a teenager formed the short-lived band Placebo Thing with a friend. He worked in the warehouse of Andy's Records in Bury St Edmunds, where he was exposed to a wide range of music. He joined The Great Divide in 1983, and the band were signed to Cambridge independent label Wimp Records by local entrepreneur David Gowar, and recorded and released their debut single "Who Broke the Love Bank" in 1982. They were heard by Mike Scott of The Waterboys, who recommended them to Ensign Records, who bought out their contract with Wimp, and they subsequently cut three commercially unsuccessful singles on Ensign.

=== The Bible ===
In 1985 Hewerdine, working once again in a record shop in Cambridge (The Beat Goes On), formed The Bible with jazz drummer Tony Shepherd, later recruiting former Great Divide bandmate Kevin Flanagan. They released an album of songs in 1986 through the independent Norwich label Backs Records called Walking The Ghost Back Home.

The Bible became a fairly successful independent band, with a cult following spread mostly through word of mouth and live performances. Two tracks from the first album, "Graceland" and "Mahalia" were released as singles, but failed to bring them commercial success. The album however was very well received by music pundits, and this brought the band to the attention of Chrysalis Records. Signing to Chrysalis at the end of 1986, "Graceland" was re-released as a single, and reached number 86 in the UK singles chart. A new album, the Steve Earle-produced Eureka followed, but failed commercially. A new version of "Graceland" gave the band their biggest hit (number 51) in 1989. In 1990, Hewerdine decided to leave the group and pursue solo projects.

=== Solo ===
At around this time Hewerdine was introduced by a label A&R man to US "new country" singer Darden Smith, and this set him off in a new direction. Working together, he and Smith wrote the album Evidence in around nine days. The album was released in 1989 to critical acclaim. The two went on to tour together in 1996. Hewerdine also worked on new solo songs, largely based on his earlier traumatic experiences in London. Eventually these were distilled down to produce his debut solo album proper, Ignorance, released in 1992. Invited by Tori Amos to play support promoting these songs, Hewerdine managed to find a new audience and Ignorance and a single from the album, "History", did relatively well commercially.

As Hewerdine's star rose, he started to write for other artists, among them Eddi Reader, Clive Gregson and Christine Collister. The Bible reformed in 1993 for a tour the following year and also released an EP of new material (The Dreamlife EP) and an album of b sides and extra's called Random Acts of Kindness. The band split again in December 1994 and a new album remained unreleased (the title was used for a later compilation), although songs from the album were re-recorded by Hewerdine on his John Wood-produced 1996 album Baptist Hospital, which featured contributions from Eddi Reader and Richard Thompson. Thanksgiving followed in 1999, which featured a guest appearance from Martha Wainwright and was described by Allmusic writer Rick Anderson as "sometimes very pretty in a Beatlesque way and sometimes moving", and Anon in 2002.

In 2001 Hewerdine was invited to act as 'songwriter in residence' at the Performing Rights Society's The Song's the Thing concert series in London, also performing at one of the concerts.

Harmonograph was released on MVine/Red Grape Records in February 2006, a collection of his songs originally recorded by other artists such as Eddi Reader and Hepburn, recorded by Hewerdine for the first time, with accompaniment from another former member of The Bible, Neill MacColl. The Toy Box nos. 1 and 2 EPs were released in 2008. God Bless The Pretty Things, was released in 2009. Recorded in Glasgow, with a band including John McCusker, Alan Kelly, Ewen Vernal, and Heidi Talbot, the album was described by the BBC as "timeless songs for all seasons" and "an album of unusual class and sensitivity". Scotland on Sunday gave the album a four-star review, calling it "exceptional, an album of superior Anglo-Saxon Americana".

In 2010 he appeared with Chris Difford and Justin Currie on BBC Four programme Songwriters' Circle.

=== State of the Union ===
Hewerdine first performed with Cambridge-based American guitarist Brooks Williams in 2010 after adding him to the bill of his annual Christmas show in his home town of Ely at the last minute when guests Chris Difford and Barry McGuigan were unable to attend due to weather conditions. In 2011, Hewerdine teamed up with Williams to form the band State of the Union. Their plan was to record an album using vintage microphones and equipment live at Kyoti Studio with Mark Freegard Glasgow studio in just five days, although they completed the album in only a day and a half. They followed the album with the EP Rent, the title track of which (a cover version of the Pet Shop Boys' song) was performed on The Andrew Marr Show in December 2012.

State of the Union played their first gig at the 2011 Ely Folk Festival, and played at the Celtic Connections festival in January 2012. The album was released in April 2012 on Reveal Records and was followed by a tour.

=== Film and television ===
Hewerdine was invited by Nick Hornby to write music for the soundtrack of the 1997 film adaptation of his book Fever Pitch. With Neill MacColl he also wrote music for the soundtrack of Shane Meadows' Twenty Four Seven and David Evans' television film Our Boy, both also from 1997. He also had a track included in the soundtrack of Christine Lahti's My First Mister (2001), and in 2003 his "Different God" was used in the film Intermission.

Hewerdine's song "Bell, Book and Candle" (from Thanksgiving) has been used in several television dramas, including an award-winning death scene in Emmerdale.

=== Production and writing work ===
Hewerdine collaborated over several years with Eddi Reader, as producer, songwriter and guitarist in her band. His song "Patience of Angels", originally written for The Bible, was recorded by Reader for her self-titled 1994 album, which featured several Hewerdine compositions, and was a top 40 hit in the UK Singles Chart when released as a single. Hewerdine also co-produced Eddi Reader's 1999 album Angels & Electricity and her 2003 album Sings the Songs of Robert Burns.

His other production work includes albums with The Corrs, Heidi Talbot, and Laurie Freelove. He co-wrote and produced Chris Difford's 2008 album The Last Temptation of Chris.

He has also written songs recorded by K.d. Lang ("Last Cigarette"), Paul Young, Melanie C, Marti Pellow, David McAlmont, Brian Kennedy, Kris Drever, Sarah Jane Morris, Alex Parks, and Natalie Imbruglia.

=== Awards and recognition ===
"Patience of Angels" brought a nomination for the Ivor Novello Award for Hewerdine in 1995.

In a 2009 review of his album God Bless the Pretty Things, the BBC described Hewerdine as "one of Britain's most consistently accomplished songwriters". Nick Coleman of The Independent on Sunday described Hewerdine as "one of the best songwriters we have". The Birmingham Evening Mail described him as "one of the country's finest lyricists".

== Discography ==
For his releases with The Bible see The Bible (band)#Discography

=== Albums ===
- Ignorance (1992), Ensign/Compass
- Baptist Hospital (1996), WEA
- Thanksgiving (1999), Compass
- Anon (2002), Haven
- Harmonograph (2005), MVine
- God Bless the Pretty Things (2009), Navigator – reissued in 2012 by Reveal Records as a 2-CD set including both Toy Box EPs
- Open (2015), Reveal
- Swimming In Mercury (2017), Reveal
- Before (2019), Reveal
- Understudy (2022), Reveal

with The Great Divide

- Money and Time (2007), Gott Discs

with Darden Smith

- Evidence (1989), Chrysalis/Capitol

with State of the Union

- State of the Union (2011) (with Brooks Williams), Reveal
- Snake Oil (2012) (with Brooks Williams), Reveal
- The Saltwell Sessions (2017) (with Brooks Williams), Reveal

Compilations

- A Live One (2002), Madan
- My Name In The Brackets (The Best Of Boo Hewerdine & The Bible) (2014), Reveal

=== EP's ===
- History (1992), Ensign
- 59 yds (1992), Ensign
- Extras (2001), Shellshock
- Ontario (2005), MVine
- Toy Box No. 1 (2008), Navigator
- Toy Box No. 2 (2008), Navigator
- Born (2016), Reveal
- A Letter To My Younger Self (2018), Reveal

with State of the Union

- Rent (2012) (with Brooks Williams), Reveal

with Kris Drever

- Last Man Standing (2015), Reveal

=== Singles ===
- "World's End" (1995), Blanco y Negro
- "Joke" (1996), Blanco y Negro

with The Great Divide

- "Who Broke The Love Bank" (1982), Wimp
- "Whispered In Heaven" (1983), Ensign
- "It's Got To Be Love" (1984), Blue Murder
- "Money And Time" (1984), Ensign

with Darden Smith

- "All I Want Is Everything" (1989), Ensign

with Eddi Reader and Clive Gregson

- "Wonderful Lie" (1993), Haven

=== Compilation appearances ===
- Rubber Folk: A Folk Tribute to the Beatles (2006), Gott Discs: "What Goes On" (Boo Hewerdine & Eddi Reader)

=== DVD ===
- Transatlantic Sessions 2 (2011) – Various Artists DVD
