= Through a Big Country: Greatest Hits =

Greatest hits album by Big Country
- Released: 14 May 1990
- Genres: Alternative rock, new wave, Celtic rock, folk rock, post-punk
- Length: 1:16:48
- Label: Mercury
- Producers: Steve Lillywhite, Robin Millar, Peter Wolf, Tim Palmer

Big Country chronology
Peace in Our Time (1988)	Through a Big Country: Greatest Hits (1990)	No Place Like Home (1991)

Professional ratings
Review scores
Source	Rating
New Musical Express	5/10
Select	3/5
Smash Hits	5/10

Through a Big Country: Greatest Hits is a greatest hits album released by the Scottish rock band Big Country in 1990. It reached No. 2 on the albums chart in the UK. The tracks 2, 3, 4, 5, 6, 7, 10, 17 were produced by Steve Lillywhite; the tracks 8, 11, 15, 16 were produced by Robin Millar; the tracks 9, 13, 14 were produced by Peter Wolf; a new song - track 1 produced by Tim Palmer.

All tracks are written by Stuart Adamson/Mark Brzezicki/Tony Butler/Bruce Watson, except where noted.

No.	Title	Writer(s)	Original Album	Length
1.	"Save Me"	Adamson	Previously unreleased	5:30
2.	"In a Big Country"		The Crossing	3:56
3.	"Fields of Fire (400 Miles)"		The Crossing	3:34
4.	"Chance"		The Crossing	4:41
5.	"Wonderland"		Single-only release	3:58
6.	"Where the Rose Is Sown"		Steeltown	4:12
7.	"Just a Shadow"		Steeltown	4:26
8.	"Look Away"	Adamson	The Seer	4:26
9.	"King of Emotion"	Adamson	Peace in Our Time	4:53
10.	"East of Eden"		Steeltown	4:13
11.	"One Great Thing"	Adamson, Butler	The Seer	4:03
12.	"The Teacher"	Adamson	The Seer	4:08
13.	"Broken Heart (Thirteen Valleys)"	Adamson	Peace in Our Time	4:48
14.	"Peace in Our Time"	Adamson	Peace in Our Time	4:36
15.	"Eiledon"	Adamson	The Seer	5:38
16.	"The Seer"	Adamson, Watson	The Seer	5:26
17.	"Harvest Home"		The Crossing	4:20
