= Eat the Rich =

Eat the rich is a slogan used in opposition to the wealthy class which has been used in various times.

== Music ==
- "Eat the Rich", a 1978 song by British Lions from the self-titled album
- "Eat the Rich", a 1983 song by Krokus from the album Headhunter
- "Eat the Rich", a 1986 song by Tysondog from the album Crimes of Insanity
- "Eat the Rich" (Motörhead song), a 1987 song by Motörhead composed for the Peter Richardson film of the same name
- "Eat the Rich" (Aerosmith song), a 1993 song by Aerosmith from the album Get a Grip
- "Eat the Rich", a 2000 song by Fozzy from the self-titled album
- Eat the Rich, a 2014 album by State of Mind
- "Eating the Rich", a 1994 song by The Lowest of the Low from the album Hallucigenia
- "Eat Rich", a 2014 song by Busdriver, from the album Perfect Hair

== Other uses ==
- Eat the Rich (film), a 1987 film directed by Peter Richardson
- Eat the Rich (book), a 1998 book by P. J. O'Rourke
- The Eat the Rich Gang, a political group involved in Fifth Estate, a radical journal produced in Detroit
