= List of The New York Times number-one books of 1992 =

The American daily newspaper The New York Times publishes multiple weekly lists ranking the best selling books in the United States.

== Fiction ==
The following list ranks the number-one best selling fiction books, in the hardcover fiction category.

Date	Book	Author
January 5	Scarlett	Alexandra Ripley
January 12	Scarlett	Alexandra Ripley
January 19	Scarlett	Alexandra Ripley
January 26	Scarlett	Alexandra Ripley
February 2	Hideaway	Dean Koontz
February 9	Hideaway	Dean Koontz
February 16	Hideaway	Dean Koontz
February 23	Hideaway	Dean Koontz
March 1	Rising Sun	Michael Crichton
March 8	Rising Sun	Michael Crichton
March 15	The Pelican Brief	John Grisham
March 22	The Pelican Brief	John Grisham
March 29	The Pelican Brief	John Grisham
April 5	The Pelican Brief	John Grisham
April 12	The Pelican Brief	John Grisham
April 19	The Pelican Brief	John Grisham
April 26	The Pelican Brief	John Grisham
May 3	The Pelican Brief	John Grisham
May 10	The Pelican Brief	John Grisham
May 17	Jewels	Danielle Steel
May 24	Jewels	Danielle Steel
May 31	Jewels	Danielle Steel
June 7	Jewels	Danielle Steel
June 14	Oh, the Places You'll Go!	Dr. Seuss
June 21	Oh, the Places You'll Go!	Dr. Seuss
June 28	Oh, the Places You'll Go!	Dr. Seuss
July 5	The Pelican Brief	John Grisham
July 12	The Pelican Brief	John Grisham
July 19	Gerald's Game	Stephen King
July 26	Gerald's Game	Stephen King
August 2	Gerald's Game	Stephen King
August 9	Gerald's Game	Stephen King
August 16	Gerald's Game	Stephen King
August 23	Gerald's Game	Stephen King
August 30	Gerald's Game	Stephen King
September 6	Gerald's Game	Stephen King
September 13	Gerald's Game	Stephen King
September 20	Where Is Joe Merchant?	Jimmy Buffett
September 27	The Pelican Brief	John Grisham
October 4	Where Is Joe Merchant?	Jimmy Buffett
October 11	Where Is Joe Merchant?	Jimmy Buffett
October 18	The Stars Shine Down	Sidney Sheldon
October 25	The Tale of the Body Thief	Anne Rice
November 1	The Tale of the Body Thief	Anne Rice
November 8	The Tale of the Body Thief	Anne Rice
November 15	The Tale of the Body Thief	Anne Rice
November 22	Mixed Blessings	Danielle Steel
November 29	Mixed Blessings	Danielle Steel
December 6	Dolores Claiborne	Stephen King
December 13	Dolores Claiborne	Stephen King
December 20	Dolores Claiborne	Stephen King
December 27	Dolores Claiborne	Stephen King

== Nonfiction ==
The following list ranks the number-one best selling nonfiction books, in the hardcover nonfiction category.

Date	Book	Author
January 5	Me: Stories of My Life	Katharine Hepburn
January 12	Me: Stories of My Life	Katharine Hepburn
January 19	Den of Thieves	James B. Stewart
January 26	Den of Thieves	James B. Stewart
February 2	Den of Thieves	James B. Stewart
February 9	Revolution from Within	Gloria Steinem
February 16	Revolution from Within	Gloria Steinem
February 23	Revolution from Within	Gloria Steinem
March 1	Revolution from Within	Gloria Steinem
March 8	Revolution from Within	Gloria Steinem
March 15	Revolution from Within	Gloria Steinem
March 22	Revolution from Within	Gloria Steinem
March 29	Revolution from Within	Gloria Steinem
April 5	Revolution from Within	Gloria Steinem
April 12	Revolution from Within	Gloria Steinem
April 19	Revolution from Within	Gloria Steinem
April 26	Revolution from Within	Gloria Steinem
May 3	Revolution from Within	Gloria Steinem
May 10	Give War a Chance	P. J. O'Rourke
May 17	Give War a Chance	P. J. O'Rourke
May 24	Revolution from Within	Gloria Steinem
May 31	Give War a Chance	P. J. O'Rourke
June 7	The Silent Passage	Gail Sheehy
June 14	The Silent Passage	Gail Sheehy
June 21	The Silent Passage	Gail Sheehy
June 28	The Silent Passage	Gail Sheehy
July 5	Diana: Her True Story	Andrew Morton
July 12	Diana: Her True Story	Andrew Morton
July 19	Diana: Her True Story	Andrew Morton
July 26	Diana: Her True Story	Andrew Morton
August 2	Diana: Her True Story	Andrew Morton
August 9	Diana: Her True Story	Andrew Morton
August 16	Diana: Her True Story	Andrew Morton
August 23	The Silent Passage	Gail Sheehy
August 30	The Silent Passage	Gail Sheehy
September 6	The Silent Passage	Gail Sheehy
September 13	Every Living Thing	James Herriot
September 20	Every Living Thing	James Herriot
September 27	The Way Things Ought to Be	Rush H. Limbaugh
October 4	The Way Things Ought to Be	Rush H. Limbaugh
October 11	The Way Things Ought to Be	Rush H. Limbaugh
October 18	The Way Things Ought to Be	Rush H. Limbaugh
October 25	The Way Things Ought to Be	Rush H. Limbaugh
November 1	The Way Things Ought to Be	Rush H. Limbaugh
November 8	Sex	Madonna
November 15	Sex	Madonna
November 22	Sex	Madonna
November 29	The Way Things Ought to Be	Rush H. Limbaugh
December 6	The Way Things Ought to Be	Rush H. Limbaugh
December 13	The Way Things Ought to Be	Rush H. Limbaugh
December 20	The Way Things Ought to Be	Rush H. Limbaugh
December 27	The Way Things Ought to Be	Rush H. Limbaugh

== See also ==
- Publishers Weekly list of bestselling novels in the United States in the 1990s
