= Heart of the World (song) =

Single by Big Country
- Released: 9 July 1990
- Length: 4:41
- Label: Mercury
- Songwriter(s): Stuart Adamson
- Producer(s): Tim Palmer

Big Country singles chronology
"Save Me" (1990)	"Heart of the World" (1990)	"Republican Party Reptile" (1991)

"Heart of the World" is a song by Scottish rock band Big Country, released in 1990 as a non-album single. It was written by Stuart Adamson and produced by Tim Palmer. "Heart of the World" reached number 50 on the UK Singles Chart and remained in the top 100 for three weeks.

== Background ==
During March 1990, Big Country spent time recording two new songs, "Save Me" and "Heart of the World", at Livingston Studios in London. The tracks that would emerge as B-sides on the singles were recorded at Chipping Norton Studios in Oxford during the same month. With drummer Mark Brzezicki's departure from the band in 1989, the sessions featured Pat Ahern on drums.

"Save Me" was released as a single in April 1990 and reached number 41 in the UK Singles Chart. "Heart of the World" followed as a single in July and reached number 50 in the UK. The band originally wanted "Heart of the World" to be released as the first single of the two, but the band's label, Mercury, opted for "Save Me" instead. Unlike "Save Me", "Heart of the World" was not included on the band's compilation album Through a Big Country: Greatest Hits (1990).

Speaking of "Heart of the World", bassist Tony Butler told the Aberdeen Evening Express in July 1990, "It's a simple song about belief in oneself. Throughout time people have followed guidelines set by heroes, and that's a positive human attitude we want to encourage."

== Music video ==
The song's music video was directed by Howard Greenhalgh. In 1991, Adamson picked it as his favourite Big Country video.

== Critical reception ==
Upon its release, David Giles of Music Week considered "a small hit [to be] on the cards for this standard, slightly anthemic, Adamson composition". Louise Philip of The Press and Journal gave the single three stars and commented: "Sounding more raw than usual, the only real letdown is the guitar solo which sounds too much like 'One Great Thing'." David Ewen of the Aberdeen Evening Express described "Heart of the World" as "a strong song, rendered in [Big Country's] own inimitable style". Jon Homer, reviewing the single for Channel 4's Teletext service, described the song as "another slice of anthemic guitar rock that manages to be as powerful as the loudest heavy metal band, but several times more effective and intelligent". He predicted the song would be a "minor hit perhaps".

== Track listing ==
7-inch and cassette single

1. "Heart of the World" – 4:41
2. "Black Skinned Blue Eyed Boys" – 3:21

12-inch single

1. "Heart of the World" – 4:41
2. "Black Skinned Blue Eyed Boys" –- 3:21
3. "Troubled Man" – 4:21

12-inch single (limited edition)

1. "Heart of the World" – 4:41
2. "Peace in Our Time" (Acoustic) – 3:06
3. "Thirteen Valleys" (Acoustic) – 3:59

CD single

1. "Heart of the World" – 4:41
2. "Black Skinned Blue Eyed Boys" – 3:21
3. "Restless Natives" – 4:21

== Personnel ==
Big Country

- Stuart Adamson – vocals, guitar
- Bruce Watson – guitar
- Tony Butler – bass
- Pat Ahern – drums

Production

- Tim Palmer – producer of "Heart of the World"
- Big Country – producers of "Black Skinned Blue Eyed Boys" and "Troubled Man"
- Geoff Emerick – producer of "Restless Natives"
- Stuart Adamson – producer of "Restless Natives", "Peace in Our Time" and "Thirteen Valleys"

Other

- Zarkowski Designs – artwork

== Charts ==
Chart (1990)	Peak position
UK Singles Chart	50
