= Republican Party Reptile (song) =

Single by Big Country

from the album No Place Like Home
- Released: 19 August 1991
- Length: 3:54
- Label: Vertigo
- Songwriters: Stuart Adamson; Bruce Watson
- Producer: Pat Moran

Big Country singles chronology
"Heart of the World" (1990)	"Republican Party Reptile" (1991)	"Beautiful People" (1991)

"Republican Party Reptile" is a song by Scottish rock band Big Country, released by Vertigo in 1991 as an extended play from their fifth studio album No Place Like Home. It was written by Stuart Adamson and Bruce Watson, and produced by Pat Moran. The "Republican Party Reptile" EP reached No. 37 in the UK and remained in the charts for two weeks. A music video was filmed to promote the EP.

P. J. O'Rourke's 1987 essay collection, Republican Party Reptile, served as inspiration for the song and O'Rourke is mentioned by name in the song's first verse.

== Background ==
The song is named after a collection of essays (Republican Party Reptile) published in 1987 by P. J. O'Rourke. In a 1991 interview for the Big Country fanzine Inwards, Stuart Adamson described the song as being about politicians: "Here it would be a Northern politician, the bitter-drinking, baby-kissing fat guy with the Burton suit that's always creased when he stands up on the telly! In America it would be one of those Republican guys going around with a big ten-gallon hat on and wearing a poly-viscose suit and tan loafers. It's just about one of those characters really, a corrupt politician."

"Republican Party Reptile" was the first Big Country track that Watson contributed some lyrics to, rather than just music. He wrote the lyrics of the song's chorus.

== Critical reception ==
Upon its release, Steve Stewart of the Aberdeen Press and Journal commented, "Gone are the wimpy keyboard overlays of the Peace in Our Time phase, and back are the grating guitars of The Crossing and Steeltown. This four-track offering still has a sound all its own and a slightly different vocal style from Adamson." Steven Wells of NME stated, "I'm never going to play this again but it be a very ZZ Top-esque and sardonic number about wanting to make touchyfeelylickylicky with a Tory. Curious." Ian Gittins of Melody Maker wrote, "In which the caber-tossing, girder monsters attempt their 'Subterranean Homesick Blues' and rail against all things right-wing. As you'd expect, it shimmers rather less than does Prince. Adamson may leave us in no doubt he's voting Labour, but does this labour." In a review of No Place Like Home, Tom Demalon of AllMusic noted that the song "sounds like the band had picked up a few tricks from one-time support act the Cult".

== Track listing ==
7" single

1. "Republican Party Reptile" - 3:54
2. "Comes a Time" - 3:53
3. "You, Me and the Truth" - 4:20

12" single

1. "Republican Party Reptile" - 3:54
2. "Freedom Song" - 4:31
3. "Kiss the Girl Goodbye" - 5:12
4. "I'm Only Waiting" - 4:36

CD single

1. "Republican Party Reptile" - 3:54
2. "Freedom Song" - 4:31
3. "Kiss the Girl Goodbye" - 5:12
4. "I'm Only Waiting" - 4:36

== Personnel ==
Big Country

- Stuart Adamson - vocals, guitar
- Bruce Watson - guitar
- Tony Butler - bass

Additional musicians

- Mark Brzezicki - drums
- Katie Kissoon, Carol Kenyon - backing vocals

Production

- Pat Moran - producer and engineer (all tracks except "I'm Only Waiting")
- Big Country - producers of "I'm Only Waiting"

Other

- Zarkowski Designs - sleeve design, artwork

== Charts ==
Chart (1991)	Peak position
UK Singles (OCC)	37
UK Airplay (Music Week)	44
