= Poverty in Africa =

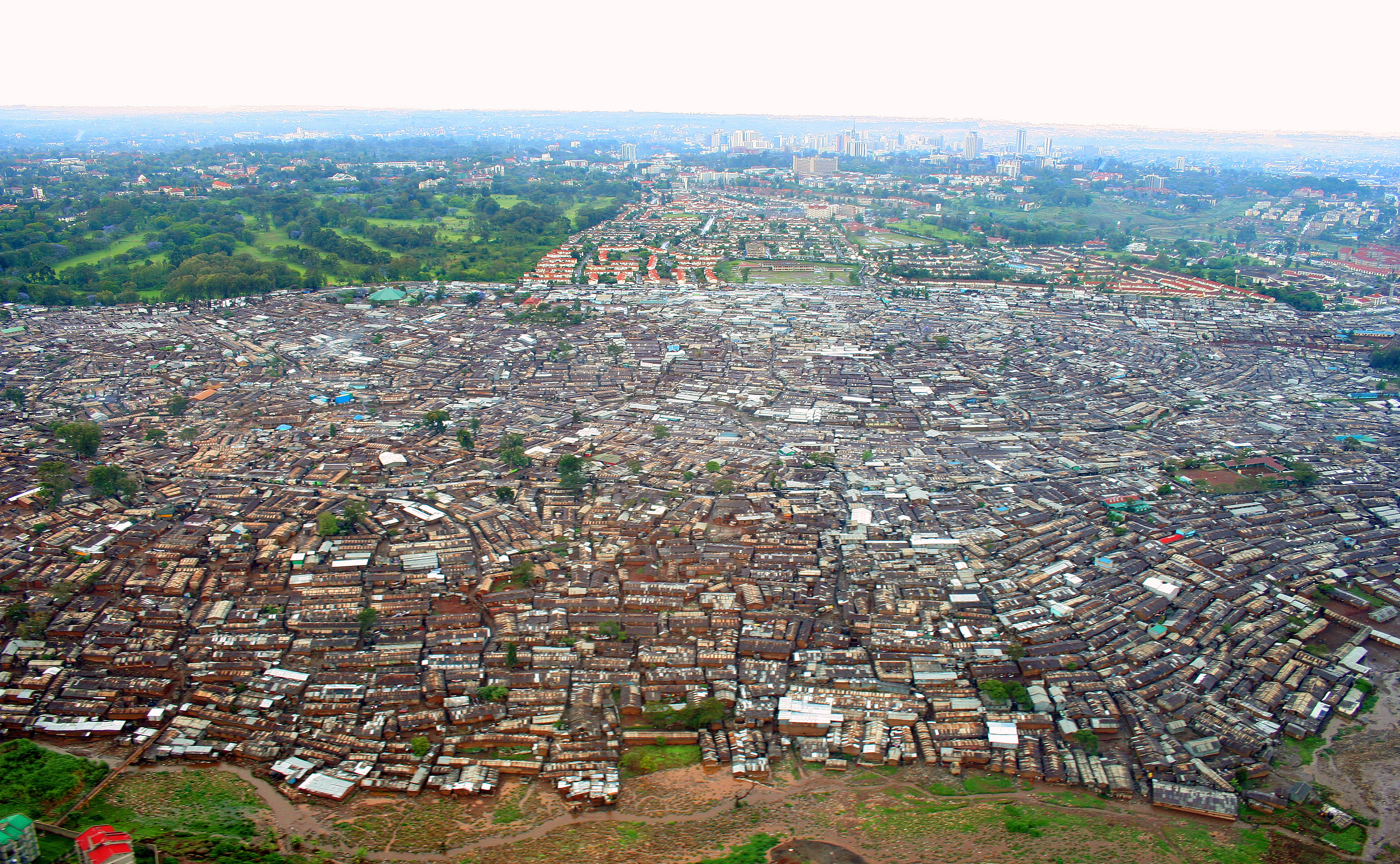
Kibera is the largest slum in Nairobi, Kenya.

Poverty in Africa is the lack of provision to satisfy the basic human needs of certain people in Africa. African nations typically fall toward the bottom of any list measuring small size economic activity, such as income per capita or GDP per capita, despite a wealth of natural resources. Although there are more African nations in medium, high and very high human development than low (31 countries), 23 of 25 nations identified as having "Low Human Development" on the United Nations' (UN) Human Development Index were in Africa. As of 2019, 424 million people in sub-Saharan Africa were reportedly living in severe poverty. In 2022, 460 million people—an increase of 36 million in only three years—were anticipated to be living in extreme poverty as a result of the COVID-19 pandemic and the Russo-Ukrainian war.

In 2006, 34 of the 50 nations on the UN list of least developed countries were in Africa. In many nations, GDP per capita is less than US$5200 per year, with the vast majority of the population living on much less (according to World Bank data, by 2016 the island nation of Seychelles was the only African country with a GDP per capita above US$10,000 per year). In addition, Africa's share of income has been consistently dropping over the past century by any measure. In 1820, the average European worker earned about three times what the average African did. Now, the average European earns twenty times what the average African does. Although GDP per capita incomes in Africa have also been steadily growing, measures are still far better in other parts of the world.

== Mismanagement of land ==
Despite large amounts of arable land south of the Sahara Desert, small, individual land holdings are rare. In many nations, the land is subject to tribal ownership. Many nations lack a system of freehold landowning. In others, the laws prevent people from disadvantaged groups from owning land at all. Although often these laws are ignored, and land sales to disadvantaged groups occur, legal title to the land is not assured. As such, rural Africans rarely have clear title to their own land and have to survive as farm laborers. Unused land is plentiful but is often private property. Most African nations have very poor land registration systems, making squatting and land-theft common occurrences. This makes it difficult to get a mortgage or similar loan, as ownership of the property often cannot be established to the satisfaction of financiers.

This system often gives an advantage to one native African group over another and is not just Europeans over Africans. For example, it was hoped that land reform in Zimbabwe would transfer land from European landowners to family farmers. Instead, it simply substituted native Africans with ties to the government for Europeans, leaving much of the population disadvantaged. Because of this abuse, foreign aid that was destined for land purchases was withdrawn. (See Land reform in Zimbabwe)

Historically, such programs have been few and far between, with much foreign aid being concentrated on the raising of cash crops and large plantations rather than family farms.

There is no consensus on what the optimal strategy for land use in Africa may be. Studies by the National Academy of Sciences have suggested great promise in relying on native crops as a means of improving Africa's food security. A report by Future Harvest suggests that traditionally used forage plants show the same promise. Supporting a different viewpoint is an article appearing in AgBioForum which suggests that smallholder farmers benefited substantially by planting a genetically modified variety of maize. In a similar vein is an article discussing the use of nontraditional crops for export published as part of the proceedings of a Purdue University symposium.

== Misused money ==
Between 1960 and 1997, foreign nations sent over US$500 billion to African nations in the form of direct aid. The consensus is that the money has had little long-term effect. The Cato Institute argues this is because, rather than increasing development, financial aid creates dependence on foreign investments. For example, as of 2005, the budgets of Ghana and Uganda were more than 50 percent aid-dependent. In 2002, then-president of Senegal, economist Abdoulaye Wade, stated, "'I've never seen a country develop itself through aid or credit. Countries that have developed - in Europe, America, Japan, Asian countries like Taiwan, Korea and Singapore - have all believed in free markets. There is no mystery there. Africa took the wrong road after independence.''

In addition, most African nations have owed substantial sums of money. However, a large percentage of the money was either invested in weapons (money that was spent back in developed nations, and provided little or no benefit to the native population) or was directly misappropriated by corrupt governments. As such, many newly democratic nations in Africa are saddled with debt run up by totalitarian regimes. Large debts usually result in little being spent on social services, such as education, pensions, or medical care. In addition, most of the debt currently owed (approximately US$321 billion in 1996) represents only the interest portion on the debt, and far exceeds the amounts that were actually borrowed (although this is true of large debts in developed nations as well). Authors Leonce Ndikumana and James K. Boyce estimate that from 1970 to 2008, capital flight from 33 sub-Saharan countries totalled $700 billion. Most African nations are pushing for debt relief, as they are effectively unable to maintain payments on debt without extending the debt payments indefinitely. However, most plans to forgive debt affect only the smallest nations, and large debtor nations, like Nigeria, are often excluded from such plans.

What large sums of money that are in Africa are often used to develop mega-projects when the need is for smaller scale projects. For example, Ghana was the richest country in Africa when it obtained independence. However, a few years later, it had no foreign reserves of any consequence. The money was spent on large projects that turned out to be a waste of resources:

- The Akosombo Dam was built to supply electricity for the extraction of aluminium from bauxite. Unfortunately, Ghanaian ores turned out to be too low grade and the electricity is now used to process ores from other nations.
- Storage silos for the storage of cocoa were built to allow Ghana to take advantage of fluctuations in the commodity prices. Unfortunately, unprocessed cocoa does not react well to even short-term storage and the silos now sit empty.

Another example of misspent money is the Aswan High Dam. The dam was supposed to have modernized Egypt and Sudan immediately. Instead, the block of the natural flow of the Nile River meant that the Nile's natural supply of nitrate fertilizer and organic material was blocked. Now, about one-third of the dam's electric output goes directly into fertilizer production for what was previously the most fertile area on the planet. Moreover, the dam is silting up and may cease to serve any useful purpose within the next few centuries. In addition, the Mediterranean Sea is slowly becoming more saline as the Nile River previously provided it with most of its new fresh water influx.

Corruption is also a major problem in the region, although it is certainly not universal or limited to Africa. Many native groups in Africa prioritize family relationships over national identity, so people in authority often use nepotism and bribery for the benefit of their extended family group at the expense of their nations. For example, the Congolese president Mobutu Sese Seko became notorious for corruption, nepotism, and the embezzlement of between US$4 billion and $15 billion during his reign. Despite this, corrupt governments often do better than authoritarian ones that replace them. For example, under Ethiopian emperor Haile Selassie, corruption was rife and poverty rampant. After his overthrow, corruption was lessened, but famine and military aggressiveness came to the fore. In any event, corruption both diverts aid money and foreign investment (which is usually sent to offshore banks outside of Africa), and puts a heavy burden on native populations forced to pay bribes to get basic government services.

In the end, foreign aid may not even be helpful in the long run to many African nations. It often encourages them not to tax internal economic activities of multinational corporations within their borders to attract foreign investment. In addition, most African nations have at least some wealthy nationals, and foreign aid often allows them to avoid paying more than negligible taxes. As such, wealth redistribution and capital controls are often seen as a more appropriate way for African nations to stabilize funding for their government budgets and smooth out the boom and bust cycles that can often arise in a developing economy. However, this sort of strategy often leads to internal political dissent and capital flight. Sub-Saharan Africa's government debt rose from 28% of gross domestic product in 2012 to 50% of gross domestic product in 2019. The COVID-19 pandemic caused it to rise to 57% of gross domestic product in 2021. In February 2024, following a large-scale trafficking of currency devices, the West African Monetary Union (UEMOA) and the Economic and Monetary Community of Central Africa (CEMAC), responsible for the monetary management of the CFA franc zone, and the Bank of France, which produces CFA franc coins, these central banks want to equip the CFA franc coins with a new alloy guaranteeing the security of the monetary circuit of the CFA franc zone, according to the International Copper Study Group (ICSG), the metal used to manufacture CFA franc coins, is prized because of its market value, The Economic and Monetary Community of Central Africa opened the first investigations in 2019, after noting the disappearance of CFA franc currency devices within the organization.

== Human resources ==
Map of countries and territories by fertility rate as of 2020

A segment of Africa's population receive low wages or do not have stable employment. Real wages increased from 2006 to 2017, but the continent's average real wages has since been declining. As many as 85% of people in Africa subsist on less than $5.50 per day.

Two-thirds of the labor force are men and one-third are women. Women on average receive lower wages than men.

The International Labour Organization (ILO) recommends legislation and minimum wage policies to address low wages and wage inequalities in Africa. The ILO also encourages the promotion collective bargaining that covers a large part of worker population and addresses gender pay gaps.

The widespread availability of cheap labor has often perpetuated policies that encourage inefficient agricultural and industrial practices, leaving Africa further impoverished. For example, author P.J. O'Rourke noted on his trip to Tanzania for his book Eat the Rich that gravel was produced with manual labor (by pounding rocks with tools), wherein almost everywhere else in the world machines did the same work far more cheaply and efficiently. He used Tanzania as an example of a nation with superb natural resources that nevertheless was among the poorest nations in the world.

== Education ==
Education is also a major problem, even in the wealthier nations. Illiteracy rates are high although a good proportion of Africans speak at least two languages and a number speak three (generally their native language, a neighbouring or trade language, and a European language). Higher education is almost unheard of, although certain universities in Egypt and South Africa have excellent reputations. However, some African nations have a paucity of persons with university degrees, and advanced degrees are rare in most areas. As such, the continent, for the most part, lacks scientists, engineers, and even teachers. The seeming parody of aid workers attempting to teach trilingual people English is not entirely untrue.

== Disease ==
The greatest mortality in Africa arises from preventable water-borne diseases, which affect infants and young children greater than any other group. The principal cause of these diseases is the regional water crisis, or lack of safe drinking water primarily stemming from mixing sewage and drinking water supplies.

Much attention has been given to the prevalence of AIDS in Africa. 3,000 Africans die each day of AIDS and an additional 11,000 are infected. Less than one percent are actually treated. However, even with the widespread prevalence of AIDS (where infection rates can approach 30% among the sexually active population), and fatal infections such as the Ebola virus, other diseases are far more problematic. In fact, the situation with AIDS is improving in some nations as infection rates drop, and deaths from Ebola are rare. On the other hand, diseases once common but now almost unknown in most of the industrialized world, like malaria, tuberculosis, tapeworm and dysentery often claim far more victims, particularly among the young. Polio has made a comeback recently due to misinformation spread by anti-American Islamic groups in Nigeria. Diseases native to Africa, such as sleeping sickness, also resist attempts at elimination too.

== Poor infrastructure ==
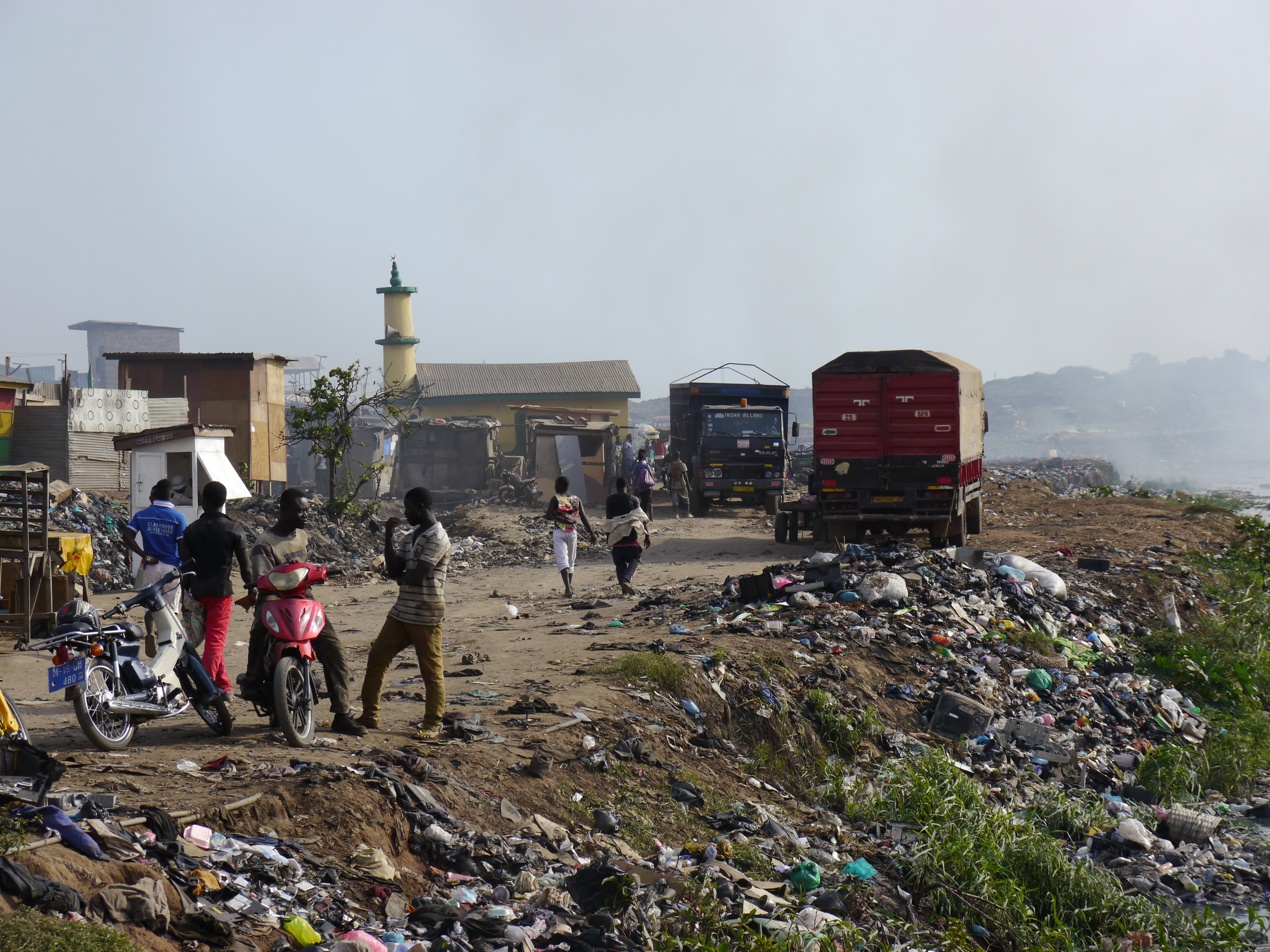
People in Agbogbloshie, near the center of Accra, Ghana's capital city

Clean potable water is rare in most of Africa (even those parts outside the sub-Saharan region) despite the fact that the continent is crossed by several major rivers and contains some of the largest freshwater lakes in the world. However, many of the major population centres are coastal, and few major cities have adequate sewage treatment systems. Although boiling water is a possibility, fuel for boiling is scarce as well. The problem is worst in Africa's rapidly growing cities, such as Cairo, Lagos and Kinshasa.

Colonialism concentrated on connecting the coast with internal territories. As such, nearly none of Africa's roads and railways connect with each other in any meaningful way. Connecting Africa's extensive railway network has recently become a priority for African nations outside of southwest Africa, which has an integrated network.

Transportation between neighbouring coastal settlements is nearly always by sea, no matter the topography of the land in between them. Even basic services like telecommunications are often treated the same way. For example, phone calls between Ghana and neighbouring Ivory Coast once had to be routed through Britain and France.

Although Africa had numerous pre-European overland trade routes, few are suitable for modern transport such as trucks or railways, especially when they cross old European colonial borders. Another problem is that in many countries the roads, railway tracks, railway rolling stock, ships and ports are often old and badly maintained and many transportation systems have barely been updated and further developed since the end of colonialism.

== Conflict ==
Despite other hot spots for war, Africa consistently remains among the top places for ongoing conflicts, consisting of both long-standing civil wars (e.g. Somalia, Democratic Republic of the Congo), ethnic conflicts that even resulted in genocides (e.g. the Rwandan genocide) and conflicts between countries.

The long-standing civil wars are in part due to the border-drawing of the late 19th century's Scramble for Africa, which did not take into account the various ethnic groups due to lack of local knowledge and research. Post decolonization, the European-set borders were accepted by various leaders; however, there remains internal and cross-border struggles, and separatist concerns by popular demand to the governments as they transition to democracy, leading to fears of further destabilization.

In recent years, religious conflicts have also increased, with Islamistic paramilitary terrorist groups like Boko Haram (Nigeria) and Al-Shabaab (Somalia) having committed many brutal, deadly terrorist acts that further decrease safety and prospects of development in the concerned regions. Despite a lack of basic social services or even the basic necessities of life, military forces are often well-financed and well-equipped.

Acts of war and terrorism further harm the chances of development in the regions concerned as they do not only cause economic downturns but also cause severe damage to the often already underdeveloped infrastructure as well as government shutdowns, further worsen the often already tense safety situation and cause large numbers of refugees.

As a result, Africa is full of refugees, who are often deliberately displaced by military forces during a conflict, rather than just having fled from war-torn areas. Although many refugees emigrate to open countries such as Germany, Canada, and the United States, the ones who do emigrate are often the most educated and skilled. The remainder often become a burden on neighbouring African nations that, while peaceful, are generally unable to deal with the logistical problems refugees pose as these nations are often already barely capable of fulfilling the needs of their own population.

Civil war usually has the result of totally shutting down all government services. However, any conflict generally disrupts what trade or economy there is. Sierra Leone, which depends on diamonds for much of its economic activity, not only faces disruption in production (which reduces the supply), but a thriving black market in conflict diamonds, which drives down the price for what diamonds are produced.

== Climate change ==
The link between climate change and poverty has been examined. Climate change is likely to increase the size, frequency, and unpredictability of natural hazards. However, there is nothing natural about the transformation of natural hazards into disasters. The severity of a disaster's impact is dependent on existing levels of vulnerability, the extent of exposure to disaster event and the nature of the hazard. A community's risk to disaster is dynamic and will change over time. It is heavily influenced by the interplay between economic, socio-cultural and demographic factors, as well as skewed development, such as rapid and unplanned urbanisation.

The level of poverty is a key determinant of disaster risk. Poverty increases propensity and severity of disasters and reduces peoples' capacity to recover and reconstruct. However, vulnerability is not just shaped to poverty, but linked to wider social, political and institutional factors, that govern entitlements and capabilities.

== Effects of poverty ==
African countries by Human Development Index 2019 (higher values indicate higher standards of living): ≥ 0.900 0.850–0.899 0.800–0.849 0.750–0.799 0.700–0.749 0.650–0.699 0.600–0.649 / 0.550–0.599 0.500–0.549 0.450–0.499 0.400–0.449 ≤ 0.399 Data unavailable

Africa's economic malaise is self-perpetuating, as it engenders more of the disease, warfare, misgovernment, and corruption that created it in the first place. Other effects of poverty have similar consequences. The most direct consequence of low GDP is Africa's low standard of living and quality of life. Except for a wealthy elite and the more prosperous peoples of South Africa and the Maghreb, Africans have very few consumer goods. Quality of life does not correlate exactly with a nation's wealth. Angola, for instance, reaps large sums annually from its diamond mines, but after years of civil war, conditions there remain poor. Radios, televisions, and automobiles are rare luxuries. Most Africans are on the far side of the digital divide and are cut off from communications technology and the Internet, however, use of mobile phones has been growing dramatically in recent years with 65% of Africans having access to a mobile phone as of 2011. Quality of life and human development are also low. African nations dominate the lower reaches of the UN Human Development Index. Infant mortality is high, while life expectancy, literacy, and education are all low. The UN also lowers the ranking of African states because the continent sees greater inequality than any other region. The best educated often choose to leave the continent for the West or the Persian Gulf to seek a better life.

Catastrophes cause deadly periods of great shortages. The most damaging are the famines that have regularly hit the continent, especially the Horn of Africa. These have been caused by disruptions due to warfare, years of drought, and plagues of locusts.

An average African faced annual inflation of over 60% from 1990 until 2002 in those few countries that account for inflation. At the high end, Angola and the Democratic Republic of the Congo both saw triple-digit inflation throughout the period. Most African nations saw inflation of approximately 10% per year.

== See also ==
- Economy of Africa
- Causes of poverty in South Africa
- Poverty in Nigeria
- List of African millionaires
- List of countries by percentage of population living in poverty
- List of African countries by Human Development Index

== Bibliography ==
published in 20th century

- Founou-Tchuigoua, Bernard Food self-sufficiency: Crisis of the collective ideology African agriculture: The critical choices. United Nations University Press (1990) ISBN 0-86232-798-9
- National Academy of Sciences Lost Crops of Africa:Grains ISBN 0-309-04990-3 publication announcement 4 March 1996
- Milich, Lenard (1997) Food security in Pre-Colonial Hausaland

published in the 21st century

- Okunlola, Paul (24 June 2002) Poverty and population in Lagos. People & the Planet
- Singh, B.P. (2002) Nontraditional crop production in Africa for export. p. 86–92. In: J. Janick and A. Whipkey (eds.), Trends in new crops and new uses. ASHS Press, Alexandria, VA.
- IRIN News Land reform in Southern Africa July 2003.
- IRIN News Zimbabwe: Land reform omits farm workers Land reform in Southern Africa July 2003.
- IRIN News South Africa: Land ownership remains racially skewed 24 May 2005.
- Gouse, Marnus et al. Three seasons of subsistence insect-resistant maize in South Africa: have smallholders benefited? AgBioForum Volume 9, No. 1 (2006)
- "Africa's middle class: Few and far between", The Economist, UK, 22 October 2015
