= Non! (Big Country EP) =

EP by Big Country
- Released: 27 November 1995
- Label: Transatlantic
- Producer: Big Country; Chris Sheldon

Big Country chronology
You Dreamer (1995)	Non! (1995)	Fragile Thing (1999)

Non! is an extended play by Scottish rock band Big Country, which was released in the UK in 1995 as an action awareness record for Greenpeace. Non! reached No. 77 in the UK Singles Chart in December 1995.

== Background ==
"This is our way of protesting against the French government's policy of carrying out needless nuclear tests in a post-nuclear age."

— Adamson discussing the purpose of the EP to the Nottingham Evening Post in 1995.

Non! was released as an action awareness record for Greenpeace in their campaign against France's nuclear testing at Moruroa. The EP was rush-released in November 1995 to "add energy to the movement and to try and raise much-needed funds". The band's late 1995 UK tour was also organised to benefit Greenpeace and raise awareness of the campaign.

Three of the four songs on the single were taken from the band's seventh studio album Why the Long Face. Adamson revealed in a press release associated with the EP: "Of the tracks we had on Why the Long Face, "Post Nuclear Talking Blues" and "Blue On a Green Planet" seemed the most fitting. We have been on tour all summer so unfortunately the time wasn't available to record any new tracks."

Non! peaked at No. 77 in the UK Singles Chart. The four-track EP's leading track "Post Nuclear Talking Blues" was issued as a one-track promotional single to generate radio play.

The band's manager Ian Grant told the official Country Club fanzine in 1996: "No money was raised to speak of with regard to the EP but over £10,000 was raised on the tour, new members were recruited and a lot of publicity was generated."

== Critical reception ==
Music Week noted there was "a more folky tilt to this anti-nuclear testing four-track EP". JT Griffith of AllMusic gave the EP three out of five stars and described "All Go Together" as the "standout track", with the EP's "political context giv[ing] the song a new depth and poignancy".

== Track listing ==
CD EP

1. "Post Nuclear Talking Blues" - 3:22
2. "Blue On a Green Planet" - 4:52
3. "God's Great Mistake" - 4:50
4. "All Go Together" (Acoustic) - 3:19

CD single (promo)

1. "Post Nuclear Talking Blues" - 3:22

== Personnel ==
Big Country

- Stuart Adamson – vocals, guitar
- Bruce Watson – guitar
- Tony Butler – bass, backing vocals
- Mark Brzezicki – drums, percussion, backing vocals

Production

- Chris Sheldon – producer on all tracks except "All Go Together"
- Big Country – producers (all tracks)

Other

- S.W.I.M. Multimedia – Chirac illustrations

== Charts ==
Chart (1995)	Peak position
UK Singles (OCC)	77
