= Republican Party Reptile =

1987 book by P.J. O'Rourke

- First edition
- Author: P. J. O'Rourke
- Language: English
- Genre: Essay collection
- Publisher: Atlantic Monthly Press
- Publication date: 1987
- Publication place: United States
- Media type: Print (paperback)
- Pages: 220
- ISBN: 978-0-330-30032-2
- OCLC: 14586585

Republican Party Reptile, subtitled The Confessions, Adventures, Essays and (Other) Outrages of P. J. O'Rourke is a 1987 collection of essays by American satirical writer P. J. O'Rourke. Some of the works were previously published in House & Garden and Harper's. O'Rourke planned to promote the book at the 1988 Republican National Convention. Though he described himself as a conservative Republican, this was not allowed, reportedly because the GOP did not appreciate O'Rourke's sense of humor. In the essay that gives its title to the collection O'Rourke describes a "Republican Party Reptile":

We are in favor of: guns, drugs, fast cars, free love (if our wives don't find out), a sound dollar, and a strong military with spiffy uniforms. There are thousands of people in America who feel this way, especially after three or four drinks. If all of us would unite and work together, we could give this country. . . well, a real bad hangover."

The collection includes the article "How to Drive Fast on Drugs While Getting Your Wing-Wang Squeezed and Not Spill Your Drink" which had previously been published in National Lampoon in 1979, and was later included in the collection Driving Like Crazy.

The essay is the inspiration and namesake of the 1991 Big Country song.
