= Eclectic (Big Country album) =

Live album by Big Country
- Released: 5 August 1996
- Length: 49:45
- Label: Transatlantic Records
- Producer: Big Country, Gary Langan

Big Country chronology
Why the Long Face (1995)	Eclectic (1996)	Driving to Damascus (1999)

Eclectic is a live album by the Scottish rock band Big Country, released in 1996 by Castle Communications. It was produced by Big Country and Gary Langan, and reached No. 41 in the UK. In 2001, a video version of Eclectic was released under the same name by Castle.

Eclectic was recorded at Dingwalls in London on 20–21 March 1996 and features guest appearances by Bobby Valentino, Kym Mazelle, Carol Laula, Steve Harley, Aaron Emerson, Hossam Ramzy (and his percussion section) and Mohammed Toufiq.

== Critical reception ==
Professional ratings
Review scores
Source	Rating
AllMusic	4/5 stars
The Virgin Encyclopedia of Eighties Music	3/4 stars

On its release, Aaron Badgley of AllMusic described Eclectic as a "terrific album", "interesting due to the choice of songs" and full of "great songs, played very well". He concluded, "While fans of Big Country will love this collection, it has a wide appeal to music fans in general."

== Track listing ==
No.	Title	Writer(s)	Length
1.	"River of Hope"	Stuart Adamson	4:06
2.	"King of Emotion"	Adamson	4:10
3.	"Big Yellow Taxi"	Joni Mitchell	3:50
4.	"The Buffalo Skinners"	Adamson, Bruce Watson	5:58
5.	"Summertime"	George Gershwin, DuBose Heyward, Ira Gershwin	3:57
6.	"The Night They Drove Old Dixie Down"	Robbie Robertson	3:44
7.	"Eleanor Rigby"	John Lennon, Paul McCartney	3:47
8.	"Winter Sky"	Adamson, Watson	4:06
9.	"Sling It"	Steve Harley	3:04
10.	"I'm on Fire"	Bruce Springsteen	2:39
11.	"Where the Rose Is Sown"	Adamson, Mark Brzezicki, Tony Butler, Watson	4:10
12.	"Come Back to Me"	Adamson, Brzezicki, Butler, Watson	4:43
13.	"Ruby Tuesday"	Mick Jagger, Keith Richards	4:14

== Personnel ==
Big Country

- Stuart Adamson - lead vocals, acoustic guitar
- Bruce Watson - acoustic guitar, mandolin
- Tony Butler - acoustic bass, backing vocals
- Mark Brzezicki - drums, backing vocals

Guest musicians

- Hossam Ramzy (The Hossam Ramzy Percussion Section), Mohammed Toufiq - percussion (tracks 1, 3, 7, 9, 11–12)
- Bobby Valentino - violin (all tracks)
- Kym Mazelle - guest vocalist (tracks 2, 5)
- Carol Laula - guest vocalist (track 3)
- Steve Harley - guest vocalist (track 9)
- Aaron Emerson - keyboards (tracks 2, 4–6, 8, 12–13)

Production

- Big Country - producers
- Gary Langan - producer, recorded by
- Alan Morrison - live sound

Other

- Zarkowski Designs - design
- Justin Thomas - booklet photography
- Hugh Gilmour - front and back cover design and photography
- Ian Grant Management - management
