= Holidays in Heck =

- Author: P. J. ORourke
- Language: English
- Publisher: Atlantic Monthly Press
- Publication date: 2011
- Publication place: United States
- ISBN: 978-0-8021-1985-8

Holidays in Heck: A Former War Correspondent Experiences Frightening Vacation Fun is a 2011 book by P. J. O'Rourke about the author's travels to various venues.

In the book, O'Rourke recounts family vacations to various tourist destinations, such as the Field Museum of Natural History in Chicago and the Galápagos Islands. It is loosely modeled after his earlier book Holidays in Hell.

In the introduction, O'Rourke states, "[After my experiences as a war correspondent] I decided to write about pleasant places. ... I'd always been where people were shooting each other ... How, I wondered, does one undertake enjoyably going somewhere enjoyable?"
