= Eat the rich =

Leftist slogan attributed to Jean-Jacques Rousseau

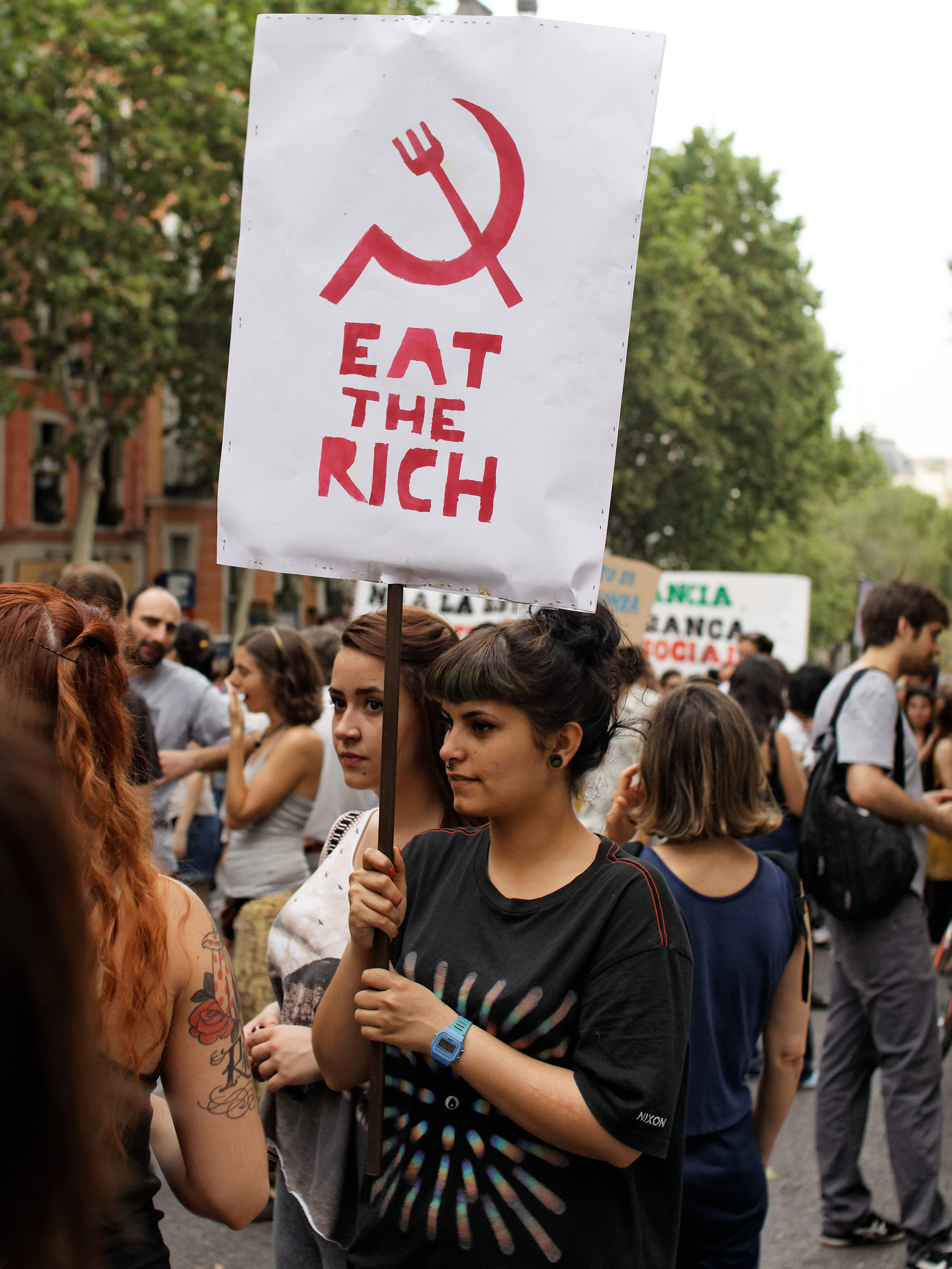
Woman with slogan and a hammer and sickle symbol with a fork instead of a hammer (Madrid, 2012)

"Eat the rich" is a political slogan associated with anti-capitalism and left-wing politics. The phrase is commonly attributed to political philosopher Jean-Jacques Rousseau, from a quote first popularized during the French Revolution: "When the people shall have nothing more to eat, they will eat the rich".

It may variously be used as a metaphor for class conflict or a demand for wealth redistribution, and thus often finds usage in socialist and progressive politics.

== History ==
=== Origin ===
Pierre Gaspard Chaumette, President of the Paris Commune, gave a speech to the city during the Reign of Terror on 14 October 1793 in which he apocryphally said:

Rousseau faisait partie du peuple aussi, et il disait: 'Quand le peuple n'aura plus rien à manger, il mangera le riche.'

Rousseau, who was also one of the people, said: 'When the people shall have nothing more to eat, they will eat the rich.'

The phrase was initially a criticism of the French nobility, but it was later popularized in France as a response to the perceived failures of the French Revolution that perpetuated poverty in the country.

=== Modern usage ===
The phrase has been linked to episodes of actual political cannibalism that took place during China's Cultural Revolution. Mao Zedong's Selected Works includes the phrase "eat up powerful families", as a figure of speech referring to peasants attacking or seizing landlords' property. Historian Donald S. Sutton has pointed out that the phrase became literal during the events in Wuxuan in 1968, where wealthy people and landlords were killed and eaten.

In the 21st century, the phrase is used in response to the increasing wealth inequality and food insecurity. In the United States, the phrase was used by the crowd at a rally for progressive Democratic candidate Elizabeth Warren in 2019 in approval of Warren's positions on wealth redistribution, including her position on the wealth tax.

In South Africa, the phrase "eat the rich" was used by the Land Party as its campaign slogan for the 2021 local government elections.

The phrase has trended on major social networks online. It became prominent on TikTok around 2019, with users posting videos critical of the rich. Many of these videos also targeted more mundane "first-world" behavior, directing the phrase toward people who study abroad, pay for a Spotify subscription, or have a second refrigerator. In many cases, these videos were produced to demonstrate hypocrisy of those who use the phrase while enjoying the comforts of a first world society. Usage of the phrase was noted to have increased following the COVID-19 lockdowns in 2020.

In 2022, Amazon union leader Christian Smalls wore a jacket which said 'Eat the Rich' to the White House when he met President Joe Biden.

In 2023, American United Auto Workers president Shawn Fain adopted the phrase for GM, Ford, and Stellantis employees' fight for increased wages and benefits in Detroit.

== In popular culture ==
The phrase has been used for the title of a 1987 film and a song for the film by Motörhead. It was also the title of a 1993 song by Aerosmith. The book Eat the Rich was published by P. J. O'Rourke in 1998. The comic series Eat the Rich debuted in 2021.

Season four (2023) of the TV show You features an "Eat the Rich" killer.

In 2023, Netflix released a docuseries entitled Eat the Rich: The GameStop Saga, which detailed the GameStop short squeeze.

Eat the Rich was the theme for a retrospective exhibition at the 2024 Neuchâtel International Fantastic Film Festival.

Many films have been described as "eat the rich movies". This theme was particularly notable in 2019 with the releases of films such as Joker, Parasite, Knives Out, and Ready or Not and in 2022 with the releases of Triangle of Sadness, The Menu, and Glass Onion: A Knives Out Mystery.

== See also ==
- No War but the Class War
- Matthew effect
- Let them eat cake
