= No Place Like Home (Big Country album) =

Studio album by Big Country
- Released: 16 September 1991
- Recorded: February–June 1991
- Studios: Rockfield (Rockfield, Wales)
- Genre: Alternative rock
- Length: 73:22
- Label: Vertigo (UK)
- Producer: Pat Moran

Big Country chronology
| Through a Big Country: Greatest Hits (1990) | No Place Like Home (1991) | The Buffalo Skinners (1993) |

Singles from No Place Like Home
- 1. "Republican Party Reptile" Released: August 1991; 2. "Beautiful People" Released: October 1991

No Place Like Home is the fifth studio album by Scottish band Big Country, released in September 1991. Its title derives from a quote in The Wonderful Wizard of Oz, which is referenced by the first track, "We're Not in Kansas". Dorothy's statement was in turn taken from the famous poem and song Home! Sweet Home! by John Howard Payne and Henry Bishop.

== Critical reception ==
Professional ratings
Review scores
| Source | Rating |
|---|---|
| AllMusic | 2/5 stars |

Upon its release, Simon Dudfield of NME noted the band's transition from their "straight rock" and "old Scottish growl" to "a more traditional R&B feel". He concluded, "By returning to a form of music they truly love, Big Country have made a commendable step in the right direction; a bright start to their decade." Caren Myers of Melody Maker was critical of the album and concluded there is "no place like the bin". She described Big Country as a band that "makes Lime Spiders look like The Rolling Stones" and Adamson as a "Celtic Springsteen wannabe". She felt the album was made up of a "series of insufferable bar-room boogies" and added, "This, we are told, is Big Country getting back to basics, their R&B roots. Naturally, all sentient listeners will wish they wouldn't, but who listens to us anyway?"

== Track listing ==
All tracks are written by Stuart Adamson; except where noted.

| No. | Title | Writer(s) | Length |
|---|---|---|---|
| 1. | "We're Not in Kansas" | | 6:12 |
| 2. | "Republican Party Reptile" | Adamson, Bruce Watson | 4:02 |
| 3. | "Dynamite Lady" | | 5:35 |
| 4. | "Keep on Dreaming" | | 4:00 |
| 5. | "Beautiful People" | | 5:33 |
| 6. | "The Hostage Speaks" | Adamson, Tony Butler, Watson | 5:52 |
| 7. | "Beat the Devil" | | 4:04 |
| 8. | "Leap of Faith" | | 5:44 |
| 9. | "You, Me and the Truth" | | 5:19 |
| 10. | "Comes a Time" | | 3:54 |
| 11. | "Ships" | Adamson, Watson | 4:01 |
| 12. | "Into the Fire" | Adamson, Butler, Watson | 5:53 |

1996 remastered reissue bonus tracks
| No. | Title | Length |
|---|---|---|
| 13. | "Heart of the World" | 3:45 |
| 14. | "Kiss the Girl Goodbye" | 5:12 |
| 15. | "Freedom Song" | 4:32 |

"You, Me and the Truth" and "Comes a Time" were bonus tracks on the CD and cassette releases of the album; they were not on the original vinyl release. The 2014 deluxe edition of the album restores the vinyl running order and moves these tracks to a bonus disc.

== Personnel ==
Big Country

- Stuart Adamson – guitar, vocals
- Tony Butler – bass, vocals
- Bruce Watson – guitar, mandolin

Additional musicians

- Pat Ahern – drums on "Freedom Song"
- Mark Brzezicki – drums, percussion
- Richie Close – piano, programming
- Katie Kissoon – additional vocals
- Carol Kenyon – additional vocals

== Charts ==
| Chart (1991) | Peak position |
|---|---|
| UK Albums Chart | 28 |
