= Why the Long Face (album) =

Studio album by Big Country
- Released: 12 June 1995
- Recorded: November 1994 – March 1995
- Genres: Alternative rock, celtic rock
- Labels: Transatlantic (UK); Pure (US)
- Producers: Big Country and Chris Sheldon

Big Country chronology
The Buffalo Skinners (1993)	Why the Long Face (1995)	Eclectic (1996)

Singles from Why the Long Face
- 1. "I'm Not Ashamed" Released: 30 May 1995; 2. "You Dreamer" Released: 21 August 1995

Why the Long Face is the seventh studio album by Scottish band Big Country, released in June 1995. It was produced by Chris Sheldon and members of the band.

The album received a reissue as a deluxe four-disc box-set by Cherry Red Records in 2018. In addition to a remaster of the original album on disc one, the three additional CDs contain demos, B-sides and single edits, as well as the band's 1996 live album Eclectic.

== Background ==
Why the Long Face was recorded between August 1994 and January 1995. The new material was met with a lukewarm response from the head of the band's label Compulsion, Chris Briggs, who felt the band needed to do more work on the material. Compulsion ended up dropping Big Country and the band subsequently signed to Transatlantic in March 1995, with Why the Long Face being released on the label in June 1995.

Speaking to The Lennox Herald in 1995, lead vocalist and guitarist Stuart Adamson said of the album, "I think that this album flows well and that there is no filler on it. It's strong enough for us to do most of it live on stage." He added to the Evening Herald, "It's not a departure from or a return to anything really. This time round though, I think the songs are more intimate and personal as opposed to being about big impersonal issues. They've got real characters, strong verses and choruses."

== Critical reception ==
Professional ratings
Review scores
Source	Rating
AllMusic	2/5 stars
NME	1/10

On its release, Neil McKay of Sunday Life felt Why the Long Face failed to meet the same standard as The Buffalo Skinners. He wrote, "Solid and workmanlike, it lacks real inspiration. 'Sail into Nothing', 'God's Great Mistake', 'Wildland in My Heart' and 'Blue on a Green Planet' all try hard, but diminishing returns seem to be setting in." Chris Heath of The Daily Telegraph described the album as "rather good" and noted, "It was with minimal interest that I put on their new album, and with astonishment that I heard tune after tune of the sort which, if they had released them in 1987, would have saved their career." Mark Beaumont of NME was highly negative of the album, calling it "turgid bargain-bin fodder", with "a cesspool full of anonymous squidge-rawkers", "slabs of immense blandness", "a huge dollop of Huey Lewis" and lyrics "that have all the subtlety of Vinnie Jones".

== Track listing ==
=== Original release (1995) ===
All tracks are written by Stuart Adamson; except where noted.

No.	Title	Writer(s)	Length
1.	"You Dreamer"		4:50
2.	"Message of Love"		4:05
3.	"I'm Not Ashamed"		4:13
4.	"Sail into Nothing"		3:47
5.	"Thunder & Lightning"		3:38
6.	"Send You"		4:11
7.	"One in a Million"		5:05
8.	"God's Great Mistake"	Adamson, Tony Butler	4:48
9.	"Wildland in My Heart"		4:04
10.	"Take You to the Moon"		4:55
11.	"Far from Me to You"		4:11
12.	"Charlotte"	Adamson, Bruce Watson	3:54
13.	"Post Nuclear Talking Blues"	Adamson, Butler, Watson, Mark Brzezicki	3:21
14.	"Blue on a Green Planet"	Adamson, Butler, Watson, Brzezicki	4:52

US CD release bonus tracks
No.	Title	Writer(s)	Length
15.	"Vicious"	Lou Reed	3:14
16.	"In a Big Country" (Unplugged Version)	Adamson, Brzezicki, Butler, Watson	3:13

Japan 1996 CD release bonus tracks
No.	Title	Writer(s)	Length
15.	"In a Big Country" (Acoustic Version)		3:13
16.	"All Go Together" (Acoustic Version)	Adamson, Watson	3:21

=== Cherry Red deluxe edition (2018) ===
==== Disc One – Why the Long Face ====
No.	Title	Length
1.	"You Dreamer"	4:50
2.	"Message of Love"	4:06
3.	"I'm Not Ashamed"	4:13
4.	"Sail into Nothing"	3:47
5.	"Thunder & Lightning"	3:38
6.	"Send You"	4:12
7.	"One in a Million"	5:05
8.	"God's Great Mistake"	4:48
9.	"Wildland in My Heart"	4:04
10.	"Take You to the Moon"	4:55
11.	"Far from Me to You"	4:11
12.	"Charlotte"	3:54
13.	"Post Nuclear Talking Blues"	3:21
14.	"Blue on a Green Planet"	4:54

==== Disc Two – Bonus Tracks ====
All tracks are written by Stuart Adamson; except where noted.

No.	Title	Writer(s)	Length
1.	"I'm Not Ashamed" (Single Edit)		3:46
2.	"One in a Million" (1st Visit)		5:21
3.	"Monday Tuesday Girl"	Adamson, Brzezicki, Watson	3:56
4.	"In a Big Country" (Acoustic Version)	Adamson, Brzezicki, Butler, Watson	3:16
5.	"Crazytimes"		4:05
6.	"Blue on a Green Planet" (Cool Version)	Adamson, Butler, Watson, Brzezicki	4:40
7.	"You Dreamer" (Single Edit)		3:39
8.	"Ice Cream Smile"		3:54
9.	"Magic in Your Eyes"		2:59
10.	"Bianca"	Adamson, Butler	4:41
11.	"Hardly a Mountain" (HITW Tapes)		3:58
12.	"Golden Boy Loves Golden Girl" (HITW Tapes)		4:39
13.	"Can You Feel the Winter" (HITW Tapes)		6:36
14.	"I'm Eighteen"	Alice Cooper, Michael Bruce, Glen Buxton, Dennis Dunaway, Neal Smith	2:55
15.	"Vicious"	Lou Reed	3:15
16.	"On the Road Again"	Floyd Jones, Alan Wilson	4:22
17.	"All Go Together"	Adamson, Watson	3:21

==== Disc Three – Eclectic ====
No.	Title	Writer(s)	Length
1.	"River of Hope"	Adamson	4:06
2.	"King of Emotion"	Adamson	4:10
3.	"Big Yellow Taxi"	Joni Mitchell	3:50
4.	"The Buffalo Skinners"	Adamson, Watson	5:58
5.	"Summertime"	George Gershwin, DuBose Heyward, Ira Gershwin	3:57
6.	"The Night They Drove Old Dixie Down"	Robbie Robertson	3:44
7.	"Eleanor Rigby"	John Lennon, Paul McCartney	3:47
8.	"Winter Sky"	Adamson, Watson	4:06
9.	"Sling It"	Steve Harley	3:04
10.	"I'm on Fire"	Bruce Springsteen	2:39
11.	"Where the Rose Is Sown"	Adamson, Brzezicki, Butler, Watson	4:10
12.	"Come Back to Me"	Adamson, Brzezicki, Butler, Watson	4:43
13.	"Ruby Tuesday"	Mick Jagger, Keith Richards	4:16
14.	"Teenage Lament" (Bonus Track)	Cooper, Smith	3:54
15.	"Down on the Corner" (Bonus Track)	John Fogerty	2:49
16.	"Hey Hey My My" (Bonus Track)	Neil Young	5:04
17.	"You Dreamer" (Bonus Track - Acoustic Version)		4:09
18.	"I'm Not Ashamed" (Bonus Track - Acoustic Version)		3:46

==== Disc Four – Demos ====
All tracks are written by Stuart Adamson; except where noted.

No.	Title	Writer(s)	Length
1.	"You Dreamer" (Demo)		4:45
2.	"Message of Love" (Demo)		3:40
3.	"I'm Not Ashamed" (Demo)		4:41
4.	"Sail into Nothing" (Demo)		4:31
5.	"Thunder and Lightning" (Demo)		4:01
6.	"Send You" (Demo)		5:17
7.	"God's Great Mistake" (Demo)	Adamson, Butler	5:53
8.	"Wildland in My Heart" (Demo)		4:03
9.	"Take You to the Moon" (Demo)		4:41
10.	"Far from Me to You" (Demo)		4:27
11.	"Charlotte" (Demo)	Adamson, Watson	4:03
12.	"Post Nuclear Talking Blues" (Demo)	Adamson, Butler, Watson, Brzezicki	2:59
13.	"Crazytimes" (Demo)		4:34
14.	"What About Peace" (Demo)		3:30
15.	"Normal" (Demo)	Adamson, Watson	2:25
16.	"God's Great Mistake" (Alternate Version)	Adamson, Butler	3:11

== Charts ==
Chart (1995)	Peak position
Scottish Albums (Official Charts)	28
UK Albums (Official Charts)	48

Chart (2018)	Peak position
Scottish Albums (Official Charts)	46

Chart (2024)	Peak position
Scottish Albums (Official Charts)	24

== Personnel ==
- Stuart Adamson - guitar, e-bow, slide guitar, B-Bender guitar, lead vocals
- Mark Brzezicki - drums, percussion, backing vocals
- Tony Butler - bass guitar, backing vocals
- Bruce Watson - guitar, e-bow, mandolin

Additional personnel

- Josh Phillips - keyboards
- James McNally - low whistle on "God's Great Mistake"
