= The One I Love (Big Country song) =

Single by Big Country

from the album The Buffalo Skinners
- Released: 24 May 1993
- Recorded: 1992
- Length: 4:00 (edit); 5:03 (album version)
- Label: Fox Records
- Songwriters: Stuart Adamson; Bruce Watson
- Producer: Big Country

Big Country singles chronology
"Ships (Where Were You)" (1993)	"The One I Love" (1993)	"I'm Not Ashamed" (1995)

"The One I Love" is a song by Scottish rock band Big Country, released in May 1993 as the third and final single from their sixth studio album, The Buffalo Skinners. It was written by Stuart Adamson and Bruce Watson, and was produced by Big Country.

"The One I Love" was released in the United States only, although a potential UK and European release was also considered at the time. The song generated airplay on rock radio in the States and reached number 17 on the Billboard Modern Rock Tracks and number 34 on the Billboard Album Rock Tracks charts.

== Background ==
In 2004, guitarist Bruce Watson recalled of the song, "It was originally demoed in my home studio in Charlestown. It was a case of me having the intro and the verse worked out and Stuart having the chorus and the middle 8 worked out. A lot of Big Country songs were bolted together and this song is a prime example." Bassist Tony Butler said in 2006 that the song "should have been a massive hit".

== Critical reception ==
Upon its release, Larry Flick of Billboard described the song as an "urgent, anthemic ditty" which "marks a welcome and surprisingly potent return for the band". He added, "Adamson's voice is in top shape, and the production is forceful without flying over the edge into melodrama." In a review of The Buffalo Skinners, Kim DeFalco of The Tampa Tribune commented, "Adamson burrows into his own psyche for moody, bluesy songs of alienation such as 'The One I Love'." Dick Hogan of The Gazette wrote, "It opens with a mellow touch before breaking into layered guitars and features a catchy, multi-track sing-along hook."

Roberto Gonzalez of the Hartford Courant considered the song "undeniably catchy" but reminiscent of the band's 1983 hit "In a Big Country". John Everson of the Southtown Star commented, "Singles like 'Alone' and 'The One I Love' should have no trouble finding an FM home". Johnny Loftus of AllMusic noted that the "strength of 'Seven Waves' and 'One I Love''s choruses is so pure and honest, it's hard not to get butterflies in the bridge".

== Track listing ==
Cassette single

1. "The One I Love" – 5:03
2. "The Selling of America" – 4:20

CD single (promo)

1. "The One I Love" (Edit) – 4:00
2. "The One I Love" (Remix) – 4:03
3. "The One I Love" (Album Version) – 5:03

== Personnel ==
Big Country

- Stuart Adamson – vocals, guitar
- Bruce Watson – guitar
- Tony Butler – bass, backing vocals

Additional musicians

- Simon Phillips – drums

Production

- Big Country – production
- Dave Bascombe – mixing
- Chris Sheldon – recording
- George Marino – mastering
- Dave Thoener – remix, edits
- Mark Eichner – edits

Other

- Amy Wenzler – design
- Jacqueline Murphy – art direction

== Charts ==
Chart (1993)	Peak position
US Billboard Album Rock Tracks	34
US Billboard Modern Rock Tracks	17
