= I'm Not Ashamed (Big Country song) =

Single by Big Country

from the album Why the Long Face
- Released: 30 May 1995
- Length: 4:12 (album version); 3:44 (single version)
- Label: Transatlantic
- Songwriter: Stuart Adamson
- Producers: Big Country; Chris Sheldon

Big Country singles chronology
| "The One I Love" (1993) | "I'm Not Ashamed" (1995) | "You Dreamer" (1995) |

"I'm Not Ashamed" is a song by Scottish rock band Big Country, released in 1995 as the lead single from their seventh studio album Why the Long Face. It was written by Stuart Adamson, and produced by Big Country and Chris Sheldon. "I'm Not Ashamed" reached number 69 in the UK Singles Chart.

== Background ==
Speaking to the Weekly Post & Free Press Recorder in 1995, Adamson said of the song's lyrics, "Lyrics come to you at the most bizarre times. I was out for a run in Lincolnshire, and all of a sudden I'd got this lyric. I ran back to the studio where we were recording and wrote the entire lyric for 'I'm Not Ashamed'."

In 2006, bassist Tony Butler described "I'm Not Ashamed" as a "great anthemic track" and added, "I always felt that the lyrics were too sophisticated to be a single, but it does have some of my favourite chord progressions in the intro section."

== Release ==
"I'm Not Ashamed" was released by Transatlantic on 30 May 1995 in the UK only. The single's release date was postponed a number of times. Approximately 2,000 copies reached the shops a week before the finalised 30 May release date due to an administrative error and this resulted in the first week of sales not counting towards the chart position. It also resulted in both editions of the CD single being released at the same time, rather than one a week after the other. Upon its release, "I'm Not Ashamed" received limited airplay on national radio but was more successful in generating plays on regional stations.

== Music video ==
The song's music video was directed by Desmond Webb and produced by Marc Wilkinson for Frontline Films.

== Critical reception ==
Upon its release as a single, The Dumfries and Galloway Standard described "I'm Not Ashamed" as "typically Stuart Adamson" and added, "It's big on guitars, chorus and heart, but you can't help feeling that it's also behind the times. Nevertheless, a listenable blast from the past for the band's original and now aging fans." Simon Williams of NME was negative in his review, calling it a "glutinous slab of life's-what-you-make-it cod philosophy".

In a review of Why the Long Face, Jerry Ewing of Metal Hammer wrote, "Why the Long Face is all muscular riffs, rock solid rhythms and singalong chorus[es]. The opening salvo of 'You Dreamer', 'Message of Love' and 'I'm Not Ashamed' set out the band's agenda perfectly; rousing hard rock in the finest British tradition that remains evergreen and peerless." Allan Glen, in his 2011 book Stuart Adamson: In a Big Country, considered the song "lyrically very dark and introspective" which was "completely at odds with the British music press" who were "preoccupied with the loud, brash and life-affirming sounds of Britpop".

In a review of the 2018 deluxe edition of Why the Long Face, the Hartlepool Mail described both "I'm Not Ashamed" and its follow-up "You Dreamer" as being "the equal of most of [the band's] more celebrated back catalogue, but made little impact [at the time]". Peter Roche of AXS noted the song's "reflections on personal triumphs and private travails". John Bergstrom of PopMatters considered it to be a "chunky rock number" on which the band "come across like Living Colour".

== Track listing ==
Cassette and CD single

1. "I'm Not Ashamed" (Single Edit) – 3:44
2. "One in a Million" (1st Visit) – 5:20
3. "Monday Tuesday Girl" – 3:55
4. "I'm Not Ashamed" (Full Version) – 4:12

CD single #2

1. "I'm Not Ashamed" (Single Edit) – 3:44
2. "Crazytimes" – 4:05
3. "Big Country" – 3:16
4. "Blue on a Green Planet" (Cool Version) – 4:40

== Personnel ==
Big Country

- Stuart Adamson – vocals, guitar
- Bruce Watson – guitar
- Tony Butler – bass, backing vocals
- Mark Brzezicki – drums, percussion, backing vocals

Production

- Chris Sheldon – producer on "I'm Not Ashamed", mixing and engineer
- Big Country – producers (all tracks)
- Graham Stewart – assistant engineer
- George Marino – mastering

== Charts ==
| Chart (1995) | Peak position |
|---|---|
| UK Singles Chart | 69 |
