= Parliament of Whores =

Political humor book by P.J. O'Rourke

- First edition
- Author: P. J. O'Rourke
- Language: English
- Subject: Political satire
- Publisher: Atlantic Monthly Press
- Publication date: May 1991
- Publication place: United States
- Media type: Print (hardcover)
- Pages: 233pp. (first edition)
- ISBN: 0-871-13455-1
- OCLC: 23179636
- Dewey Decimal: 320.973/0207
- LC Class: JK34.O74 1991

Parliament of Whores: A Lone Humorist Attempts to Explain the Entire U.S. Government is an international best-selling political humor book by P. J. O'Rourke published by Atlantic Monthly Press in 1991. It is a scathing critique of the American system of governance from a libertarian perspective. The hard cover version was a #1 New York Times bestseller, sold over 150,000 copies in its first two months of release, and earned over $1 million in revenue in the same time period. Parliament reached the top 5 on Canadian best seller lists. The paperback release in 1992 was a similar commercial success.

The book received an overwhelmingly positive critical reception. Time Magazine called it "a riotously funny and perceptive indictment of America's political system". The New York Times called it "a funnily savage attack on the political authorities of the United States". In a piece about its 1992 paperback release, USA Today described it as "the anthem of this political year".
