= National Lampoon Sunday Newspaper Parody =

American humor book

- First edition (1978)
- Author: P. J. O'Rourke and John Hughes
- Language: English
- Genre: Comedy, parody
- Publisher: National Lampoon
- Publication date: Jan 1978, reissued as a book in 2004
- Publication place: United States
- Media type: Print
- Pages: 208 (when in book form)
- ISBN: 978-1-59071-037-1

National Lampoon Sunday Newspaper Parody is an American humor "book", a parody that was first published in 1978 by National Lampoon magazine. In the first printing, this publication had exactly the same form and apparent content as that of an American regional Sunday newspaper, of which it was a parody. In many ways a sequel to the National Lampoon 1964 High School Yearbook Parody, published in 1973, the authors of the piece were P. J. O'Rourke and John Hughes.

== Publication history and physical format ==
O'Rourke, a National Lampoon editor, conceived the idea for an eight-section newspaper parody on New Year's Day in 1975 while he was snowed in at Lincoln, Nebraska. Stranded with his aunt and his cousin, O'Rourke found himself contemplating local newspaper stories and ads amidst the downtime between football games. Rather than pursuing distractions, O'Rourke meticulously listed various types of stories and advertisements found in the Lincoln and Omaha newspapers, aiming to create a parody using real journalists. Progress was made when the publisher of Newsday in Long Island, arranged a meeting; Newsday managing editor Lou Schwartz emphasized the importance of local hooks in journalism, advising that localized angles drive readership, which informed the parody's approach.

The National Lampoon Sunday Newspaper Parody was released in early January 1978, with the newspaper bearing the date of "Feb. 12, 1978." Like a real Sunday newspaper of that period, it was originally printed in many different sections, some on the paper stock known as newsprint, and some on other cheap paper.

The (originally separate) sections within the newspaper included: National News, Local News, More Local News, Sports Section, Entertainment, Television Listings, Travel, Real Estate, Gardening, Your Pet, Women's Pages, Classified Ads, a "Swillmart Discount Store" Advertising Supplement, a Parade magazine parody, and eight pages of comics.

The Newspaper Parody was reissued, but in book form, in 2004.

== Dacron, Ohio ==
The newspaper's name is the "Dacron, Ohio Republican–Democrat", with the fictional town of "Dacron" being a three-part reference to Akron, Ohio; (Note: Akron, Ohio, is the metropolitan area nearest Sandusky, Ohio — setting of The King of Sandusky, a fictionalized account of O'Rourke's childhood.) Dayton, Ohio; and to the cheap polyester fabric Dacron. Use of the imaginary city "Dacron, Ohio" links the Newspaper Parody to the National Lampoon 1964 High School Yearbook Parody because "C. Estes Kefauver High School" was supposedly situated in the same city.

In the newspaper, Dacron is described as "The Motor Home Capital of the World". However, many of the street and location names in the parody actually reference Toledo, Ohio, which was O'Rourke's hometown.

== Contents ==
As described by writer Ellin Stein, "the parody succeeds in creating its own universe through an accumulation of interrelated detail.... [f]rom the classifieds to the obituaries to the movie ads":

The big headline of the Republican-Democrat refers to yet another attack by a notorious local criminal, the Powder Room Prowler, a menace still at large after several months despite his trademark high heels and bag over his head. This local story is given far more attention than such minor (and faraway) events like “30,000 Feared Dead in India” and “Japan Destroyed” (which receives a bit more play because the tragedy “has marred the vacation plans of Miss Frances Bundle and her mother, Olive”).

The parody also brought readers up to date with characters featured in the National Lampoon 1964 High School Yearbook Parody (who were now almost 15 years older):

Rich kid Woolworth Van Husen III is, unsurprisingly, in the family trailer business, while artistic Forrest Swisher is director of the “Dinner Theater in the Dell.” Elsewhere we learn that lone African-American student Madison Avenue Jones is a city councilman, class clown Herb Weisenheimer is now proprietor of “Hollerin’ Herb’s Psychopathic Chevrolet and Lunatic Used Cars,” and former beatnik and Dickinson grad Faun Rosenberg heads up a conservation group that is trying to stop hunters from shooting the wildlife that flocks to the warm (160 degrees centigrade) waters of the Lake Muskingum nuclear cooling pond. Meanwhile, Everystudent Larry Kroger, now a Kefauver High guidance counselor, has attempted suicide by jumping from the second story of his parents’ home.

(Kroger, of course, is the college freshman protagonist, played by Tom Hulce, of the comedy movie National Lampoon's Animal House, released in late July 1978, some months after the newspaper parody.)
