= Save Me (Big Country song) =

Single by Big Country

from the album Through a Big Country: Greatest Hits
- B-side: "Pass Me By"
- Released: 30 April 1990
- Length: 5:34
- Label: Mercury
- Songwriter(s): Stuart Adamson
- Producer(s): Tim Palmer

Big Country singles chronology
"Peace in Our Time" (1989)	"Save Me" (1990)	"Heart of the World" (1990)

"Save Me" is a song by Scottish rock band Big Country, released in 1990 as a single from their compilation album Through a Big Country: Greatest Hits. The song was written by Stuart Adamson and produced by Tim Palmer. It reached number 41 in the UK Singles Chart and remained in the top 100 for three weeks.

== Background ==
During March 1990, Big Country spent time recording two new songs, "Save Me" and "Heart of the World" at Livingston Studios in London. The tracks that would emerge as B-sides on the singles were recorded at Chipping Norton Studios in Oxford during the same month. With drummer Mark Brzezicki's departure from the band in 1989, the sessions featured Pat Ahern on drums. "Save Me" was selected as the first song to be released as a single, preceding "Heart of the World", which followed in July. Although the band had wanted "Heart of the World" to be released first, the band's label, Mercury, opted for "Save Me" instead.

"Save Me" was released in April 1990 in the UK, a month before the band's compilation Through a Big Country: Greatest Hits, which the song would also appear on. It was released in May in Europe. Met with a lack of airplay on BBC Radio 1, the song stalled at number 41 in the UK Singles Chart. Speaking to the We Save No Souls! fanzine in 1991, Adamson said of the song's limited chart success, "I know for a fact that if it had been played on Radio 1 it would have been a hit. I'm positive, 'cause everybody I know and people who don't even like the band who heard the single, liked it. 'Save Me' was very much sort of "old-style" Big Country."

Speaking of the song, Adamson told Mojo in 1990, "'Save Me' actually just came from a load of jamming. It's a lot more bluesy than anything I've come up with before and I wanted to make it a quasi-spiritual song. Working with Tim Palmer on that was really enjoyable after general dissatisfaction that we felt working with Peter Wolf on the last album. We'd like Tim to work with us on the next album if he's got time."

== Promotion ==
The song's music video was directed by Howard Greenhalgh and shot in London on 24 April 1990. On 17 May, Adamson and Bruce Watson would perform an acoustic version of the song on the James Whale Show. The band also performed the song on the variety show Cannon and Ball's Casino, which was broadcast on 19 May.

== Critical reception ==
Upon its release as a single, Peter Kinghorn of the Newcastle Evening Chronicle noted that "the big rocking sound is different, but still recognisably them". Pan-European magazine Music & Media wrote, "Gone are the E-bow guitars, the traditional Celtic melodies, and the 'grandeur' of the old Big Country sound. What is left is a straightforward rock song, which seems to be aimed at the US market." Marcus Hodge of the Cambridge Evening News gave a mixed review, describing the lyrics as "dire", but adding that the "bright chorus bobs along with spirit". He also noted that the "lead guitar bits sound less like bagpipes than ever before".

Iestyn George of Record Mirror was negative in his review, writing, "The word 'rousing' was invented so that there would be a suitable description for Big Country's music. Clichéd, overblown and unimaginative also spring to mind, and 'Save Me' kicks off with a dreadful guitar solo from which Adamson leads us on an unremarkable voyage to tedium and back." Jon Wilde of Melody Maker was also critical, describing the song as "yet another clod-hopping anthem, scraped off the sides of what must now be a very worn toilet-bowl". David Owens of the South Wales Echo awarded the song two out of five stars, calling it "typical formulised Big Country" and adding, "Adamson's yelping vocals and celtic chords do all the work to patch up an adequate song without much of the fire and spirit of past efforts." Paul Coffey of the Nottingham Evening Post also gave a two star rating and described the song as "just like the others – 'Look Away' with different lyrics".

== Track listing ==
7-inch and cassette single

1. "Save Me" – 4:28
2. "Pass Me By" – 3:58

12-inch single

1. "Save Me" – 5:27
2. "Pass Me By" – 3:56
3. "Dead on Arrival" – 3:26

12-inch single (UK limited edition)

1. "Save Me" – 5:29
2. "Wonderland" (Live) – 5:59
3. "Thousand Yard Stare" (Live) – 4:49

CD single

1. "Save Me" – 5:34
2. "Pass Me By" – 4:03
3. "World on Fire" – 3:49

== Personnel ==
Big Country

- Stuart Adamson – vocals, guitar
- Bruce Watson – guitar
- Tony Butler – bass
- Pat Ahern – drums

Production

- Tim Palmer – producer of "Save Me"
- Big Country – producers of "Pass Me By", "Dead on Arrival" and "World on Fire"
- Pounda – mastering

== Charts ==
Chart (1990)	Peak position
UK Singles Chart	41
