= The Buffalo Skinners =

Studio album by Big Country
- Released: 22 March 1993
- Recorded: August–December 1992
- Genres: Alternative rock, Celtic rock
- Length: 59:45
- Labels: Compulsion; Fox (US)
- Producer: Big Country

Big Country chronology
No Place Like Home (1991)	The Buffalo Skinners (1993)	Why the Long Face (1995)

Singles from The Buffalo Skinners
- 1. "Alone" Released: 1 March 1993; 2. "Ships (Where Were You)" Released: 19 April 1993; 3. "The One I Love" Released: 24 May 1993

The Buffalo Skinners is the sixth studio album by the Scottish band Big Country, which was released in March 1993. Two songs, "We're Not In Kansas" and "Ships", are re-recordings of songs from their previous album. The difference is more noticeable on "Ships" which features heavy use of guitars (in contrast to the guitar-free 1991 version). The album featured two UK top 30 hits, "Alone" (No. 24) and "Ships" (No. 29).

In 2020, Cherry Red Records released a deluxe box-set Out Beyond the River: The Compulsion Years which featured an expanded version of the original album augmented with bonus tracks and the previously released live album Without the Aid of a Safety Net. The set also included a DVD with highlights from the Glasgow Barrowlands concert and promo videos for "Ships" and "Alone". The set is housed in a clamshell box.

== Background ==
After the disappointing sales of their 1991 album No Place Like Home, Big Country were dropped by their label, Phonogram. The band decided to split up, but a couple of weeks later lead vocalist and guitarist Stuart Adamson phoned guitarist Bruce Watson to suggest the band give things another go, and in turn he and bassist Tony Butler agreed to reunite. The band were quickly signed to Compulsion by the label's boss Chris Briggs, who as an A&R man, had originally signed the band to Phonogram in 1982. They recorded The Buffalo Skinners as a trio alongside session drummer Simon Phillips.

In a 1993 interview with Sunday Life, Watson revealed that both Peace in Our Time and No Place Like Home (1991) were "stodgy affairs aimed at the American market" and a compromise to meet with Phonogram's commercial expectations for the band. Watson said, "Now we're back to doing what we do best – being Big Country. The new album is what we are about – we produced it ourselves and are really proud of it." In an interview with The Lennox Herald, Adamson said, "We decided to produce ourselves because ultimately we know what kind of sound we're looking for. In terms of the spirit and commitment this is the best record we've made since the first two. We were told [by Compulsion] just to go in, record it and get over what we wanted musically."

Once the band's former drummer Mark Brzezicki heard the album, he asked to rejoin the band and did so in time for the band's forthcoming tour.

== Critical reception ==
Professional ratings
Review scores
Source	Rating
AllMusic	3/5 stars
NME	3/10

On its release, Neil McKay of Sunday Life praised The Buffalo Skinners as "a long overdue return to form". He wrote, "With the guitars right up front this strays close to hard rock territory, but the songs are as rousing and tuneful as in their early heyday." Adam Sweeting of The Guardian described the album as "quaintly old-fashioned, but performed with conviction". He added, "Big Country still write strident rock anthems with a tartan twist, and reflect on love, greed and blue-collar angst."

Johnny Dee of NME noted that, despite the "echo-urban-warrior chest thumpery", the album is "still plain old flag-waving rock" which "couples squalling six-string excess" with the band's "more familiar triumphant, fists in the air, 'we-shall-overcome-just-be-yourself' lager advert choruses". He praised the band's "talent for exultant, fanfaring stadium rock" but felt that their "resolutely poker-faced earnestness makes them so ripe for ridicule". He felt the overriding lyrical theme saw them "cast as some kind of new world superheroes surveying a planet destroyed by mega-corp empire building" which would be "fair enough if the lyrics themselves weren't so much hackneyed school project marvellous". Dee concluded, "One man's passionate anthemic epic-rock is another man's heap of steaming soft metal dung. Whatever your persuasion, The Buffalo Skinners, destined to be Big Country's sixth top ten album, won't disappoint."

== Track listing ==
All tracks are written by Stuart Adamson; except where noted.

No.	Title	Writer(s)	Length
1.	"Alone"		5:08
2.	"Seven Waves"	Bruce Watson	4:43
3.	"What Are You Working For"		4:00
4.	"The One I Love"	Adamson, Watson	5:02
5.	"Long Way Home"		5:55
6.	"The Selling of America"	Adamson, Butler	4:20
7.	"We're Not in Kansas"		6:23
8.	"Ships"	Adamson, Watson	5:53
9.	"All Go Together"	Adamson, Watson	4:11
10.	"Winding Wind"		4:30
11.	"Pink Marshmallow Moon"	Adamson, Watson	4:24
12.	"Chester's Farm"	Adamson, Tony Butler	4:37

== Personnel ==
Big Country

- Stuart Adamson – guitar, vocals
- Tony Butler – bass guitar, backing vocals
- Bruce Watson – guitar, mandolin

Additional personnel

- Colin Berwick – keyboards
- Joe Bull – programming
- Simon Phillips – drums

== Charts ==
Chart (1993)	Peak position
UK Albums Chart	25
US AOR Albums (Radio & Records)	20
US New Rock Albums (Radio & Records)	17
