= Beautiful People (Big Country song) =

Single by Big Country

from the album No Place Like Home
- Released: 7 October 1991
- Length: 3:23 (single version); 5:33 (album version)
- Label: Vertigo; Phonogram
- Songwriter: Stuart Adamson
- Producer: Pat Moran

Big Country singles chronology
| "Republican Party Reptile" (1991) | "Beautiful People" (1991) | "Alone" (1993) |

"Beautiful People" is a song by Scottish rock band Big Country, which was released in 1991 as the second and final single from their fifth studio album No Place Like Home. It was written by Stuart Adamson and produced by Pat Moran. "Beautiful People" reached No. 72 on the UK Singles Chart, and No. 36 on the BBC's Heavy Metal/Rock chart.

== Background ==
Speaking to the Big Country fanzine Inwards in 1991, Adamson said of the song: "This is about how you can find cool things in the most fucked-up places."

== Music video ==
The song's music video was directed by Roger Pomphrey and was shot in Peckham, London.

== Critical reception ==
Upon its release, Peter Kinghorn of Newcastle Evening Chronicle described "Beautiful People" as a "gently rolling singalong tune" with "plinking banjo and piano". John Peel, reviewing the single for New Musical Express, commented, "It sounds like Mungo Jerry. My dad would have described it as half-baked piffle and he'd have been right. Sorry, Stuart." For the same magazine, Stuart Maconie added, "Gone, now, the tear-jerking bagpipe skirls that inspired a million poly students to jump on tables in the Union bar. In common with most of their 'established rock band' ilk, Big Country now aspire to the condition of impoverished negro bluesmen or busking tramps. This is miserable."

In a review of No Place Like Home, Craig McLean of Vox felt the song's piano "honks and tonks agreeably". Steve Stewart of The Press and Journal considered the album to present "a different style of music" from Big Country. He commented, "There is a slower, more relaxed feel to their sound, as displayed in 'Beautiful People'." In a review of one of the band's 1991 concerts, David Sinclair of The Times noted the song's "honky-tonk piano, mandolin and mellow sentiments".

In a retrospective review of the single, JT Griffith of AllMusic felt "Return to the Two Headed King" and "Fly Like An Eagle" were "unimpressive", with "Beautiful People" being "by far [the] strongest song".

== Track listing ==
7" and cassette single

1. "Beautiful People" - 3:23
2. "Return to the Two Headed King" - 4:27

12" single

1. "Beautiful People" - 3:23
2. "Return to the Two Headed King" - 4:27
3. "Fly Like An Eagle" - 4:46
4. "Rockin in the Free World" (Live) - 6:35

CD single

1. "Beautiful People" - 3:23
2. "Return to the Two Headed King" - 4:27
3. "Fly Like An Eagle" - 4:46
4. "Rockin in the Free World" (Live) - 6:35

== Personnel ==
Big Country

- Stuart Adamson - vocals, guitar
- Bruce Watson - guitar
- Tony Butler - bass

Production

- Pat Moran - producer, engineer
- Big Country - producers of "Return to the Two Headed King"
- Bruce Watson - producer of "Fly Like An Eagle" and "Rockin in the Free World"
- Nigel Luby - mixing on "Fly Like An Eagle" and "Rockin in the Free World"

Other

- Zarkowski Designs - design, artwork

== Charts ==
| Chart (1991) | Peak position |
|---|---|
| UK Singles Chart | 72 |
