= Ships (Where Were You) =

Single by Big Country

from the album The Buffalo Skinners
- B-side: "Oh Well"
- Released: 19 April 1993
- Length: 5:54
- Label: Compulsion; Chrysalis
- Songwriters: Stuart Adamson; Bruce Watson
- Producer: Big Country

Big Country singles chronology
| "Alone" (1993) | "Ships (Where Were You)" (1993) | "The One I Love" (1993) |

Music video
- "Ships (Where Were You)" on YouTube

"Ships (Where Were You)" is a song by Scottish rock band Big Country, written by Stuart Adamson (lyrics, music) and Bruce Watson (music). The song was originally recorded for and included on the band's fifth studio album No Place Like Home (1991). It was then re-recorded for their following album, The Buffalo Skinners (1993), and released as the album's second single on 19 April 1993. "Ships (Where Were You)" reached number 29 in the UK Singles Chart and remained in the top 75 for three weeks.

== Background ==
"Ships" was written by band members Stuart Adamson and Bruce Watson. In a 1991 interview for the Big Country fanzine Inwards, Adamson described his lyrics as being "about people that think they get passed by, by things, because everybody does at certain times". The song was originally recorded for the Big Country's fifth studio album No Place Like Home (1991). The first version to be recorded during the sessions for the album was performed in the usual full band format, which bassist Tony Butler later stated "sounded fantastic". When producer Pat Moran introduced the band to keyboardist Ritchie Close, "Ships" was re-recorded by Adamson and Close as a piano-based track, with synthesised strings. Butler recalled, "The version Stuart did with Richie was just spine-tingling. The minute we heard it, we were all blown away."

By the time the band came to record their next album, The Buffalo Skinners, in 1992, they decided to re-record "Ships" and give it the "guitar treatment" as they expressed dissatisfaction with the version which appeared on No Place Like Home. Guitarist Bruce Watson told the Lennox Herald in 1993, "We didn't like how 'Ships' and 'We're Not in Kansas' turned out [on No Place Like Home]. Our relationship with Phonogram Records was at an all-time low and we simply weren't doing justice to some of the songs we'd written, so we decided to go back in and do them again." In a 1993 interview with Simon McKenzie, Adamson stated, "I'll [tell] you how bad things got. When I took the original demo versions of 'Ships' and 'Kansas' to the record company, they didn't even want them on No Place Like Home. They couldn't even hear them as songs."

The re-recorded version was released as the second single from The Buffalo Skinners on 19 April 1993. It reached number 29 in the UK Singles Chart, giving the band their fifteenth top 40 entry in the chart.

== Music video ==
The song's music video was directed by Nick Morris and produced by Fiona O'Mahoney for Spudnick Productions. Most of the video captures the band performing the song in a warehouse setting.

== Critical reception ==
Upon its release as a single in 1993, Peter Kinghorn of the Newcastle Evening Chronicle described the song as a "powerful rock ballad" with a "fine performance". Andrew Hirst of the Huddersfield Daily Examiner considered it to be "the quietest track on the noisy Buffalo Skinners album", but added that "it's definitely not the runt of the litter". He praised it "a deeply metaphoric lament which more than deserves its leap into the charts at 29".

In a review of The Buffalo Skinners, Dick Hogan of The Gazette considered the song to be a combination of Eagles' "Witchy Woman" and the Rolling Stones' "Wild Horses". He commented, "Here Big Country varies its straight-ahead driving sound with a softer beginning before kicking into overdrive. The lyric is a dark picture about human despair." Christi Conover of The Daily Herald commented: "...when things slow down for the song 'Ships', the listener discovers a beautiful utilization of piano and keyboards."

== Track listing ==
7-inch single

1. "Ships (Where Were You)" – 5:54
2. "Oh Well" – 2:18

CD single

1. "Ships (Where Were You)" – 5:54
2. "Woodstock" – 4:13
3. "Oh Well" – 2:18
4. "(Don't Fear) The Reaper" – 4:30

CD single (UK #2)

1. "Ships (Where Were You)" – 5:54
2. "Buffalo Skinners" – 4:59
3. "Cracked Actor" – 3:09
4. "Paranoid" – 2:46

CD single (UK promo)

1. "Ships (Where Were You)" (Radio Edit) – 4:10
2. "Ships (Where Were You)" (Full Length) – 5:54

== Personnel ==
=== 1993 recording ===
Big Country

- Stuart Adamson – vocals, guitar
- Bruce Watson – guitar
- Tony Butler – bass, backing vocals

Additional musicians

- Colin Berwick – keyboards
- Simon Phillips – drums

Production

- Big Country – producers (all tracks), mixing (all tracks except "Ships" and "Buffalo Skinners")
- Dave Bascombe – mixing on "Ships"
- Chris Sheldon – recording on "Ships" and "Buffalo Skinners", mixing on "Buffalo Skinners"
- Simon Dawson – recording on "Oh Well", "Woodstock", "(Don't Fear) The Reaper" and "Paranoid"

== Charts ==
| Chart (1993) | Peak position |
|---|---|
| Canada Top Singles (RPM) | 54 |
| Europe (Eurochart Hot 100 Singles) | 68 |
| Iceland (Íslenski Listinn Topp 40) | 28 |
| UK Singles (OCC) | 29 |
