= Alone (Big Country song) =

Single by Big Country

from the album The Buffalo Skinners
- Released: 1 March 1993
- Recorded: 1992
- Length: 5:08
- Label: Compulsion; Chrysalis
- Songwriter: Stuart Adamson
- Producer: Big Country

Big Country singles chronology
"Beautiful People" (1991)	"Alone" (1993)	"Ships (Where Were You)" (1993)

"Alone" is a song by Scottish rock band Big Country, released in March 1993 by Compulsion and Chrysalis Records as the lead single from their sixth studio album, The Buffalo Skinners (1993). It was written by Stuart Adamson and produced by Big Country. "Alone" reached number 24 in the UK Singles Chart and remained in the top 100 for three weeks.

== Background ==
The release of "Alone" as the album's first single was a band decision. Adamson told the fanzine Country Club in 1993, "I always wanted that as the first single. I wanted the first single to be a rock track and the record company were happy to go along with that."

== Music video ==
The song's music video was directed by Roger Pomphrey and was produced by Caroline Thomas for Partizan Films. It features the band performing the song on a stage, interspersed with black-and-white clips of singer Stuart Adamson walking along the Cornish coast. Martin Chambers made a guest appearance as the band's drummer, although he did not actually perform on the recording. The video was released on 15 February 1993.

== Critical reception ==
Upon its release as a single, Larry Flick of Billboard commented, "Familiar traces of a Scottish accent in Adamson's strong, melodic vocal notwithstanding, the band effectively reintroduces itself on this single - and radio should welcome it back. Alternating passages of light and heavy pop are mixed with a crashing beat and blazing lead-guitar lines." In a review of The Buffalo Skinners, Neil McKay of Sunday Life described the song as "rousing and tuneful as in [Big Country's] early heyday". Dan Hyatt of the Albuquerque Journal noted: "The first song, "Alone," has all the earmarks of an anthem for the '90s, kind of a "what's my place in the world, and why" song."

Kevin Belvins of The Leader-Post noted: "The album's refreshing tone is set immediately with the frantic opening cut "Alone"." In a review of one of the band's 1993 concerts, Diana Aitchison of the St. Louis Post-Dispatch commented: "One song to watch for on the charts is "Alone," which opens with a moody staccato guitar and gels with the band's signature reeling bagpipe sound." Johnny Loftus of AllMusic described the song as "a template for the entire album", with "churning guitar and bass", an "impossibly triumphant chorus" and "rangy solo".

== Track listing ==
- Cassette single
1. "Alone" – 5:08
2. "Chance" (Live) – 7:28
- CD single and UK 12-inch single
1. "Alone" – 5:08
2. "Never Take Your Place" – 4:01
3. "Rockin' in the Free World" – 6:47
- CD single (UK #1)
1. "Alone" – 5:08
2. "Rockin' in the Free World" – 6:47
3. "Eastworld" – 4:39
4. "Chance" (Live) – 7:28
- CD single (UK #2)
1. "Alone" – 5:08
2. "Never Take Your Place" – 4:01
3. "Winter Sky" (Live) – 4:36
4. "Look Away" (Live) – 4:42
- CD single (US promo)
1. "Alone" (Album Version) – 5:08
2. "Alone (Edit) – 4:06

== Personnel ==
Big Country

- Stuart Adamson – vocals, guitar
- Bruce Watson – guitar
- Tony Butler – bass, backing vocals

Additional musicians

- Simon Phillips – drums

Production

- Big Country – producers of "Alone", producers and mixing on "Never Take Your Place", "Rockin' in the Free World" and "Eastworld"
- Mike Fraser – mixing on "Alone"
- Chris Sheldon – recording on "Alone" and "Rockin' in the Free World"
- Stuart Hamilton – recording on "Never Take Your Place" and "Eastworld"
- Pete Dauncey – producer of "Chance", "Winter Sky" and "Look Away" (Live)
- Gareth Watson – engineer on "Chance", "Winter Sky" and "Look Away" (Live)

== Charts ==
Chart (1993)	Peak position
Australia (ARIA)	195
UK Singles (OCC)	24
