= National Lampoon 1964 High School Yearbook Parody =

American humor book

- Editors: P. J. O'Rourke and Doug Kenney
- Authors: P. J. O'Rourke, Doug Kenney, Sean Kelly, Christopher Cerf, Ed Subitzky
- Cover artist: Vincent Aiosa
- Language: English
- Release number: Vol. 1, No. 6
- Genre: Parody
- Publisher: National Lampoon
- Publication date: 1973
- Publication place: United States
- Media type: Print (hardback)
- Pages: 176
- ISBN: 978-0930368357

National Lampoon 1964 High School Yearbook Parody is an American humor book that was first published in 1973. It was a spin-off from National Lampoon magazine. The book was a parody of a high school yearbook from the early 1960s.

The parody was edited by Lampoon regulars P. J. O'Rourke and Douglas Kenney and art-directed by David Kaestle. Much of the writing was by O'Rourke and Kenney. (It was based on an earlier National Lampoon two-page piece, "1956 High School Yearbook," by Kenney and Michael O'Donoghue.) The "literary magazine" was written by Sean Kelly; the sports page was by Christopher Cerf; and the Principal's Letter and the "In Memorium" piece were both written by Ed Subitzky.

Time magazine cited the National Lampoon 1964 High School Yearbook Parody as an example of "the best comic writing in the country," writing that "the book is so rich in social detail that it brings a whole fictional town, Dacron, Ohio, to life." It "sold more than 2 million copies on the newsstands"; it was reissued in 2004.

== Overview ==
The book, as it was originally published, appeared to be a genuine 1964 yearbook from "C. Estes Kefauver High School": the Kefauver Kaleidoscope. (Senator Estes Kefauver of Tennessee was known for his campaigns against pornography, comic books, and juvenile delinquency; he had died in 1963.) The Lampoon yearbook very closely mimics the style and content of actual yearbooks from the period, only deviating in subtle ways. (As O'Rourke said about putting the parody together, "We had a room full of yearbooks and we realized they were all alike.")

The fictional Kefauver High School is located in "Dacron, Ohio" (a three-part reference to Akron, Dayton, and the inexpensive synthetic fabric Dacron). The parody is closely based on Toledo, Ohio's (Note: Toledo, Ohio, and Cleveland, Ohio are the metropolitan areas nearest Sandusky, Ohio — setting of The King of Sandusky, a fictionalized account of O'Rourke's childhood.) DeVilbiss High School (DHS) yearbook, called the Pot O' Gold. (O'Rourke graduated from DHS in 1965.) As portrayed in the Lampoon yearbook, the fictional Kefauver High School shares scores of characteristics with DeVilbiss, including the street address and the school colors. Those colors, the rainbow, influenced the names of both the real DeVilbiss yearbook and the fictional Kefauver one. The name of the Kefauver school newspaper, the Prism, and its motto are the same as those of DeVilbiss. The swim team photo caption contains the names of a number of O'Rourke's friends from DeVilbiss. There are also numerous references in the Lampoon to West Toledo landmarks and locations.

The publication also included a copy of the school newspaper, a basketball program, a report card, a diploma, detention slips, and a fake ID.

== Connection to Animal House and legacy ==
According to apparent inscriptions, the book belonged to "Larry Kroger", class of '64. Anachronistically, the character Larry Kroger is the college freshman protagonist (played by Tom Hulce) of the comedy movie National Lampoon's Animal House, released in 1978 (but set in 1962, two years before the parody yearbook). The character "Mandy Pepperidge" also makes her first appearance in the yearbook and reappears in the film, played by Mary Louise Weller. Dean "Vernon Wormer", a P.E. and civics teacher as well as an athletic coach in the yearbook, is played by John Vernon in Animal House.

Five years after the Yearbook parody, in 1978, the National Lampoon published the National Lampoon Sunday Newspaper Parody, a fake Sunday newspaper which also claimed to originate in "Dacron, Ohio" but was contemporary, being dated Sunday, February 12, 1978.

== Cover ==
The cover photo was taken by Vincent Aiosa. The credits list the cheerleaders on the cover as models Roberta Caplan, Celia Bau, and Laura Singer. The cover is a one-off gag, unrelated to any of the stories inside.
