= You Dreamer =

Single by Big Country

from the album Why the Long Face
- Released: 21 August 1995
- Length: 3:44 (single version); 4:50 (album version)
- Label: Transatlantic
- Songwriter: Stuart Adamson
- Producers: Big Country; Chris Sheldon

Big Country singles chronology
"I'm Not Ashamed" (1995)	"You Dreamer" (1995)	"Non!" (1995)

"You Dreamer" is a song by Scottish rock band Big Country, which was released in 1995 as the second and final single from their seventh studio album Why the Long Face. It was written by Stuart Adamson, and produced by Big Country and Chris Sheldon. "You Dreamer" reached No. 68 on the UK Singles Chart.

== Background ==
Adamson described the song's lyrical message to the fan club magazine Country Club in 1995: "This one's inspired by those people who always make plans but whose plans just never seem to work out - the ones who never get a break. You could say it's about always being in the shadowed area of the garden instead of the sunny bit in the middle."

In a 1995 issue of the Big Country fanzine All of Us, drummer Mark Brzezicki picked "You Dreamer" as his favourite of the tracks on Why the Long Face: "Slight change of direction musically and harmonically. It's also an obvious single."

In January 1996, "You Dreamer" was one of six singles and an album released by three UK independent labels (Castle Communications, Edel and Love This Records) to have their sale history examined by the British Phonographic Industry after "allegations of irregular sales patterns of records". With "You Dreamer" and Energy Orchard's Pain Killer representing Castle Communications, the BPI found evidence that records had been "'bought in' in an attempt to enhance chart positions". The BPI fined Castle Communications £30,000 as a result of their findings.

== Critical reception ==
In a review of Why the Long Face, Jerry Ewing of Metal Hammer wrote: "Why the Long Face is all muscular riffs, rock solid rhythms and singalong chorus[es]. The opening salvo of "You Dreamer", "Message of Love" and "I'm Not Ashamed" set out the band's agenda perfectly; rousing hard rock in the finest British tradition that remains evergreen and peerless." Tom Lanham of CMJ New Music Monthly wrote: "From the sweeping opener, "You Dreamer," it's clear that Big Country means business - there's that old familiar E-bow chime, Adamson's perpetual guitar sustain that always seems to echo a clutch of bagpipes wheezing from some Highland crag. Then his raspy, whiskeyed voice sidles in, familiar as an old friend." John Terlesky of The Morning Call felt the song contained "some laudable, if simplistic, social commentary" but that it was not "helped by a pedestrian, rock-of-the-'80s musical backing".

In a review of the 2018 deluxe edition of Why the Long Face, the Hartlepool Mail commented: "The singles, "I'm Not Ashamed" and "You Dreamer", are the equal of most of their more celebrated back catalogue, but made little impact [at the time]." Peter Roche of AXS described the song as an "electrifying ode to shattered dreams" which "keeps positive rather than give up the ghost to adversity". He also noted the song "rides high on a bagpipe-esque guitar riff and rugged [and] dirty power chords". John Bergstrom of PopMatters praised "You Dreamer" as having "a strong enough chorus to make it stand out" and added: "[It] actually sounds like that elusive radio hit, even though it wasn't."

== Track listing ==
12" single

1. "You Dreamer" - 3:44
2. "Hardly a Mountain" (HITW Tapes) - 3:58
3. "Golden Boy Loves Golden Girl" (HITW Tapes) - 4:39
4. "Can You Feel the Winter" (HITW Tapes) - 6:36

CD single

1. "You Dreamer" - 3:40
2. "Ice Cream Smile" - 3:54
3. "Magic in Your Eyes" - 2:59
4. "Bianca" - 4:39

CD single (limited edition)

1. "You Dreamer" - 3:40
2. "I'm Eighteen" - 2:57
3. "Vicious" - 3:15
4. "On the Road Again" - 4:19

CD single (promo)

1. "You Dreamer" - 3:40

== Personnel ==
Big Country

- Stuart Adamson - vocals, guitar
- Bruce Watson - guitar
- Tony Butler - bass, backing vocals, vocals on "On the Road Again"
- Mark Brzezicki - drums, percussion, backing vocals

Production

- Chris Sheldon - producer on "You Dreamer", mixing and engineer
- Big Country - producers (all tracks)
- Graham Stewart - assistant engineer
- George Marino - mastering

== Charts ==
Chart (1995)	Peak position
UK Singles Chart	68
