= Give War a Chance =

1992 book by P. J. O'Rourke

- First edition
- Author: P. J. O'Rourke
- Language: English
- Genre: Essay collection
- Publisher: Atlantic Monthly Press
- Publication date: 1992
- Publication place: United States
- Media type: Print (paperback)
- Pages: 233
- ISBN: 9780330325363
- OCLC: 24846923

Give War a Chance: Eyewitness Accounts of Mankind's Struggle Against Tyranny, Injustice and Alcohol-Free Beer is a 1992 book by American writer P. J. O'Rourke. The pieces in the book start with reports about glasnost and end with his accounts as a reporter for Rolling Stone on the Gulf War.
