= Holidays in Hell =

1988 book by P.J. O'Rourke

- First edition
- Author: P. J. O'Rourke
- Language: English
- Subject: Travel
- Publisher: Atlantic Monthly Press
- Publication date: 1988
- Publication place: United States
- Media type: Print
- Pages: 257
- ISBN: 0-87113-240-0

Holidays in Hell is a non-fiction book by P.J. O'Rourke about his visits to areas of conflict during the 1980s as a foreign correspondent, as well as to some less high-profile locations.

== Places visited ==
=== Lebanon, October 1984 ===
During the Lebanese Civil War:

Lebanon is an endless series of faces, with gun barrels, poking through the car window... Some of these faces belong to the Lebanese Army, some to the Christian Phalange, some to angry Shiites or blustering Druse or grumpy Syrian draftees, or Scarsdale-looking Israeli reservists

— P.J. O'Rourke, Holidays in Hell

=== Korea, December 1987 ===
After the June Struggle, during the chaos that accompanied the democratic elections that followed:

They don't like anyone who isn't Korean, and they don't like each other all that much either. They're hardheaded, hard-drinking, tough little bastards, "the Irish of Asia"

— P.J. O'Rourke, Holidays in Hell

=== Panama, July 1987 ===
During the Manuel Noriega regime, and the protests against it:

It's not really rich versus poor. It's more like the Elks versus the Rotary Club. The dentists and bank tellers are mad at the meter maids and postal clerks.

— P.J. O'Rourke, Holidays in Hell

=== Poland, May 1986 ===
Under Soviet control and communism.

=== United States ===
- January 1987: Heritage USA
- September 1986: Harvard 350th anniversary celebration
- May 1983: Epcot
- December 1987: Reagan/Gorbachev Summit

=== Philippines, March 1987 ===
After the end of the Marcos regime

=== El Salvador ===
During the Salvadoran Civil War

=== Australia, February 1987 ===
At the 1987 America's Cup

=== South Africa, December 1986 ===
During apartheid, but during the period in which activists in the United States and Europe were calling for divestment from South Africa.

=== Various nations in western Europe, April–May 1986 ===
[On West Berlin] We bombed the place flat in WWII, and they rebuilt it as a pretty good imitation of Minneapolis

— P.J. O'Rourke, Holidays in Hell

=== Nicaragua, September 1987 ===
During the Sandinista period, and when the U.S. backed Contras were waging a civil war.

Now, a lot of people tell me this gray and depressing atmosphere is a product of the civil war ... I have, however been in places where guerilla wars were being fought—El Salvador, the Philippines and Lebanon. Those places weren't like this, and East Berlin, Poland, and Russia were.

— P.J. O'Rourke, Holidays in Hell
