= Driving Like Crazy =

2009 book by P.J. O'Rourke

- First edition
- Author: P. J. ORourke
- Publisher: Atlantic Monthly Press
- Publication date: 2009
- Publication place: US
- ISBN: 978-0-8021-1883-7

Driving Like Crazy: Thirty Years of Vehicular Hell-Bending, Celebrating America the Way It’s Supposed to Be -- With an Oil Well in Every Backyard, a Cadillac Escalade in Every Carport, and the Chairman of the Federal Reserve Mowing Our Lawn is a 2009 book by P. J. O'Rourke about the automobile. Its chapters include The End of the American Car, The Rolling Organ Donors Motorcycle Club, Getting Wrecked, The Geezers Grand Prix, and Call for a New National Park.

O'Rourke uses wit to recount his childhood growing up in an automobile dominated family. He recounts his adventures driving cross country in the Baja, the American West and the Indian subcontinent. In the final chapter he comments on the present state of the American auto industry.

In the Introduction O'Rourke calls his book "a collection of car journalism from 1977 to the present, a sort of social history...".
