= Peace in Our Time (Big Country album) =

Studio album by Big Country
- Released: 26 September 1988
- Recorded: March–June 1988
- Genres: Alternative rock, new wave, Celtic rock
- Length: 65:38
- Labels: Reprise (US); Mercury
- Producer: Peter Wolf

Big Country chronology
The Seer (1986)	Peace in Our Time (1988)	Through a Big Country: Greatest Hits (1990)

Singles from Peace in our Time
- 1. "King of Emotion" Released: 8 August 1988; 2. "Broken Heart (Thirteen Valleys)" Released: 17 October 1988; 3. "Peace in Our Time" Released: 23 January 1989

Peace in Our Time is the fourth studio album by the Scottish band Big Country, released in 1988.

== Critical reception ==
Professional ratings
Review scores
Source	Rating
AllMusic	2.5/5 stars
The Encyclopedia of Popular Music	3/5 stars
MusicHound Rock: The Essential Album Guide	1/5 stars
Record Mirror	2/5 stars
The Rolling Stone Album Guide	3/5 stars
The Village Voice	C

Trouser Press wrote, "Big Country took a surprising detour on the deliriously overproduced Peace in Our Time, which submerges its trademark sound in sanitized, synthesized musical settings ... [the] drastic recast feels like commercial desperation rather than artistic restlessness." The Chicago Tribune wrote that the album displays "a more gentle and subtle style and a crisper, more delicate sound".

== Track listing ==
All tracks are written by Stuart Adamson; except where noted.

Peace in Our Time track listing
No.	Title	Writer(s)	Length
1.	"King of Emotion"		4:50
2.	"Broken Heart (Thirteen Valleys)"		5:10
3.	"Thousand Yard Stare"	Adamson, Bruce Watson	3:57
4.	"From Here to Eternity"		4:54
5.	"Everything I Need"		4:39
6.	"Peace in Our Time"		4:34
7.	"Time for Leaving"	Adamson, Mark Brzezicki, Tony Butler, Watson	5:01
8.	"River of Hope"		4:29
9.	"In This Place"		4:21
10.	"I Could Be Happy Here"	Adamson, Watson	4:28

1996 remastered reissue bonus tracks
No.	Title	Writer(s)	Length
11.	"The Travellers"		3:13
12.	"When a Drum Beats"		5:01
13.	"Starred and Crossed"	Adamson, Watson	4:25
14.	"Longest Day"		6:36

== Personnel ==
Big Country

- Stuart Adamson – guitar, piano, vocals, e-bow
- Mark Brzezicki – drums, percussion
- Tony Butler – bass guitar, guitar, vocals
- Bruce Watson – guitar, harmonica, mandolin, sitar, vocals, e-bow

Additional personnel

- Peter Wolf – keyboards
- Maxine Anderson – backing vocals
- Merry Clayton – backing vocals
- Donna Davidson – backing vocals
- Josh Phillips – keyboards

== Charts ==
Chart performance for Peace in Our Time
Chart (1988)	Peak position
Finnish Albums (Suomen virallinen lista)	6
German Albums Chart	40
Swedish Albums Chart	25
UK Albums Chart	9
US Billboard 200	160
