= Peace in Our Time (Big Country song) =

Single by Big Country

from the album Peace in Our Time
- B-side: "Promised Land"
- Released: 23 January 1989
- Length: 4:33
- Label: Mercury; Reprise (US); Vertigo (Canada)
- Songwriter: Stuart Adamson
- Producer: Peter Wolf

Big Country singles chronology
"Broken Heart (Thirteen Valleys)" (1988)	"Peace in Our Time" (1989)	"Save Me" (1990)

"Peace in Our Time" is a song by Scottish rock band Big Country, released in 1989 as the third and final single from their fourth studio album Peace in Our Time (1988). It was written by Stuart Adamson and produced by Peter Wolf. "Peace in Our Time" reached number 39 in the UK Singles Chart and remained in the top 100 for three weeks.

== Background ==
In a 1990 interview with Melody Maker, Adamson described "Peace in Our Time" as a "very Sixties feel protest song, naive but I did it anyway." He added in an interview with Sounds, "I do feel music can be more than a three-minute adrenaline rush, but there's a great danger in viewing a song with too much weight. 'Peace in Our Time' was written with irony, but you can be too smart-assed for your own good. It was called a plea for peace when it was really much smaller than that."

== Release ==
"Peace in Our Time" was released in the UK on 23 January 1989. On 30 January, a limited-edition version of the single was issued on 12-inch vinyl. It contains four tracks which were recorded live at the Palace of Sports, Moscow, on 2 October 1988.

== Critical reception ==
Upon its release as a single, Tony Beard of Record Mirror commented, "This is a grand record, all large guitar solos, awesome power chords and a lyric that could set East-West relations back a few eons if ever the powers that be hear it." As guest reviewers for Number One, Simon Tedd and Shark of Big Bam Boo gave the song three stars and described it as "just another Big Country record" but one that's "good for fans".

Paul Taylor of the Manchester Evening News gave a mixed review. He considered it to be "more like the Big Country of old, if only because of the martial drum beat", but felt the song "is barely equal to its subject matter" and concluded that it was "sure to sound better in concert". Caren Myers of Melody Maker wrote, "This is so ponderously well-meaning it practically grinds to a halt. No tiny gossamer wings could lift this concrete hippopotamus of a single off the ground."

In a review of Peace in Our Time, Peter B. King of The Pittsburgh Press noted the song's "anthemic chorus" and described it as "catchy as the cold going around this newsroom". Brett Milano of The Boston Globe considered the song a "chunky rocker" which "recall[s] better days".

== Track listing ==
7-inch single

1. "Peace in Our Time" – 4:33
2. "Promised Land" (The R.E.L. Tapes) – 5:39

7-inch single (UK promo)

1. "Peace in Our Time" (Radio Edit) – 3:26
2. "Peace in Our Time" – 4:33

12-inch single

1. "Peace in Our Time" – 4:33
2. "Promised Land" (The R.E.L. Tapes) – 5:39
3. "Over the Border" (The R.E.L. Tapes) – 5:17
4. "The Longest Day" (The R.E.L. Tapes) – 6:36

12-inch single (UK limited edition)

1. "Peace in Our Time" (Live) – 5:01
2. "Chance" (Live) – 5:46
3. "In a Big Country" (Live) – 4:08
4. "Promised Land" (Live) – 4:52

CD single

1. "Peace in Our Time" – 4:33
2. "Chance" – 4:25
3. "The Longest Day" (The R.E.L. Tapes) – 6:36
4. "Promised Land" (The R.E.L. Tapes) – 5:39

CD single (US promo)

1. "Peace in Our Time" – 4:33

== Personnel ==
Big Country

- Stuart Adamson – vocals, guitar
- Bruce Watson – guitar
- Tony Butler – bass
- Mark Brzezicki – drums

Production

- Peter Wolf – producer of "Peace in Our Time"
- Big Country – producers of all tracks except "Peace in Our Time" and studio version of "Chance"
- Steve Lillywhite – producers of studio version of "Chance"
- Nigel Luby – recording of 1988 live tracks from Moscow
- Brian Malouf – engineer and mixing on "Peace in Our Time"
- Jeremy Smith – engineer on "Peace in Our Time"
- Gonzalo Espinoza, Jeff Poe, Kristen Connolly – assistant engineers on "Peace in Our Time"
- Geoff Pesche – mastering

== Charts ==
Chart (1989)	Peak position
Irish Singles Chart	16
UK Singles Chart	39
