= Broken Heart (Thirteen Valleys) =

Single by Big Country

from the album Peace in Our Time
- B-side: "Soapy Soutar Strikes Back"
- Released: 17 October 1988
- Length: 5:14
- Label: Mercury; Vertigo (Canada)
- Songwriter(s): Stuart Adamson
- Producer(s): Peter Wolf

Big Country singles chronology
"King of Emotion" (1988)	"Broken Heart (Thirteen Valleys)" (1988)	"Peace in Our Time" (1989)

"Broken Heart (Thirteen Valleys)" is a song by Scottish rock band Big Country, released on 17 October 1988 as the second single from their fourth studio album, Peace in Our Time. It was written by Stuart Adamson and produced by Peter Wolf. "Broken Heart (Thirteen Valleys)" reached number 47 in the UK Singles Chart and remained in the top 100 for four weeks.

== Background ==
"Broken Heart" originated with the track "The Longest Day" which Big Country recorded around 1985 but did not release. Adamson later took the chorus and melody from "The Longest Day" and incorporated it into "Broken Heart". "The Longest Day" was not released until it was included on the 1989 single release of "Peace in Our Time". In a 1988 radio interview, Adamson picked "Broken Heart" as one of his favourites from Peace in Our Time. He recalled of the song to Sounds in 1990, "I think it's the best song I've ever written. It works great on acoustic or electric. 'Thirteen Valleys' is the one that got away. I'll play that song, always. I'd put it up against any song."

== Music video ==
The song's music video was directed by Richard Lowenstein and shot near Wittenoom, Western Australia.

== Critical reception ==
Upon its release as a single, Alex Kadis of Smash Hits commented, "Though at first this sounds shockingly like 'She'll Be Coming 'Round the Mountain', it soon takes a turn for the better and becomes one of those superbly atmospheric songs that Big Country have become so famous for." Jim Whiteford of The Kilmarnock Standard praised it as "another powerful, atmospheric beat-ballad" from Big Country and added that the song "had me hooked [after] a couple of spins". Robin Smith of Record Mirror was critical in his review, commenting, "'Twas a time when I used to cock a leg to those stirring Gaelic airs, but now Big Country are so dull this bland muddy pop is pulling them under." Chris Roberts of Melody Maker called Big Country "obsolete and flabby and fake-Celtic as usual". James Masterton, in his 2019 book Chart Watch UK - Hits of 1989, considered the song "capable of standing shoulder to shoulder with past classics such as 'One Great Thing' and 'Fields of Fire'."

== Track listing ==
7-inch single

1. "Broken Heart (Thirteen Valleys)" – 5:14
2. "Soapy Soutar Strikes Back" – 4:15

12-inch single

1. "Broken Heart (Thirteen Valleys)" – 5:14
2. "Soapy Soutar Strikes Back" – 4:15
3. "When a Drum Beats" – 6:20
4. "On the Shore" – 3:39

CD single

1. "Broken Heart (Thirteen Valleys)" – 5:14
2. "Soapy Soutar Strikes Back" – 4:15
3. "Wonderland" (12" Version) – 7:10

CD single (UK limited edition)

1. "Broken Heart (Thirteen Valleys)" – 5:14
2. "Soapy Soutar Strikes Back" – 4:15
3. "Made in Heaven" – 5:10
4. "When a Drum Beats" – 5:04

Cassette and CD single (Canadian release)

1. "Broken Heart (Thirteen Valleys)" – 5:10
2. "Soapy Soutar Strikes Back" – 4:06
3. "When a Drum Beats" – 4:06
4. "Starred and Crossed" – 4:06

== Personnel ==
Big Country

- Stuart Adamson – vocals, guitar
- Bruce Watson – guitar
- Tony Butler – bass
- Mark Brzezicki – drums

Additional musicians

- Peter Wolf – keyboards

Production

- Peter Wolf – producer of "Broken Heart"
- Big Country – producers of all tracks except "Broken Heart" and "Wonderland"
- Steve Lillywhite – producer of "Wonderland"
- Brian Malouf – engineer and mixing on "Broken Heart"
- Jeremy Smith – engineer on "Broken Heart"
- Gonzalo Espinoza, Jeff Poe, Kristen Connolly – assistant engineers on "Broken Heart"
- Geoff Pesche – mastering

== Charts ==
Chart (1988)	Peak position
UK Singles Chart	47
