= Eat the Rich (book) =

1998 book by P.J. O'Rourke

Eat the Rich: A Treatise on Economics
- Author: P. J. O'Rourke
- Language: English
- Genre: Non-fiction
- Publication date: 1998
- Publication place: United States

Eat the Rich: A Treatise on Economics is a 1998 book by P. J. O'Rourke that explains his view of economics in a humorous way.

In the book, O’Rourke embarks on a tour of different countries, critiquing their economic systems in turn. He describes ‘Good Capitalism’ (Wall Street, USA), ‘Bad Capitalism’ (Albania), ‘Good Socialism’ (Sweden), ‘Bad Socialism’ (Cuba), before covering Russia, Tanzania, Hong Kong (just after handover to China), and Shanghai. O’Rourke writes humorously in a Gonzo journalism style, ultimately concluding that his own view of a libertarian economic model is best.
