= P. J. O'Rourke =

American political satirist and journalist (1947–2022)

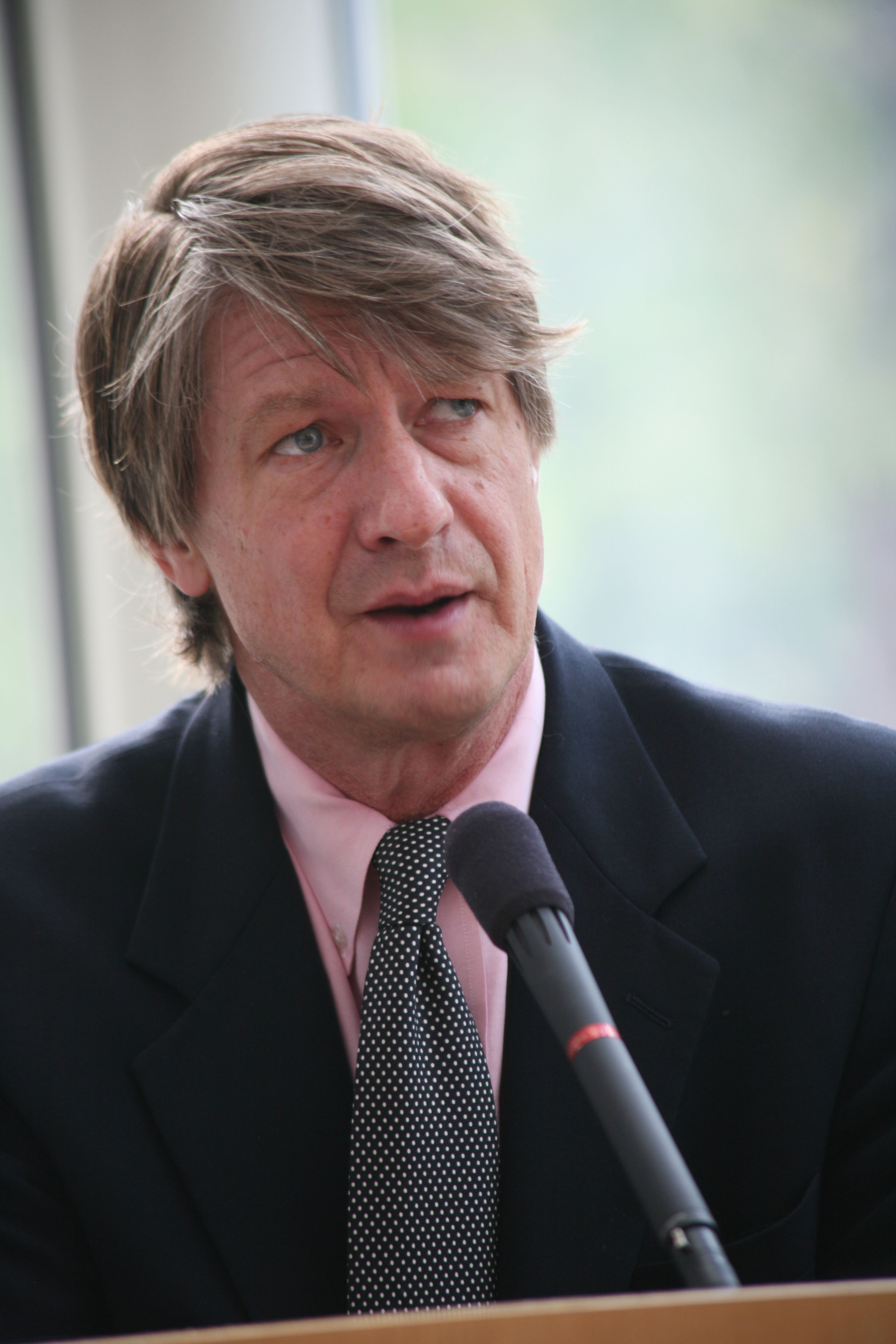
- O'Rourke in 2007
- Born: Patrick Jake O'Rourke; November 14, 1947; Toledo, Ohio, U.S.
- Died: February 15, 2022 (aged 74); Sharon, New Hampshire, U.S.
- Education: Miami University; Johns Hopkins University
- Occupations: Political satirist; journalist
- Political party: Republican (1978–2022) Independent(1972-1978)
- Spouses: Amy Lumet (m. 1990; div. 1993); Tina Mallon (m. 1995)
- Children: Elizabeth, Olivia, Edward
- Website: www.pjorourke.com

Patrick Jake O'Rourke (November 14, 1947 – February 15, 2022) was an American author, journalist, and political satirist who wrote twenty-two books on subjects as diverse as politics, cars, etiquette, and economics. His books Parliament of Whores and Give War a Chance both reached No. 1 on The New York Times bestseller list.

After beginning his career writing for the National Lampoon, O'Rourke went on to serve as foreign affairs desk chief for Rolling Stone where he reported from far-flung places. Later he wrote for a number of publications, including The Atlantic, the Daily Beast, the Wall Street Journal, and the Weekly Standard, and was a longtime panelist on NPR's Wait Wait... Don't Tell Me!.

The Forbes Media Guide Five Hundred, 1994 states, "O'Rourke's original reporting, irreverent humor, and crackerjack writing makes for delectable reading. He never minces words or pulls his punches, whatever the subject."

== Early life and education ==
O'Rourke was born in Toledo, Ohio, on November 14, 1947, the son of Delphine (née Loy), a housewife, and Clifford Bronson O'Rourke, a car salesman. O'Rourke had Irish ancestry that traces back to County Roscommon. He graduated from Toledo's DeVilbiss High School in 1965, received his undergraduate degree from Miami University in 1969 and earned a Master of Arts in English at Johns Hopkins University. Many of O'Rourke's essays recount that during his student days he was a leftist, anti-war hippie, but that in the 1970s his political views underwent a volte-face. He emerged as a political observer and humorist rooted in libertarian conservatism.

== Career ==
O'Rourke wrote articles for several publications, including "A.J. at N.Y.U." for The Rip Off Review of Western Culture, an underground magazine/comic book, in 1972, as well as pieces for the Baltimore underground newspaper Harry and the New York Ace, before joining National Lampoon in 1973, where he served as editor-in-chief, among other roles, and authored articles such as "Foreigners Around the World" and "How to Drive Fast on Drugs While Getting Your Wing-Wang Squeezed and Not Spill Your Drink".

O'Rourke received a writing credit for National Lampoon's Lemmings which helped launch the careers of Chevy Chase and Christopher Guest. He also co-wrote National Lampoon's 1964 High School Yearbook with Douglas Kenney. This inspired the cult comedy, Animal House, which launched the career of John Belushi.

Going freelance in 1981, O'Rourke had his work published in Playboy, Vanity Fair, Car and Driver, and Rolling Stone. He became foreign-affairs desk chief at Rolling Stone, where he remained until 2001. In 1996, he served as the conservative commentator in the point-counterpoint segment of 60 Minutes. During the Bosnian genocide, O'Rourke referred to the American public's lack of interest in Bosnia as a way to joke about "the unspellables killing the unpronounceables".

O'Rourke published over 20 books, including three New York Times bestsellers. Parliament of Whores and Give War a Chance reached No. 1 on The New York Times Best Seller list. He also wrote Modern Manners and Holidays in Hell. O'Rourke was a "Real Time Real Reporter" for Real Time with Bill Maher covering the 2008 presidential election. In the UK, he was known as the face of a long-running series of television advertisements for British Airways in the 1990s.

O'Rourke also worked on screenplays in Hollywood, including Rodney Dangerfield's Easy Money.

In 2009, O'Rourke described the nascent presidency of Barack Obama as "the Carter administration in better sweaters". However, in 2016, he endorsed presidential candidate Hillary Clinton over Donald Trump. O'Rourke stated that his endorsement included her "lies and empty promises" and added "She's wrong about absolutely everything, but she's wrong within normal parameters".

== Personal life ==
From 1990 to 1993, O'Rourke was married to Amy Lumet, a daughter of movie director Sidney Lumet and a granddaughter of Lena Horne. In 1995, he married Tina Mallon; they had three children: daughters Elizabeth and Olivia and son Clifford. In an interview with the New Statesman published in January 2012, O'Rourke said, "Despite my name, I wasn't raised a Catholic. My mother was a Protestant, of a traditional American, vague kind: she belonged to the church that the nice people in the neighbourhood went to. My wife is a Catholic, the kids are Catholic, so I'm a Catholic fellow-traveller."

In September 2008, O'Rourke announced that he had been diagnosed with treatable rectal cancer, from which he expected "a 95% chance of survival".

== Death ==
O'Rourke died from lung cancer at his home in Sharon, New Hampshire, on February 15, 2022, at the age of 74.

== Writing ==
External videos
- Presentation by O'Rourke on Eat the Rich, September 15, 1998, C-SPAN
- Booknotes interview with O'Rourke on Eat the Rich, January 3, 1999, C-SPAN
- Presentation by O'Rourke on The CEO of the Sofa, November 10, 2001, C-SPAN
- Presentation by O'Rourke on Peace Kills, June 22, 2004, C-SPAN
- Presentation by O'Rourke on Driving Like Crazy, June 13, 2009, C-SPAN
- Presentation by O'Rourke on Don't Vote, It Just Encourages the Bastards, November 3, 2010, C-SPAN
- Presentation by O'Rourke on The Baby Boom, January 15, 2014, C-SPAN
- Interview with O'Rourke on Thrown Under the Omnibus, November 22, 2015, C-SPAN
- Presentation by O'Rourke on Thrown Under the Omnibus, November 22, 2015, C-SPAN
- Presentation by O'Rourke on How the Hell Did This Happen?, March 27, 2017, C-SPAN
- Presentation by O'Rourke on None of My Business, September 2, 2018, C-SPAN
- Interview with O'Rourke on A Cry from the Far Middle, September 15, 2020, C-SPAN

O'Rourke was a proponent of gonzo journalism; one of his earliest and best-regarded pieces was "How to Drive Fast on Drugs While Getting Your Wing-Wang Squeezed and Not Spill Your Drink", a National Lampoon article in March 1979. The article was republished in two of his books, Republican Party Reptile (1987) and Driving Like Crazy (2009).

O'Rourke's best-received book is Parliament of Whores, subtitled A Lone Humorist Attempts to Explain the Entire U.S. Government, whose main argument, according to the author, "is that politics are boring". He described himself as a libertarian.

O'Rourke typed his manuscripts on an IBM Selectric typewriter, though he denied being a Luddite, asserting that his short attention span would have made focusing on writing on a computer difficult.

== Bibliography ==
- National Lampoon 1964 High School Yearbook Parody (1974; with Doug Kenney); ISBN 978-1-59071-057-9
- National Lampoon Sunday Newspaper Parody (1978; with John Hughes); ISBN 978-1-59071-037-1
- Modern Manners (1983); ISBN 978-0-87113-375-5
- The Bachelor Home Companion (1986); ISBN 978-0-87113-686-2
- Republican Party Reptile (1987); ISBN 978-0-87113-622-0
- Holidays in Hell (1989); ISBN 978-0-8021-3701-2
- Parliament of Whores (1991); ISBN 978-0-8021-3970-2
- Give War a Chance (1992); ISBN 978-0-679-74201-2
- All the Trouble in the World (1994); ISBN 978-0-87113-611-4
- Age and Guile Beat Youth, Innocence, and a Bad Haircut (1995); ISBN 978-0-87113-653-4
- The American Spectator's Enemies List (1996); ISBN 978-0-87113-632-9
- Eat the Rich (1999); ISBN 978-0-87113-760-9
- The CEO of the Sofa (2001); ISBN 978-0-8021-3940-5
- Peace Kills: America's Fun New Imperialism (2004); ISBN 978-0-8021-4198-9
- On the Wealth of Nations: Books That Changed the World (2007); ISBN 978-0-8021-4342-6
- Driving Like Crazy (2009); ISBN 978-0-8021-1883-7
- Don't Vote! – It Just Encourages the Bastards (2010) ISBN 978-0-8021-1960-5
- Holidays in Heck (2011); ISBN 978-0-8021-1985-8
- The Baby Boom: How It Got That Way (And It Wasn't My Fault) (And I'll Never Do It Again) (2014) ISBN 978-0-8021-2197-4
- Thrown Under the Omnibus (2015); ISBN 978-0-8021-2366-4
- How the Hell Did This Happen? The Election of 2016 (2017); ISBN 978-0802126191
- None of My Business: P.J. Explains Money, Banking, Debt, Equity, Assets, Liabilities, and Why He's Not Rich and Neither Are You (2018); ISBN 978-0-8021-2848-5
- A Cry from the Far Middle: Dispatches from a Divided Land (2020); ISBN 978-0-8021-5773-7

== See also ==
- War Feels Like War, in which P. J. O'Rourke stars
