= Clive Parker =

English drummer (born 1960)

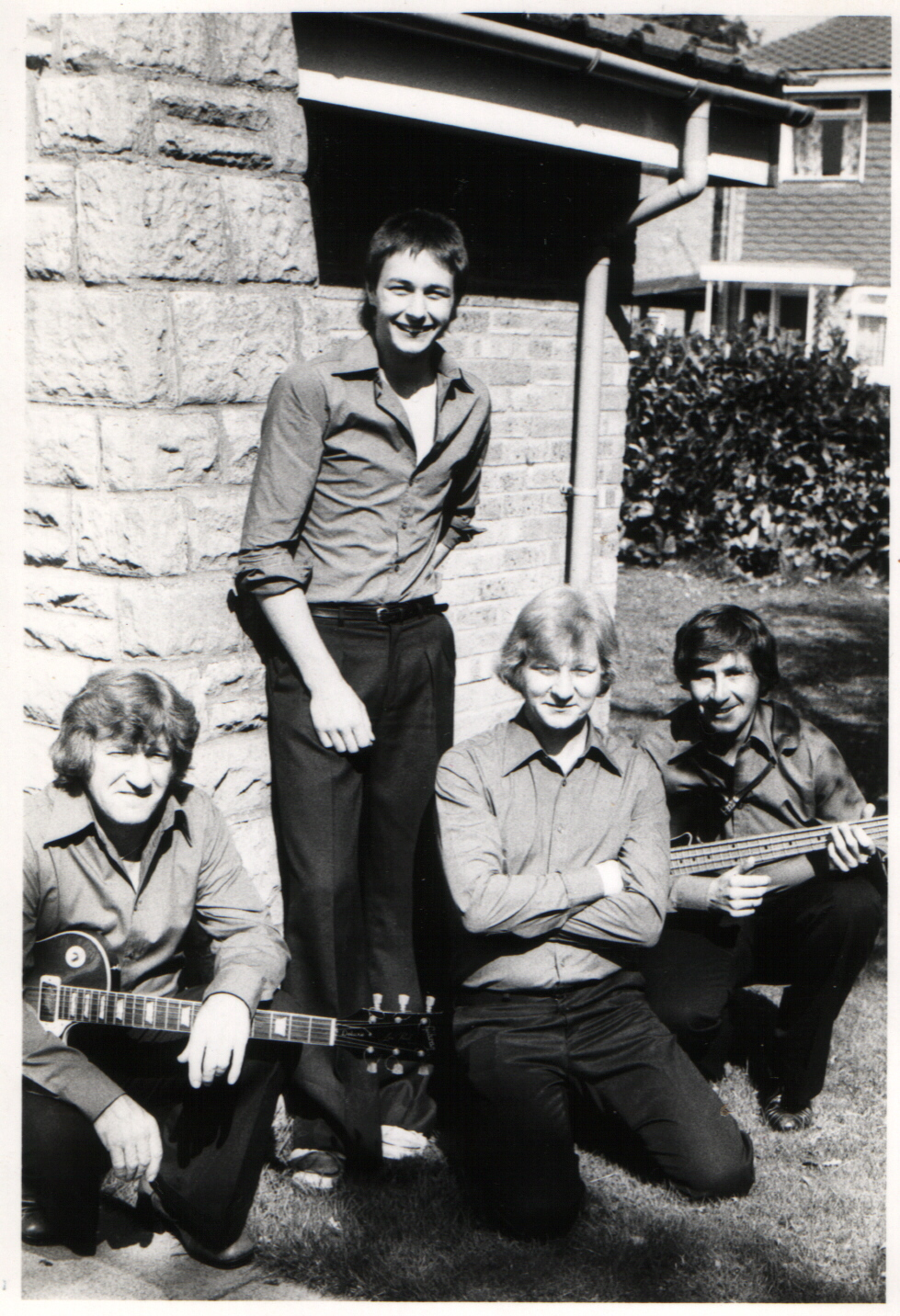
- Parker in 1975

Background information
- Also known as: CP, CP Snare
- Born: 1960 (age 65–66); Windlesham, Surrey
- Origin: Camberley, Surrey
- Labels: Rough Trade Records; A&M Records; EMI Records; Parlophone; Arcade Records; Track Records; One Little Indian; CFE; Cherry Red Records; Furry Records; Hi-Note Music (English Garden); Undiscovered Recordings

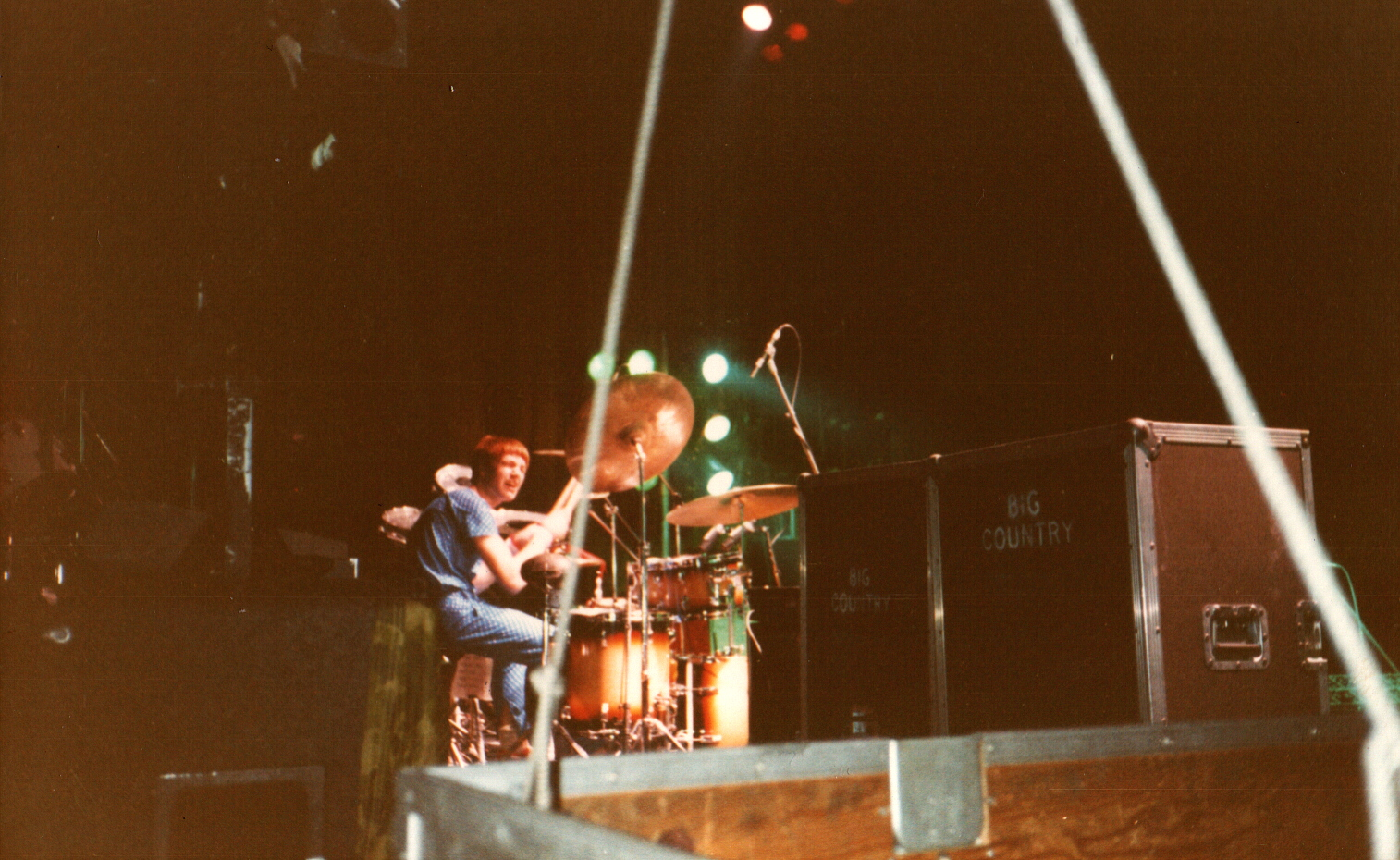
Clive Parker with Big Country 1981

Clive Parker (born 1960) also known as Clive Parker-Sharp, is an English drummer, active in the punk, post-punk and new wave genres. He was a member of the bands The Members, Spizzenergi/Athletico Spizz 80, Big Country, and Scary Thieves. He went on to play with John Moore (Jesus and Mary Chain) in The Expressway.

Parker had his own bands The Planets, Lopez & the Waveriders, Kingfishers Catch Fire, Holy Trinity, Barra (Sony-ATV/English Garden Records), and electronic guitar duo Marshall Star. He went on to production and management, forming his own small record label (Furry Records UK)

In 1992, Parker had a minor dance hit with UK soul singer, Kasie Sharp, co-writing as part of the pop dance production team One Horse Man, who were also released by Arcade Records in Europe.

== Personal background ==
Parker was born in Windlesham, Surrey. He lives in East Sussex. He is now also a writer & published author, and plays guitar and keyboards.

== Professional background ==
From the age of nine, Parker played in local show bands and working men's club's (Frimley Green;Camberley). He also joined punk rock groups in Camberley, the Home Counties, and West London circuits, often as an opening act to groups like The Members, Eddie and the Hot Rods, and others who performed at The Moonlight Club in Hampstead, and Nashville Rooms in West Kensington.

In 1980, as Athletico Spizz 80, Parker played on the album, Do a Runner, which spent five weeks on the UK Albums Chart, peaking at number 27.

In 1980, the group appeared at the Futurama Festival, along with Gary Glitter and The Psychedelic Furs.

=== Tours ===
In 1980, after signing with A&M Records, the band toured the United States with 999. During the tour, and with Solar, Spizz and Lu Edmonds from The Damned as the line up, they played the Palladium in New York City as support band to Siouxsie and the Banshees.

Spizz

Parker toured with Spizz, extensively in Europe and the United States, in support of The Clash, The Only Ones, and the Human League. Support bands for Spizz tours included Tenpole Tudor, Altered Images, Department S, and The Mo-dettes. The band played a week of sold-out shows at London's Marquee Club, with a matinee for younger fans.

Big Country

Parker toured with Big Country, playing at the Dunfermline Glen Pavilion (first ever BC gig), and dates with Alice Cooper Armed Forces tour.

Scary Thieves

Parker toured the UK with Scary Thieves and Nik Kershaw.

John Moore

Parker toured the UK with John Moore and Pop Will Eat Itself, Crazyhead, and Living Colour. Dates in the United States, in addition to solo appearances, included performances with My Bloody Valentine.

Kingfishers Catch Fire

Kingfishers Catch Fire played support to Deacon Blue, and toured the UK college circuit after a favourable showing in Melody Maker, by writer Helen Fitzgerald.

=== Literary ===
- The Box – an historical biographical novel was released by Strand Publishing in 2012.
- ConeBoy – A semi-autobiographical novel released October 2018 by Box Productions
- The Jogger – a surreal crime thriller about Stockholm Syndrome released by Box Productions in January 2021.
- African Deeds – a pictorial history of the Brem-Wilson family, that accompanies the Black Cultural Archives collection. Restoration and editing by Clive Parker-Sharp, released in 2023 by Box Productions.

Sex Drugs & Music-Hall

2013–2014; Parker toured his show, "Sex Drugs & Music-Hall", the adaptation of his book The Box, which took a skewed view of UK cultural populist history; Bingo, and Music-Hall, using spoken-word, drama, and music, with Parker playing guitar, keyboards, and wood-blocks. This was played in unusual venues, such as Museums, Libraries, Almshouses, and some Theatres.

ConeBoy

2020 on: Parker tours his ConeBoy show; musical, dramatic and spoken-word adaptations of the ConeBoy novel.

=== British Library ===
- Do A Runner – The Athletico Spizz 80 album is now housed in the British Library, as a reference tool.
- The Box is housed in The British Library as a reference tool British Library .

=== Films ===
- Urgh! A Music War. Two songs from Athletico Spizz 80.
- Unbidden. 2016 – Director; Quentin Lee. Marshall Star contribute music to this release.
- My Name Is Lenny. 2017 – Director; Ron Scalpello. The British Sports drama movie features the Athletico Spizz 80 track "Red & Black" (writer "Spizz"), along with a Marshall Star song "The Narcissist" (Parker).
- Poverty Religion Gold. Movie Documentary directed by Clive Parker (2025 Box Productions), featuring the music of Marshall Star.

== Discography ==
=== Singles ===
Spizz

- Athletico Spizz 80: June 1980 "No Room", "Spock's Missing" – Rough Trade
- Athletico Spizz 80: July 1980 "Hot Deserts", "Legal Proceedings" A&M
- Athletico Spizz 80: October 1980 "Central Park", "Central Park" (Dr. & Nurses dub version) – A&M
- The Spizzles: February 1981 "Risk", "Melancholy" – A&M
- The Spizzles: April 1981 "Dangers of Living", "Scared" – A&M

Athletico Spizz 80, BBC John Peel session, 30 April 1980 Athletico Spizz 80, BBC Mike Read session, 2 October 1980 Athletico Spizz 80 BBC Radio One In Concert, Paris Theatre London, 4th March 1980

Scary Thieves

- "Tell Me Girl" (3:48)/"Only Fascination" (3:45) (7" Parlophone, 1984)
- "Tell Me Girl" (6:37)/"Tell Me Girl" (3:48)/"Only Fascination" (3:45) (12" Parlophone, 1984)
- "Dying in Vain" (3:11)/"Behind The Lines" (4:00) (7" Parlophone, 1985)
- "Dying in Vain" (Extended Version)/"Dying in Vain" (Remix)/"Behind The Lines" (12" Parlophone, 1985)
- "The Waiting Game" (Extended Version) (6:19)/"The Waiting Game" (Radio Version) (4:13)/"Live in Another Day" (2:55) (12" Parlophone, 1985) – first pressing with limited edition poster
- "Tell Me Girl" (Extended Version) (6:29)/"Tell Me Girl" (Radio Version) (3:54)/"Only Fascination" (3:45) (12" More Disco, 1994)

BBC Radio One In Concert, Paris Theatre London, 1984

Kingfishers Catch Fire

- "Radio Kampala"/"Bella"/"Battle Scars", 12" vinyl EP, 1986; Furry/Rough Trade
- "Blushing Red"/"Never Never", vinyl limited edition double A-side, 1987; Furry/Rough Trade

Anna Palm

- "Dance" 7" vinyl, 1987; One Little Indian

39 Spies

- "Where Do We Go Now" vinyl, 1984; Bellaphon
- "Please Don't Go Away" vinyl, 1984; CFE

Kasie Sharp

- "Pulling the Strings" (mixes by Stonebridge, Sharp Boys, Kamasutra), Undiscovered, 1996

One Horse Man

- "Fuego"/"Bamba Generation", double A-side 12" vinyl, Royal/Arcade

Marshall Star

- "Get On"/"Heaven Help Me", 2000, Furry, promo CD and download only
- "Any Second Now"/"Dream On", double A-side vinyl, Furry, 2003

=== Albums ===
The Members

- Res:Erected (CD: EMI 2005) Compilation CD album released by EMI Records Ltd.

Spizz

- Do a Runner (as Athletico Spizz 80) (July 1980: A&M)
- Spikey Dream Flowers (as The Spizzles) (April 1981: A&M)
- Do a Runner (as Athletico Spizz 80) (February 2014; Furry Records UK) – "Touched", "New Species", "Intimate", "Effortless", "European Heroes", "Energy Crisis", "Red and Black", "Rhythm Inside", "Personimpersonator", "Clocks are Big", "Airships", "Brainwashing Time", "Five Year Mission", "Dangers of Living", "Robot Holiday", "Soldier Soldier", "Downtown", "Risk", "Central Park", "Melancholy", "Scared"

Big Country

- Rarities IV TRA1037 (October 2003) – "Lost Patrol", "The Crossing", "Echoes", "Wake"
- And... in the Beginning, KCF116 (December 2012) – "Lost Patrol" 4:20, Wake 4:18, "The Crossing" 4:21, "Echoes" 3:20, BBC Radio Interview 0:42, "Echoes" 6:23, "Inwards" 3:56, "Lost Patrol" 5:58, "Balcony" 5:13, "Round & Round" 6:16, "Close Action" 3:20, "Porrohman" 5:21, "The Crossing" 7:18, "Heart & Soul" 4:53, "Harvest Home" 3:57, "Angle Park" 4:14

Scary Thieves

- Scary Thieves – FURRY RECORDS April 2015 catalogue No. KCF118 – Inside the Night (3:46)/ Game of Love (4:19)/ Tell Me Girl (3:57)/ The Waiting Game (4:27)/ Halloween (3:08)/ Live in Another Day (2:55)/ Dying in Vain (3:17)/ Fascination (3:45)/ Somebody Somewhere (3:54)/ Thieves of Virtue (5:19)/ Behind the Lines (4:09)/ Dying in Vain (Single Edit) (3:25)/ The Waiting Game (Extended) (6:15)/ Dying in Vain (Extended) (5:80)/ Tell me Girl (Extended) (6:35)/ Dying in Vain (Remix) (5:08)

39 Spies

- "Doomandance" vinyl, 1984; CFE

Barra

- Eternal Magus – English Garden/Hi-Note Music, (Sony-ATV) 2002 – "Eternal Magus", "Gifts for Violet", "Gnosis", "Green Man", "Journey", "Palestine", "Seafever", "Universe", "Battlescars", "Badda", "Never Never", "Silverman", "Blushing Red", "Power of Three", "Seafever [version 2]"

Marshall Star

- Uncontrollable – Furry KCF 114, 2004; "Everybody", "Fallen Angel", "Wish I", "My Love", "Never Met a Man", "Love is All", "Dream On", "Will you (turn it up)", "Superstar", "Sweet Sensation", "Never Mind"
- Cosmos – Furry KCF 115, 2008; "Goodbye Truly", "Hopes & Aspirations", "Indiana, "The Pleasure Seekers", "A promise for Tomorrow", "The Visionary", "Slipped Away", "Keep it Up", "Seagull", "The Dotted Line", "My Last Goodbye", "Take Me"
- The Starry Messenger ‘An English Folk Album’, 12” vinyl LP, and digital release. Furry Records cat no: KCF120. 1 July 2025. Side A - (1) Rocket To The Moon (2) Home (3) The Mountain (4) Head in Your Hands (5) Something Happened Along The Way. Side B - (1) The Shape of Things to Come (2) (Give It) One More Shot (3) (With) Friends Like These (4) She Will (5) Hell’s Angel (bonus digital track – Christmas). Accompanying band Clog Dance video. Accompanying band coloured vinyl sampler.

ConeBoy

15-track Soundtrack album to ConeBoy shows released 2020, FURRY RECORDS UK, CAT No. KCF119; "The Shape of Things to Come", "Flame Hair Girl", "Down from the Mountain", "It's Christmas – Ring The Bells", "Home", "Send Delete", "Something Happened Along The Way", "Hells Angel", "She is From The City", "One in a Million", "Days of Wonder", "Not so Funny Now", "The Narcissist", "Love is All", "Down From The Mountain – Reprise"

=== Compilation albums ===
Spizz

- Gary Crowley's Punk & New Wave Vol. 2 (2023: Edsel Records / Demon Records, Double Vinyl, CD and Box Set releases)
- Spizz History (November 1983: Rough Trade)
- The Peel Sessions (February 1987: Strange Fruit)
- Unhinged (March 1994: Damaged Goods)
- Spizz Not Dead Shock: A Decade of Spizz History 1978 – '88 (May 1996: Cherry Red)
- Where's Captain Kirk (May 2002: Cherry Red)
- Urgh! A Music War (October 1989: A&M Records)
- Various – New Wave Soft Class-X 1 (AS5085: Antler Subway)
- Ausweis – Ausweis – Red And Black (Spizzenergi) (Paris – Théâtre De L'Eldorado Concert WW – 30 March 1984) (No.13: V.I.S.A)
- Various – Checkout – SpizzEnergi / Athletico Spizz 80 – (Rough Trade – RTL-11)
- Various – Foreplay – Athletico Spizz 80 – (A&M Records – SP-17128)
- Various – London Heat Wave – Athletico Spizz 80 – (A&M Records – AMP-28008)
- To The Outside Everything – A Story of UK Post Punk-1 – 1977-1981 – (Cherry Red – CRCDBOX44)
- Various – Scheisst Auf Cover-Versionen – Hier Sind Die Originale! – Raketen-Tapes – Nr.2)
- Various – Ροκ! Μουσικός Πόλεμος – Home Video Hellas – 1982)
- Various – BBC Top of the Pops – 823 – 13 August 1980/147085 S & 147086 S)
- Different Kinds of Dub – (Get Baque Records GBR 047)
- Earthling – Radar – (Cooltempo – 7243 8 33382 4 5)
- 1980 – Brand New Rage (Cherry Red 2022, cat no. AHOYBX387) 3 x CD release, compilation

Scary Thieves;

- December 84 – Previews (1984) – Tell Me Girl 12"
- Hardest Hits Volume One (1991) – The Waiting Game 12"
- Hardest Hits Volume Two (1992) – Tell Me Girl 12"
- Techno Pop 2 (Contraseña 1998) – Tell Me Girl 12"
- Deejay Time Colour (EMI – 2605951) – Tell Me Girl 12"

Kasie Sharp

- Full on House, 1997 (DCI – DCBX 104), (featuring mixes by Fat Boy Slim)
- Masters of House (DCI – DDCD 613), 1997
