= Scary Thieves =

UK musical group

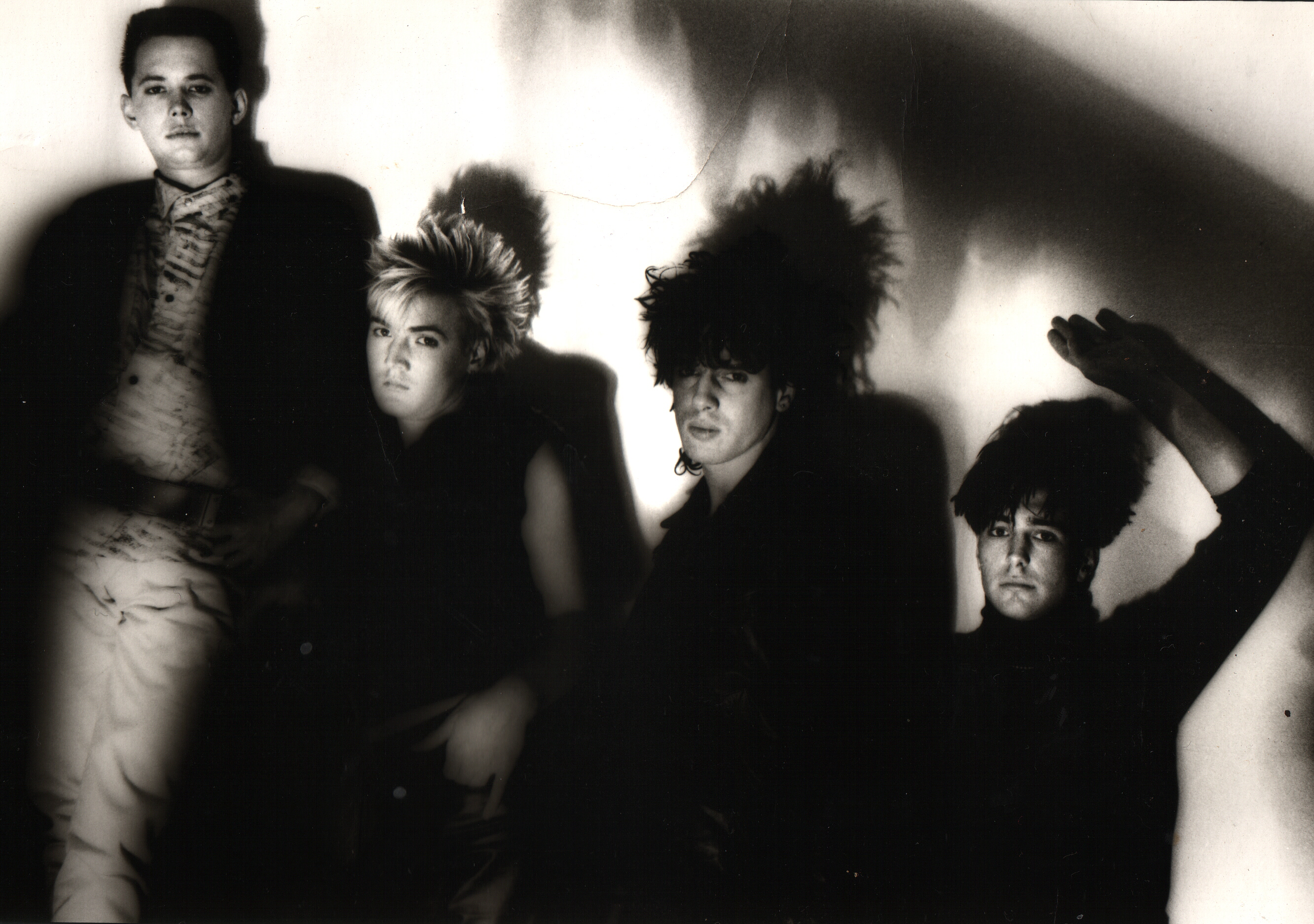
- Scary Thieves: from left; Ralph St.Rose (guitar), Chris Youdell (keyboards), Phil Manikiza (vocals), Clive Parker (drums)

Background information
- Origin: London, UK
- Genres: Synthpop, new wave
- Years active: 1984–1985
- Label: EMI
- Past members: Phil Manikiza; Chris Youdell; Clive Parker; Ralph St.Rose

Scary Thieves were a short-lived English 1980s new wave band, best known for the hits "Tell Me Girl" and "The Waiting Game". Both songs are included on the Hardest Hits compilations, which focus on obscure new wave/synth bands that have little to big cult followings.

== History ==
Scary Thieves were formed by Phil Manikiza (vocals) and Chris Youdell (keyboards) in 1983. They auditioned Clive Parker-Sharp (born Clive Parker) (drums) in a small rehearsal room in Camden Town, London, and later Ralph St. Rose (guitar). Parker was previously of bands Spizzenergi/Athletico Spizz '80 (Rough Trade/A&M Records) and Big Country. Ralph St. Rose was previously lead guitar and co-founder of the French new wave band Notre-Dame.

After a number of showcases for record companies, they signed to Parlophone Records (EMI) by manager Andy Ferguson who also managed The Undertones/Feargal Sharkey, Kevin Armstrong and Thomas Dolby. The A&R person at EMI was Hugh Stanley-Clarke. Youdell and Manikiza shared a local authority flat in Camden Town where they wrote the songs together.

The band recorded an album with Steve Nye, who was chosen for his austere electronic work with Japan. Recording the initial album was not an easy affair; some friction with Nye, and many changes of recording studio, including Abbey Road, Wessex, Martin Rushent's Genetic, Virgin's Manor Studios etc., prolonged the process. The use of electronic drums (Simmons Drums) mixed with drum machines and acoustic drums, and layers of analogue keyboards was time-consuming, and, along with Nye's fastidiousness caused tension and frustration, and the resignation of one sound engineer. The final record lacked the dynamism of the initial demos; nevertheless EMI went ahead with a set of releases and remixes, including extra productions with Scott Litt (producer of R.E.M.), and J. J. Jeczalik (Art of Noise). The band toured with Nik Kershaw building a solid 'teenybop' following, and took advantage of their striking image with a series of pop magazine interviews and photo sessions. Differences led to the sacking of Clive Parker, and the band were dropped from EMI after poor material was presented for the second album and some dates at The Marquee in London (with session musicians on bass and drums) didn't elicit the excitement of the original line-up. There is speculation that a complex relationship problem (Phil Manikiza seeing a record company executive's girl-friend) ultimately stymied the band's progress but this has not been verified by Manikiza.

The album remained unreleased, and the band split up. Parker went on to play session drums for John Moore (ex-Jesus & Mary Chain) in the Expressway (Polydor), touring the US and UK, and wrote for his own folk-rock outfit Barra (Sony-ATV/Hi-Note Records). Chris Youdell joined Presence and Then Jerico. Phil Manikiza became an in-house writer at Hit & Run Music Publishing, writing for Rozalla and others. Ralph St. Rose formed a duo and signed a short-lived recording contract.

In March 2015, A Scary Thieves album titled "Halloween" was released under Furry Records some 30 years later than the original release that was planned. It contain 10 tracks and 6 bonus mix tracks all remastered from the original tapes from 1984/85. All the videos except Waiting Game, have been restored by drummer Clive Parker's Furry Records UK label, and are available on his YouTube channel. This also includes demos, and a BBC In Concert recordings.

== Discography ==
=== Albums ===
Scary Thieves

1. "Inside the Night" (3:46)
2. "Game of Love" (4:19)
3. "Tell Me Girl" (6:37)
4. "The Waiting Game" (4:26)
5. "Halloween" (3:07)
6. "Live in Another Day" (2:55)
7. "Dying in Vain" (3:17)
8. "Fascination" (3:44)
9. "Somebody Somewhere" (3:54)
10. "Thieves of Virtue" (5:18)

=== Singles ===
- 1984: "Tell Me Girl" (3:48)/"Only Fascination" (3:45) (7", Parlophone)
- 1984: "Tell Me Girl" (6:37)/"Tell Me Girl" (3:48)/"Only Fascination" (3:45) (12", Parlophone)
- 1985: "Dying in Vain" (3:11)/"Behind the Lines" (4:00) (7", Parlophone)
- 1985: "Dying in Vain" (Extended Version)/"Dying in Vain" (Remix)/"Behind the Lines" (12", Parlophone)
- 1985: "The Waiting Game" (Extended Version) (6:19)/"The Waiting Game" (Radio Version) (4:13)/"Live in Another Day" (2:55) (12", Parlophone) — first pressing with limited edition poster
- 1994: "Tell Me Girl" (Extended Version) (6:29)/"Tell Me Girl" (Radio Version) (3:54)/"Only Fascination" (3:45) (12", More Disco)

=== Compilation appearances ===
- 1984: December 84 - Previews (DMC) — "Tell Me Girl" 12"
- 1991: Hardest Hits Volume One (SPG) — "The Waiting Game" 12"
- 1992: Hardest Hits Volume Two (SPG) — "Tell Me Girl" 12"
- 1998: Techno Pop 2 (Contraseña) — "Tell Me Girl" 12"
