= 1980 - The Choice Is Yours =

Studio album by The Members
- Released: 1980
- Studio: Farmyard Studios, Little Chalfont, Buckinghamshire
- Genre: Punk rock
- Label: Virgin
- Producer: Rupert Hine

The Members chronology
At the Chelsea Nightclub (1979)	1980 - The Choice Is Yours (1980)	Uprhythm, Downbeat (1982)

Professional ratings
Review scores
Source	Rating
Allmusic	link
Smash Hits	7½/10

1980 - The Choice Is Yours is the second album by the British punk rock band The Members, released in 1980.

== Track listing ==
1. "The Ayatollah Harmony" (Nigel Bennett)
2. "Goodbye to the Job" (Nick Tesco, Jean-Marie Carroll)
3. "Physical Love" (Nicky Tesco, Chris Payne)
4. "Romance" (Jean-Marie Carroll)
5. "Brian Was" (Jean-Marie Carroll)
6. "Flying Again" (Chris Payne)
7. "Normal People" (Nick Tesco, Jean-Marie Carroll)
8. "Police Car" (Larry Wallis)
9. "Clean Men" (Nick Tesco, Jean-Marie Carroll)
10. "Muzak Machine" (Chris Payne)
11. "Gang War" (Nick Tesco, Jean-Marie Carroll)

(2005 CD Bonus Track)

1. "GLC" (Adrian Lillywhite, Gary Baker, Nicky Tesco, Steve Morley)
2. "Killing Time" (Jean-Marie Carroll, Nicky Tesco)
3. "Ballad of John & Martin" (Chris Payne, Jean-Marie Carroll, Nicky Tesco)
4. "Disco Oui Oui" (The Members)
5. "Love in a Lift" - soul version (Chris Payne, Nicky Tesco)
6. "Rat up a Drainpipe" - new version (Chris Payne)

== Personnel ==
The Members

- Nicky Tesco - lead vocals
- Nigel Bennett - lead guitar, vocals
- Jean-Marie Carroll - guitar, vocals
- Chris Payne - bass, vocals
- Adrian Lillywhite - drums, percussion

with:

- Joe Jackson - piano
- Rupert Hine - keyboards
- Albie Donnelly - saxophone
- Rico Rodriguez - trombone
- Dick Cuthell - flugelhorn

Technical

- John Brand - engineer
- Keith Breeden, Malcolm Garrett - sleeve
