= Uprhythm, Downbeat =

Studio album by The Members
- Released: 1982
- Genre: Punk rock
- Label: Arista
- Producer: Martin Rushent, The Members, Dave Allen

The Members chronology
| 1980 - The Choice Is Yours (1980) | Uprhythm, Downbeat (1982) | InGrrLand (2012) |

Professional ratings
Review scores
| Source | Rating |
|---|---|
| Allmusic | 3/5 stars |

Uprhythm, Downbeat is the third album from punk rock band The Members. It includes the band's most successful single in the U.S., "Working Girl", and the single "Radio", which was a major chart hit in Australia. Although it was released in 1982 in the United States, the record was unavailable in the band's native Britain until 1983, when it was released as Going West by Albion Records.

== Track listing ==
Note: Following is the track listing for the 2006 remastered version of the album. The original album's version of the track "Radio" (titled "Radiodub" on the original) is actually over two minutes longer than the one on this remastered version.

1. "Working Girl" (Nick Tesco, Jean-Marie Carroll) 4:09
2. "The Family" (Jean-Marie Carroll) 4:11
3. "The Model" (Ralf Hütter, Karl Bartos, Emil Schult) 5:10
4. "Chairman of the Board" (Nick Tesco, Payne, Jean-Marie Carroll) 4:05
5. "Boys Like Us" (Nick Tesco, Adrian Lillywhite, Chris Payne, Jean-Marie Carroll, Simon Lloyd, Steve Thompson, Nigel Bennett) 4:11
6. "Going West" (Chris Payne) 4:10
7. "Radio" (Nigel Bennett) 5:52
8. "Fire (in My Heart)" (Nick Tesco, Adrian Lillywhite, Chris Payne, Jean-Marie Carroll, Simon Lloyd, Steve Thompson, Nigel Bennett) 4:19
9. "You and Me Against the World" (Nick Tesco, Adrian Lillywhite, Chris Payne, Jean-Marie Carroll, Simon Lloyd, Steve Thompson, Nigel Bennett) 4:22
10. "We the People" (Nick Tesco, Chris Payne) 5:10

2006 CD Bonus Track

1. "Working Girl" (single version)
2. "Holiday in Tanganika"
3. "Every Day is Just a Holiday"
4. "If You Can't Stand Up"
5. "At the Arcade"
6. "Membership"

== Personnel ==
The Members

- Nicky Tesco - vocals
- Jean-Marie Carroll - guitar, keyboards, backing vocals
- Nigel Bennett - guitar, keyboards, backing vocals
- Chris Payne - bass, backing vocals
- Adrian Lillywhite - drums, percussion
- Steve "Rudi" Thompson - tenor saxophone
- Simon Lloyd - keyboards, Fairlight programming, trumpet, alto and tenor saxophone

with:

- Dave Allen - Roland Mc4 and Mc8, Fairlight programming
- Martin Rushent - Fairlight programming
- Howard Fitzson - art direction, design
- Dave Stetson - cover photography
