= At the Chelsea Nightclub =

Studio album by The Members
- Released: April 1979
- Recorded: January 1979
- Studio: The Town House, London; The Music Centre, Wembley
- Genre: Punk rock
- Length: 42:04 (original); 73:47 (2005 reissue)
- Label: Virgin
- Producer: Steve Lillywhite

The Members chronology
At the Chelsea Nightclub (1979)	1980 - The Choice Is Yours (1980)

Professional ratings
Review scores
Source	Rating
Allmusic	4.5/5 stars
Smash Hits	7/10

At the Chelsea Nightclub is The Members' first album, released in 1979.

== Reception ==
Smash Hits said, "the Members are supposed to be one of the hottest post-punk rock bands around, but I have my doubts. They're disposable pop rather than committed rock, though their cocky soccer-crowd style has some good clever touches. AllMusic called it, "the only Members album worth owning".

== Track listing ==
1. "Electricity" (Jean-Marie Carroll)
2. "Sally" (Gary Baker)
3. "Soho-A-Go-Go" (Chris Payne, Nicky Tesco)
4. "Don't Push" (Adrian Lillywhite, Nicky Tesco, Steve Morley)
5. "Solitary Confinement" (Jean-Marie Carroll, Nicky Tesco)
6. "Frustrated, Bagshot" (Jean-Marie Carroll, Nicky Tesco)
7. "Stand Up and Spit" (Jean-Marie Carroll, Nicky Tesco)
8. "The Sound of the Suburbs" (Jean-Marie Carroll, Nicky Tesco)
9. "Phone-in Show" (Jean-Marie Carroll, Nicky Tesco)
10. "Love in a Lift" (Chris Payne, Nicky Tesco)
11. "Chelsea Nightclub" (Jean-Marie Carroll) recorded at a cinema in Hammersmith, December 3, 1978

=== 2005 CD bonus tracks ===
12. "Fear on the Streets" (Streets compilation)
13. "Solitary Confinement" (Stiff single version)
14. "Rat up a Drainpipe" (Stiff single version)
15. "The Sound of the Suburbs" (single version)
16. "Handling the Big Jets"
17. "Offshore Banking Business" - 7" single version (Jean-Marie Carroll) produced by Vic Coppersmith-Heaven
18. "Solitary Confinement" (Virgin single version)
19. "Offshore Banking Business/Pennies in the Pound" (12" version)

== Personnel ==
The Members

- Nicky Tesco - lead vocals
- Nigel Bennett - lead guitar, vocals
- Jean-Marie Carroll - guitar, vocals
- Chris Payne - bass, vocals
- Adrian Lillywhite - drums, percussion
- Steve "Rudi" Thompson - saxophone

Technical

- Alan Perkins, Paul "Groucho" Smykle (track: B2), Pete Wandless - engineer
- Malcolm Garrett - artwork
