= Where's Captain Kirk? =

1979 single by Spizzenergi

Song by Spizzenergi
- Language: English
- Released: December 1979
- Genre: Punk rock
- Length: 2:17
- Label: Rough Trade Records
- Songwriters: Spizz; Mark Coalfield

Music video
- "Where's Captain Kirk" on YouTube

"Where's Captain Kirk?" is a 1979 single released by punk/new wave band Spizzenergi. It was released on the Rough Trade Records label and spent seven weeks at the top of the UK Indie Chart, but failed to enter the UK singles chart.

== Background ==
The single was the fourth to be released by the band Spizzenergi, who had previously been known as Spizzoil. The song was written by lead singer Spizz and keyboard player Mark Coalfield. The single reached the number one spot on the UK Indie Chart and stayed there for seven weeks. "Where's Captain Kirk?" was the first number one single on the chart, which had just been established.

In July 1980 Record Mirror revealed that the single sold more than 60,000 units without ever charting.

Following the success of "Where's Captain Kirk?", which refers to captain James T. Kirk of the Star Trek fictional universe, two further Star Trek related songs were released by the band. "Spock's Missing" followed six months later and "Five Year Mission (Featuring the Return of Spock)" was released on a later album. A Portuguese single released in 1981 had "Where's Captain Kirk?" on the a-side and "Spock's Missing" on the b-side. The single was later re-released by Spizz as a solo record in 1987. Both versions of the song were included on the compilation album Spizz Not Dead Shock, while the original is also on Spizzhistory.

London Punkharmonic Orchestra have included a recording on the album Classical Punk.

The single also lent the name to the best of collection for Spizzenergi. The single is included on the album both as the first song, and again as the twentieth with a live version recorded at the Holiday in the Sun punk festival.

== Critical reception ==
During the first week of the first release Melody Maker named it its single of the week. Following release, the single was included in the NME Writers 100 Best Indie Singles Ever (1992) and more than two decades after its release, it was included at number 29 in Mojo magazine's list of the best punk rock singles of all time.

Jason Heller reviewed "Where's Captain Kirk" for Tor.com in 2010 as part of his series entitled "Frequency Rotation" which looked at science fiction related music. He called it a "loving (if kitsch-happy) homage to Star Trek—and especially its square-jawed, twinkly-eyed, ass-kicking hero." On a Star Trek television special, Radio One DJ John Peel, in reference to the song, said that Spizzenergi recorded "the only Star Trek tribute worthy of the Enterprise's jukebox". It was also placed by listeners at No. 40 in his 1980 Festive Fifty.

== Credits and personnel ==
Credits taken from the Spizzenergi official website.

- Spizz – vocals
- Jim Solar (James Little) – bass guitar
- Dave Scott – guitar
- Mark Coalfield (Mark Stephens) – keyboards
- Brian B. Benzine (Bryn Burrows) – drums

== Charts ==
Chart (1979–80)	Peak position
UK Indie Chart	1
