= CFE =

CFE may refer to:

== Education ==
- Campaign for Fiscal Equity, a non-profit organization for funding education in New York City
- Certified Fraud Examiner, a designation awarded by the Association of Certified Fraud Examiners
- Colegio Franco Español, a school in Mexico City
- Common Final Examination, the final examination for Chartered Professional Accountant students in Canada
- Curriculum for Excellence, the national curriculum for Scottish schools

== Military ==
- Canadian Forces Europe
- Central Fighter Establishment, a Royal Air Force formation
- Conventional Forces in Europe, two NATO/Warsaw Pact treaties:
  - Treaty on Conventional Armed Forces in Europe, established limits on conventional military equipment in Europe
  - Adapted Conventional Armed Forces in Europe Treaty, signed on November 19, 1999, during Istanbul summit

== Other organizations ==
- CFE (Belgium), a Belgian construction company
- CFE Company, producer of the CFE738 turbofan engine
- Chaco For Ever, an Argentine football club
- Chicago Board Options Exchange Futures Exchange (CFE)
- Chicago, Fort Wayne and Eastern Railroad, railroad service (reporting mark)
- Clermont-Ferrand Auvergne Airport (IATA airport code), airport serving French city of Clermont-Ferrand
- Comisión Federal de Electricidad, the Mexican state-owned electric power utility
- Confédération Fiscale Européenne, an organization of European tax advisers and their national organizations
- Council of Five Elders, a government council of feudal Japan

== Other uses ==
- Constitution for the Federation of Earth (CFE), a world constitution
- CFE Arena, arena in Orlando, Florida, University of Central Florida
- Capcom Fighting Evolution, a 2004 video game from Capcom
- Common Firmware Environment, a bootloader developed by Broadcom for their system-on-a-chip products
- Compiler frontend, the part of a computer compiler that verifies syntax and semantics
- Continued fraction expansion, the representation of a number or function by a continued fraction
- BA CityFlyer, a subsidiary of British Airways (ICAO code)
