= The Members =

British punk rock band

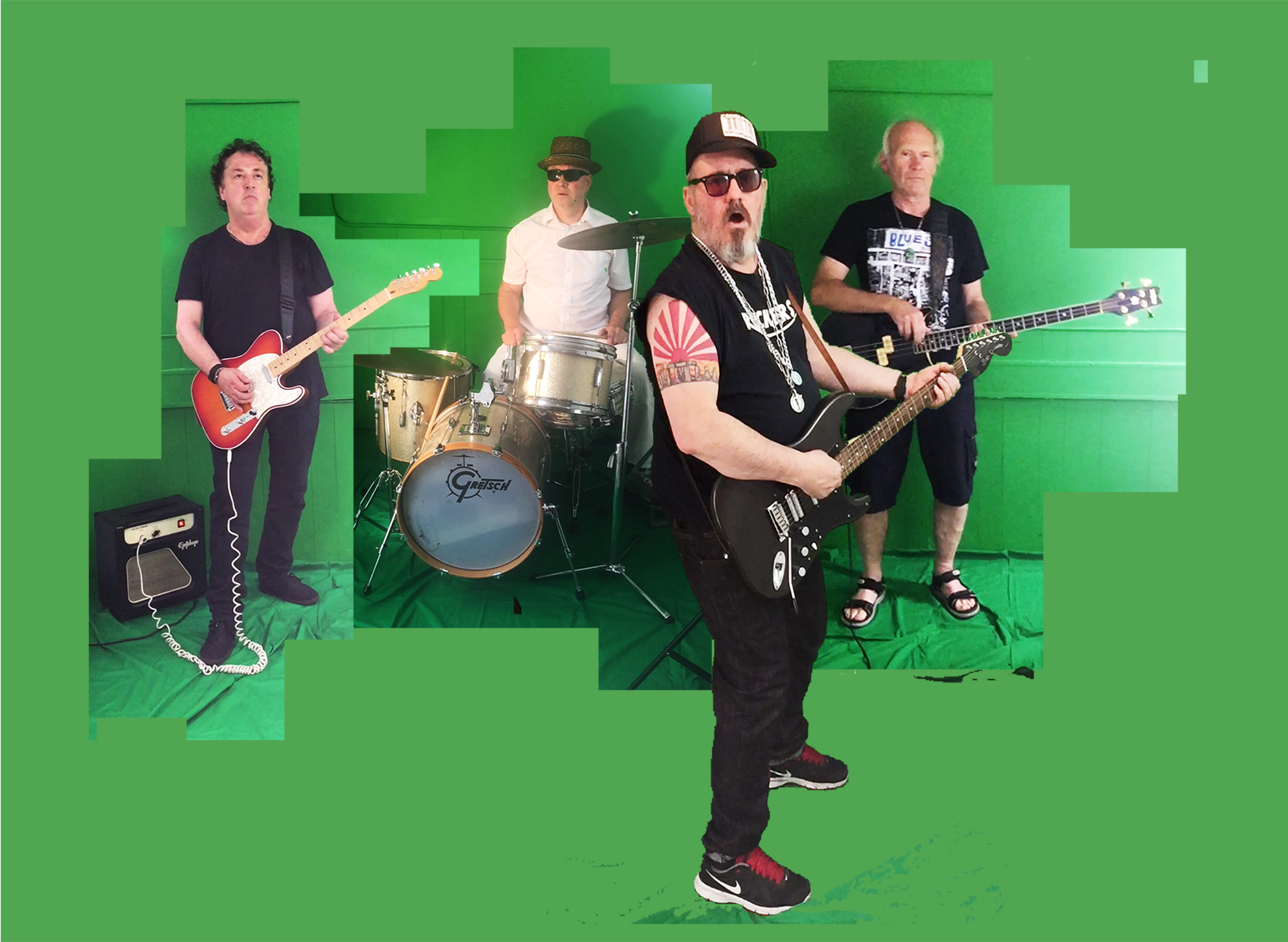
- The Members in London, 2015

Background information
- Origin: Camberley, Surrey, England
- Genres: Punk rock
- Years active: 1976–1983, 2007–present
- Labels: Stiff, Virgin, Arista
- Members: JC Carroll; Chris Payne; Nick Cash; Calle Engelmarc
- Past members: Rat Scabies; Nicky Tesco; Adrian Lillywhite; Nigel Bennett; Paddy Carroll; Gary Baker; Steve Morley; Clive Parker; Steve Maycock; Rudi Thompson; Simon Lloyd; Chuck Sabo; Adam Maitland; Paul Gray
- Website: theMembers.co.uk

The Members are a British punk band that originated in Camberley, Surrey, England. In the UK, they are best known for their single "The Sound of the Suburbs", reaching No. 12 in the UK Singles Chart in 1979, and in Australia, "Radio" which reached No. 5 in 1982.

== Career ==
The Members were formed by lyricist Nicky Tesco (Nick Lightowlers) in 1976, through an invited audition at a recording studio at Tooley Street, London. The original personnel, with Tesco (vocals), was Gary Baker (guitar), and Steve Morley (bass guitar), initially with Steve Maycock then Clive Parker (drums). Morley and Parker were later replaced by Chris Payne and Adrian Lillywhite.

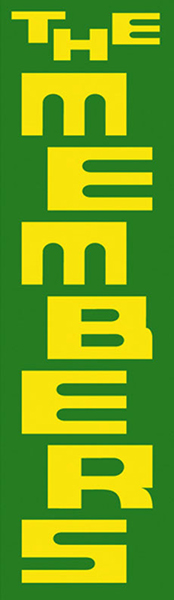
Official logo of the Members

In 1976, the band performed for their first gigs in London pubs. In that year, composer Jean Marie Carroll (aka JC Carroll) joined the band to complement Tesco's lyrics. The Members had recorded a number of songs, but the first released recording was "Fear on the Streets", produced by Lillywhite's brother Steve Lillywhite. This song was included on the first record released by the Beggars Banquet label, who made the punk compilation Streets (1977). The song-writing collaboration between Tesco and Carroll moved The Members' sound towards an incorporation of reggae, shown in the first single released for Stiff Records, "Solitary Confinement", produced by Larry Wallis. Following these releases, the band personnel became Tesco (vocals), Carroll (vocals and guitar), Nigel Bennett (guitar), Payne (bass) and Lillywhite (drums).

In 1978/79, the Members continued to play the London pub and club circuit, became a feature in the music press and were championed by John Peel. They signed to Virgin Records in 1978, for which label they recorded "The Sound of the Suburbs", again produced by Steve Lillywhite. This became The Members' biggest chart success and their best-known song in the UK. However, the follow-up single, "Offshore Banking Business", a reggae tune written by Carroll, based on his experiences working in offshore banking at the private bank Coutts, did not achieve the same popularity. A version of "Offshore Banking Business" was recorded for the early 1980s film Urgh! A Music War, produced by Michael White, and distributed by Filmways and Lorimar Productions.

The Members' first album, At the Chelsea Nightclub, was followed by a second for Virgin, 1980 – The Choice Is Yours. Augmented by saxophonists Steve (Rudi) Thomson and Simon Lloyd (the latter of whom also provided horns and additional keyboards), the group recorded what would turn out to be their final album. This last album was first issued in the US as Uprhythm, Downbeat in 1982, and it surfaced in the UK a year later, with a new title called Going West. The album featured the singles "Radio," which made no. 5 in Australia, and Working Girl, the music video for which gave the band exposure in North America via MTV.

The band broke up in 1983, when Tesco left the band after the last tour of the US. JC Carroll formed the UK fashion house, The Dispensary, with his then wife Sophy Lynn and began working on film soundtracks, most notably with film producer Stephen Malit and director Julien Temple. Lillywhite went on to join the band King in the mid-1980s in time for their second album. Lloyd soon joined the Australian band Icehouse, remaining with them for their international smash hits "Electric Blue" and "Crazy". In 1989, Tesco appeared in Leningrad Cowboys Go America, written and directed by Aki Kaurismäki, a film about a fictional Russian rock band touring the US. This fictional band then toured as an actual band, and recorded the Tesco song "Thru the Wire". Kaurismäki directed a video for "Thru the Wire", featuring Tesco. As well as working as a music journalist for the magazine Music Week, Tesco became a commentator on new releases for BBC 6 Music's "Roundtable".

== Reunion incarnation ==
In 2008, the original line up of the band reformed to play two concerts, then a line up of Carroll, Payne and Nick Cash resumed touring. In 2009, a new single "International Financial Crisis" (a re-write of "Offshore Banking Business") was released, recorded by Tesco, Carroll, Payne and Bennett, with artwork by the original Members' album sleeve designer, Malcolm Garrett. This line up played Glastonbury and Isle of Wight Festivals. The Members line-up of Carroll, Payne and Rat Scabies (drums) performed from 2010 to 2013, playing over 90 shows including three European tours and New Zealand and Australian tours. Nick Cash rejoined the band in 2014.

In March 2012, the Members released their fourth studio album, InGrrLand, featuring Carroll, Payne, Bennett, Cash and Rat Scabies. In December 2013, Nigel Bennett rejoined the Members. In 2014, the Members (comprising Carroll, Bennett and Cash), mounted a 23-date tour of the US; Carroll on bass guitar and lead vocals, Bennett on lead guitar, and Cash on drums. This was the band's first tour of the US for 32 years.

In 2015, the band began work on their fifth studio album in studios in London and West Byfleet featuring a nucleus of Carroll, Cash, Payne and Bennett together with guest appearances from Guy Pratt and guitarist Steve Brookes. One Law, released in early 2016, was produced by Carroll, and received reviews in Louder Than War, The Aberdeen Voice, Record Collector and Vive Le Rock.

In 2021, the band released their seventh studio album Bedsitland and JC Carroll's definitive story of the band, Still Annoying the Neighbours, was published.

Since reforming the Members have performed all over the world; and apart from a break for the COVID pandemic, they continue to perform.

On 26 February 2022, it was announced that Tesco had died, at the age of 67. The BBC's Johnnie Walker and JC Carroll paid tribute to Tesco on the Sounds of the 70's BBC radio show.

== Line-ups ==
1976	1976	1977	1977
Nicky Tesco – vocals; Gary Baker – guitars; Steve Morley – bass; Steve Maycock – drums, percussion	Nicky Tesco – vocals; Gary Baker – guitars; Steve Morley – bass; Clive Parker – drums, percussion	Nicky Tesco – vocals; Gary Baker – guitars; Steve Morley – bass; Adrian Lillywhite – drums, percussion	Nicky Tesco – lead vocals; Gary Baker – guitars; Steve Morley – bass; Adrian Lillywhite – drums, percussion; JC Carroll – guitars, backing vocals
1977 – 1978	1978 – 1981	1981	1981 – 1983
Nicky Tesco – lead vocals; Gary Baker – guitars; Adrian Lillywhite – drums, percussion; JC Carroll – guitars, backing vocals; Chris Payne – bass, backing vocals	Nicky Tesco – lead vocals; Adrian Lillywhite – drums, percussion; JC Carroll – guitars, backing vocals; Chris Payne – bass, backing vocals; Nigel Bennett – guitars, backing vocals	Nicky Tesco – lead vocals; Adrian Lillywhite – drums, percussion; JC Carroll – guitars, backing vocals; Chris Payne – bass, backing vocals; Nigel Bennett – guitars, backing vocals; Steve "Rudi" Thompson – horns; Adam Maitland – horns	Nicky Tesco – lead vocals; Adrian Lillywhite – drums, percussion; JC Carroll – guitars, backing vocals; Chris Payne – bass, backing vocals; Nigel Bennett – guitars, backing vocals; Steve "Rudi" Thompson – horns; Simon Lloyd – keyboards, horns
1983	1983 – 2007	2007	2008
Nicky Tesco – lead vocals; JC Carroll – guitars, backing vocals; Chris Payne – bass, backing vocals; Nigel Bennett – guitars, backing vocals; Steve "Rudi" Thompson – horns; Simon Lloyd – keyboards, horns; Chuck Sabo – drums, percussion	Disbanded	Nicky Tesco – lead vocals; Adrian Lillywhite – drums, percussion; JC Carroll – guitars, backing vocals; Chris Payne – bass, backing vocals; Nigel Bennett – guitars, backing vocals	JC Carroll – guitars, lead vocals; Chris Payne – bass, backing vocals; Nick Cash – drums, percussion
2009	2009 – 2010	2010 – 2013	2013 – December 2013
Nicky Tesco – lead vocals; JC Carroll – guitars, backing vocals; Chris Payne – bass, backing vocals; Nick Cash – drums, percussion	JC Carroll – guitars, lead vocals; Chris Payne – bass, backing vocals; Nick Cash – drums, percussion	JC Carroll – guitars, lead vocals; Chris Payne – bass, backing vocals; Rat Scabies – drums, percussion	JC Carroll – guitars, lead vocals; Chris Payne – bass, backing vocals; Rat Scabies – drums, percussion; Steve "Rudi" Thompson – horns
December 2013 – 2014	2014	2014	2014
JC Carroll – guitars, lead vocals; Chris Payne – bass, backing vocals; Nick Cash – drums, percussion; Nigel Bennett – guitars, backing vocals	JC Carroll – guitars, lead vocals; Nick Cash – drums, percussion; Nigel Bennett – guitars, backing vocals; Calle Engelmarc – bass, backing vocals	JC Carroll – bass, lead vocals; Nick Cash – drums, backing vocals, percussion; Nigel Bennett – guitars, backing vocals	JC Carroll – guitars, lead vocals; Nick Cash – drums, backing vocals, percussion; Chris Payne – bass, backing vocals
2014 – 2015	2016	2016	2016
JC Carroll – guitars, lead vocals; Nick Cash – drums, backing vocals, percussion; Chris Payne – bass, backing vocals; Paddy Carroll – guitars, backing vocals	JC Carroll – guitars, lead vocals; Nick Cash – drums, backing vocals, percussion; Chris Payne – bass, backing vocals; Nigel Bennett – guitars, backing vocals	JC Carroll – guitars, lead vocals; Chris Payne – bass, backing vocals; Dan Heatly – drums, backing vocals, percussion	JC Carroll – guitars, lead vocals; Calle Engelmarc – bass, backing vocals; Nick Cash – drums, percussion
2017 – 2020	2020 – 2022	2022 (199 club – 45 years reunion)	2022 – present
JC Carroll – guitars, lead vocals; Calle Engelmarc – guitars, backing vocals; Nick Cash – drums, percussion; Chris Payne – bass, backing vocals	JC Carroll – guitars, vocals; Nick Cash – drums, percussion; Chris Payne – bass, vocals	JC Carroll – guitars, vocals; Nick Cash – drums, percussion; Chris Payne – bass, vocals; Adrian Lillywhite – drums, percussion; Steve "Rudi" Thompson – horns; Nigel Bennett – guitars, backing vocals; Calle Engelmarc – guitars, backing vocals; Paddy Carroll – guitars, backing vocals	JC Carroll – guitars, vocals; Nick Cash – drums, percussion; Chris Payne – bass, vocals

== Discography ==
=== Albums ===
Year	Title	UK	Label
1979	At the Chelsea Nightclub	45	Stiff/Virgin
1980	1980 – The Choice Is Yours	-	Virgin
1982	Uprhythm, Downbeat	-	Virgin
1995	Sound of the Suburbs (Best Of)	-	Virgin
2010	Live in Berlin	-	Smash The System
2012	Ingrrland	-	AngloCentric
2016	One Law	-	AngloCentric – Cadiz Music
2016	At The Luton Hat Factory	-	AngloCentric
2018	Greatest Hits (all the Singles)	-	AngloCentric – Cadiz Music
2019	Version	-	Cleopatra Records
2019	InGrrLand (vinyl edition)	-	Cleopatra Records
2021	Bedsitland (vinyl, CD, Digital )	-	AngloCentric Records
2024	Greetings From Knowhere	-	AngloCentric Records
2025	At The Coach House - The Original Studio Tapes	-	AngloCentric Records
2025	At The End Of Term - The Lost Masters	-	AngloCentric Records

=== Singles ===
Year	Title	UK	UK Indie	US Main	AUS
1979	"Solitary Confinement"	-	-	-	-
1979	"The Sound of the Suburbs"	12	-	-	-
1979	"Offshore Banking Business"	31	-	-	-
1979	"Killing Time"	-	-	-	-
1980	"Romance"	-	-	-	-
1980	"Flying Again"	-	-	-	-
1981	"Working Girl"	114	41	34	-
1982	"Radio"	-	-	-	5
2009	"International Financial Crisis"	-	-	-	-
2011	"New English Blues"	-	-	-	-
2015	"(I Love my)English Girls"	-	-	-	-
2016	"Emotional Triggers c/w Apathy in the UK"	-	-	-	-
2016	"Incident at Surbiton (3 Mixes)"	-	-	-	-
2018	"Smartphone Junkie c/w Non. Je ne Regrette Rein"	-	-	-	-
2019	"When U were mine c/w Ever Fallen in Love in Love"	-	-	-	-

=== Compilation appearances ===
- Streets (Beggars Banquet 1977 – Track: "Fear on the Streets")
- The Moonlight Tapes (Danceville Records 1977 – Track: "Rat Up a Drainpipe")
- The Sound of the Suburbs (Columbia Records MOOD18 (1991) – Track: "The Sounds of the Suburbs")
