= Spizzenergi =

English punk/new wave band

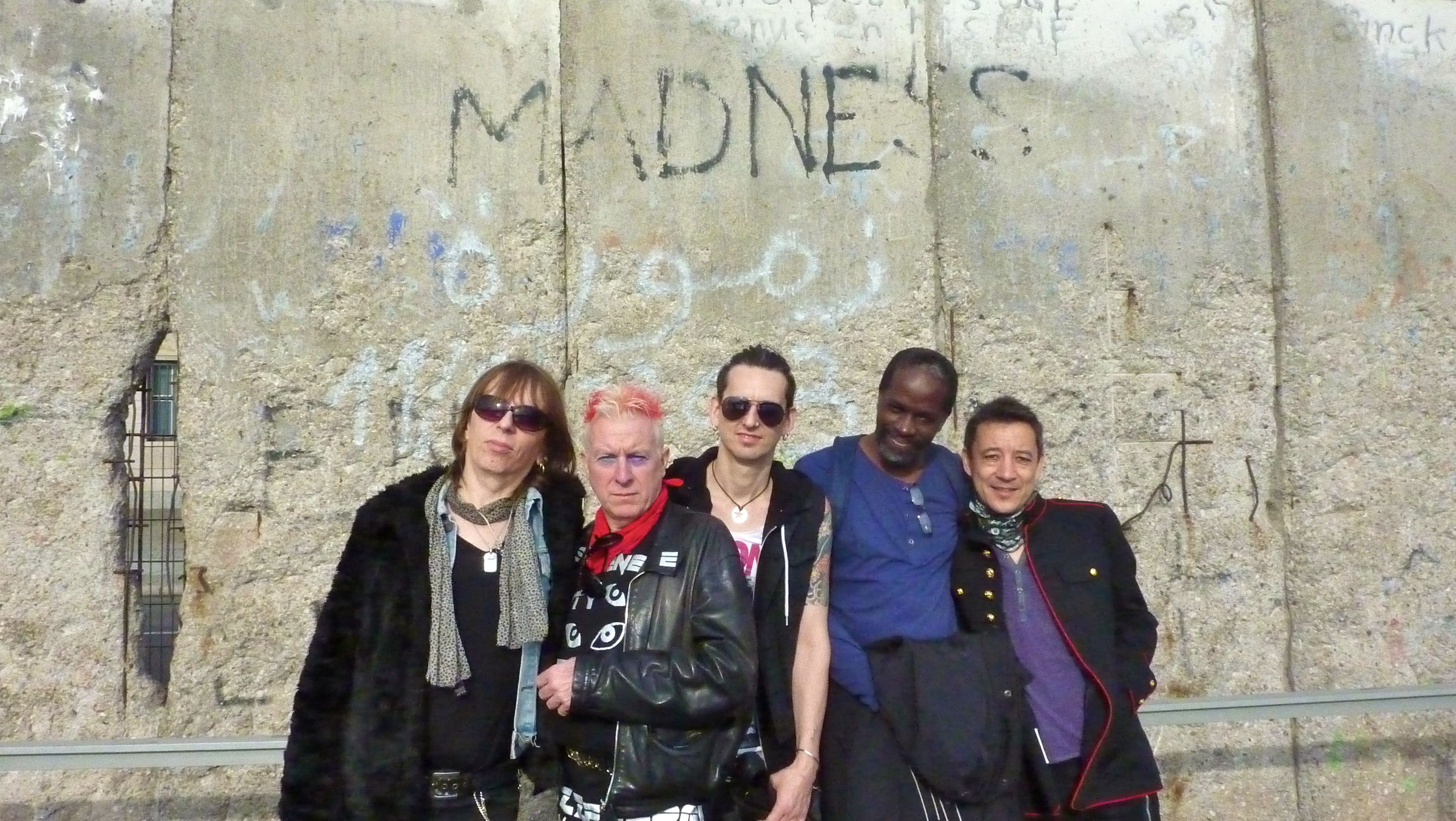
- The band in 2013 (l-r): Luca Comencini, Spizz, Ben Lawson, Jeff Walker, Phil Ross

Background information
- Also known as: Spizz Oil; Athletico Spizz 80; The Spizzles; Spizzenergi 2 SpizzSexual
- Origin: England
- Genres: Punk rock, Post Punk, new wave
- Years active: 1979–1982, 1987–1988, 2007–present
- Labels: Rough Trade Records; A&M Records; Hobo Railway; Plastic Head; Holy Dotage Records
- Members: Spizz; Alan Galaxy; Luca Comencini; Phil Ross; Ben Lawson
- Past members: Pete Petrol; Mark Coalfield; Jim Solar; Clive Parker; Brian B. Benzine (real name Bryn Burrows); Dave Scott; Simon Kinder; Matt Broughton; Lu Edmonds; Mark Ferda; Tony Piper; CS Gas; Jeff Walker; Suresh Singh
- Website: www.spizzenergi.com

Spizzenergi are an English punk/new wave band led by vocalist/guitarist Spizz (real name Kenneth Spiers, born Solihull 1959). Formed in the late 1970s, the band changed its name every year, subsequent names including Athletico Spizz 80, Spizzoil and the Spizzles.

They are notable as the first band to top the newly created UK Indie Chart early in 1980 with the single "Where's Captain Kirk?" More than two decades after its release, it was included in Mojo magazine's list of the best punk rock singles of all time.

== Spizz's early years / Spizzoil ==
Spizz attended Arden School, Knowle, near Solihull, a comprehensive school in the West Midlands, and was inspired by the burgeoning punk rock movement. After a Siouxsie and the Banshees gig at Barbarella's in Birmingham, he jumped on stage and sang, leading to a recording deal. He was already performing (solo) by 1977. Spizz soon got together with like-minded guitarist Pete Petrol (real name Pete O'Dowd), with whom he released a few singles during the height of punk's popularity. In 1978 Palmolive, drummer with the Slits, joined the band, then named Spizzoil, for a few gigs.

The band supported Siouxsie and the Banshees on tour in 1978 in the UK.

Their lineup in late 1979 consisted of Spizz on vocals and guitar, Mark Coalfield on keyboard and vocals, Dave Scott on guitar, Jim Solar on bass guitar and Hero Shima on drums. With a distinctively new wave sound, as Spizzenergi they became the first number one band on the newly formed UK Indie Singles Chart in January 1980. BBC Radio 1 disc jockey John Peel would later describe "Where's Captain Kirk?" as "the only Star Trek tribute worth of the Enterprise's jukebox".

This lineup continued as Athletico Spizz 80, gaining a considerable following. They became the only band to sell out the Marquee Club for five consecutive nights. "Where's Captain Kirk?" was featured in the 1981 live music film Urgh! A Music War. The band released an album entitled Do a Runner on A&M Records, to mixed reviews.

When Lu Edmonds joined the lineup in 1981, the band changed its name to the Spizzles. The group released a record called Spikey Dream Flowers, which cemented the group's sonic image as science-fiction weirdos. Two final 1982 singles, this time as Spizzenergi 2, "Megacity 3" and "Jungle Fever", were the swan song of Spizz in the 1980s. By 1982, the second wave of punk in the UK was over, and post-punk bands were taking over the indie music scene.

Spizz changed his band's name every year. Spizz reports that he attempted to be recognised by the Guinness Book of Records as the act to have released records under the most names, but was told that this would be "too specialised."

American stadium rockers R.E.M. (who started their band in the early 1980s) recorded a limited edition version of "Where's Captain Kirk?" in 1992, which they gave to fan club members.

== 1983–2009 ==
After the demise of Spizzenergi 2, Spizz embarked on several solo projects (as SpizzOrwell and performing on The Last Future Show) and played guitar for Heaven 17. In 1985, he toured with backing tapes and female backing singers as Spizz and the Astronauties. After a dance mix of Where's Captain Kirk? in 1987, he had no significant chart success.

The birth of a daughter, Molly Spiers-MacLeod, in 1991, consumed the bulk of his energy as he stayed home to care for her. Spiers-MacLeod also became a musician and has played in various bands including Poussez Posse, the Featherz, I, Doris, and the Untitled Band Project. She also provided vocals for Wild Mutation, a glam-era covers band that Spizz himself fronted.

Aside from this project, Spizz has continued to appear live, owing to the encouragement of Paul Hallam, and releases material through Cherry Red Records. One exception was a release on Hallam's own label 442ok called "We're the England", his third England World Cup song attempt (previously "E for England" in 1998 and "On the Road to Yokohama" in 2002). Other Spizz football-related songs are "The Sun Never Sets on Aston Villa" (which appears on the club's official compact disc), "Three Lions in the Sky" (which was aimed at a television producer) and his own label "company song", "442ok".

In May 2006, a maxi-single of the earliest known recording of "Where's Captain Kirk?" (from Spizz's own archives) was released.

From 2007, the band Spizzenergi performed at mini festivals in Milan, Bologna and Leuven. In May 2009, they supported the New York Dolls at the 100 Club.

== 2012-present ==
In 2012, Spizz and existing member Jeff Walker (drums) were joined by Luca Comencini (guitar), Ben Lawson (bass) and Phil Ross (guitar). Spizzenergi performed numerous shows, including the Joe Strummer/ Strummerville commemorative benefit festival at the 100 Club in London and a Fire Brigades Union benefit show along with Sex Pistols original bassist Glen Matlock and former guitarist of the Clash Mick Jones.

In 2013, Spizzenergi headlined shows in Leeds, London, Glasgow, Livingstone and Bristol, performed two consecutive and very successful shows at Berlin's Cortina Bob and made guest appearances with the Rezillos and Cockney Rejects.

Throughout 2014, the band played the Rebellion Festival in Blackpool, the Undercover Punk Festival in Bisley and other UK cities, and went on a short tour of Germany. They also supported '80s post-punk icon Toyah at a sold-out show at the O2 Academy Islington.

In September 2014, Spizzenergi released a single on 7" blood red vinyl through Plane Groovy Records entitled "City of Eyes", with a live studio version of "Soldier Soldier" on the B-side. The single was a cutting criticism of surveillance society, state intrusion and phone hacking. After playing it on his BBC show, DJ Gary Crowley stated that Spizz's "pen had never been sharper."

"City of Eyes" was accompanied by a highly acclaimed video shot by Brazilian art director Marcio Schenkel.

In 2015, the band released a docu-movie produced by director Phill Calland entitled The Road to Wakefield Pier, inspired by the George Orwell book The Road to Wigan Pier, in which the author documents 1930s poverty in the north of England and argues for socialism. The Road to Wakefield Pier includes live footage and interviews shot in Wakefield when the band played in the town at Warehouse23.

The band also completed a five-city UK tour with Spear of Destiny, a double headline St. Valentine show with Department S, and a repeat appearance at the Undercover Festival.

2015 also saw headline shows in London, Munich and Augsburg, as well as five UK cities with Theatre of Hate, and back-to-back gigs in Edinburgh and Glasgow with The Rezillos.

On 20 September 2016, the band headlined the 100 Club's 40th-anniversary punk festival. 2016 also saw the band perform at the Rebellion and Undercover punk festivals, the London Punk Festival, their own annual summer party at the Dublin Castle, and in a guest appearance at the 2016 Bowie Convention in Derby.

The band planned a 2017 live schedule to promote the release of a new vinyl single called "Here Come the Machines" and a reworking of "Red and Black" from the 1980 debut album.

Long term drummer Jeff Walker was replaced in early 2020 by ex-Department S and The Wigs, drummer Alan Galaxy.

In 2020 a new single, "Christmas in Denmark Street", mixed by Tony Visconti, reached number 7 in the Official Vinyl Singles Chart. This was followed in 2021 by a faithful cover version of David Bowie's "Valentine's Day", again mixed by Visconti, which reached number 3 in the vinyl chart.

== Discography ==
=== Albums ===
- Do a Runner (as Athletico Spizz 80) (18 July 1980: A&M) No. 27 UK Albums Chart
- Spikey Dream Flower (as the Spizzles) (April 1981: A&M)

=== Compilation albums / EPs ===
- Spizz: Spizz History (November 1983: Rough Trade)
- Spizz Oil: The Peel Sessions (February 1987: Strange Fruit)
- Unhinged (March 1994: Damaged Goods)
- Spizz Not Dead Shock: A Decade of Spizz History 1978 – 88 (May 1996: Cherry red)
- Where’s Captain Kirk (May 2002: Cherry red)

=== Singles ===
Band name / Release date	'A' side	'B' side	Label	Notes
Spizzoil: October 1978	"6000 Crazy"	"1989" / "Fibre"	Rough Trade	
Spizzoil: December 1978	"Cold City"	"Red And Black" / "Solarisation" / "Platform 3"	Rough Trade	
Spizzenergi: September 1979	"Soldier, Soldier"	"Virginia Plain"	Rough Trade	
Spizzenergi: December 1979	"Where's Captain Kirk?"	"Amnesia"	Rough Trade	
Athletico Spizz 80: June 1980	"No Room"	"Spock's Missing"	Rough Trade	
Athletico Spizz 80: July 1980	"Hot Deserts"	"Legal Proceedings"	A&M	
Athletico Spizz 80: October 1980	"Central Park"	"Central Park" (Dr. & Nurses dub version)	A&M	
The Spizzles: February 1981	"Risk"	"Melancholy"	A&M	
The Spizzles: April 1981	"Dangers of Living"	"Scared"	A&M	
Spizzenergi 2: February 1982	"Work"	"Megacity III"	Rough Trade	
Spizzenergi 2: June 1982	"Jungle Fever"	"Meaning"	Rough Trade	
Spizz: September 1987	"Where's Captain Kirk?"	"Living Is Better With Freedom"	Hobo Railway	
Spizz Orbit: November 1988	"Love Me Like A Rocket"		Plastic Head	
Spizzenergi: September 2014	"City of Eyes"	"Soldier Soldier" live studio version 2014	Plane Groovy	
Spizzenergi: April 2017	"Here Come The Machines"	"Red and Black" 2017 version	Flickknife Records	
Spizzenergi: Dec 2020	"Christmas in Denmark Street"	"Shallow End"	Holy Dotage Records	
Spizzenergi: Jan 2021	"Valentine's Day"	"Amnesia" recorded live in Düsseldorf in 2017	Holy Dotage Records	

=== John Peel sessions ===
List of all John Peel radio recordings/sessions:

- 1 August 1978 (Spizzoil)
- 12 March 1979 (Spizzenergi)
- 13 November 1979 (Spizzenergi)
- 30 April 1980 (Athletico Spizz 80)

== See also ==
- List of new wave artists
- List of punk bands from the United Kingdom
- List of Peel sessions
- Music of the United Kingdom (1970s)
