= Continued fraction expansion =

For the continued fraction expansion

- of a number, see simple continued fraction,
- of a function, see continued fraction.
