= JC Carroll =

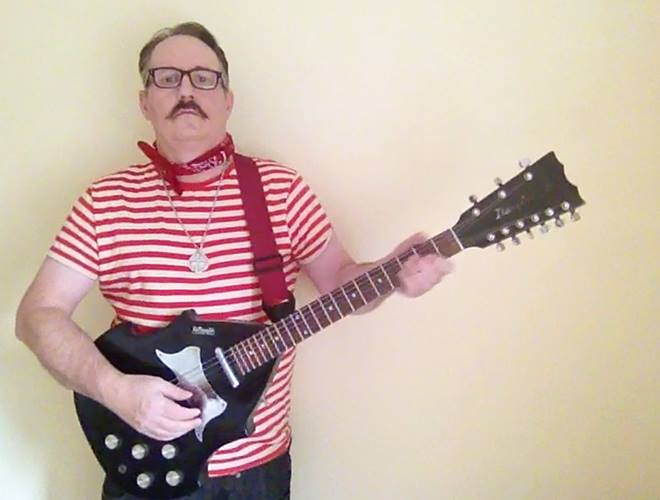
- JC Carroll

Background information
- Born: Jean-Marie Carroll; 9 February 1956 (age 70); Camberley, Surrey
- Genres: Punk rock, reggae, folk
- Years active: 1974–present
- Member of: The Members
- Website: http://www.jccarroll.com/

Jean-Marie "JC" Carroll (born 9 February 1956) is an English composer, songwriter and musician. He has been a members of the new wave-punk group The Members for over 40 years, and is an established film composer.

== Biography ==
JC Carroll was born in Camberley on 9 February 1956 and attended Salesian College in Chertsey, Surrey. After playing in various school bands, Carroll's first taste of serious music was a 1974 chance meeting in the Three Mariners in Bagshot, Surrey, with pub rock pioneer and 1970s icon Graham Parker. They recorded a two-track 1/4-inch tape in Carroll's bedroom later to become known in Parker mythology as "The Akai Tapes". Parker went on to international acclaim, and Carroll settled into life as a bank clerk, living in a bedsit in Kilburn and writing songs on a battered acoustic guitar.

A chance meeting on a train with Nicky Ritz, a graduate of Liverpool University, sometimes insurance salesman, singer, and beat poet with a talent for self-promotion led in 1977 to his being asked to join Ritz's band The Members.

The Members' first single, "Solitary Confinement" (which Carroll co-wrote with Nicky Tesco), was released on Stiff Records. In the spring of 1979, the Members released their UK anthem "The Sound of the Suburbs" (which Carroll also co-wrote). This record went on to sell 250,000 copies in months. The track has been featured on hundreds of punk compilations. The album At the Chelsea Nightclub... gained critical approval and has been listed in Record Collector as one of the top 20 punk albums ever made.

The Members recorded "Offshore Banking Business", a very early example of white reggae (with a political message). The Members then concentrated on the American and overseas market as they chalked up hits in America ("Working Girl") and Australia ("Radio") before becoming dormant in 1983.

Carroll married Sophy Lynn in 1988, and they opened a boutique in Notting Hill Gate in London, named the Dispensary. The Dispensary later grew to four separate shops in Soho (London and Notting Hill Gate. The shop became a gathering place for the early acid house scene. During this period, he became more and more involved in the production and design of tee shirts then tailored clothing. Without any formal training, Carroll made trousers, jackets, overcoats, shirts and leather jackets for the Dispensary. JC and Sophy had two children Grace Ivana and Irma Rose and worked together until 2002 when they separated.

During the 1980s and 1990s, Carroll concentrated on playing the accordion and mandolin and studying various European and ethnic music. During this period, he recorded music with Sex Pistol Glen Matlock and New York Doll Johnny Thunders, playing both mandolin and accordion on Thunders' version of "Que Sera Sera". A chance meeting with film music composer Michael Kamen led to Carroll's being asked to play accordion on Don Juan DeMarco, featuring Marlon Brando and Johnny Depp.

In 2008, Carroll married his partner Sheila and re-established The Members as a live and recording band with original bassist Chris Payne and new drummer Nick Cash (temporarily replaced in 2010 by Rat Scabies of The Damned). In 2009, Carroll recorded The Golborne Variations, with Guy Pratt, Nick Cash, Chester Kamen, Chris Payne and Jennifer Pearl. Long-term collaborator and producer David M. Allen produced this album. In 2011, Carroll shot and edited a movie, with filmmaker Simon Godley, titled The Golborne Variations. This film premiered together with the first public performance of Golborne Variations at the 2011 Portobello Film Festival, where it won a special prize.

In 2011, New Musical Express (NME) listed two of Carroll's songs, 1979's "Offshore Banking" and 2009's "Caveman TV" on a list of forgotten masterpieces.

In 2012, Carroll produced and released two records on his own AngloCentric Label - The Members fourth studio album Ingrrland and a solo album titled 21st Century Blues (Released as Jay Cee Carroll). He also released a single using the stage name jPad titled "Totally Obsessed". He also wrote soundtrack music for Julien Temple's documentary London a Modern Babylon

2013 saw The Members tour Australia and New Zealand, and Carroll continued to produce videos, notably a cover of David Bowie's "Where Are We Now?"

In 2014, The Members toured the U.S. Carroll worked on soundtracks for 6 Bullets to Hell, Hec McAdam, Looking for Johnny.

In 2016, Carroll completed production of The Members fifth studio album titled One Law. The album was released in conjunction with Cadiz Music and Carroll's label Anglocentric. This was the first Members album produced by Carroll. It featured Nigel Bennett on lead guitar, Chris Payne on bass, Nick Cash on drums, Carroll on various instruments and vocals. It also featured guest appearances by original Jam vocalist Steve Brookes and longtime Pink Floyd and David Gilmour bass player Guy Pratt on "Incident at Surbiton".

1n 2020 Carroll published an Autobiography (Still) Annoying the Neighbours with the help of rock journalist Chris Salewicz and graphic artist Malcolm Garrett the book was well received in the press sold well. He also composed music for director Julien Temple's on the Award-winning Shane MacGowan biopic A Crock of Gold

In 2021 Carroll produced the Members 7th Studio Album "Bedsitland" with current members of The Members Nigel Bennett, Chris Payne, and Nick Cash who were joined by guests John Perry (the Only Ones) and Guy Pratt (Pink Floyd) To Combat the Boredom of lockdown he began broadcasting from his studio a series of Live Streams Known as "Solitary confinement in the Suburbs"

2022 Carroll takes part in a Radio Documentary about art in the Suburbs where Ian Hislop describes JC as "the TS Eliot of Punk" in his Radio 4 Programme "in Suburbia"

== Discography ==
JC Carroll discography

- Streets - The Members, Beggars Banquet Records (1977)
- Solitary Confinement - The Members, Stiff Records (1978)
- Sound of the Suburbs - The Members, Virgin Records (1979)
- At the Chelsea Nightclub - The Members, Virgin Records (1979)
- 1980 The Choice Is Yours - The Members, Virgin Records (1980)
- Casual Trousers - Fresh Records (1982)
- Solidarity - The Children of 7 - Stiff Records (1983)
- Uprhythm Downbeat - The Members, Arista Records (1983)
- Radio - The Members, Island Records (1983)
- Going West - The Members, Albion (1983)
- Que Sera Sera Johnny Thunders, Jungle Records (1998)
- The Rock Is in the Laptop - Anglocentric (2006)
- New English Blues Volume 1 - Anglocentric (2007)
- The Golborne Variations - Anglocentric (2008)
- Live in Berlin: The Members - Anglocentric (2012)
- 21st Century Blues - Anglocentric (2012)
- Ingrrland - The Members, Anglocentric (2012)
- One Law - The Members, Anglocentric (2016)
- Country and Electronica- The Space Rangers, Anglocentric (2016)
- Smartphone Junkie - The Members, Anglocentric (2018)
- Greatest Hits: All the Singles - The Members, Anglocentric (2018)
- West Byfleet Selfie - Anglocentric (2019)
- Version - The Members, Cleopatra Records (2019)
- Bedsitland - The Members, Anglocentric Records (2021)

=== Films ===
with scores or contributions by JC Carroll

- Urgh! A Music War (1981)
- Don Juan DeMarco (1994)
- Loch Ness (1996)
- Hannibal Rising (2007)
- Straightheads (2007)
- Joe Strummer: The Future Is Unwritten (2007)
- Stardust (2007)
- Virgin Territory (2008)
- Telstar (2008)
- Oil City Confidential (2009)
- Johnny English Reborn (2011)
- The Golborne Variations (2011)
- London Modern Babylon (2012)
- Looking for Johnny (2014)
- Six Bullets to Hell (2014)
- The Invisible Woman (2013)
- Hector (2015)
- Amar Akbar & Tony (2015)
- The Marriage of Reason and Squalor (2015)
- Let Me Go (2016)
- Sad Vacation (2018)
- Suggs: My Life Story (2018)
- We Are the League (2019)
- Crock of Gold (2020)

== See also ==
- The Members
