= Lifehouse Chronicles =

Box set by Pete Townshend
- Released: 17 February 2000 (UK)
- Recorded: 1970–1999 at various locations in the UK
- Genre: Rock
- Label: Eel Pie

Pete Townshend chronology
A Benefit for Maryville Academy (1999)	Lifehouse Chronicles (2000)	Lifehouse Elements (2000)

Professional ratings
Review scores
Source	Rating
AllMusic	4/5 stars

Lifehouse Chronicles is a box set released in 2000 by the English musician Pete Townshend with the focus of the box being the formerly "abandoned" Lifehouse rock opera. The set contains song demos by Pete Townshend; including solo versions of "Baba O'Riley", "Won't Get Fooled Again", and "Who Are You", and the Lifehouse Radio Program. The box set release was followed by two Sadler's Wells Lifehouse concerts and the release of a live CD and video/DVD titled, respectively, Pete Townshend Live: Sadler's Wells 2000 and Pete Townshend – Music from Lifehouse.

== Concept ==
The set collects songs and other compositions relating to Lifehouse, a musical concept developed by Townshend in 1970 as a follow-up to The Who's highly successful rock opera, Tommy. Rooted heavily in the teachings of Townshend's spiritual mentor Meher Baba as well as in science fiction literature, Lifehouse was meant to explore the idea that music is the fundamental basis of all life – that every human being on Earth has a unique musical melody that "describes" them, and only them, perfectly. When the unique songs of enough people are played in unison, the result would be a single harmonic note – the One Note – akin to the quintessence sought by ancient alchemists. Lifehouse was to be a true multimedia project: a double LP rock opera, a motion picture, and an interactive concert experience.

The story was to take place in 21st century Britain, in an age where pollution has become such a drastic problem that most people never set foot outdoors in their life. This populace spends most of their time in "experience suits". These suits provide the people with artificial lives superior to any they could eke out in the real world, yet devoid somehow of spiritual fulfilment. One discontented soul, known only as "The Hacker", rediscovers 20th century rock and roll music, and breaks into the computer network controlling the suits to invite people to leave their suits and come together for a concert. Despite the best efforts of the fascist government, thousands of people gather at the Hacker's concert, with millions more watching through their suits, as the musicians and audience perform experimental songs like those described above. Just as the police storm in and shoot the Hacker, the audience and band manage simultaneously to produce the perfect universal tone, The One Note, and everyone participating in and watching the concert simply vanishes, presumably having departed for a higher plane of existence. The story is seen through the eyes of a middle-aged farmer named Ray, a farmer from a remote unpolluted corner of Scotland, who travels south looking for his daughter who has run away to the concert.

== History ==
=== 1970–1971 ===
In September 1970, Townshend penned a song called "Pure and Easy", about the One Note, the first song written specifically for Lifehouse. In the following two months he wrote approximately 20 additional songs, recording intricate home demos of each. Rather than attempting to tell the story through the lyrics, as he had done with Tommy, the songs were stand-alone pieces, meant to be elucidated by the movie and detailed sleeve notes to be included with the album. Most of those songs were recorded by the Who in two sessions in the winter of 1970/1971, as well as several "rehearsals" accompanied by guitarist Leslie West of the band Mountain and an impromptu live concert at the Young Vic Theatre in London in April 1971.

While Townshend had high hopes for the project, others were skeptical. Universal Studios, which had recently inked a two-film deal with the Who for the rights to a film version of Tommy, was not impressed by the screenplay Townshend offered them. A series of spontaneous concerts the Who had held in London failed to produce usable material, and it soon became apparent that the project was doomed to failure. Though many of the songs written for Lifehouse came to be released on the Who album Who's Next, Lifehouse was to remain unfinished for nearly thirty years.

=== 1971–1998 ===
Townshend never abandoned hope that Lifehouse might someday become a reality. He continued to write songs for the project throughout the '70s, and in 1980 worked together with bandmate John Entwistle to produce a new screenplay with a new story. Negotiations to produce this film, however, fell apart when Townshend found himself infatuated with the wife of the film's director (a story recounted in the song "Athena", to be found on the Who album It's Hard).

It was not until 1992 that Townshend again began work on the project. In that year, Townshend recorded the solo album Psychoderelict, a semi-biographical story told in the style of a radio play. The hero of this piece, like Townshend, is an aging rock star labouring tirelessly on a 20-year-old rock opera, called "Gridlife Chronicles" in the story, who finds himself embroiled in a sex scandal that jeopardises the future of the project. Several of the synthesizer pieces Townshend recorded in 1970 make their first official appearance on this album.

In 1998, Townshend's dream of bringing Lifehouse to a wide audience finally came true, when BBC Radio approached him with the idea of developing a radio play based on Lifehouse and incorporating the original music written for the project. The play, just under two hours in length, was transmitted on BBC Radio 3 on 5 December 1999.

== The box set ==
Following the broadcast of the play, Townshend assembled and released the Lifehouse Chronicles box set in 2000 as a formal culmination of his work on the project. The set, made available exclusively through his website and at concerts, consists of six CDs. The first two CDs collect the original demos he recorded of the Lifehouse songs, several of which were never recorded by The Who. The third disc consists of several of Townshend's experimental synthesizer pieces, live recordings of Lifehouse songs, and new studio recordings of those songs produced especially for the set. The fourth disc features classical music by the London Chamber Orchestra which was used in the radio play, featuring compositions by Townshend as well as selections by Baroque composers Henry Purcell, Domenico Scarlatti and Michel Corrette. The fifth and sixth discs contain the radio play itself. Included with the set is a booklet featuring an introduction by Townshend, a history of the project written by Townshend webmaster/publicist Matt Kent , lyrics for most of the Lifehouse songs, and a script of the play. Townshend stated in his introduction that he eventually hoped to release an expanded version of the set, to be titled "The Lifehouse Method", which would include software for producing a synthesizer track based on the user's vital statistics. Instead, The Lifehouse Method debuted in early 2007 as a website. After generating some 10,000 new pieces of music for users, the project closed. The artwork and design of the box set was created by designer Laurence Sutherland.

=== Track listing ===
All songs written and composed by Pete Townshend, except where noted

Disc one: Lifehouse Demos
No.	Title	Length
1.	"Teenage Wasteland"	6:47
2.	"Going Mobile"	4:13
3.	"Baba O'Riley"	7:38
4.	"Time Is Passing"	3:26
5.	"Love Ain't for Keeping"	1:31
6.	"Bargain"	4:30
7.	"Too Much of Anything"	5:35
8.	"Music Must Change"	4:41
9.	"Greyhound Girl"	3:05
10.	"Mary"	4:17
11.	"Behind Blue Eyes"	3:26
12.	"Baba O'Riley" (Instrumental)	9:50
13.	"Sister Disco"	6:50

Disc two: Lifehouse Demos
No.	Title	Length
1.	"I Don't Even Know Myself"	5:27
2.	"Put the Money Down"	5:50
3.	"Pure and Easy"	8:35
4.	"Getting in Tune"	4:04
5.	"Let's See Action"	6:20
6.	"Slip Kid"	3:57
7.	"Relay"	4:15
8.	"Who Are You"	7:37
9.	"Join Together"	6:23
10.	"Won't Get Fooled Again"	8:30
11.	"The Song Is Over"	5:41

Disc three: Themes and Experiments
No.	Title	Length
1.	"Baba M1" (O'Riley 2nd Movement 1971)	3:05
2.	"Who Are You" (Gateway Remix – From Shepherd's Bush Empire 1998)	9:04
3.	"Behind Blue Eyes" (New version 1999)	3:57
4.	"Baba M2" (2nd Movement Part 1 1971)	3:18
5.	"Pure and Easy" (Original Demo Reworked 1999)	9:16
6.	"Vivaldi" (Baba M5 on Psychoderelict) with Hame 1999)	2:42
7.	"Who Are You" (Live and Uncut at the Shepherd's Bush Empire 1998)	12:47
8.	"Hinterland Rag" (Piano Rag for Three Hands – Yamaha Disklavier 1999)	2:49
9.	"Pure and Easy" (New Version 1999)	4:47
10.	"Can You Help the One You Really Love?" (Demo 1999)	5:05
11.	"Won't Get Fooled Again" (Live and Uncut at the Shepherd's Bush Empire 1998)	11:30

Disc four: Arrangements and Orchestrations
No.	Title	Writer(s)	Length
1.	"One Note– Prologue"		1:26
2.	"Fantasia Upon One Note" (Quick Movement)	Henry Purcell	1:01
3.	"Baba O'Riley" (Orchestral version)		9:36
4.	"Sonata K:212"	Domenico Scarlatti	4:18
5.	"Tragedy"		4:23
6.	"No. 4 Aria"	Michel Corrette	2:41
7.	"No. 2 Giga"	Michel Corrette	2:24
8.	"No. 6 in D Minor"	Michel Corrette	2:37
9.	"No. 3 Adagio and Allegro"	Michel Corrette	4:31
10.	"Hinterland Rag"		3:33
11.	"Sonata K:213"	Domenico Scarlatti	4:25
12.	"The Gordian Knot Untied: Overture"	Henry Purcell	3:21
13.	"The Gordian Knot Untied: Allegro"	Henry Purcell	1:59
14.	"The Gordian Knot Untied: Air"		0:58
15.	"The Gordian Knot Untied: Rondean Minuet"		1:49
16.	"The Gordian Knot Untied: Air"		1:14
17.	"The Gordian Knot Untied: Jig"		1:23
18.	"The Gordian Knot Untied: Chaconne"		2:31
19.	"The Gordian Knot Untied: Air"		0:48
20.	"The Gordian Knot Untied: Minuet"		1:19
21.	"The Gordian Knot Untied: Overture (Reprise)"		3:27
22.	"Tragedy Explained"		6:26
23.	"One Note – Epilogue"		1:20
24.	"Fantasia Upon One Note"	Henry Purcell	2:48

Disc five: Radio Play
No.	Title	Length
1.	"Lifehouse Radio Play No. 1"	3:28
2.	"Lifehouse Radio Play No. 2"	4:45
3.	"Lifehouse Radio Play No. 3"	7:00
4.	"Lifehouse Radio Play No. 4"	7:56
5.	"Lifehouse Radio Play No. 5"	5:30
6.	"Lifehouse Radio Play No. 6"	6:35
7.	"Lifehouse Radio Play No. 7"	4:10
8.	"Lifehouse Radio Play No. 8"	5:02
9.	"Lifehouse Radio Play No. 9"	7:20
10.	"Lifehouse Radio Play No. 10"	5:27

Disc six: Radio play
No.	Title	Length
1.	"Lifehouse Radio Play No. 1"	4:27
2.	"Lifehouse Radio Play No. 2"	5:40
3.	"Lifehouse Radio Play No. 3"	6:06
4.	"Lifehouse Radio Play No. 4"	6:04
5.	"Lifehouse Radio Play No. 5"	5:07
6.	"Lifehouse Radio Play No. 6"	4:39
7.	"Lifehouse Radio Play No. 7"	4:59
8.	"Lifehouse Radio Play No. 8"	4:32
9.	"Lifehouse Radio Play No. 9"	8:20

== Related recordings ==
=== By The Who ===
The Who's versions of most of the above-listed songs can be found on the following albums:

- 1971: Who's Next
- 1974: Odds & Sods
- 1975: The Who By Numbers
- 1978: Who Are You
- 1981: Hooligans

=== By Pete Townshend ===
- 1972: Who Came First (the album contains Pete Townshend's Lifehouse demos of "Pure and Easy", "Let's See Action", and "Time Is Passing". "Pure And Easy" was shortened by three minutes and received additional overdubs.)
- 2000: Lifehouse Chronicles
- 2000: Lifehouse Elements
- 2002: Music from Lifehouse DVD (the 100-minute video was directed by Hugo Currie and Toby Leslie, and was issued in color as a Region 1 NTSC DVD, ASIN: B00005UQ86. The performances included are: "Fantasia Upon One Note", *"Teenage Wasteland", "Time Is Passing", "Love Ain't For Keeping", "Greyhound Girl", "Mary", "I Don't Know Myself", "Bargain", "Pure and Easy", "Baba O'Riley", "Behind Blue Eyes", "Let's See Action", "Getting in Tune", "Relay", "Join Together", "Won't Get Fooled Again", "Song Is Over", "Can You Help the One You Really Love?".)

=== By Lawrence Ball ===
- 2012: Method Music

== Notes ==
- The single-disc sampler of the box set, entitled Lifehouse Elements, is available through most record stores.
- The album Pete Townshend Live: Sadler's Wells 2000 features much of the Lifehouse material performed live in concert, and like the box set is exclusively available from Townshend's Eelpie.com website.
