= Live at the Oval 1971 =

Live album by the Who
- Released: 22 August 2025
- Recorded: 18 September 1971
- Venue: The Oval, south London
- Genre: Rock
- Length: 76:34
- Label: UMe
- Producer: Pete Townshend

The Who chronology
Live in Philadelphia 4.12.1973 (2025)	Live at the Oval 1971 (2025)	Who Are You (deluxe edition) (2025)

Live at the Oval 1971 is a live album by the English rock band the Who, released on 22 August 2025, by Universal Music Enterprises.

== Background ==
On 18 September 1971, the Who performed a famine relief benefit concert at the Oval Cricket Ground in the Kensington district in South London for 75 minutes to a reportedly enthusiastic crowd.

== Release and reception ==
Live at the Oval 1971 was released on 22 August 2025 to positive reviews from critics.

=== Critical reception ===
Professional ratings
Review scores
Source	Rating
AllMusic	3.5/5 stars
All About Jazz	4/5 stars
Mojo	5/5 stars
Record Collector	4/5 stars
Spectrum Culture	4/5 stars
XS Noise	4.5/5 stars

Writing for AllMusic, Mark Deming wrote that it "is a raw, invigorating document of the Who casually sharing their combustible brilliance, with Pete Townshend's razor-sharp guitar, John Entwistle's thunderous but melodic bass, Keith Moon's frantic drumming, and Roger Daltrey's strutting vocals coalescing into a wondrous rock & roll assault. Nearly every live album from this era demonstrates the violently artful power of the Who on-stage; Live at the Oval 1971 stands in that fine tradition, and serious fans will certainly want this in their collections."

All About Jazz critic Doug Collette calls it a "fifteen-song concert from the volatile group's headlining appearance on the bill of 'Goodbye Summer: A Rock Concert in aid of Famine Relief for the People of Bangla Desh.' During the course of the seventy-plus minute set at The Oval cricket ground in South London on September 18, 1971, the program runs the gamut of the Who's history."

Spectrum Culture writes that it is a "particularly exciting release", noting that "The Who might not be quite at their best on this one, but their comfort and newfound drive allow them to take some chances", concluding by writing that "If the band sound a little rough at times, that’s part of the fun, and this album captures them at a pivotal moment in their career, still tearing up the early music while simultaneously embracing a big, forward-thinking sound. Few bands could do that as well, and none have done it as exhilaratingly as the Who."

== Track listing ==
All tracks are written by Pete Townshend, except where noted.

No.	Title	Writer(s)	Length
1.	"So Glad to See Ya"	Roger Daltrey	1:05
2.	"Summertime Blues"	Jerry Capehart; Eddie Cochran	3:41
3.	"My Wife"	John Entwistle	6:47
4.	"Love Ain't for Keeping"		2:24
5.	"I Can't Explain"		2:23
6.	"Substitute"		2:25
7.	"Bargain"		7:03
8.	"Behind Blue Eyes"		4:46
9.	"Won't Get Fooled Again"		8:56
10.	"Baby Don't You Do It"	Holland–Dozier–Holland	8:48
11.	"Pinball Wizard"		2:57
12.	"See Me, Feel Me/Listening to You"		5:10
13.	"My Generation"		3:27
14.	"Naked Eye"		7:21
15.	"Magic Bus"		9:21
Total length:			76:34

== Charts ==
Weekly chart performance for Live at the Oval 1971
Chart (2025)	Peak position
Austrian Albums (Ö3 Austria)	16
Belgian Albums (Ultratop Flanders)	150
Belgian Albums (Ultratop Wallonia)	65
German Albums (Offizielle Top 100)	16
Scottish Albums (OCC)	8
Swiss Albums (Schweizer Hitparade)	35
UK Albums (OCC)	40
US Billboard 200	147
US Top Hard Rock Albums (Billboard)	10
US Indie Store Album Sales (Billboard)	14
US Vinyl Albums (Billboard)	19
