= Lifehouse Elements =

Compilation album sampler by Pete Townshend
- Released: 2000 (US)
- Genre: Rock; hard rock
- Label: Redline Entertainment

Pete Townshend chronology
Lifehouse Chronicles (2000)	Lifehouse Elements (2000)	Live: The Empire (2000)

Professional ratings
Review scores
Source	Rating
Allmusic	3/5 stars

Lifehouse Elements is a single CD sampler of the 6-CD Box Set The Lifehouse Chronicles released by Pete Townshend in 2000. The song "New Song" is not found in the box set. The CD was released 23 May 2000 in the US by Redline Entertainment.

== Track listing ==
No.	Title	Length
1.	"One Note (Prologue)"	1:26
2.	"Baba O'Riley" (Orchestral version performed by The London Chamber Orchestra)	9:36
3.	"Pure and Easy"	8:35
4.	"New Song"	5:02
5.	"Gettin' in Tune"	4:04
6.	"Behind Blue Eyes" (New version)	3:59
7.	"Let's See Action"	6:16
8.	"Who Are You" (Gateway remix)	9:05
9.	"Won't Get Fooled Again"	8:27
10.	"Baba M1"	3:05
11.	"The Song Is Over"	5:43
