= The Ultimate Collection (The Who album) =

- British edition cover

Greatest hits album by the Who
- Released: 11 June 2002
- Genre: Rock
- Length: 155:14
- Label: Polydor; MCA; Geffen
- Producer: Bill Levenson; Andy McKaie

The Who chronology
Blues to the Bush (2000)	The Ultimate Collection (2002)	Live at the Royal Albert Hall (2003)

American edition cover

The Ultimate Collection is a 2002 two-disc greatest hits set by the English rock band the Who with both singles and top hits from albums, all of which have been remastered. The compilation was released by Polydor Records internationally and on MCA Records in the US. The first 150,000 copies added a third disk with rare tracks and music videos. The album debuted on the Billboard 200 album chart on 29 June 2002, at No. 31 and hit No. 17 on the British charts. It was certified gold by the RIAA on 15 July 2002 and platinum on 13 March 2008.

Professional ratings
Review scores
Source	Rating
AllMusic	5/5 stars
BBC	Positive
The Encyclopedia of Popular Music	5/5 stars
PopMatters	Mixed

== Track listing ==
All songs written by Pete Townshend except where noted.

=== British edition ===
==== Disc one ====
No.	Title	Place of Origin	Length
1.	"I Can't Explain"	Non-album single, 1964	2:04
2.	"Anyway, Anyhow, Anywhere" (Townshend, Roger Daltrey)	Non-album single, 1965	2:40
3.	"My Generation"	My Generation, 1965	3:17
4.	"The Kids Are Alright" (Single version)	My Generation	2:45
5.	"A Legal Matter"	My Generation	2:47
6.	"Substitute"	Non-album single, 1966	3:47
7.	"I'm a Boy"	Non-album single	2:36
8.	"Boris the Spider" (John Entwistle)	A Quick One, 1966	2:27
9.	"Happy Jack"	Non-album single (UK); Happy Jack (U.S.), 1966	2:10
10.	"Pictures of Lily"	Non-album single, 1967	2:44
11.	"I Can See for Miles" (Single version)	The Who Sell Out, 1967	4:06
12.	"Call Me Lightning"	Non-album single (U.S.); Non-album B-side to "Dogs" (UK), 1968	2:19
13.	"Magic Bus"	Non-album single (UK); Magic Bus: The Who on Tour (U.S.), 1968	3:20
14.	"Pinball Wizard"	Tommy, 1969	3:01
15.	"I'm Free"	Tommy	2:39
16.	"See Me, Feel Me"	Tommy (taken from "We're Not Gonna Take It!")	3:23
17.	"The Seeker"	Non-album single, 1970	3:11
18.	"Summertime Blues" (Live; Eddie Cochran, Jerry Capehart)	Live at Leeds, 1970	3:22
19.	"My Wife" (Entwistle)	Who's Next, 1971	3:34
20.	"Baba O'Riley"	Who's Next	4.59
21.	"Bargain"	Who's Next	5:33
22.	"Behind Blue Eyes"	Who's Next	3:41
23.	"Won't Get Fooled Again"	Who's Next	8:31

==== Disc two ====
No.	Title	Place of Origin	Length
1.	"Let's See Action (Nothing Is Everything)"	Non-album single, 1971	3:57
2.	"Pure And Easy"	Odds & Sods, 1974; recorded in 1971 for Lifehouse/Who's Next	5:21
3.	"Join Together"	Non-album single, 1972	4:21
4.	"Long Live Rock"	Odds & Sods, 1974; recorded in 1972 for Rock Is Dead—Long Live Rock!, the precursor to Quadrophenia, 1973	3:54
5.	"The Real Me"	Quadrophenia	3:30
6.	"5:15" (Single version)	Quadrophenia	4:53
7.	"Love, Reign o'er Me"	Quadrophenia	5:50
8.	"Squeeze Box"	The Who by Numbers, 1975	2:40
9.	"Who Are You"	Who Are You, 1978	6:21
10.	"Had Enough" (Entwistle)	Who Are You	4:28
11.	"Sister Disco"	Who Are You	4:20
12.	"You Better You Bet"	Face Dances, 1981	5:36
13.	"Don't Let Go the Coat"	Face Dances	3:42
14.	"The Quiet One" (Entwistle)	Face Dances	3:07
15.	"Another Tricky Day"	Face Dances	4:53
16.	"Athena"	It's Hard, 1982	3:46
17.	"Eminence Front"	It's Hard	5:39

=== American edition ===
==== Disc one ====
No.	Title	Place of Origin	Length
1.	"I Can't Explain"	Non-album single
2.	"Anyway, Anyhow, Anywhere" (Townshend, Daltrey)	Non-album single
3.	"My Generation"	My Generation
4.	"The Kids Are Alright" (Single version)	My Generation
5.	"A Legal Matter"	My Generation
6.	"Substitute"	Non-album single
7.	"I'm a Boy"	Non-album single
8.	"Boris the Spider" (Entwistle)	A Quick One
9.	"Happy Jack"	Non-album single (UK); Happy Jack (U.S.)
10.	"Pictures of Lily"	Non-album single
11.	"I Can See for Miles" (Single version)	The Who Sell Out
12.	"Call Me Lightning"	Non-album single (U.S.); Non-album B-side to "Dogs" (UK)
13.	"Magic Bus"	Non-album single (UK); Magic Bus: The Who on Tour (U.S.)
14.	"Pinball Wizard"	Tommy
15.	"I'm Free"	Tommy
16.	"See Me, Feel Me"	Tommy
17.	"The Seeker"	Non-album single
18.	"Summertime Blues (Live)" (Cochran, Capehart)	Live at Leeds
19.	"My Wife" (Entwistle)	Who's Next
20.	"Baba O'Riley"	Who's Next
21.	"Bargain"	Who's Next

==== Disc two ====
No.	Title	Place of Origin	Length
1.	"Behind Blue Eyes"	Who's Next
2.	"Won't Get Fooled Again"	Who's Next
3.	"Let's See Action (Nothing Is Everything)"	Non-album single
4.	"Pure and Easy"	Odds and Sods
5.	"Join Together"	Non-album single
6.	"Long Live Rock"	Odds and Sods
7.	"The Real Me"	Quadrophenia
8.	"5:15" (Single version)	Quadrophenia
9.	"Love, Reign o'er Me"	Quadrophenia
10.	"Squeeze Box"	The Who by Numbers
11.	"Who Are You"	Who Are You
12.	"Sister Disco"	Who Are You
13.	"You Better You Bet"	Face Dances
14.	"Eminence Front"	It's Hard

==== Disc three (Limited edition only) ====
No.	Title	Place of Origin	Length
1.	"Substitute" (U.S. single version)	Non-album single (U.S.), 1966	2:58
2.	"I'm a Boy" (Early version)	Previously unissued, 2002	3:17
3.	"Happy Jack" (Acoustic version)	Previously unissued	2:50
4.	"Magic Bus" (UK single version)	Non-album single, 1968	3:15

== Personnel ==
The Who

- Roger Daltrey – lead vocals
- John Entwistle – bass guitar, horn, lead vocals on "Boris the Spider", "My Wife" and "The Quiet One", backing vocals
- Pete Townshend – guitar, vocals, synthesizer, keyboards
- Keith Moon – drums, percussion (UK: disc 1 & disc 2 tracks 1–11/US: disc 1 & disc 2 tracks 1–12), backing vocals on "Pictures of Lily"
- Kenney Jones – drums (UK: disc 2 tracks 12–17/US: disc 2 tracks 13 & 14)

Additional musicians

- The Ivy League – backing vocals on "I Can't Explain"
- Jimmy Page – rhythm guitar on "I Can't Explain"
- Nicky Hopkins – piano on "Let's See Action" and "Long Live Rock"
- Dave Arbus – violin on "Baba O'Riley"
- Rod Argent – piano on "Who Are You"
- Andy Fairweather Low – backing vocals on "Who Are You"
- Chris Stainton – piano on "5:15"

Production

- Jon Astley – mastering
- Glyn Johns – associate production on "Behind Blue Eyes", "Won't Get Fooled Again" and "Baba O'Riley", production on "Squeeze Box", "Who Are You", "Athena" and "Eminence Front"
- Matt Kent – liner notes
- Kit Lambert – production on "I'm a Boy", "Happy Jack", "I Can See for Miles", "Magic Bus", and "See Me Feel Me"
- Shel Talmy – production on "I Can't Explain", "My Generation", and "The Kids Are Alright"
- Bill Szymczyk – production on "You Better You Bet", "Don't Let Go The Coat", "The Quiet One" and "Another Tricky Day"
- The Who – production on "Summertime Blues", "Behind Blue Eyes", "Won't Get Fooled Again", "5:15", and "Love Reign o'er Me"
- Design & Art Direction by Richard Evans

== Chart performance ==
Chart (2002)	Peak position
UK Albums Chart	17
US Billboard 200	31

== Certifications ==
Region	Certification	Certified units/sales
United Kingdom (BPI)	Platinum	300,000^{*}
United States (RIAA)	Platinum	1,000,000^{^}
^{*} Sales figures based on certification alone.^{^} Shipments figures based on certification alone.
