= Blues to the Bush =

2000 album

Live album by the Who
- Released: April 2000
- Recorded: 12–13 November 1999, House of Blues, Chicago, Illinois, USA, and 22–23 December 1999, Empire Theatre, Shepherd's Bush, London, England, UK
- Genre: Rock
- Length: 106:15
- Label: Musicmaker.com

The Who chronology
BBC Sessions (2000)	Blues to the Bush (2000)	The Ultimate Collection (2002)

Blues to the Bush is a live album by the English rock band the Who recorded at the House of Blues in Chicago on 12 and 13 November 1999, and at the Empire Theatre, Shepherd's Bush on 22 and 23 December 1999. It was sold exclusively from the now defunct MusicMaker.com, though it can still be found on torrent sites and second hand markets such as eBay.

== Track listing ==
=== Disc one ===
1. "I Can't Explain" – 2:37
2. "Substitute" – 3:16
3. "Anyway, Anyhow, Anywhere" (Pete Townshend, Roger Daltrey) – 4:08
4. "Pinball Wizard" – 2:56
5. "My Wife" (John Entwistle) – 7:54
6. "Baba O'Riley" – 5:27
7. "Pure and Easy" – 6:06
8. "You Better You Bet" – 5:39
9. "I'm a Boy" – 2:55
10. "Getting in Tune" – 5:09
11. "The Real Me" – 4:03

=== Disc two ===
1. "Behind Blue Eyes" – 3:46
2. "Magic Bus" – 9:19
3. "Boris the Spider" (John Entwistle) – 2:35
4. "After the Fire" – 4:49
5. "Who Are You" – 6:32
6. "5:15" – 8:35
7. "Won't Get Fooled Again" – 8:53
8. "The Kids Are Alright" – 2:16
9. "My Generation" – 9:20

All song written by Pete Townshend except as noted.

== Personnel ==
The Who

- Roger Daltrey – lead vocals, harmonica, acoustic guitar
- John Entwistle – bass guitar, vocals
- Pete Townshend – lead guitar, acoustic guitar, vocals

Additional musicians

- John "Rabbit" Bundrick – piano, keyboards, backing vocals
- Zak Starkey – drums

Design

- Cover design by Richard Evans
- Photography by Graham Hughes
