= View from a Backstage Pass =

2007 live compilation album by The Who

Live album by the Who
- Released: 5 November 2007
- Recorded: 1969–1976
- Genre: Hard rock
- Length: 131:20
- Label: Self-released
- Producer: Bob Pridden
- Compiler: Jon Astley

The Who chronology
Live from Toronto (2006)	View from a Backstage Pass (2007)	Amazing Journey: The Story of The Who (2008)

View from a Backstage Pass is a live double compilation album by the English rock band the Who, self-released on 5 November 2007.

== Track listing ==
All songs written by Pete Townshend except where noted.

=== Disc one ===
1. "Fortune Teller" (Allen Toussaint) – Recorded at the Grande Ballroom, Detroit, Michigan, 12 October 1969
2. "Happy Jack" – Recorded at City Hall, Hull, 15 February 1970 – 2:12
3. "I'm a Boy" – Recorded at City Hall, Hull, 15 February 1970 – 2:46
4. "A Quick One, While He's Away" – Recorded at City Hall, Hull, 15 February 1970 – 8:53
5. "Magic Bus" – Recorded at an unknown venue in 1971 (mislabelled as occurring at Mammoth Gardens, Denver, Colorado, 9 June 1970) – 13:50
6. "I Can't Explain" – Recorded at Civic Auditorium, San Francisco, California, 13 December 1971 – 2:38
7. "Substitute" – Recorded at Civic Auditorium, San Francisco, California, 13 December 1971 – 2:18
8. "My Wife" (John Entwistle) – Recorded at Civic Auditorium, San Francisco, California, 13 December 1971 – 7:06
9. "Behind Blue Eyes" – Recorded at Civic Auditorium, San Francisco, California, 13 December 1971 – 4:36
10. "Bargain" – Recorded at Civic Auditorium, San Francisco, California, 13 December 1971 – 6:41
11. "Baby Don't You Do It" (Holland-Dozier-Holland) – Recorded at Civic Auditorium, San Francisco, California, 13 December 1971 – 6:17

=== Disc two ===
1. "The Punk and the Godfather" – Recorded at The Spectrum, Philadelphia, Pennsylvania 4 December 1973 – 4:52 (mislabelled as occurring at The Capital Centre, Largo, MD)
2. "5:15" – Recorded at The Spectrum, Philadelphia, Pennsylvania 4 December 1973 – 6:02 (mislabelled as occurring at The Capital Centre, Largo, MD)
3. "Won't Get Fooled Again" – Recorded at The Spectrum, Philadelphia, Pennsylvania 4 December 1973 – 8:53 (mislabelled as occurring at The Capital Centre, Largo, MD)
4. "Young Man Blues" (Mose Allison) – Recorded at Charlton Athletic Football Club, South London,18 May 1974 – 5:57
5. "Tattoo" – Recorded at Charlton Athletic Football Club, South London,18 May 1974 – 3:21
6. "Boris the Spider" (John Entwistle) – Recorded at Charlton Athletic Football Club, South London,18 May 1974 – 3:14
7. "Naked Eye/"Let's See Action"/"My Generation Blues" – Recorded at Charlton Athletic Football Club, South London,18 May 1974 – 14:40
8. "Squeeze Box" – Recorded at Vetch Field, Swansea, Wales, 12 June 1976 – 3:17
9. "Dreaming from the Waist" – Recorded at Vetch Field, Swansea, Wales, 12 June 1976 – 4:54
10. "Fiddle About" (John Entwistle) – Recorded at Vetch Field, Swansea, Wales, 12 June 1976 – 1:45
11. "Pinball Wizard" – Recorded at Vetch Field, Swansea, Wales, 12 June 1976 – 2:48
12. "I'm Free" – Recorded at Vetch Field, Swansea, Wales, 12 June 1976 – 2:17
13. "Tommy's Holiday Camp" (Keith Moon) – Recorded at Vetch Field, Swansea, Wales, 12 June 1976 – 0:51
14. "We're Not Gonna Take It" – Recorded at Vetch Field, Swansea, Wales, 12 June 1976 – 3:32
15. "See Me, Feel Me/Listening To You" – Recorded at Vetch Field, Swansea, Wales, 12 June 1976 – 4:59

== Personnel ==
The Who

- Pete Townshend – lead guitar, vocals
- Roger Daltrey – lead vocals, harmonica
- John Entwistle – bass guitars, vocals
- Keith Moon – drums, percussion, vocals

Production

- Produced by Bob Pridden
- Compiled and mastered by Jon Astley
- Mixed by Bob Pridden and Sean Witt

Design

- Cover design by Richard Evans
