= Live at the Royal Albert Hall (The Who album) =

The Who Live at the Royal Albert Hall

Live album by the Who
- Released: June 2003
- Recorded: 27 November 2000 and 8 February 2002
- Venues: Royal Albert Hall (South Kensington, London, England)
- Genre: Rock
- Length: 161:57
- Label: Steamhammer
- Director: Dick Carruthers
- Producer: Bob Pridden

The Who chronology
The Ultimate Collection (2002)	The Who Live at the Royal Albert Hall (2003)	Then and Now (2004)

Professional ratings
Review scores
Source	Rating
The Encyclopedia of Popular Music	3/5 stars

Live at the Royal Albert Hall is a three-CD live album set by the English rock band the Who, released in June 2003.

Discs one and two were recorded on 27 November 2000 and consist of John Entwistle, Roger Daltrey, Pete Townshend, Zak Starkey, and John "Rabbit" Bundrick performing a concert at the Royal Albert Hall for the Teenage Cancer Trust along with several guests. Disc three features four songs from the Who's last concert with John Entwistle, from 8 February 2002. Townshend dedicated "Heart to Hang Onto" to the late Ronnie Lane. The concert was also released on DVD as The Who & Special Guests: Live at the Royal Albert Hall.

== Track listing ==
All songs are composed by Pete Townshend except where noted.

=== Disc one ===
1. "I Can't Explain" – 2:51
2. "Anyway, Anyhow, Anywhere" (Townshend, Roger Daltrey) – 4:33
3. "Pinball Wizard" – 3:44
4. "Relay" – 8:14
5. "My Wife" (John Entwistle) – 6:38
6. "The Kids Are Alright" – 6:12
7. "Mary Anne with the Shaky Hand" – 4:12
8. "Bargain" – 6:52
9. "Magic Bus" (incl. "Country Line Special" by Cyril Davies) – 10:05
10. "Who Are You" – 7:05
11. "Baba O'Riley" – 5:48

=== Disc two ===
1. "Drowned" – 6:38
2. "Heart to Hang Onto" – 4:41
3. "So Sad About Us" – 3:19
4. "I'm One" (Featuring Eddie Vedder) – 2:51
5. "Getting In Tune" (Featuring Eddie Vedder) – 6:21
6. "Behind Blue Eyes" (Featuring Bryan Adams) – 3:48
7. "You Better You Bet" – 5:46
8. "The Real Me" – 5:27
9. "5:15" – 11:40
10. "Won't Get Fooled Again" – 9:12
11. "Substitute" – 3:20
12. "Let's See Action" – 5:15
13. "My Generation" – 5:30
14. "See Me, Feel Me/Listening to You" – 5:04

=== Disc three ===
1. "I'm Free" – 2:49
2. "I Don't Even Know Myself" – 4:43
3. "Summertime Blues" (Jerry Capehart, Eddie Cochran) – 3:20
4. "Young Man Blues" (Mose Allison) – 5:54

== Personnel ==
The Who

- Roger Daltrey – lead vocals, acoustic guitar
- John Entwistle – bass guitar, vocals
- Pete Townshend – lead guitar, acoustic guitar, vocals

Additional musicians

- John "Rabbit" Bundrick – piano, keyboards, backing vocals
- Zak Starkey – drums

Special Guests

- Bryan Adams – vocals on "Behind Blue Eyes", "See Me, Feel Me/Listening to You"
- Noel Gallagher – guitar and backing vocals on "Won't Get Fooled Again"
- Kelly Jones – vocals and rhythm guitar on "Substitute"
- Nigel Kennedy – violin on "Baba O'Riley"
- Eddie Vedder – vocals on "I'm One", "Getting in Tune", "Let's See Action", and "See Me, Feel Me/Listening to You"
- Paul Weller – vocals and acoustic guitar on "So Sad About Us"

Design

- Cover design by Richard Evans
- Photography by Ross Halfin
