= Hooligans (album) =

1981 compilation album by the Who

Compilation album by The Who
- Released: September 1981
- Recorded: 1964–1978
- Genre: Rock
- Length: 80:17
- Label: MCA

The Who chronology
Phases (1981)	Hooligans (1981)	It's Hard (1982)

Professional ratings
Review scores
Source	Rating
The Encyclopedia of Popular Music	3/5 stars

Hooligans is a double compilation album by the English rock band the Who, released in September 1981 by MCA Records. It focuses on Who songs from the 1970s with only the titles "I Can't Explain", "I Can See for Miles" and "Pinball Wizard" from the 1960s. The album reached No. 52 on the US charts.

It is most notable as the first US album to include three hard to find Who singles. The 1971 UK single "Let's See Action" was not released in the US, and for this album the title was changed to "(Nothing Is Everything) Let's See Action". Two other singles, "Join Together" and "Relay", were released both in the UK and US in 1972. US releases of "Relay" were re-titled "The Relay". The version of the song on this album was edited by use of a fade that occurs about 25 seconds early.

The album title and cover design are by Richard Evans

== Track listing ==
All tracks written by Pete Townshend except where noted.

First Bunch of Hooligans
No.	Title	Original release	Length
1.	"I Can't Explain"	non-album single, 1965	2:05
2.	"I Can See for Miles"	The Who Sell Out, 1967	4:02
3.	"Pinball Wizard"	Tommy, 1969	3:00
4.	"(Nothing Is Everything) Let's See Action"	non-album single, 1971	3:56
5.	"Summertime Blues" (Eddie Cochran, Jerry Capehart)	Live at Leeds, 1970	3:23
6.	"The Relay" (edited version)	non-album single, 1972	3:28
Total length:			19:54

Second Bunch of Hooligans
No.	Title	Original release	Length
1.	"Baba O'Riley"	Who's Next, 1971	5:01
2.	"Behind Blue Eyes"	Who's Next, 1971	3:40
3.	"Bargain"	Who's Next, 1971	5:32
4.	"The Song Is Over"	Who's Next, 1971	6:11
Total length:			20:24

Third Bunch of Hooligans
No.	Title	Original release	Length
1.	"Join Together"	non-album single, 1972	4:21
2.	"Squeeze Box"	The Who by Numbers, 1975	2:41
3.	"Slip Kid"	The Who by Numbers, 1975	4:30
4.	"The Real Me"	Quadrophenia, 1973	3:21
5.	"5:15"	Quadrophenia, 1973	4:50
Total length:			19:43

Fourth Bunch of Hooligans
No.	Title	Original release	Length
1.	"Drowned"	Quadrophenia, 1973	5:06
2.	"Had Enough" (John Entwistle)	Who Are You, 1978	4:29
3.	"Sister Disco"	Who Are You, 1978	4:20
4.	"Who Are You"	Who Are You, 1978	6:21
Total length:			20:16

== Charts ==
Original album
Chart (1981)	Peak position
US Billboard 200	82

== Certifications ==
Region	Certification	Certified units/sales
United States (RIAA)	Gold	500,000^{^}
^{^} Shipments figures based on certification alone.
