= Going Mobile =

Song by The Who

Single by the Who

from the album Who's Next
- A-side: "Behind Blue Eyes" (Europe)
- Released: 6 November 1971
- Recorded: May 1971
- Studio: Olympic, London
- Length: 3:43
- Label: Decca; MCA; Track; Polydor
- Songwriter: Pete Townshend
- Producers: The Who; Glyn Johns

The Who singles chronology
"Let's See Action" (1971)	"Going Mobile" (1971)	"Join Together" (1972)

"Going Mobile" is a song written by Pete Townshend and originally released by the Who on their fifth studio album Who's Next (1971). It was originally written for Townshend's abandoned Lifehouse project, with lyrics celebrating the joy of having a mobile home and being able to travel the open road. The Who's lead singer Roger Daltrey did not take part in the recording of the song, leaving the rest of the band to record it as a power trio; Townshend handles the lead vocals, guitars, and synthesizers, with John Entwistle on bass guitar and Keith Moon on drums. The song has attracted mixed reviews from music critics. This is one of only two songs on Who's Next not to feature Daltrey. (The John Entwistle-penned composition "My Wife" was the other one)

== Lyrics and music ==
"Going Mobile" is one of the lighter moments on Who's Next. It was originally conceived as part of Townshend's abandoned Lifehouse project. Townshend described the use of the song in the proposed project as follows: "As the story unfolded, because of the vagaries of the modern world, because of pollution being caused mainly by people's need to travel, to be somewhere else. (People) had been told, 'You can't do that anymore. You have to stay where you are.' But people have got this lust for life, and adventure, and a bit of color." It celebrates the joys of having a mobile home and being able to travel the highways at will – Townshend himself had acquired a mobile home about a year before the song was recorded. An example of the theme is illustrated by such lyrics as:

I don't care about pollution
I'm an air-conditioned gypsy
That's my solution
Watch the police and the taxman miss me
I'm mobile

"Going Mobile" was recorded without Who lead singer Roger Daltrey. Rather, guitarist and songwriter Townshend handled the vocals on the song. Instrumentation includes acoustic guitar, bass guitar and drums. A VCS 3 synthesizer is also overdubbed on part of the song. Further, on his guitar solo, Townshend plays the instrument through an envelope follower, a feature of the ARP synthesizer that produces what Townshend describes as a "fuzzy wah-wah sound". Author Chris Charlesworth describes the effect as being as if Townshend is playing underwater. Allmusic critic Tom Maginnis describes Entwistle's bass playing on the song as "ultra-fluid" and Moon's drumming as "exuberant".

== Critical reception ==
Rolling Stone's John Mendelsohn described the song as "faintly inane", adding that it "celebrates the joys of, ho hum, being free to roam the highways and byways in one’s trailer". However, in The Rolling Stone Record Guide, John Swenson described "Going Mobile" as one of "Townshend's most beautiful songs". Allmusic's Tom Maginnis states that "Going Mobile" "shows the tremendous energy of the band without the support of powerful guitar amplification". Charlesworth states that "Going Mobile" "lacks the grandeur" of some other Who's Next songs, but nonetheless considers it "a witty and worthy contender".

== Other appearances ==
Townshend included a version of "Going Mobile" on his solo album The Lifehouse Chronicles. In 2011, Simon Townshend performed the song with Roger Daltrey's No Plan B band on its "Tommy Reborn" concert tour.
