= Live: The Empire =

Live album by Pete Townshend
- Released: 18 September 2000 (UK)
- Recorded: 9 November 1998
- Genre: Rock
- Label: Eelpie

Pete Townshend chronology
Lifehouse Elements (2000)	Live: The Empire (2000)	Live: Sadler's Wells (2000)

Live: The Empire is a live recording by Pete Townshend. The music was recorded at London's Shepherd's Bush Empire on 9 November 1998 and released as a double CD on 18 September 2000 by UK company Eel Pie Recording Productions Ltd. This concert marked Townshend's return to the UK stage as a solo artist after an absence of 13 years. He was backed by musicians including John "Rabbit" Bundrick, Chucho Merchán and Peter Hope Evans, as well as freestyle rapper Hame.

== Track listing ==
All songs written and composed by Pete Townshend except where noted.

No.	Title	Length
1.	"On the Road Again" (Alan Wilson/Floyd James)	5:05
2.	"A Little Is Enough"	5:16
3.	"Pinball Wizard"	2:55
4.	"Drowned"	7:29
5.	"Anyway, Anyhow, Anywhere" (Pete Townshend/Roger Daltrey)	10:45
6.	"You Better You Bet"	5:39
7.	"Behind Blue Eyes"	3:44
8.	"Baby Don't You Do It"	8:56
9.	"English Boy"	0:47
10.	"Three Steps To Heaven" (Eddie Cochran/Bob Cochran)	1:16
11.	"Mary Anne with the Shaky Hand"	1:24
12.	"Sheraton Gibson"	1:52
13.	"Substitute"	2:45
14.	"I Am An Animal"	4:01
15.	"North Country Girl" (Bob Dylan)	3:34
16.	"(She's a) Sensation" (Brian Holland/Lamont Dozier/Edward Holland Jr.)	2:35
17.	"A Friend Is a Friend"	5:52
18.	"Now and Then"	4:17
19.	"Let My Love Open the Door"	4:23
20.	"Who Are You"	13:12
21.	"The Kids Are Alright"	8:26
22.	"The Acid Queen"	3:40
23.	"Won't Get Fooled Again"	12:19
24.	"Magic Bus"	11:44
25.	"I'm One"	3:06
