= Lifehouse (rock opera) =

Unfinished rock opera by the Who

Lifehouse is an unfinished science fiction rock opera by the English rock band the Who intended as a follow-up to Tommy. It was abandoned as a rock opera in favour of creating the traditional rock album Who's Next, though its songs would appear on various albums and singles by the Who, as well as Pete Townshend's solo albums. In 1978, aspects of the Lifehouse project were revisited by the Who on Who Are You. In 2000, Townshend revived the Lifehouse concept with his set Lifehouse Chronicles and the sampler Lifehouse Elements. On 1 May 2007, he released an online software called The Lifehouse Method in which any "sitter" could create a musical "portrait". The site is now defunct. The artwork and design of the box set was undertaken by designer Laurence Sutherland. In 2023, an 11-CD box set of recordings intended or recorded around the time of the Lifehouse project was released under the name Who's Next/Lifehouse. A graphic novel detailing a version of the story was also released in the box set.

== Original concept ==
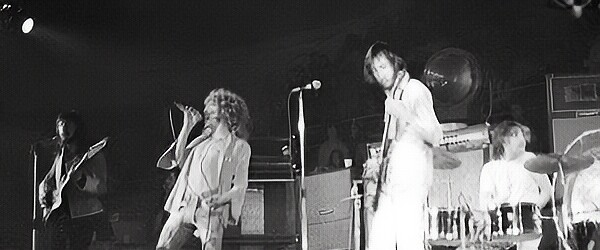
The Who on tour in 1971

Lifehouse's story was inspired by Pete Townshend's experiences on the Tommy Tour: "I've seen moments in Who gigs where the vibrations were becoming so pure that I thought the whole world was just going to stop, the whole thing was just becoming so unified." He believed that the vibrations could become so pure that the audience would "dance themselves into oblivion". Their souls would leave their bodies and they would be in a type of heaven; a permanent state of ecstasy. The only reason this did not happen at Who gigs was because there was a knowledge in the listener's mind that the show would end and everyone would wake up and go to work the next morning. These ideas were directly linked to the writing of philosopher Inayat Khan, a Sufi musician who had written about the connection of vibration and sound with the human spirit. Another source of inspiration for Townshend was Meher Baba, who claimed to be an avatar of Brahman.

What Townshend was aiming to achieve in Lifehouse was to write music that could be adapted to reflect the personalities of the audience. To do this he wanted to adapt his newly acquired hardware, VCS3 and ARP synthesisers and a four-channel quadraphonic PA system, to create a machine capable of generating and combining personal music themes written from computerised biographical data. Ultimately, these thematic components would merge to form a "universal chord". To help this process, the Who would encourage individuals to emerge from the audience and find a role in the music.

== The Lifehouse concept ==
Lifehouse began as a story written around several songs. According to Pete Townshend: "The essence of the story-line was a kind a futuristic scene ... It's a fantasy set at a time when rock 'n' roll didn't exist. The world was completely collapsing and the only experience that anybody ever had was through test tubes. In a way they lived as if they were on television. Everything was programmed. The enemies were people who gave us entertainment intravenously, and the heroes were savages who'd kept rock 'n' roll as a primitive force and had gone to live with it in the woods. The story was about these two sides coming together and having a brief battle."

Under those circumstances, a very old guru figure emerges and says, "I remember rock music. It was absolutely amazing—it really did something to people." He speaks of a kind of nirvana people reached through listening to this type of music. The old man decides that he is going to try to set it up so that the effect can be experienced eternally. Everybody would be snapped out of their programmed environment through this rock and roll-induced liberated selflessness. The Lifehouse was where the music was played, and where the young people would collect to discover rock music as a powerful catalyst – a religion as it were. "Then I began to feel 'Well, why just simulate it? Why not try and make it happen?'"

The plan was for the Who to take over the Young Vic theatre with a regular audience, develop the new material on stage and allow the communal activity to influence the songs and performances. Individuals would emerge from the audience and find a role in the music and the film. When the concerts became strong enough, they would be filmed along with other peripheral activity from the theater. A storyline would evolve alongside the music. Although the finished film was to have many fictitious and scripted elements, the concert footage was to be authentic, and would provide the driving force for the whole production.

Townshend imagined a complex scenario whereby a personal profile of each concertgoer would be compiled, from the individual's astrological chart to his hobbies, even physical appearance. All the characteristics would then be fed into a computer at the same moment, leading to one musical note culminating in mass nirvana that Townshend dubbed "a kind of celestial cacophony". This philosophy was based on the writings of Inayat Khan, a Sufi master musician who espoused the theory that matter produces heat, light, and sound in the form of unique vibrations. Taking the idea one step further, making music, which was composed of vibrations, was the pervading force of all life. Elevating its purpose to the highest level, music represented the path to restoration, the search for the one perfect universal note, which once sounded would bring harmony to the entire world. Despite Townshend's grandiose plans, the project had its problems. The theater had its own schedule of drama productions, and was not available on a regular nightly schedule that Townshend insisted was necessary for the band to sustain a "euphoric level" of performance. Townshend: "The fatal flaw ... was getting obsessed with trying to make a fantasy a reality rather than letting the film speak for itself." Eventually, Townshend had to let go of Lifehouse for his own sake.

Townshend's inability to translate the ideas in his head to those around him eventually led to a nervous breakdown. "It was a disaster." No one apart from himself actually understood the whole concept of Lifehouse. Even John Entwistle believed that the band were to actually stay at the Young Vic with the audience in a sort of commune. Kit Lambert, an integral part of the communication between the members of the Who, was missing. Townshend had rejected a Tommy film script written by Lambert, and later found out that he had told Universal Pictures (to whom Townshend had spoken regarding the making of the film) that Lifehouse was actually a new version of Tommy. Lambert, dejected, frustrated and hurt, had moved to New York. With Tommy, Lambert had served as Townshend's "interpreter", explaining "to the willing but befuddled people around me what I was on about". The film was indefinitely postponed until the album had been issued. The band went to Glyn Johns to produce their collection of songs, intended for a double album. They decided to shelve most of the songs in favour of a single album, hoping that it would have "a sharper focus and greater impact" than the concept of Lifehouse had become. In August 1978, Keith Moon said the band intended to make a Lifehouse film after the film version of Quadrophenia had been completed. In his 2012 memoir Who I Am, Pete Townshend makes reference to discussions in 1980 with director Nicolas Roeg to develop a film version of Lifehouse, implying that the project fell apart after Roeg learned Townshend made a pass at actress Theresa Russell, Roeg's partner at the time.

Townshend also revisited the concept, in modified form, in his radio play and recording Psychoderelict, which incorporated outtakes from the Lifehouse/Who's Next sessions and demos. In the plot of Psychoderelict, a reclusive rock star named Ray High is lured out of retirement by a fan-letter hoax between his manager and a gossip columnist, ultimately staging and broadcasting a virtual reality concert similar to the Lifehouse climax. He continued discussion of these themes in his later opus The Boy Who Heard Music.

In April 2019, it was announced that a graphic novel based on the Lifehouse concept was in production, with a scheduled release date of July 2020. The graphic novel was rescheduled to be released on 15 September 2023, as part of a Who's Next re-release box set. It was ultimately released in December 2023.

== Plot summary ==
Lifehouse has several variations in its storyline:

=== 1971 version ===
In the world in which the album is set, pollution is so bad that the populace are forced to wear Lifesuits, suits that could simulate all experiences in a way that no one would have to leave home.

The suits are plugged into a huge mainframe called the Grid which also contains tubes for sleeping gas, food, and entertainment; supposedly, someone could live out tens of thousands of lifetimes in a very short period within the Grid. The Grid is controlled by a man named Jumbo.

The story begins when a farming family in Scotland hear of a huge rock concert called Lifehouse occurring in London, a sort of post-apocalyptic Woodstock. Their daughter, Mary, runs away to join the concert. They don't wear Lifesuits because they are supposedly out of the pollution's range and they farm the crops that the government buys to feed the Lifesuiters. Bobby is the creator of Lifehouse. (Bobby was also the tentative name of the project for a time.) He is a hacker who broadcasts pirate radio signals advertising his concert, where the participants' personal data are taken from them and converted into music, quite literally "finding your song". At the climax of the album, the authorities have surrounded the Lifehouse; then the perfect note rings forth through the combination of everybody's songs, they storm the place to find everybody has disappeared through a sort of musical Rapture, and the people observing the concert through their Lifesuits have vanished as well.

=== 1972 additions ===
In 1972, at Daltrey's suggestion, Townshend wrote new songs related to the Lifehouse plot line. These songs included "Relay", "Join Together", and "Put the Money Down". Also three songs were apparently recorded for inclusion on the unfinished followup to Who's Next, titled Rock Is Dead—Long Live Rock! Instead, the band released "Relay" and "Join Together" as singles that year. "Put the Money Down" was not completed until 1974, when it was released on the outtakes and rarities compilation, Odds & Sods.

=== 1978 version ===
Set two hundred years after the events in the Who's Next version, this tells the story of another attempt at a Lifehouse concert. The concert holders are helped by "muso", a cult that worships music, and are hated by Plusbond, the group that runs the Grid and the Lifesuits.

=== 1999 radio play version ===
Ray and Sally are farmers who grow, as Sally said, "dead potatoes". Their daughter, Mary, runs away from home to visit a hacker who has fascinated her with pirated radio advertisements. Ray goes to try to find his lost child and along the way he meets his childhood self, Rayboy, and his imaginary friend, the caretaker.

=== 2023 graphic novel version ===
In December 2023, a graphic novel of the story, entitled Life House, was released. It features a far more apocalyptic storyline, where a tyrannical government is overseen by Jumbo 7, who bans music and plans to use a "silver child" named Valentina to weaponize sound. Mary awakens from "grid-sleep" and finds the Lifehouse, where she learns about music from a guru-like musician and hacker named Bobby and leads the concert. It features a much darker ending than any of the other versions with a nuclear theme.

== Radio play ==
Pete Townshend, along with playwright Jeff Young, completed a musical radio play script of Lifehouse as a collaboration between BBC Radio Drama and Eel Pie, Townshend's publishing company. The recorded version of this script is available on Lifehouse Chronicles, and the text is available as a Simon & Schuster Pocket Books, First Edition 1999.

The book contains the unedited radio play script of Lifehouse as well as an introduction by Townshend. The first broadcast of the radio play took place on 5 December 1999 on BBC Radio 3.

== Intended track listing ==
Below is the track listing of the 1971 version of the Lifehouse album as listed on the first two discs of Pete Townshend's Lifehouse Chronicles, without the post-1971 songs; all songs written by Townshend

Side 1 (Ray's Story)
No.	Title	Album releases	Length
1.	"Teenage Wasteland" (Townshend demo)	Lifehouse Chronicles	6:47
2.	"Going Mobile"	Who's Next	3:43
3.	"Baba O'Riley"	Who's Next	5:07
4.	"Time Is Passing"	Odds & Sods	3:31
5.	"Love Ain't for Keeping"	Who's Next	2:10

Side 2 (Mary/Jumbo's Story)
No.	Title	...	Length
6.	"Bargain"	Who's Next	5:34
7.	"Too Much of Anything"	Odds & Sods	4:23
8.	"Greyhound Girl" (Possibly recorded by the Who in 1971)	Lifehouse Chronicles	3:05
9.	"Mary" (Possibly recorded by the Who in 1971)	Scoop	4:17
10.	"Behind Blue Eyes"	Who's Next	3:42

Side 3 (Bobby's Story)
No.	Title	...	Length
11.	"I Don't Even Know Myself"	Who's Missing	4:56
12.	"Pure and Easy"	Odds & Sods	5:25
13.	"Getting in Tune"	Who's Next	4:50
14.	"Let's See Action (Nothing Is Everything)"	Hooligans	4:00

Side 4 (The Lifehouse Concert)
No.	Title	...	Length
15.	"Won't Get Fooled Again"	Who's Next	8:33
16.	"The Song Is Over"	Who's Next	6:15

== Intended personnel ==
The Who

- Pete Townshend – songwriter, guitar, keyboards, synthesizer, banjo, vocals
- Roger Daltrey – lead vocals, harmonica, percussion
- John Entwistle – bass guitar, trumpet, French horn, vocals
- Keith Moon – drums, percussion

Additional personnel

- Nicky Hopkins – piano, Hammond organ

== Related albums ==
- 1971: Who's Next released by the Who
- 1972: Who Came First released by Pete Townshend
- 1974: Odds & Sods released by the Who
- 1975: The Who by Numbers released by the Who
- 1978: Who Are You released by the Who
- 1981: Hooligans released by the Who
- 1982: It's Hard released by the Who
- 2000: Lifehouse Chronicles released by Pete Townshend
- 2000: Lifehouse Elements released by Pete Townshend
- 2012: Method Music released by Lawrence Ball
- 2023: Who's Next / Life House [Super Deluxe Edition] released by The Who

== See also ==
- Smile (Beach Boys album)
- Get Back (Beatles album)
- Songs From the Black Hole
