= Love Ain't for Keeping =

Song by The Who

Song by the Who

from the album Who's Next
- Released: 14 August 1971
- Recorded: Spring 1971,
- Studio: Olympic, London
- Length: 2:10
- Label: Decca (US); Polydor (UK)
- Songwriter: Pete Townshend
- Producers: The Who; Glyn Johns

"Love Ain't for Keeping" is a song written by Pete Townshend and originally released by the Who on their fifth studio album Who's Next (1971). Its themes include the joy of physical love, the power of nature and the need to live for the moment.

== Music and lyrics ==
At two minutes and ten seconds, "Love Ain't for Keeping" is the shortest song on Who's Next. It is also one of the lightest songs on the album, and one of the few not to use synthesizers. However, an earlier version of the song, recorded in New York City with Kit Lambert producing, was more of a hard rock song, and included synthesizers as well as electric guitars (with Leslie West guesting on lead guitar). The hard rock version appears on reissues of Odds and Sods and on the deluxe version of Who's Next, and was used as the concert opener for Who live shows for some shows in 1971. A live recording, from a concert at the Young Vic in 1971, appears on the deluxe version of Who's Next.

"Love Ain't for Keeping" was originally conceived as part of Townshend's abandoned Lifehouse project, and the demo version (which, like the hard rock version, includes synthesizers) appears on Lifehouse Chronicles. The song (referring to the best-known version on Who's Next) has been described as "a blues-tinged country love song". The lyrics project optimism and contentment and the themes of the song include the peaceful joy of physical love, the power of nature and the need to live for the moment, indeed to share love rather than "keep" it. For example, the lyrics include:

Rain is coming down
But I know the clouds will pass
...
Lay down beside me
Love ain't for keeping.

The song has a bouncy tempo. The instrumentation of "Love Ain't for Keeping" is dominated by multitracked acoustic guitars, played by Townshend, including an acoustic guitar solo. Keith Moon's drumming is more restrained than usual. Moon plays a Ludwig drum kit on this song, rather than his usual Premier kit. John Entwistle's bass playing is also relatively restrained. Allmusic critic Tom Maginnis describes Roger Daltrey's vocal as using a "clear, soaring voice", and singing sweetly for the line "Lay down beside me/Love ain't for keeping." "Love Ain't for Keeping" segues into the following song on Who's Next, "My Wife".

== Critical reception ==
Rolling Stone described "Love Ain't for Keeping" as "faintly pretty but negligible".

== Other versions ==
A version of "Love Ain't for Keeping" appeared on the 1998 reissue of the Who's Odds and Sods album. Townshend included a version of the song on his solo album The Lifehouse Chronicles. Milton Mapes covered the song on the 2004 album Who and Who.

== Personnel ==
- Roger Daltrey – lead vocals
- Pete Townshend – backing vocals, acoustic guitar
- John Entwistle – bass guitar
- Keith Moon – drums
