= Join Together (The Who song) =

Single by the Who
- B-side: "Baby Don't You Do It" (Live)
- Released: 16 June 1972
- Recorded: 22 May 1972
- Studio: Olympic, London
- Genre: Rock
- Length: 4:20
- Label: Track (UK); Decca (US)
- Songwriter: Pete Townshend
- Producers: The Who; Glyn Johns (associate producer)

The Who singles chronology
"Behind Blue Eyes" (1971)	"Join Together" (1972)	"Relay" (1972)

"Join Together" is a song by the English rock band the Who, first released as a non-album single in June 1972. The song has since been performed live multiple times and has appeared on numerous compilation albums. It was the last Who single to be released in the United States which used the Decca Records color bar label.

"Join Together" is also notable for its roots in the Who's abandoned Lifehouse album, a quality shared by another of the Who's 1972 singles, "Relay".

== Background ==
Townshend planned to use the song as part of the Lifehouse album, which was never released. Following the abandoning of Lifehouse, "Join Together", as well as other songs initially intended to appear on the album, was used in the working track list of another cancelled Who album, Rock Is Dead—Long Live Rock!.

The song was eventually recorded on the same day as "Relay" (its follow-up single) and a demo of "Long Live Rock" in May 1972. Roger Daltrey remembers the song positively, but claims that he was initially sceptical about using a synthesizer.

I remember when Pete came up with "Join Together". I quite liked it as a single, it's got a good energy to it. But at the time I was still very doubtful about bringing in the synthesizer. I felt that, with a lot of songs, we'd end up spending so much time creating these piddly one-note noises that it would've been better just doing it on guitar. I mean, I'm a guitar man. I love the guitar; to me it's the perfect rock instrument. I don't think Pete did much with those sequencing things that he couldn't have done on his guitar anyway.

— Roger Daltrey

With the definitive title of "Join Together", the song was released as a non-album single in 1972, backed with a live and unedited version of Marvin Gaye's "Baby Don't You Do It", recorded at San Francisco's Civic Auditorium on 13 December 1971. The single was successful, reaching number 9 on the British singles chart and number 17 on the US Billboard Hot 100. It is also the band's highest-charting song in Switzerland. The single was the second of three non-album singles relating to the aborted Lifehouse project, the others being "Let's See Action" and "Relay".

The song has been included on several compilations, including Hooligans, The Singles, The Who: The Ultimate Collection, 20th Century Masters: The Millennium Collection: The Best of The Who and The Who Hits 50!.

=== Promotion ===
A video shot in June 1972 shortly after completing the song featured The Who miming to playback in front of an excited audience. Roger Daltrey and Keith Moon play Jew's harps and Pete Townshend and John Entwistle play chord and bass harmonicas respectively to mime to all the instruments played by Townshend. Also during the video, Townshend and Daltrey's hands are bandaged.

The promotional film premiered in the U.S. on American Bandstand on 9 December 1972.

== Live performances ==
The song was first performed live in their 1975 tour and 1976 tour, albeit more bluesy and abbreviated while attached to "My Generation"; it was played in this same arrangement early in the 1979 tour. It was performed once on the 1982 tour, tagged on to the end of "Magic Bus". For the 1989 tour, it was brought back, this time in the same arrangement as the studio version. On 13 January 2011, the band played this song with guests Debbie Harry, Jeff Beck and Bryan Adams as the show-closer for The Concert for Killing Cancer benefit show. It has also been played at almost every show of their The Who Hits 50! world tour. The band have also played the song in 2019.

== Personnel ==
- Roger Daltrey – lead vocals, harmonica
- Pete Townshend – guitar, synthesizer, jew's harp, backing vocals
- John Entwistle – bass, backing vocals
- Keith Moon – drums

== UK/US 7" single track listing ==
- Side A: "Join Together" (4:22)
- Side B: "Baby Don't You Do It" (Live) (6:09)

== Chart performance ==
Chart (1972)	Peak position
Belgium (Ultratop 50 Wallonia)	30
Canada (RPM)	18
Switzerland (Hitparade)	9
UK Singles (OCC)	9
US Billboard Hot 100	17
West Germany (Media Control)	23
