= My Wife (song) =

Song by The Who

Song by the Who

from the album Who's Next
- A-side: "Baba O'Riley" (Europe); "Behind Blue Eyes" (US)
- Released: 6 November 1971
- Recorded: May 1971
- Studio: Olympic (Barnes, London)
- Genre: Hard rock
- Length: 3:40
- Label: Decca
- Songwriter: John Entwistle
- Producers: The Who; Glyn Johns

Official audio
- "My Wife" on YouTube

"My Wife" is a song by the English rock band the Who, written and sung by bass guitarist John Entwistle. It was originally released in 1971 on Who's Next and later as the B-side of the single "Baba O'Riley" on 6 November 1971 in Europe by Polydor Records.

== Background ==
"My Wife" was the fourth track on Who's Next and was recorded at Olympic Studios sometime in May 1971. While it did appear on Who's Next', it was thought that it was not a part of the Lifehouse project, which was confirmed in 2000 when it was not included in Pete Townshend's Lifehouse Chronicles box set. "My Wife" was written to replace "Boris the Spider" during live performances, as Entwistle had grown tired of performing the latter in concert.

=== Song structure ===
"My Wife" is arguably John Entwistle's highlight on Who's Next, being that he takes on the lead vocals, bass guitar, piano, and horn section. Unusually, this song does not feature a guitar solo, which is most likely because Entwistle could only "write on bass guitar or in my head, just transfer it to manuscript paper, or piano", and did not play the guitar proficiently. Instead of a guitar solo, in the longer breaks between verses there is a horn part by Entwistle. This song is in the key of B major.

== Personnel ==
The Who

- Pete Townshend – guitar
- John Entwistle – lead vocals, bass guitar, piano, brass
- Keith Moon – drums

== The Kids Are Alright soundtrack version ==
"My Wife (Live at Gaumont State Theatre)"

Song by the Who

from the album The Kids Are Alright
- A-side: "Long Live Rock"
- Released: 1 April 1979
- Recorded: 15 December 1977
- Venue: Gaumont State Theatre (Kilburn, London)
- Genre: Hard rock
- Length: 5:58
- Label: Polydor
- Songwriter: John Entwistle
- Producer: The Who

Official audio
- "My Wife" (Live at Gaumont State Theatre) on YouTube

In 1979 "My Wife" was again released as a B-side single, this time to "Long Live Rock". This version was recorded live and released on The Kids Are Alright. What is rare about this version is that it was the only song released from the Who's 1977 concert at the Gaumont State Theatre in London. The rest of the songs were not released until 2008 on the DVD The Who at Kilburn: 1977. The song is unlike the studio version as it has a guitar solo by Townshend but no piano or horns.

== Live and compilation appearances ==
The song was performed first on the Who's Next Tour and quickly became a live staple until Entwistle's death in 2002. It is featured on the following live and compilation albums by the Who:

- Who's Greatest Hits (1983)
- Two's Missing (1987)
- Thirty Years of Maximum R&B (1994)
- Blues to the Bush (2000)
- The Ultimate Collection (2002)
- Live at the Royal Albert Hall (2003)
- View from a Backstage Pass (2007)

== John Entwistle solo versions ==
Around October–November 1972, Entwistle re-recorded the song and released it on his third solo studio album Rigor Mortis Sets In (1973). A live version of the song was featured on the two-CD compilation album So Who's the Bass Player? The Ox Anthology, released on 22 March 2005 by Sanctuary Records.

== Critical reception ==
During an interview Pete Townshend described "My Wife" as "the best new rock number on the album [Who's Next]." Critic Mark Deming called "My Wife" the "comic relief" on Who's Next. Rob Mitchum of Pitchfork called it "the only listenable song of [Entwistle's] writing career."

Because of excessive live performances John Entwistle wrote "The Quiet One" to replace this song, although he would still perform the song for his solo career and his later performances with the Who.

In 2016, Rolling Stone ranked the song number 21 on its list of the 50 greatest songs by the Who.

== See also ==
- "Heaven and Hell"
- "Boris the Spider"
- "The Ox"
