= Who's Next =

1971 studio album by the Who

Studio album by the Who
- Released: 2 August 1971
- Recorded: April–June 1971
- Studios: Olympic, London, England; Stargroves, East Woodhay, England (Rolling Stones Mobile Studio)
- Genres: Hard rock; arena rock
- Length: 43:33
- Labels: Track (UK); Decca (US)
- Producers: The Who; Glyn Johns (associate producer); Kit Lambert (tracks 10, 11, 16)

The Who chronology
Live at Leeds (1970)	Who's Next (1971)	Meaty Beaty Big and Bouncy (1971)

Singles from Who's Next
- 1. "Won't Get Fooled Again" Released: 25 June 1971; 2. "Baba O'Riley" Released: October 1971 (Europe); 3. "Behind Blue Eyes" Released: October 1971 (US)

Who's Next is the fifth studio album by the English rock band the Who, released on 2 August 1971, by Track Records in the United Kingdom and by Decca Records in the United States. It developed from the aborted Lifehouse project, a multi-media rock opera conceived by the group's guitarist Pete Townshend as a follow-up to the band's 1969 album Tommy. The project was cancelled owing to its complexity and to conflicts with Kit Lambert, the band's manager, but the group salvaged some of the songs, without the connecting story elements, to release as their next album. Eight of the nine songs on Who's Next were from Lifehouse, with the lone exception being the John Entwistle–penned "My Wife". Ultimately, the remaining Lifehouse tracks would all be released on other albums or as standalone singles throughout the next decade.

The Who recorded Who's Next with assistance from recording engineer Glyn Johns. After producing the song "Won't Get Fooled Again" in the Rolling Stones Mobile Studio, they relocated to Olympic Studios to record and mix most of the album's remaining songs. They made prominent use of synthesisers on the album, particularly on "Won't Get Fooled Again" and "Baba O'Riley", which were both released as singles. The cover photo was shot by Ethan Russell; it made reference to the monolith in the 1968 film 2001: A Space Odyssey, as it featured the band standing by a concrete pillar protruding from a slag heap, apparently having urinated against it.

The album was an immediate critical and commercial success and has since been viewed by many critics as the Who's best album, as well as one of the greatest albums of all time. It has been reissued on CD several times, often with additional songs originally intended for Lifehouse included as bonus tracks. In 2020, Who's Next was ranked number 77 on Rolling Stone's list of the "500 Greatest Albums of All Time".

== Background ==
By 1970, the Who had obtained significant critical and commercial success, but they had started to become detached from their original audience. The mod movement had vanished, and the original followers from Shepherd's Bush had grown up and acquired jobs and families. The group had started to drift apart from manager Kit Lambert, owing to his preoccupation with his label, Track Records. They had been touring since the release of Tommy the previous May, with a set that contained most of that album, but realised that millions had now seen their live performances, and Pete Townshend in particular recognised that they needed to do something new. A single, "The Seeker", and a live album, Live at Leeds, were released in 1970, and an EP of new material ("Water", "Naked Eye", "I Don't Even Know Myself", "Postcard", and "Now I'm a Farmer") was recorded, but not released, as the band felt it would not be a satisfactory follow-up to Tommy.

Instead, the group tackled a project called Lifehouse. This evolved from a series of columns Townshend wrote for Melody Maker in August 1970, in which he discussed the importance of rock music, and in particular what the audience could do. Of all the group, he was the most keen to use music as a communication device, and wanted to branch out into other media, including film, to get away from the traditional album/tour cycle. Townshend has variously described Lifehouse as a futuristic rock opera, a live-recorded concept album and as the music for a scripted film project. The basic plot was outlined in an interview Townshend gave to Disc and Music Echo on 24 October 1970. Lifehouse is set in the near future in a society in which music is banned and most of the population live indoors in government-controlled "experience suits". A rebel, Bobby, broadcasts rock music into the suits, allowing people to remove them and become more enlightened. Some elements accurately describe future technology; for example, The Grid resembles the internet and "grid sleep" resembles virtual reality.

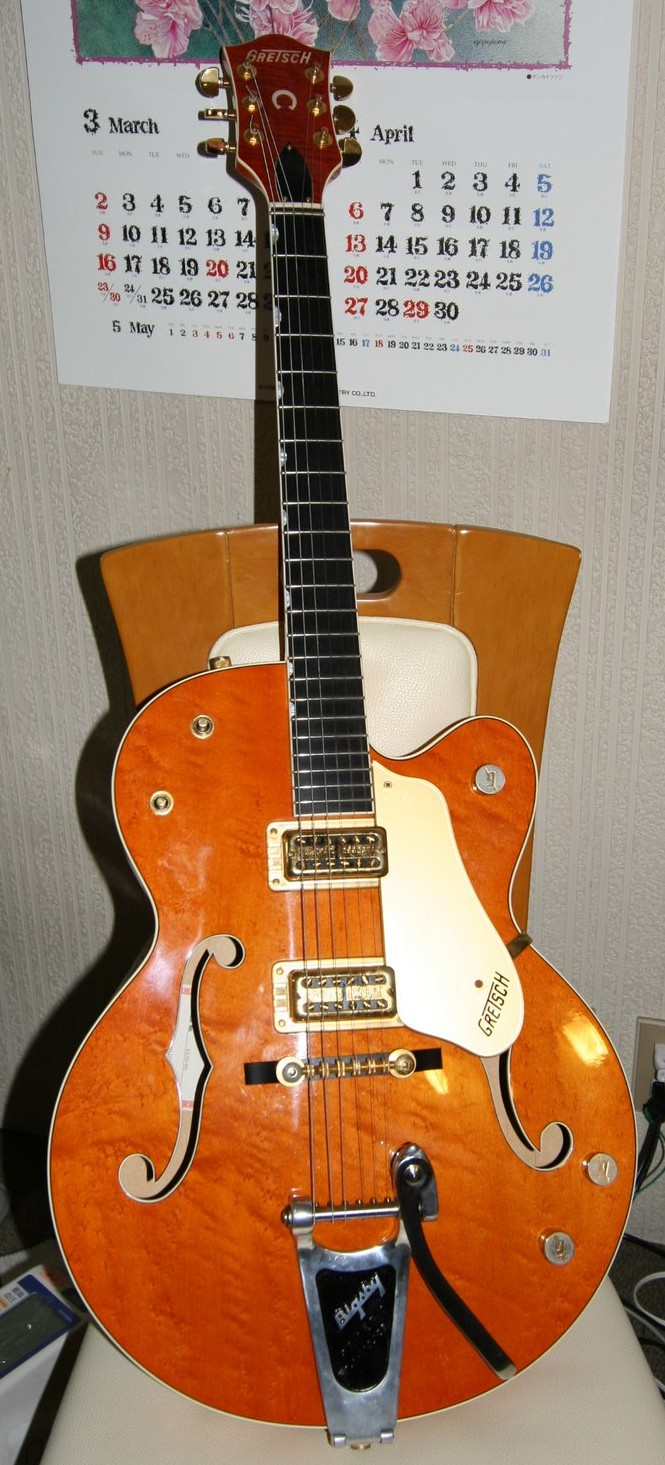
Pete Townshend was given a Gretsch 6120 guitar by Joe Walsh in early 1971, and it became his main electric instrument for Who's Next

The group held a press conference on 13 January 1971, explaining that they would be giving a series of concerts at the Young Vic theatre, where they would develop the fictional elements of the proposed film along with the audience. After Keith Moon had completed his work on the film 200 Motels, the group performed their first Young Vic concert on 15 February. The show included a new quadrophonic public address system which cost £30,000; the audience was mainly invited from various organisations, such as youth clubs, with only a few tickets on sale to the general public.

After the initial concerts, at Lambert's suggestion the group flew to New York to make studio recordings at Record Plant Studios. They were joined by guests Al Kooper on Hammond organ, Ken Ascher on piano, and Leslie West on guitar. Townshend used a 1957 Gretsch guitar, given to him by Joe Walsh, during the session; it went on to become his main guitar for studio recording. Lambert's participation in the recording was minimal, and he proved to be unable to mix the final recordings. He had started taking hard drugs, while Townshend was drinking brandy regularly. After returning to Britain, engineer Glyn Johns made safety copies of the Record Plant material, but decided it would be better to re-record the album from scratch at Olympic Sound Studios in Barnes.

The group gave two more concerts at the Young Vic on 25 and 26 April, which were recorded on the Rolling Stones Mobile Studio by Andy Johns, but Townshend grew disillusioned with Lifehouse and further shows were cancelled. Audiences at the Young Vic gigs were not interested in interacting with the group to create new material, but simply wanted the Who to play "My Generation" and smash a guitar. The project proved to be intractable on several levels, and caused stress within the band, as well as a major falling-out between Townshend and Lambert. Years later, in the liner notes to the remastered CD, Townshend wrote that the failure of the project led him to the verge of a nervous breakdown. At the time, Roger Daltrey said the Who "were never nearer to breaking up".

Although the Lifehouse concept was abandoned, scraps of the project remained in the final album, including the use of synthesizers and computers. An early concept for Lifehouse featured the feeding of personal data from audience members into the controller of an early analogue synthesizer to create a "universal chord" that would have ended the proposed film. Abandoning Lifehouse gave the group extra freedom, owing to the absence of an overriding musical theme or storyline (which had been present in Tommy). This allowed the band to concentrate on maximising the impact of individual tracks and providing a unifying sound for them.

Townshend continued to develop the concepts of the Lifehouse project, revisiting them in later albums, including a 6-CD set, The Lifehouse Chronicles, in 1999. In 2007, he launched a (now defunct) website called The Lifehouse Method to accept personal input from applicants that would be turned into musical portraits.

== Recording and production ==
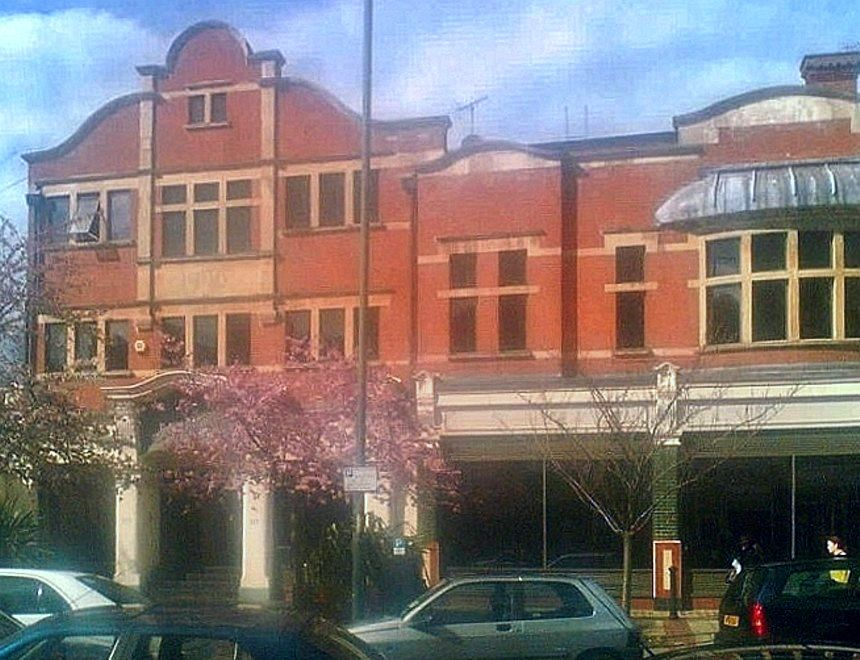
Most of Who's Next was recorded at Olympic Studios in Barnes with Glyn Johns.

The first session for what became Who's Next was at Mick Jagger's house, Stargroves, at the start of April 1971, using the Rolling Stones Mobile. The backing track of "Won't Get Fooled Again" was recorded there before the band decided to relocate recording to Olympic at Johns' suggestion; the first session there was on 9 April, attempting a basic take of "Bargain". The bulk of the sessions occurred during May, when the group recorded "Time Is Passing", "Pure and Easy", "Love Ain't for Keeping" (which had been reworked from a rock track into an acoustic arrangement), "Behind Blue Eyes", "The Song Is Over", "Let's See Action" and "Baba O'Riley". Nicky Hopkins guested on piano, while Dave Arbus was invited by Moon to play violin on "Baba O'Riley". John Entwistle's "My Wife" was added to the album very late in the sessions, having been originally intended for a solo album.

In contrast to the Record Plant and Young Vic sessions, recording with Johns went well, as he was primarily concerned with creating a good sound, whereas Lambert had always been more preoccupied with the group's image; Townshend recalled: "we were just getting astounded at the sounds Glyn was producing". Townshend used early synthesizers and modified keyboard sounds in several modes, including as a drone effect on several songs, notably "Baba O'Riley" and "Won't Get Fooled Again", but also "Bargain", "Going Mobile", and "The Song Is Over". The synthesizer was used as an integral part of the sound, as opposed to providing gloss, as was the case on other artists' albums up to that point. Moon's drumming has a distinctly different style from earlier albums, being more formal and less reliant on long drum fills—partly owing to the synthesizer backing, but also due to the no-nonsense production techniques of Johns, who insisted on a good recording performance that used flamboyance only when truly necessary. Johns was instrumental in convincing the Who that they should simply put a single-disc studio album out, believing the songs to be excellent. The group gave him free rein to assemble an album of whatever songs he wanted, in any order. Despite Johns' key contributions, he only received an "associate producer" credit on the finished album, though he maintained he acted mainly in an engineering capacity and based most of the arrangements on Townshend's original demos.

The album opened with "Baba O'Riley", featuring piano and a Lowrey organ by Townshend. The song's title pays homage to Townshend's guru, Meher Baba, and minimalist composer Terry Riley, and it is informally known as "Teenage Wasteland", in reference to a line in the lyrics. The organ track came from a longer demo by Townshend, portions of which were later included on a Baba tribute album I Am, that was edited down for the final recording. Townshend later said this part had "two or three thousand edits to it". The opening lyrics to the next track, "Bargain" ("I'd gladly lose me to find you") came from a phrase used by Baba. Entwistle wrote "My Wife" after having an argument with his wife, exaggerating the conflict in the lyrics. The track features several overdubbed brass instruments recorded in a single half-hour session. "Pure and Easy", a key track from Lifehouse, did not make the final track selection, but the opening line was included as a coda to "The Song Is Over".

"Behind Blue Eyes" featured three-part harmony by Daltrey, Townshend, and Entwistle and was written for the main antagonist in Lifehouse, Jumbo. Moon, uncharacteristically, did not appear on the first half of the track, which was later described by Who biographer Dave Marsh as "the longest time Keith Moon was still in his entire life." The closing track, "Won't Get Fooled Again", was critical of revolutions. Townshend explained: "a revolution is only a revolution in the long run and a lot of people are going to get hurt". The song features the Lowrey organ fed through an EMS VCS 3 synthesizer, which came from Townshend's original demo and was re-used for the finished track.

== Cover art ==
The front cover of the album is a photograph, taken on 4 July 1971 on the way from Sheffield to Leicester, of the band apparently having just collectively urinated on a large concrete pillar protruding from a slag heap. The idea to shoot the picture came from Entwistle and Moon discussing Stanley Kubrick and the film 2001: A Space Odyssey. According to photographer Ethan Russell, only Townshend actually urinated against the pillar, so rainwater was tipped from an empty film canister to achieve the desired effect. Most of the height of pillar has now been buried, and the area converted to farmland. It is marked on Google Maps as Who’s Next Monolith, and its what3words location is send.refreshed.rainy. The pillar is “a drain built into the spoil heap from Bond’s Main colliery to help prevent landslips”. The sky in the background was added later by John Kosh, who was the art director, to give the image what Russell called "this other worldly quality". The rear cover shows the band backstage at De Montfort Hall, Leicester, amid a cluttered mess of furniture. In 2003, the television channel VH1 named the cover of Who's Next one of the greatest album covers of all time.

Other suggestions for the cover included the group urinating against a Marshall Stack and an overweight nude woman with the Who's faces in place of her genitalia. An alternative cover featuring Moon dressed in black lingerie and a brown wig and holding a whip was later used as part of the inside art of the 1995 and 2003 CD releases of the album. Some of the photographs taken during these sessions were also used as part of Decca's United States promotion of the album.

== Release and promotion ==
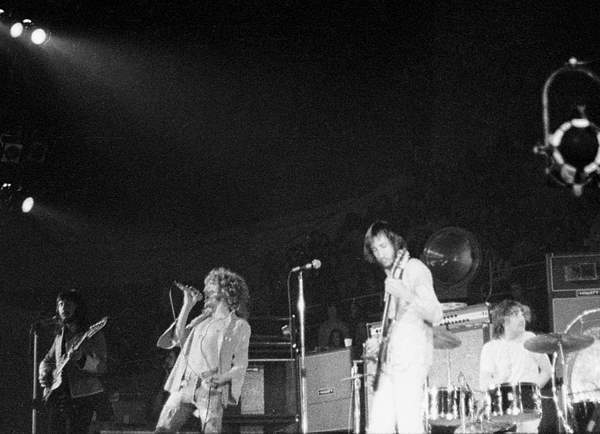
The Who playing in Charlotte, North Carolina, shortly after Who's Next was released

The lead single from the album, "Won't Get Fooled Again" (edited down to three and a half minutes), was released ahead of the album on 25 June 1971 in the UK and in July in the US; it reached No. 9 and No. 15 in the charts of the respective countries. The album was released on 2 August in the US and on 27 August in the UK. It became the only album by the Who to top the UK charts.

The Who started touring the US just before the album was released. They used the Lifehouse PA, though soundman Bob Pridden found the technical requirements of the equipment to be over-complicated. The set list was revamped, and, while it included a smaller selection of numbers from Tommy, several songs from the new album, such as "My Wife", "Baba O'Riley", and "Won't Get Fooled Again", became live favourites. The latter two songs involved the band playing to a backing track containing the synthesizer parts. The tour moved to the UK in September, including a show at The Oval in Kennington in front of 35,000 fans and the opening gig at the Rainbow Theatre in Finsbury Park, before going back to the US, ending in Seattle on 15 December. The group then took eight months off touring, the longest break of their career at that point.

Several songs recorded at the Who's Next sessions, but not included on the album, were later released as singles or on compilations. "Let's See Action" was released as a single in 1971, while "Pure and Easy" and "Too Much of Anything" were released on Odds & Sods, and "Time is Passing" was added to the 1998 CD version of that album. The longest version of the cover "Baby Don't You Do It" from the sessions that is currently available is on the 2003 deluxe edition of Who's Next.

The album has been re-issued and remastered several times using tapes from different sessions. The master tapes for the Olympic sessions are believed to be lost, as Virgin Records threw out a substantial number of old recordings when they purchased the studio in the 1980s. Video game publisher Harmonix wanted to release Who's Next as downloadable, playable content for the music video game series Rock Band, but were unable to do so due to their inability to find the original multitrack recordings. Instead, a compilation of Who songs dubbed The Best of The Who, which includes three of the album's songs ("Behind Blue Eyes", "Baba O'Riley", and "Going Mobile") was released as downloadable content. The 16-track tapes for "Won't Get Fooled Again" and the 8-track tapes for the other material, except for "Bargain" and "Getting in Tune", have since been discovered.

== Critical reception and legacy ==
Professional ratings
Review scores
Source	Rating
AllMusic	5/5 stars
Christgau's Record Guide	A
Encyclopedia of Popular Music	5/5 stars
Mojo	4/5 stars
MusicHound Rock	5/5
Q	4/5 stars
The Rolling Stone Album Guide	5/5 stars
Tom Hull – on the Web	A+
The Village Voice	A+

Reviewing for The Village Voice in 1971, music critic Robert Christgau called Who's Next "the best hard rock album in years" and said that, while their previous recordings were marred by a thin sound, the group now "achieves the same resonant immediacy in the studio that it does live". Billy Walker from Sounds highlighted the songs "Baba O'Riley", "My Wife", and "The Song Is Over", and wrote: "After the unique brilliance of Tommy something special had to be thought out and the fact that they settled for a straight-forward album rather than an extension of their rock opera, says much for their courage and inventiveness." Rolling Stone magazine's John Mendelsohn felt that, despite some amount of seriousness and artificiality, the album's brand of rock and roll is "intelligently-conceived, superbly-performed, brilliantly-produced, and sometimes even exciting". At the end of 1971, the record was voted the best album of the year in the Pazz & Jop, an annual poll of American critics published by The Village Voice.

Retrospectively, Who's Next has often been viewed as the Who's best album. In a review for AllMusic, Stephen Thomas Erlewine said its music was more genuine than Tommy or the aborted Lifehouse project because "those were art – [Who's Next], even with its pretensions, is rock & roll." BBC Music's Chris Roberts cited it as the band's best record and "one of those carved-in-stone landmarks that the rock canon doesn't allow you to bad-mouth." Mojo claimed its sophisticated music and hook-laden songs featured innovative use of rock synthesizers that did not weaken the Who's characteristic "power-quartet attack". In The Encyclopedia of Popular Music (1998), Colin Larkin said the album raised the standards for both hard rock and the Who, whose "sense of dynamics" was highlighted by the contrast between their powerful playing and a counterpoint produced at times by acoustic guitars and synthesizer obbligatos. Christgau, on the other hand, was less enthusiastic about the record during the 1980s, when the Who became what he felt was "the worst kind of art-rock band", writing that Who's Next revealed itself to be less tasteful in retrospect because of Daltrey's histrionic singing and "all that synth noodling".

In 2003, Rolling Stone ranked it 28th on its list of the 500 greatest albums of all time; it maintained this rank on the 2012 edition of the list, and was ranked 77th on the 2020 edition. It appeared at number 15 on Pitchfork Media's 2004 list of the 100 best records from the 1970s, and was included in the book 1001 Albums You Must Hear Before You Die (2005). The Classic Albums BBC documentary series aired an episode on Who's Next, initially on radio in 1989, and then on television in 1998, which was released in 2006 on DVD as Classic Albums: The Who – Who's Next. That year, it was chosen by Time as one of the 100 best albums of all time. In 2007, the album was inducted into the Grammy Hall of Fame for "lasting qualitative or historical significance". It was voted number 48 in the third edition of Colin Larkin's All Time Top 1000 Albums.

== Track listing ==
All tracks are written by Pete Townshend, except "My Wife" by John Entwistle.

Side one
No.	Title	Lead vocal	Length
1.	"Baba O'Riley"	Daltrey (verses); Townshend (bridge)	5:08
2.	"Bargain"	Daltrey (verses, chorus); Townshend (bridge)	5:34
3.	"Love Ain't for Keeping"	Daltrey	2:10
4.	"My Wife"	Entwistle	3:41
5.	"The Song Is Over"	Townshend (verses, bridge, coda); Daltrey (chorus, coda)	6:14
Total length:			22:47

Side two
No.	Title	Lead vocal	Length
1.	"Getting in Tune"	Daltrey	4:50
2.	"Going Mobile"	Townshend	3:42
3.	"Behind Blue Eyes"	Daltrey	3:42
4.	"Won't Get Fooled Again"	Daltrey	8:32
Total length:			20:46 43:33

Bonus tracks (1995 reissue)
No.	Title	Length
10.	"Pure and Easy"	4:19
11.	"Baby Don't You Do It"	5:13
12.	"Naked Eye" (live at the Young Vic, 26 April 1971)	5:22
13.	"Water" (live at the Young Vic, 26 April 1971)	6:25
14.	"Too Much of Anything"	4:24
15.	"I Don't Even Know Myself"	4:54
16.	"Behind Blue Eyes" (original version)	3:25
Total length:		34:02 77:35

== Personnel ==
The Who

- Roger Daltrey – vocals
- Pete Townshend – guitars, vocals, VCS 3, Lowrey organ, ARP, piano on "Baba O'Riley"
- John Entwistle – bass, vocals, brass, piano on "My Wife"
- Keith Moon – drums, percussion

Additional musicians

- Nicky Hopkins – piano on "The Song Is Over" and "Getting in Tune"
- Dave Arbus – violin on "Baba O'Riley"
- Al Kooper – Hammond organ on alternate version of "Behind Blue Eyes"
- Leslie West – lead guitar on Record Plant sessions on "deluxe edition" including "Baby, Don't You Do It" and "Love Ain't for Keeping" (electric version)

Production

- The Who – production
- Glyn Johns – associate production, recording, mixing
- Doug Sax – mastering
- Kit Lambert – executive production
- Chris Stamp – executive production
- Pete Kameron – executive production
- John Kosh – album design
- Ethan Russell – photography
- Steven Wilson – multichannel mixes for the 2023 Who's Next / Life House deluxe set

== Charts ==
=== Weekly charts ===
1971 weekly chart performance for Who's Next
Chart (1971)	Peak position
Australian Albums (Kent Music Report)	3
Canada Top Albums/CDs (RPM)	5
Danish Albums (Hitlisten)	3
Dutch Albums (Album Top 100)	2
Finnish Albums (Suomen virallinen lista)	9
German Albums (Offizielle Top 100)	18
Norwegian Albums (VG-lista)	6
UK Albums (Official Charts)	1
US Billboard 200	4

=== Yearly charts ===
2013 weekly chart performance for Who's Next
Chart (2013)	Peak position
Italian Albums (FIMI)	100

2014 weekly chart performance for Who's Next
Chart (2014)	Peak position
US Billboard Top Pop Catalog	7

2020 weekly chart performance for Who's Next
Chart (2020)	Peak position
Belgian Albums (Ultratop Wallonia)	156

2023 weekly chart performance for Who's Next
Chart (2023)	Peak position
Austrian Albums (Ö3 Austria)	38
Belgian Albums (Ultratop Flanders)	173
Belgian Albums (Ultratop Wallonia)	30
German Albums (Offizielle Top 100)	14
Japanese Albums (Oricon)	35
Japanese Hot Albums (Billboard Japan)	46
Spanish Albums (Promusicae)	77
Swedish Physical Albums (Sverigetopplistan)	5
Swiss Albums (Schweizer Hitparade)	39

== Certifications ==
Certifications for Who's Next
Region	Certification	Certified units/sales
Italy (FIMI)	Platinum	50,000^{‡}
United Kingdom (BPI) release of 1993	Platinum	300,000^{‡}
United States (RIAA)	3× Platinum	3,000,000^{^}
^{^} Shipments figures based on certification alone.^{‡} Sales+streaming figures based on certification alone.
