= Getting in Tune =

Song by the Who

from the album Who's Next
- Released: 14 August 1971
- Recorded: 7 June 1971
- Studio: Olympic, London
- Length: 4:50
- Label: Decca (US); Polydor (UK)
- Songwriter: Pete Townshend
- Producers: The Who; Glyn Johns

"Getting in Tune" is a song written by Pete Townshend and originally released by the Who on their fifth studio album Who's Next (1971). It was originally written as part of Townshend's abandoned Lifehouse project. Its lyrics describe the power of music, as well as reflect the inner contradictions Townshend was feeling at the time between his spiritual needs and his persona as a rock star. The music incorporates a number of changes in tempo and has been praised by critics for its use of dynamics.

== Lyrics and music ==
"Getting in Tune" was originally conceived as part of Townshend's abandoned Lifehouse project. The song's lyrics begin by noting that the singer doesn't really have anything to say. Rather he claims that "I'm singing this note 'cause it fits in well with the chords I'm playing/I can't pretend there's any meaning hidden in the things I'm saying." However, the singer is fed up with this superficiality, and thus is "Getting in tune to the straight and narrow." Music critic Robert Christgau considers this line the real theme of the Who's Next album. Another line notes that "I'm going to tune right in on you." It is left ambiguous whether he is referring to a woman or a spiritual figure. The lyrics reflect the contradictions Townshend was feeling between his desire for spirituality and self-understanding against his persona as a hard-drinking hard-partying rock star. Along with the previous song on Who's Next, "The Song Is Over", "Getting in Tune" also incorporates a theme of the power of music, both socially and spiritually. Author Chris Charlesworth interprets the song as using a band tuning up for a show as a metaphor for creating harmony among diverse groups.

The music begins with session musician Nicky Hopkins playing a gentle tune on the piano while John Entwistle plays bass. Roger Daltrey sings the opening lines softly, but explodes on the line "I'm going to tune right in on you", supported by Keith Moon's drum fills. The music then relaxes again. There is a duet in which Daltrey exchanges the line "Getting in tune to the straight and narrow" with Townshend (low harmony) and Entwistle (high harmony), a section Allmusic critic Tom Maginnis considers "the song's catchiest hook." However, the music becomes more frantic again towards the end. Moon provides laid back drumming throughout most of the song, but speeds up for the frantic portion of the song at the end. Unlike many other songs on Who's Next, the instrumentation for "Getting in Tune" does not include synthesizers.

== Critical reception ==
Rolling Stone critic John Mendelsohn praises the dynamics of the song in the way it alternates lyrical passages with more powerful rock passages, increasing the effect of both. Mendelsohn also praises Daltrey's singing. Allmusic critic Tom Maginnis praises the song's arrangement as "brilliant" and praises "the band's mastery of dynamics, tension, and release techniques coalescing seamlessly with strong, memorable melodies." Authors Steve Grantley and Alan Parker call the song "an accomplished mid-tempo Beatlesque number" and state that the "spiritually questing lyrics are matched by some strong playing", particularly singling out Hopkins' piano playing and Moon's drumming. Chris Charlesworth calls the song "another fearless rocker" and "a showcase for Roger [Daltrey] at his absolute best."

In 2016, Rolling Stone ranked the song number 8 on its list of the 50 greatest songs by the Who.

== Other appearances ==
"Getting in Tune" was included on the soundtrack to Jerry Maguire.

The song was performed live by the Who in February 1971, before the release of Who's Next, at shows at the Young Vic, but has been played live sparingly since. Although the song was not often played live since 1971, it was included on the 2003 live album Live at the Royal Albert Hall. Townshend included a version of the song on his solo album The Lifehouse Chronicles.
