= Baby Don't You Do It =

Original song written and composed by Holland–Dozier–Holland

Single by Marvin Gaye

from the album How Sweet It Is to Be Loved by You
- B-side: "Walk on the Wild Side"
- Released: September 2, 1964
- Recorded: August 1 & 4, 1964
- Genre: Rhythm and blues; soul
- Length: 2:30
- Label: Tamla
- Songwriter: Holland–Dozier–Holland
- Producers: Brian Holland; Lamont Dozier

Marvin Gaye singles chronology
| "Try It Baby" (1964) | "Baby Don't You Do It" (1964) | "What Good Am I Without You" (1964) |

"Baby Don't You Do It" is a 1964 single by American singer Marvin Gaye. Released on the Tamla label, this song discusses a man who is at a standstill with his girlfriend, who he feels is neglecting his love stating "Don't break my heart/...I've tried to do my best".

Featured on the Holland–Dozier–Holland-written and produced track, for the first time on a Marvin Gaye record, were Motown's top session girl group, the Andantes. The song was originally written and intended for the Supremes, but eventually reassigned to Marvin Gaye to record.

In October 1964 Gaye's single peaked at number 27 on both the Billboard Hot 100 and the Top 100 singles chart in Cashbox, with Cashbox affording the single a number 14 peak on its R&B chart (Billboard was not maintaining an R&B chart at this time).

Billboard stated that "it's that powerhouse beat that can't be beat." Cash Box described it as "an electrifying pleader that rocks along in sensational vocal and instrumental fashion."

== Personnel ==
- Lead vocals by Marvin Gaye
- Background vocals by the Andantes: Marlene Barrow, Jackie Hicks and Louvain Demps
- Instrumentation by the Funk Brothers
  - Baritone saxophone by Mike Terry

== The Band versions ==
The Band recorded the song numerous times under the title "Don't Do It". The lead singer was Levon Helm, with backing vocals by Rick Danko and Richard Manuel. Different versions, both studio and live, appear on several of their albums and box sets, including the 1972 live release Rock of Ages. "Don't Do It" was the encore performed by The Band in Martin Scorsese's 1976 concert film The Last Waltz, though it was featured first in the film. Although it was not included on the 1978 soundtrack album, the track was included in the 2002 box set edition of The Last Waltz soundtrack.

The version of "Don't Do It" from Rock of Ages was issued as a single, reaching No. 34 on the Billboard Hot 100 in the autumn of 1972; the track was the second - following "Up on Cripple Creek" - and final Top 40 single for the Band. Billboard called this version a "dynamite dance treatment". Record World called it "a funky rocker that fits The Band to a tee."

== The Who versions ==
"Baby Don't You Do It"

Single by The Who
- A-side: "Join Together"
- Released: 16 June 1972 (UK); 8 July 1972 (US)
- Recorded: December 13, 1971
- Venue: Civic Auditorium, San Francisco
- Genre: Rock, hard rock
- Length: 6:09
- Label: Track Records (UK); MCA (US)
- Songwriter: Holland-Dozier-Holland
- Producers: The Who; Glyn Johns

The Who recorded several versions of "Baby Don't You Do It". The first version released was recorded live in San Francisco and released as the B-side to "Join Together" in June 1972. The group had previously played the song in their live performances circa 1964–65, and a studio recording from that time was later released on the 1998 remastered CD of Odds & Sods.

The Who also recorded a studio version of the song on March 16, 1971, at The Record Plant in New York. This version became first available on the 1995 Reissue of Who's Next and featured Leslie West on lead guitar, but was edited to 5:13. The full version (8:21) of the song became available on the Who's Next Deluxe Edition. During the sixth season of That '70s Show when the show's episodes were all named after recordings by the Who, the March 3, 2004, broadcast was entitled "Baby Don't You Do It". In 2025 The Who released Live at the Oval 1971, which featured the song as track No. 10.
