= The Song Is Over =

Song by the Who

from the album Who's Next
- Released: 14 August 1971
- Recorded: 11 May 1971
- Studio: Olympic, London
- Length: 6:13
- Label: Decca (US); Polydor (UK)
- Songwriter: Pete Townshend
- Producers: The Who; Glyn Johns

"The Song Is Over" (or "Song Is Over") is a song by the English rock band the Who, appearing on their fifth studio album Who's Next (1971). It was originally to be the ending song on Lifehouse. It takes place after the police invade the Lifehouse Theatre and the concert goers disappear.

== Lyrics and music ==
"The Song Is Over" is one of the tracks on Who's Next with lead vocals by both Pete Townshend and Roger Daltrey and piano work by Nicky Hopkins. According to Pete Townshend, the song provides "a mixture of being sad and wistful but at the same time a high point." That mixture is achieved by Townshend's vocals conveying a sense of the end: "The song is over, It's all behind me", and Daltrey's conveying a sense of continuing: "I sing my songs to the wide open spaces ...." Who biographer John Atkins remarks that the two singers' "contrasting voices" "work wonderfully well." Atkins considers Daltrey's vocals to be the song's strongest feature, but he also praises Keith Moon's "superbly controlled" drumming, John Entwistle's "expressive" bass and the "beautiful, rich synthesizer chords on verses." The music is based on a chord progression that Mike Segretto said is "sad and hopeful" and "guaranteed to jerk tears".

According to Segretto, with metaphors about singing his farewell song to "wide open spaces," "sky high mountains," and "the infinite sea," the song "poetically indicates that a heart may break but it will endure as nature does." Atkins interprets the song as being about the "concept of song" itself and forming the climax of the Lifehouse concept by being about "the power of song being finally harnessed as a unifying strength." Indeed, Atkins identifies "The Song Is Over," "Getting in Tune" (also released on Who's Next) and "Pure and Easy" (later released on Odds and Sods) as being the three songs that are most central to the Lifehouse concept in that they "reflect the central idea of music as a source of social and spiritual power." The song also features quotes from "Pure and Easy" in its final bars.

== Critical reception ==
Rolling Stone critic John Mendelsohn rates "The Song Is Over" as being among Daltrey's and Townshend's best work, describing it as "an unutterably beautiful song" in which Townshend sings exquisitely over a gentle piano background before and in between Daltrey charging in exhilaratingly over a hard part with breathtaking chord changes in the manner of the "Listening to you I hear the music . . ." refrain from Tommy. Music critic Chris Charlesworth calls "The Song Is Over" "among the most gorgeous ballads Pete [Townshend] has ever written." Allmusic critic Stephen Thomas Erlewine similarly describes it as a "gorgeous" ballad. Rolling Stone critic Dave Marsh describes it as an "exceptionally fine song." Segretto considers it "one of the Who's most beautiful songs" and Rolling Stone Record Guide, 2nd edition editor John Swenson concurred that it was one of Townshend's most beautiful songs. In the 4th edition of the Rolling Stone Album Guide, critic Mark Kemp described it as a "great Daltrey vocal vehicle." Atkins describes it as "a mature composition, structured with an almost baroque tidiness and order."
