= Bargain (song) =

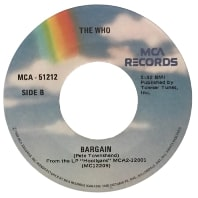

Song by The Who

from the album Who's Next
- A-side: "Had Enough"
- Released: 14 August 1971
- Recorded: April – June 1971
- Studio: Olympic, London
- Genre: Hard rock
- Length: 5:34
- Label: Decca (US); Polydor (UK)
- Songwriter: Pete Townshend
- Producers: The Who; Glyn Johns

"Bargain" is a song written by Pete Townshend that was first released by the Who on their fifth studio album Who's Next (1971). It is a love song, although the intended subject of the song is God rather than a woman. The song has been included on several compilation and live albums. It was also included on several of Townshend's solo projects. Critics have praised the song's lyricism and power, as well as the performance of the band on the song. Townshend acknowledged during the Who's concert at the Prudential Center in Newark on 19 March 2016 that this is his favorite song on the album.

== Lyrics and music ==
"Bargain" is a love song. The opening lines are:

I'd gladly lose me to find you
I'd gladly give up all I had
To find you I'd suffer anything and be glad

The lyrics are typical love song lyrics in which the singer says he will give up everything to win his love, and that the singer would consider that a bargain. However, the lyrics do not identify who the subject of the singer's love is. Townshend has stated the song was influenced by Indian mystic Meher Baba and that the subject of the song is God. Townshend has stated "The song is simply about losing one's ego as a devotee of Meher Baba. I constantly try to lose myself and find him. I'm not very successful, I'm afraid, but this song expresses how much of a bargain it would be to lose everything in order to be at one with God."

"Bargain" begins with a gentle acoustic guitar part played by Townshend. A drone is played softly in the background. The energy picks up with Keith Moon's drum fills and Townshend's rhythm guitar chords before Roger Daltrey begins to sing the lyrics. Daltrey sings most of the lyrics energetically and powerfully, but there is a gentler section sung by Townshend. In this gentler section, backed by John Entwistle's bass guitar, Townshend starts by singing:

I sit looking 'round
I look at my face in the mirror
I know I'm worth nothing without you

The line "I know I'm worth nothing without you" in particular shows the influence of Meher Baba's teachings. Other themes of the song include the search for self-identity and the balance within the human psyche of the id and the ego.

Instrumentation of "Bargain" includes an ARP synthesizer, which is used both as a solo instrument and as a backing instrument while Townshend plays a guitar solo. That guitar solo was praised by Rolling Stone critic John Mendelsohn, as well as by the Who authors Chris Charlesworth, Steve Grantley and Alan Parker. Moon's drum fills have also been heavily praised, as have Entwistle's bass lines. Townshend used several guitars on "Bargain", including a 1959 Gretsch Chet Atkins guitar that he received from Joe Walsh, as a gift.

At least nine versions of "Bargain" were recorded between April and June 1971. Townshend was particularly effusive in his praise for the sound associate producer Glyn Johns was able to achieve, particularly for the acoustic guitars.

== Critical reception ==
John Swenson of Rolling Stone described "Bargain" as one of "Townshend's most beautiful songs". Author John Atkins praised song's strength and melody as well as the Who's performance of the song. Atkins goes on to say that "'Bargain' radiates sheer dynamism and excitement, and the brilliance of the playing turns the song into a masterpiece." AllMusic critic Tom Maginnis calls "Bargain" one of the "explosively dynamic tracks found on the Who's seminal Who's Next album".

== Other appearances ==
A live performance of "Bargain" from San Francisco on 12 December 1971, was included on the 1985 the Who album Who's Missing. This version was later included in the compilation album Thirty Years of Maximum R&B in 1994. The studio version was included on the compilation album The Ultimate Collection in 2002.

Pete Townshend included solo recordings of "Bargain" on his albums Scoop and The Lifehouse Chronicles.

== Personnel ==
- Roger Daltrey – lead vocals
- Pete Townshend – acoustic guitar, electric guitar, ARP synthesizer, co-lead vocals
- John Entwistle – bass guitar
- Keith Moon – drums
