= Baba O'Riley =

1971 song by Pete Townshend; first performed by The Who

Single by the Who

from the album Who's Next
- B-side: "My Wife"
- Released: October 1971
- Recorded: May 1971
- Studio: Olympic (London)
- Genre: Hard rock; art rock
- Length: 5:00
- Label: Polydor
- Songwriter: Pete Townshend
- Producer: The Who

The Who singles chronology
"Let's See Action" (1971)	"Baba O'Riley" (1971)	"Behind Blue Eyes" (1971)

Audio
- "Baba O'Riley" on YouTube

"Baba O'Riley" is a song by the English rock band the Who, written by guitarist and principal songwriter Pete Townshend. It is the opening track to the Who's fifth studio album, Who's Next (1971). In Europe, it was released as a single in October 1971, coupled with "My Wife". Performances of "Baba O'Riley" appear on several Who live albums.

Widely regarded as one of the Who's finest songs and as one of the greatest rock songs of all time, "Baba O'Riley" appears in Time's "All-Time 100 Songs" list, Rolling Stone's list of "The 500 Greatest Songs of All Time", and the Rock and Roll Hall of Fame as one of the 500 Songs That Shaped Rock and Roll.

== Background and composition ==
Townshend wrote "Baba O'Riley" for his Lifehouse project, a rock opera intended as the followup to the Who's 1969 opera Tommy. In Lifehouse, a Scottish farmer named Ray would have sung the song at the beginning as he gathered his wife Sally and his two children to begin their move to London. When Lifehouse was scrapped, eight of the songs were salvaged and recorded for the Who's fifth studio album Who's Next (1971), with "Baba O'Riley" as the lead-off track. The song title refers to two of Townshend's primary inspirations at the time: Indian spiritual master Meher Baba and American minimalist composer Terry Riley.

According to Townshend, at the end of the band's gig at the 1969 Isle of Wight Festival, the field was covered in rubbish left by fans, which inspired the line "teenage wasteland". In another interview, Townshend said the song was also inspired by "the absolute desolation of teenagers at Woodstock, where audience members were strung out on acid and 20 people had brain damage. The irony was that some listeners considered the song a teenage celebration: 'Teenage Wasteland, yes! We're all wasted!'"

== Recording ==
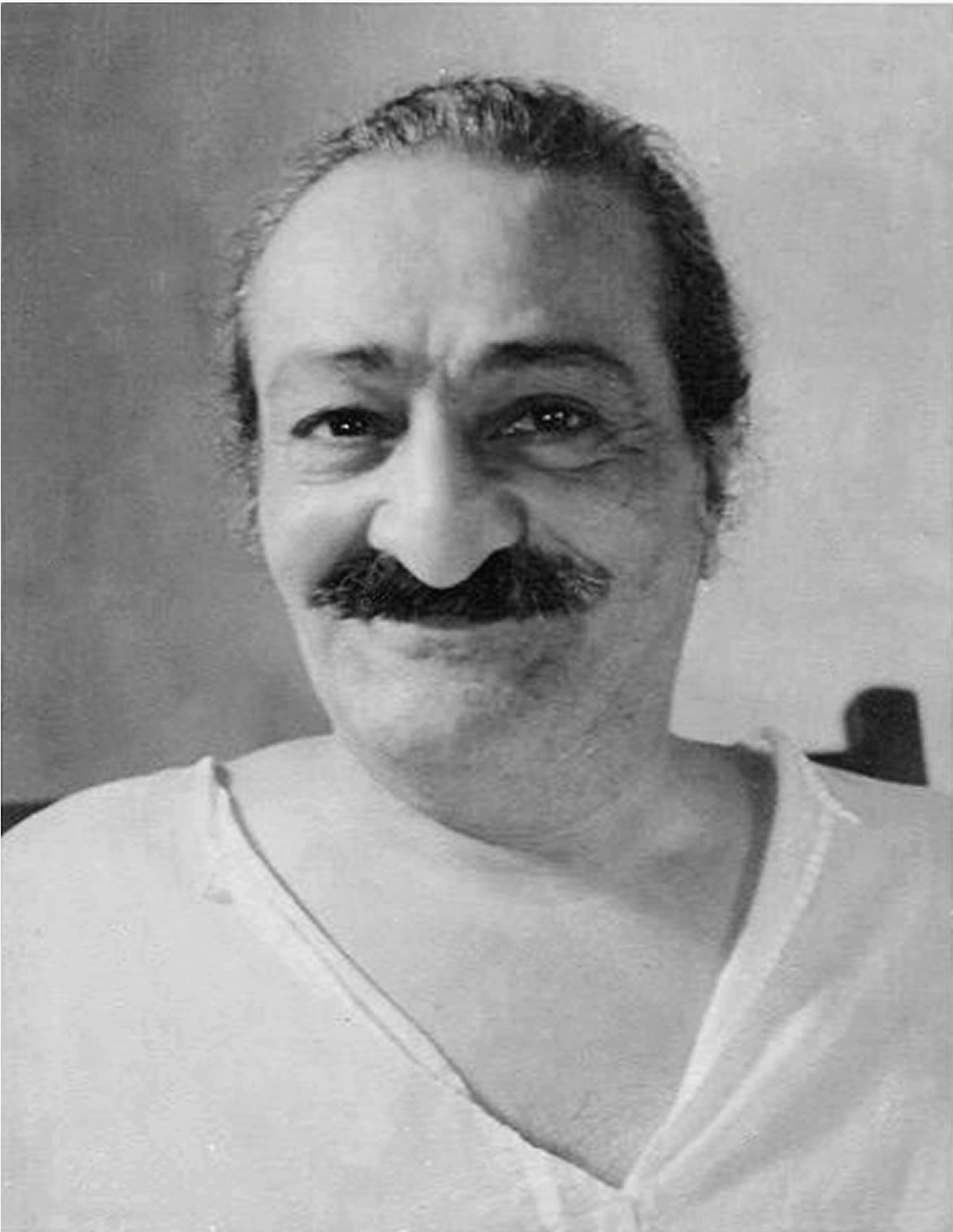
Meher Baba (1894–1969)

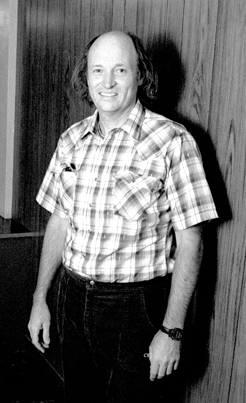
Terry Riley (born 1935)

The eponyms of "Baba O'Riley"

The set of notes in "Baba O'Riley" that opens and underlies the song was derived from the Lifehouse concept, where Townshend wanted to input the vital signs and personality of Meher Baba into a synthesiser, which would then generate music based on that data. When this idea fell through, Townshend instead recorded a Lowrey Berkshire Deluxe TBO-1 organ using its marimba repeat feature to generate them.

The song was derived from a nine-minute demo, which the band reconstructed. "Baba O'Riley" was initially 30 minutes in length, but was edited down to the "high points" of the track for Who's Next.

== Release ==
"Baba O'Riley" was released in November 1971 as a single in several European countries. However, in the United Kingdom and the United States, it was released only as part of the album Who's Next. The song became one of the band's most popular songs, as well as a popular staple of AOR radio, and remains on the classic rock radio canon.

== Critical reception ==
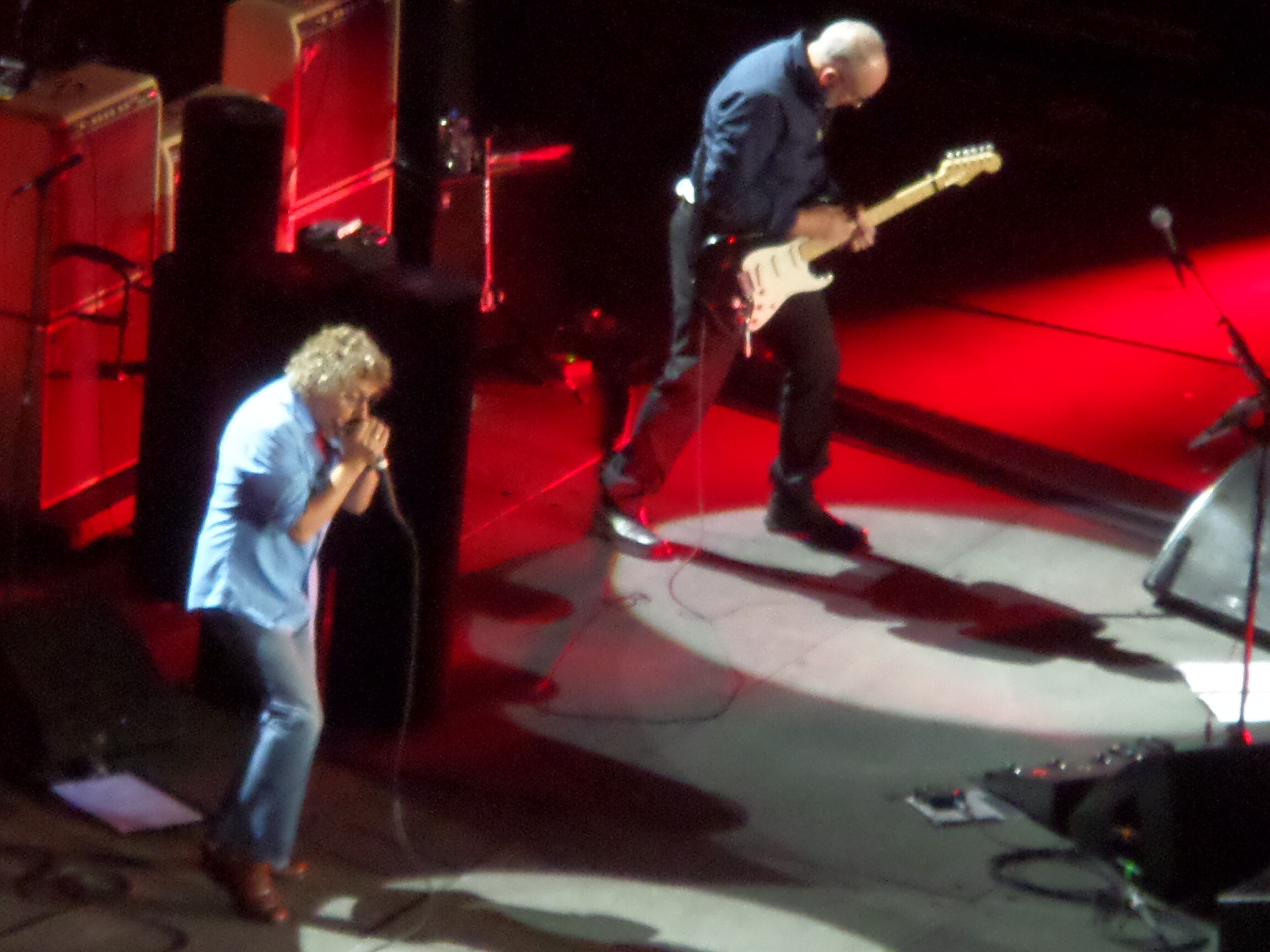
The Who performing "Baba O'Riley" live at Manchester Arena in 2014. Roger Daltrey, left, is playing harmonica during the song's climactic outro. Pete Townshend, right, is playing guitar.

"Baba O'Riley" appears at No. 159 on Rolling Stone's list of "The 500 Greatest Songs of All Time". The song was chosen by the Rock and Roll Hall of Fame as one of the 500 Songs That Shaped Rock and Roll. The band Pearl Jam regularly plays a cover of the song during concerts, and a readers' poll in Rolling Stone awarded this cover as No. 8 on a list of "Greatest Live Cover Songs". In 2012, Paste ranked the song number two on its list of the 20 greatest Who songs, and in 2022, Rolling Stone ranked the song number six on its list of the 50 greatest Who songs.

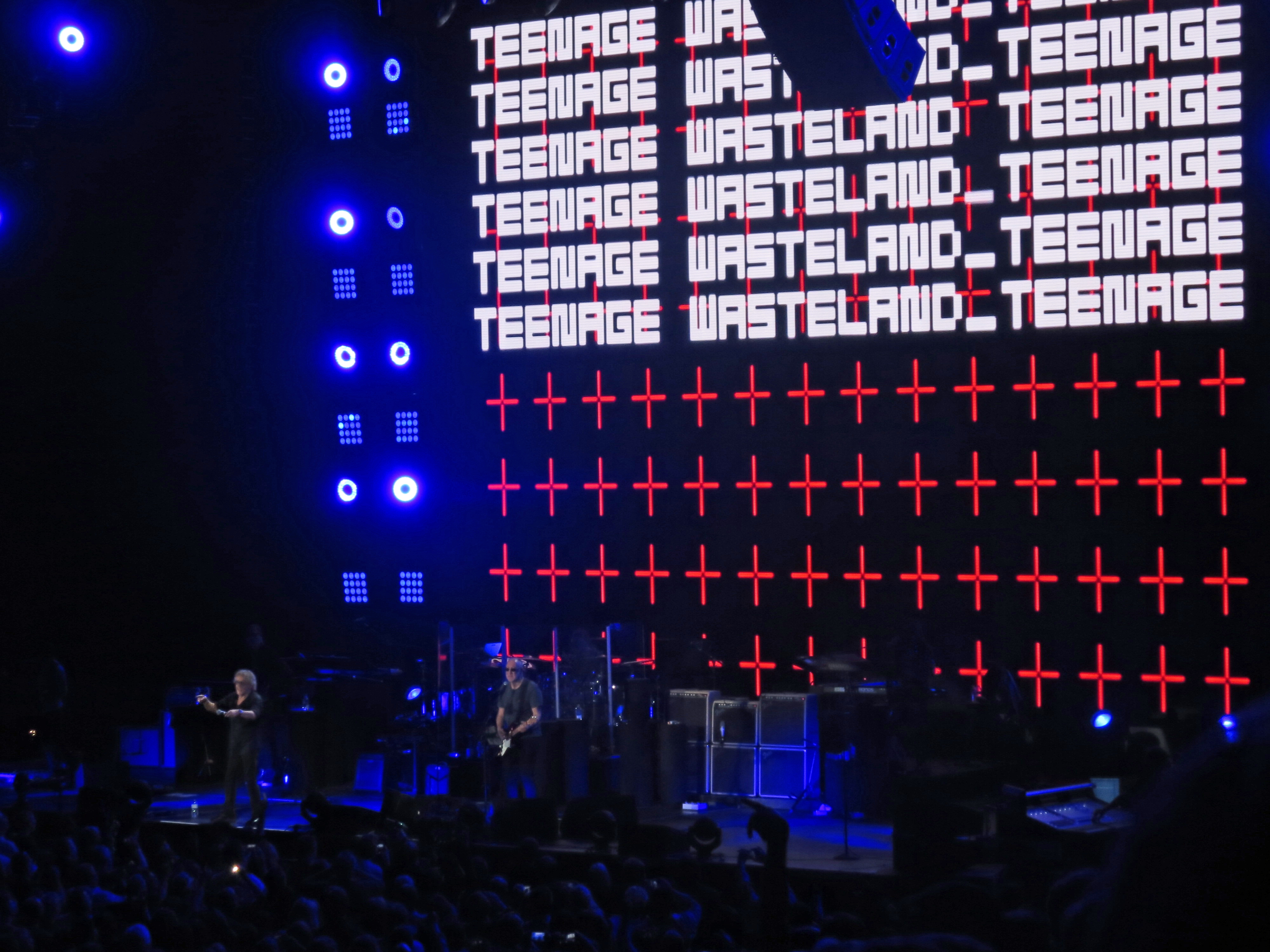
The song's "Teenage Wasteland" line displayed electronically at a Who concert in 2015.

== Legacy ==
The keyboard part was sampled by Big Audio Dynamite II for their 1991 single "Rush". "Baba O'Riley" was used as the theme song for the television series CSI: NY (2004–2013), with each CSI series using a Who song as its theme. The song was also used in the One Tree Hill episode "Pictures of You" (season 4, episode 13). The live version of the song from the album Who's Last (1984) plays in the opening segment of the Miami Vice episode "Out Where the Buses Don't Run" (season two, 1985). One of the working titles of That '70s Show (1998–2006) was "Teenage Wasteland", a reference to the repeated lyric in the song. The song was also used in the trailers for films such as A Bug's Life (1998), American Beauty (1999) and The Peanuts Movie (2015), along with season 3 of Stranger Things. The song was also sung in the Sense8 first-season episode entitled "W. W. N. Double D?" by Riley's father at the airport. An episode of Joe Pera Talks With You focuses on the fictionalized version of Pera becoming obsessed with the song. AEW wrestler Will Ospreay used the song before his AEW World Championship victory at AEW All In 2026.

In October 2001, the Who gave a much-lauded performance of the song at the Concert for New York City. Since 2003, "Baba O'Riley" has been played during player introductions for the Los Angeles Lakers during home games at the Staples Center. The song is played before live UFC events during a highlight package showing some of the most famous fights in the mixed martial arts company's history. The song was used for the trailer of the EA Sports UFC 4 game. It is also the official theme song of competitive eater Joey Chestnut.

At both the opening and closing ceremonies of the 2012 Summer Olympics, the 120 BPM dance track "The Road Goes on Forever" by the Welsh electronic music producer High Contrast, which samples "Baba O'Riley", is used during the countdown at the start of the proceedings. "Baba O'Riley" was then performed by the Who as their first number during the last musical segment at the closing ceremony, with Roger Daltrey singing a changed lyric of "Don't cry/Just raise your eye/There's more than teenage wasteland".

In the course of a debate on Twitter, it was noted that "Best Song Ever" (2013) by One Direction bore a strong resemblance to the basic structure of "Baba O'Riley". Pete Townshend responded to the claims by denying that the Who were pursuing legal action, and stated that he was a fan of One Direction's single and was happy that One Direction appeared to have been influenced by the Who, just as he had been influenced by earlier musicians such as Eddie Cochran.

== Personnel ==
=== The Who ===
- Roger Daltrey – lead vocals; harmonica (live versions only)
- Pete Townshend – Lowrey organ, synth, piano, guitars, co-lead vocals
- John Entwistle – bass guitar
- Keith Moon – drums

=== Additional personnel ===
- Dave Arbus – violin

== Charts ==
1972 chart performance for "Baba O'Riley"
Chart (1972)	Peak position
Australia (Kent Music Report)	80
Netherlands (Dutch Top 40)	13
Netherlands (Single Top 100)	11

2012 chart performance for "Baba O'Riley"
Chart (2012)	Peak position
France (SNEP)	200
UK Singles (Official Charts)	55

== Certifications ==
Certifications for "Baba O'Riley"
Region	Certification	Certified units/sales
Italy (FIMI)	Platinum	50,000^{‡}
United Kingdom (BPI)	Platinum	600,000^{‡}
^{‡} Sales+streaming figures based on certification alone.
