= Let's See Action =

Single by the Who
- B-side: "When I Was a Boy" (John Entwistle)
- Released: 15 October 1971 (UK)
- Recorded: 1971
- Genre: Folk rock; power pop
- Length: 3:57
- Label: Track; Polydor
- Songwriter: Pete Townshend
- Producer: The Who

The Who singles chronology
"Won't Get Fooled Again" (1971)	"Let's See Action" (1971)	"Baba O'Riley" (1971)

Official audio
- "Let's See Action" on YouTube

"Let's See Action" is a song written and composed by Pete Townshend and recorded by the English rock band the Who. It was released as a single in the UK on 15 October 1971 and peaked at No. 16 on the UK singles chart.

== Song notes ==
The song is the first of three non-album singles by the Who, that were intended for the aborted Lifehouse project. Pete Townshend's demo version, which appears on his debut solo studio album Who Came First (1972) as "Nothing Is Everything (Let's See Action)", is longer than the version on the single and contains the additional lines, "Rumor has it minds are open. Then rumors fill them up with lies." The band's bassist, John Entwistle, said that the track was Pete Townshend "Trying to talk to the kids in general." According to the Who's biographer John Atkins, the song takes ideas from the teachings of Meher Baba, encompassing "Soul searching and the utilization of positive impulses from within."

== B-side ==
The B-side of the single was "When I Was a Boy", which was written and sung by John Entwistle. According to John Atkins, this song is a lament about lost childhood and coping with adulthood that follows.

== Charts and releases ==
The single was released in the UK on 15 October 1971. It reached No. 16 on the UK singles chart. "Let's See Action" was also released as a single in several other countries, but not in the US, where it remained unreleased until its inclusion on the double compilation album Hooligans (1981). "Let's See Action" was also remixed by Jon Astley and Andy Macpherson for the Thirty Years of Maximum R&B box set in 1994. "When I Was a Boy" was released on CD on Polydor's Rarities Volume I & Volume II (1983), and MCA's Who's Missing (1985). "Let's See Action" has since been included on the compilation albums My Generation: The Very Best of The Who (1996) and The Who Hits 50! (2014). A 5:11-length "unedited original mix" appears on the fifth disc of the Who's Next: Life House Super Deluxe edition released in 2023.

== Live performances ==
"Let's See Action" was performed at the Royal Albert Hall in 2000 with Eddie Vedder sharing lead vocals with Roger Daltrey. This performance later appeared on the live album Live at the Royal Albert Hall (2003).

== Personnel ==
The Who

- Roger Daltrey – lead vocals (verses)
- Pete Townshend – guitar, synthesiser, lead vocals (bridge)
- John Entwistle – bass guitar, French horn
- Keith Moon – drums

Additional musician

- Nicky Hopkins – piano
