= Won't Get Fooled Again =

1971 single by the Who

Single by the Who

from the album Who's Next
- B-side: "I Don't Even Know Myself"
- Released: 25 June 1971 (UK)
- Recorded: April–May 1971
- Studio: Rolling Stones Mobile, Stargroves, England; Olympic, London
- Genre: Hard rock; progressive rock
- Length: 8:32 (album version); 3:36 (single edit)
- Label: Track (UK); Decca (US)
- Songwriter: Pete Townshend
- Producers: The Who; Glyn Johns (associate producer)

The Who singles chronology
"See Me, Feel Me" (1970)	"Won't Get Fooled Again" (1971)	"Let's See Action" (1971)

"Won't Get Fooled Again" is a song by the English rock band the Who, written by guitarist and primary songwriter Pete Townshend. It was released as a single in June 1971, reaching the top 10 in the UK, while the full eight-and-a-half-minute version appears as the final track on the band's fifth studio album Who's Next, released that August. In the US, the single entered Billboard on 17 July, reaching No. 15.

Townshend wrote the song as a closing number of the Lifehouse project, and the lyrics criticise revolution and power. The track is known for a staccato keyboard figure, played on a simple home organ fed through a synthesizer. The Who tried recording the song in New York in March 1971, but re-recorded a superior take at Stargroves the next month using the organ from Townshend's original demo. Ultimately, Lifehouse as a project was abandoned in favour of Who's Next, a straightforward album, where it also became the closing track. It has been performed as a staple of the band's setlist since 1971, often as the set closer, and was the last song drummer Keith Moon played live with the band.

As well as being a hit, the song has achieved critical praise, appearing as one of Rolling Stone's The 500 Greatest Songs of All Time. It has been covered by several artists, such as Van Halen, who took their version to No. 1 on the Billboard Album Rock Tracks chart. It has been used for several TV shows and films and in some political campaigns.

== Background ==
The song was originally intended for a rock opera on which Townshend had been working, Lifehouse, which was a multi-media exercise based on his followings of the Indian religious avatar Meher Baba, showing how spiritual enlightenment could be obtained via a combination of band and audience. The song was written for the end of the opera, after the main character, Bobby, is killed and the "universal chord" is sounded. The main characters disappear, leaving behind the government and army, who are left to bully each other. Townshend described the song as one "that screams defiance at those who feel any cause is better than no cause". He later said that the song was not strictly anti-revolution despite the lyric "We'll be fighting in the streets", but stressed that revolution could be unpredictable, adding, "Don't expect to see what you expect to see. Expect nothing and you might gain everything." Bassist John Entwistle later said that the song showed Townshend "saying things that really mattered to him, and saying them for the first time".

The song's message is summarized in the last line "Meet the new boss, same as the old boss." Townshend was influenced to write the composition by an incident at Woodstock when he chased Abbie Hoffman off the stage, who had commandeered the microphone during a break in the band's performance. He explained to Creem in 1982, "I wrote 'Won't Get Fooled Again' as a reaction to all that – 'Leave me out of it: I don't think your lot would be any better than the other lot!' All those hippies wandering about thinking the world was going to be different from that day. As a cynical English arsehole, I walked through it all and felt like spitting on the lot of them, and shaking them and trying to make them realise that nothing had changed and nothing was going to change."

Townshend had been reading Universal Sufism founder Inayat Khan's The Mysticism of Sound and Music, which referred to spiritual harmony and the universal chord, which would restore harmony to humanity when sounded. Townshend realised that the newly emerging synthesizers would allow him to communicate these ideas to a mass audience. He had met the BBC Radiophonic Workshop which gave him ideas for capturing human personality within music. Townshend interviewed several people with general practitioner-style questions, and captured their heartbeat, brainwaves and astrological charts, converting the result into a series of audio pulses. For the demo of "Won't Get Fooled Again", he linked a Lowrey organ into an EMS VCS 3 filter that played back the pulse-coded modulations from his experiments. He subsequently upgraded to an ARP 2500. The synthesizer did not play any sounds directly as it was monophonic; instead it modified the block chords on the organ as an input signal. The demo, recorded at a half-time tempo compared to the version by the Who, was completed by Townshend overdubbing drums, bass, electric guitar, vocals and handclaps.

== Recording ==
Brief sample from the song "Won't Get Fooled Again"
The closing section of "Won't Get Fooled Again", featuring synthesised organ, Moon's drumming, Townshend's power chord and Daltrey's scream

The Who's first attempt to record the song was at the Record Plant on W 44 Street, New York City, on 16 March 1971. Manager Kit Lambert had recommended the studio to the group, which led to his producer credit, though the de facto work was done by Felix Pappalardi. This take featured Pappalardi's Mountain bandmate, Leslie West, on lead guitar.

Lambert proved to be unable to mix the track, and a fresh attempt at recording was made at the start of April at Mick Jagger's house, Stargroves, using the Rolling Stones Mobile Studio. Glyn Johns was invited to help with production, and he decided to re-use the synthesized organ track from Townshend's original demo, as the re-recording of the part in New York was felt to be inferior to the original. Keith Moon had to carefully synchronise his drum playing with the synthesizer, while Townshend and Entwistle played electric guitar and bass respectively.

Townshend played a 1959 Gretsch 6120 Chet Atkins hollow body guitar fed through an Edwards volume pedal to a Fender Bandmaster amp, all of which he had been given by Joe Walsh while in New York. This combination became his main electric guitar recording setup for subsequent albums. Although intended as a demo recording, the end result sounded so good to the band and Johns, they decided to use it as the final take. Overdubs, including an acoustic guitar part played by Townshend, were recorded at Olympic Studios at the end of April. The track was mixed at Island Studios by Johns on 28 May. After Lifehouse was abandoned as a project, Johns felt "Won't Get Fooled Again", along with other songs, were so good that they could simply be released as a standalone single album, which became Who's Next.

== Release ==
"Won't Get Fooled Again" was first released in the UK as a single A-side on 25 June 1971, edited down to 3:35. It replaced "Behind Blue Eyes", which the group felt did not fit the Who's established musical style, as the choice of single. It was released in July in the US. The B-side, "I Don't Even Know Myself", was recorded at Eel Pie Studios in 1970 for a planned EP that was never released. The single reached No. 9 in the UK charts and No. 15 in the US. Initial publicity material showed an abandoned cover of Who's Next featuring Moon dressed in drag and brandishing a whip.

The full-length version of the song appeared as the closing track of Who's Next, released in August in the US and 27 August in the UK, where it topped the album charts. "Won't Get Fooled Again" drew strong praise from critics, who were impressed that a synthesizer had managed to be integrated so successfully within a rock song. Who author Dave Marsh described singer Roger Daltrey's scream near the end of the track as "the greatest scream of a career filled with screams". Cash Box said of it that the song has "rousing magic with the Who's trademark instrumental and vocal strength" and that "revolutionary lyric matched by the group's performance fervor make this a monster on its way." Record World said that "every element of [the Who's] unmistakable, magnificent sound is in the grooves here." Rock critic Paul Williams in a Rolling Stone issue, published on 17 September 1981, compared the instrumental built-up of the long version to the Doors' "Light My Fire".

In 2012, Paste ranked the song number twelve on their list of the 20 greatest the Who songs, and in 2022, Rolling Stone ranked the song number one on their list of the 50 greatest the Who songs. In 2021, the song was ranked number 295 on Rolling Stone's The 500 Greatest Songs of All Time. As of March 2018 it was certified Silver for 200,000 sold copies in the UK.

== Live performances ==
The Who first performed the song live at the opening date of a series of Lifehouse-related concerts in the Young Vic theatre, London on 14 February 1971. It has subsequently been part of every Who concert since, often as the set closer and sometimes extended slightly to allow Townshend to smash his guitar or Moon to kick over his drumkit. The group performed live over the synthesizer part being played on a backing tape, which required Moon to wear headphones to hear a click track, allowing him to play in sync. It was the last track Moon played live in front of a paying audience on 21 October 1976 and the last song he ever played with the Who at Shepperton Studios on 25 May 1978, less than four months before his death, which was captured on the documentary film The Kids Are Alright. The song was part of the Who's set at Live Aid in 1985 and Live 8 in 2005.

In October 2001, the Who performed the song at The Concert for New York City to help raise funds for the families of firemen and police officers killed during the 9/11 attacks. They finished their set with "Won't Get Fooled Again" to a responsive and emotional audience, with close-up aerial video footage of the World Trade Center buildings playing behind them on a huge digital screen. In February 2010, the group closed their set during the halftime show of Super Bowl XLIV with this song. While the Who have continued to play the song live, Townshend has expressed mixed feelings for it, alternating between pride and embarrassment in interviews. Who biographer John Atkins described the track as "the quintessential Who's Next track but not necessarily the best."

Several live and alternative versions of the song have been released on CD or DVD. In 2003, a deluxe version of Who's Next was reissued to include the Record Plant recording of the track from March 1971 and a live version recorded at the Young Vic on 26 April 1971. The song is also included on the album Live at the Royal Albert Hall, from a 2000 show with Noel Gallagher guesting.

Daltrey, Entwistle and Townshend have each performed the song at solo concerts. Townshend has re-arranged the song for solo performance on acoustic guitar. On 30 June 1979, he performed a duet of the song with classical guitarist John Williams for the 1979 Amnesty International benefit The Secret Policeman's Ball.

In May 2019, Daltrey and Townshend performed a version of the song on classroom instruments with Jimmy Fallon and his house band the Roots for the Tonight Show.

== Chart history ==
=== Weekly charts ===
Chart (1971)	Peak position
Australia (Kent Music Report)	14
Belgium (Ultratop 50 Wallonia)	37
Canada Top Singles (RPM)	7
Germany (GfK)	27
Ireland (IRMA)	14
Netherlands (Dutch Top 40)	11
Netherlands (Single Top 100)	8
UK Singles (OCC)	9
US Billboard Hot 100	15
US Cash Box Top 100	9
Chart (2006)	Peak position
UK Singles (OCC)	144

=== Year-end charts ===
Chart (1971)	Rank
US Billboard Hot 100	84
US Cash Box	40

== Certifications ==
Region	Certification	Certified units/sales
United Kingdom (BPI)	Gold	400,000^{‡}
^{‡} Sales+streaming figures based on certification alone.

== Personnel ==
- Roger Daltrey – lead vocals
- Pete Townshend – electric guitar, acoustic guitar, EMS VCS 3, Lowrey organ, vocals
- John Entwistle – bass guitar
- Keith Moon – drums, percussion

== Cover versions ==
The song was first covered in a distinctive soul style by Labelle on their 1972 album Moon Shadow. Van Halen covered the song in concert in 1992. Eddie Van Halen re-arranged the track so that the synthesizer part was played on the guitar. A live recording was released on Live: Right Here, Right Now, and made it to number one on the Billboard Album Rock Tracks chart.

Both Axel Rudi Pell (on Diamonds Unlocked) and Hayseed Dixie (on Killer Grass) covered the song in their established styles of metal and bluegrass respectively. Richie Havens covered the track on his 2008 album, Nobody Left to Crown, playing the song at a slower tempo than the original.
