= Behind Blue Eyes =

1971 single by the Who

- Belgian sleeve single

Single by the Who

from the album Who's Next
- B-side: "Going Mobile" (Europe); "My Wife" (US)
- Released: October 1971
- Recorded: May–June 1971
- Studio: Olympic, London
- Genre: Art rock; folk rock
- Length: 3:41 (album version); 3:28 (original version)
- Label: Polydor (Europe); Decca (US)
- Songwriter: Pete Townshend
- Producers: The Who; Glyn Johns; Kit Lambert; Chris Stamp; Pete Kameron

The Who singles chronology
| "Baba O'Riley" (1971) | "Behind Blue Eyes" (1971) | "Join Together" (1972) |

"Behind Blue Eyes" is a song by the English rock band the Who. It was released as the second single from the band's fifth studio album, Who's Next (1971), and was originally written by Pete Townshend for his Lifehouse project. The single entered the US Billboard Hot 100 chart on 6 November 1971, reaching number 34. The song is one of the Who's best-known recordings and has been covered by many artists.

== Background ==
"Behind Blue Eyes" originated after a Tommy Tour concert in Denver, on 9 June 1970. Following the performance, Townshend became tempted by a female groupie, but he instead went back to his room alone, possibly as a result of the teachings of his spiritual leader, Meher Baba. Upon reaching his room, he began writing a prayer, the first words being "When my fist clenches, crack it open ..." These words later appeared as lyrics in the "climactic rocking section" of "Behind Blue Eyes".

When "Behind Blue Eyes" was to be released as part of the aborted Lifehouse project, the song was sung from the point of view of the main villain, Jumbo. The lyrics are a first-person lament from Jumbo, who is always angry and full of angst because of all the pressure and temptation that surrounds him, and the song was intended to be his "theme song" had the project been successful. Pete Townshend said of the song's lyrics:

"Behind Blue Eyes" really is off the wall because that was a song sung by the villain of the piece [Jumbo], the fact that he felt in the original story that he was forced into a position of being a villain whereas he felt he was a good guy.

== Composition ==
"Behind Blue Eyes" is an art rock and folk rock ballad, with a moderate tempo of 116 beats per minute. It starts with a solo voice singing over an arpeggiated acoustic guitar in the key of E minor. Then, a bass guitar and ethereal harmonies are added before the song breaks out into a full-scale rock anthem. A second theme is introduced near the end, followed by a brief reprise of the quieter first theme.

Songs written in alternating sections were a feature of Townshend's writing of the period, going back at least to Tommy, where the technique was used in "Christmas" and "Go to the Mirror!" The guitar riff at the end of the anthemic rock section is also used after the bridge during the song "Won't Get Fooled Again", perhaps serving as a link between the two songs when both were intended to be parts of a single rock opera.

== Release ==
The version of "Behind Blue Eyes" released on Who's Next in 1971 was the second version the band recorded; the first was recorded at the Record Plant in New York on 18 March 1971 and features Al Kooper on Hammond organ. The original version was released as a bonus track on the 1995 CD reissue of the album.

"Behind Blue Eyes" was initially considered for a UK single release, but Townshend claimed that the song was "too much out of character" for the British singles market. However, the song did eventually see a single release in France, Belgium, the United States and the Netherlands. Backed with "My Wife" in the US and "Going Mobile" in Europe, the song reached number 34 on the Billboard Hot 100 and number 24 on Cashbox, with the latter calling it "another Townshend masterpiece in traditional Who fashion."

== Critical reception ==
Record World said that the band "slows the pace considerably until its break. Then the guys get down to some smashing, crashing British rock & roll."

== Personnel ==
- Roger Daltrey – lead vocals
- Pete Townshend – acoustic and electric guitar, backing vocals
- John Entwistle – bass, backing vocals
- Keith Moon – drums

== Charts ==
| Chart (1971–1972) | Peak position |
|---|---|
| Canada Top Singles (RPM) | 23 |
| Netherlands (Dutch Top 40) | 34 |
| US Billboard Hot 100 | 34 |
| US Cash Box | 24 |

| Chart (2012) | Peak position |
|---|---|
| France (SNEP) | 147 |

== Certifications ==
| Region | Certification | Certified units/sales |
|---|---|---|
| United Kingdom (BPI) | Silver | 200,000^{‡} |
^{‡} Sales+streaming figures based on certification alone.

== In other media ==
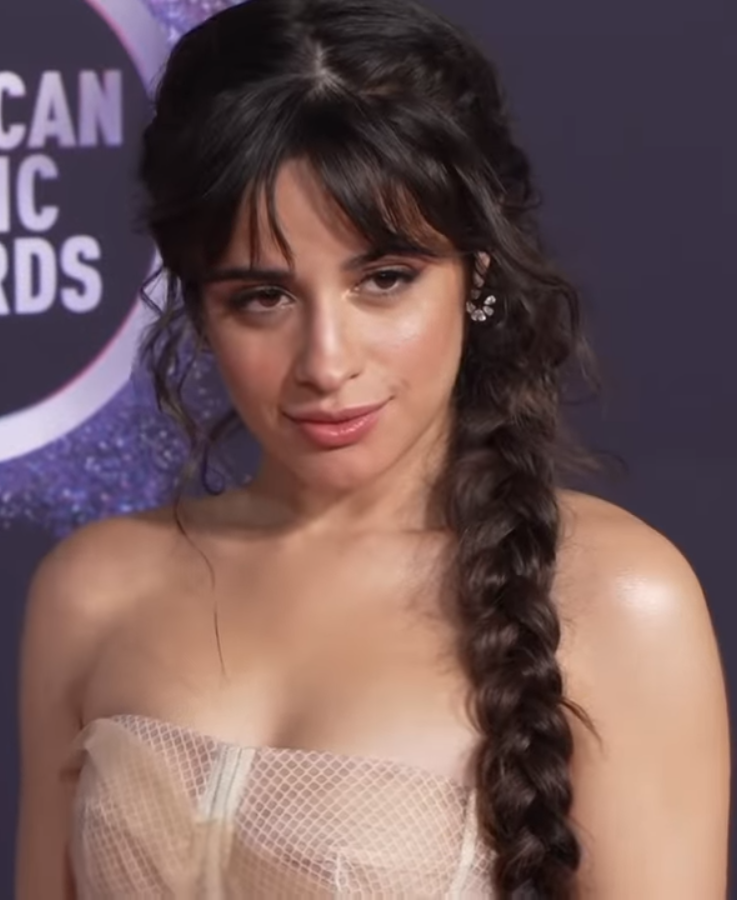
Camila Cabello covered "Behind Blue Eyes" for Diablo IV: Vessel of Hatred's live action trailer

- Pete Townshend has recorded two solo versions of the song:
  - The original demo of the song was featured on the compilation album Scoop (1983).
  - The demo along with a newer recording of the song featuring an orchestral backing was included in the box set The Lifehouse Chronicles (2000).
- In the WB television series Buffy the Vampire Slayer, the episode "Where the Wild Things Are" (2000) features the character Rupert Giles (Anthony Stewart Head) singing a cover of the song.
- A cover of the song was used in the second season finale of the FX television series Legion. The show's creator, Noah Hawley, sings the track with Jeff Russo on backing vocals as well as any instruments used in the song. However, in the context of the show, Dan Stevens and Navid Negahban sing the song in English and Persian.
- In Diablo IV: Vessel of Hatred's live action trailer, pop singer Camila Cabello covers "Behind Blue Eyes", exclusively premiered by Rolling Stone.

== Limp Bizkit version ==
"Behind Blue Eyes"

Single by Limp Bizkit

from the album Results May Vary
- B-side: "Just Drop Dead"
- Released: 23 September 2003
- Genre: Alternative rock
- Length: 4:28 (without hidden track); 5:58 (album version with hidden track)
- Label: Flip; Interscope
- Songwriter: Pete Townshend
- Producer: Fred Durst

Limp Bizkit singles chronology
| "Eat You Alive" (2003) | "Behind Blue Eyes" (2003) | "Home Sweet Home/Bittersweet Symphony" (2005) |

Music video
- "Behind Blue Eyes" (Gothika version) on YouTube

"Behind Blue Eyes" was covered by American nu metal band Limp Bizkit. It was released in 2003 as a single from their album Results May Vary. Limp Bizkit's arrangement is notable for featuring a Speak & Spell during the bridge. This, together with a new verse and an extra chorus, replaces the rock theme of the Who's version. The song is followed by a hidden track titled "All That Easy", after a few seconds of silence, making the total length 5:58. However, the hidden track is not featured in the single release.

Although the cover received mainly negative reviews, it reached number 71 on the US Billboard Hot 100 and was successful worldwide. It reached number one in the Czech Republic and Sweden and charted within the top three in Austria, Denmark, Germany, and Norway. Elsewhere in Europe, it became a top 20 hit in Belgium, France, the Netherlands, and Switzerland, while peaking at number 18 on the UK Singles Chart. In Australasia, it reached number four in Australia and number five in New Zealand.

=== Critical reception ===
"Behind Blue Eyes" was panned by Rolling Stone magazine readers, who named it the second-worst cover song of all time. Conversely, Sun-Sentinel praised the cover, stating that it proves "Durst can do more than just rap." Eberhard Dobler of Laut.de similarly noted that Durst's singing had come a long way from in their George Michael cover, "Faith", while the song itself continues the band's shift to melodic alternative rock, started in the previous single, "Eat You Alive".

=== Music videos ===
Two music videos were released for Limp Bizkit's version of "Behind Blue Eyes". The first (available on the band's YouTube channel), depicts the song dubbed over various footage of the band on tour intercut with frontman Fred Durst performing the song. The other features Academy Award-winning actress Halle Berry. Loosely based on the motion picture Gothika, in which Berry stars, this video also contains a shot directly showing the movie's title. It depicts Berry and Durst in a relationship similar to the storyline of the film. The song also appeared during the credits of the film itself and this video was included as a bonus feature on its DVD.

=== Track listings ===
UK CD single

1. "Behind Blue Eyes" (album version)
2. "Just Drop Dead"
3. "Rollin'" (DJ Monk vs. the Track Mack remix)
4. "Behind Blue Eyes" (video)

European 7-inch single and German mini-CD single

1. "Behind Blue Eyes" (album version) – 4:30
2. "Just Drop Dead" – 4:02

Australasian CD single

1. "Behind Blue Eyes" (album version)
2. "Just Drop Dead"
3. "My Way" (remixed by DJ Lethal)
4. "Behind Blue Eyes" (video)

=== Charts ===
==== Weekly charts ====
| Chart (2003–2004) | Peak position |
|---|---|
| Australia (ARIA) | 4 |
| Austria (Ö3 Austria Top 40) | 3 |
| Belgium (Ultratop 50 Flanders) | 13 |
| Belgium (Ultratop 50 Wallonia) | 16 |
| Czech Republic (IFPI) | 1 |
| Denmark (Tracklisten) | 2 |
| Europe (Eurochart Hot 100) | 5 |
| France (SNEP) | 17 |
| Germany (GfK) | 2 |
| Hungary (Rádiós Top 40) | 12 |
| Ireland (IRMA) | 26 |
| Italy (FIMI) | 28 |
| Netherlands (Dutch Top 40) | 4 |
| Netherlands (Single Top 100) | 5 |
| New Zealand (Recorded Music NZ) | 5 |
| Norway (VG-lista) | 2 |
| Poland (Polish Airplay Charts) | 11 |
| Romania (Romanian Top 100) | 9 |
| Scottish Singles Sales (Official Charts) | 16 |
| Sweden (Sverigetopplistan) | 1 |
| Switzerland (Schweizer Hitparade) | 5 |
| UK Singles (Official Charts) | 18 |
| UK Rock & Metal (Official Charts) | 2 |
| US Billboard Hot 100 | 71 |
| US Alternative Airplay (Billboard) | 18 |
| US Mainstream Rock (Billboard) | 11 |
| US Pop Airplay (Billboard) | 25 |

| Chart (2025) | Peak position |
|---|---|
| Moldova Airplay (TopHit) | 97 |

==== Year-end charts ====
| Chart (2004) | Position |
|---|---|
| Australia (ARIA) | 12 |
| Austria (Ö3 Austria Top 40) | 8 |
| Belgium (Ultratop 50 Flanders) | 64 |
| Belgium (Ultratop 50 Wallonia) | 66 |
| Brazil (Crowley) | 16 |
| Germany (Media Control GfK) | 15 |
| Hungary (Rádiós Top 40) | 20 |
| Netherlands (Dutch Top 40) | 76 |
| Netherlands (Single Top 100) | 77 |
| New Zealand (RIANZ) | 35 |
| Sweden (Hitlistan) | 29 |
| Switzerland (Schweizer Hitparade) | 14 |
| US Mainstream Rock Tracks (Billboard) | 39 |
| US Modern Rock Tracks (Billboard) | 52 |

==== Decade-end charts ====
| Chart (2000–2009) | Position |
|---|---|
| Australia (ARIA) | 91 |

=== Certifications ===
| Region | Certification | Certified units/sales |
|---|---|---|
| Australia (ARIA) | Platinum | 70,000^{^} |
| Denmark (IFPI Danmark) | Gold | 45,000^{‡} |
| Germany (BVMI) | 2× Platinum | 600,000^{‡} |
| New Zealand (RMNZ) | 2× Platinum | 60,000^{‡} |
| Norway (IFPI Norway) | Gold | 5,000^{*} |
| Switzerland (IFPI Switzerland) | Gold | 20,000^{^} |
| United Kingdom (BPI) | Platinum | 600,000^{‡} |
| United States (RIAA) | Gold | 500,000^{^} |
^{*} Sales figures based on certification alone.^{^} Shipments figures based on certification alone.^{‡} Sales+streaming figures based on certification alone.

=== Release history ===
| Region | Date | Format(s) | Label(s) | Ref. |
|---|---|---|---|---|
| United States | 23 September 2003 | Digital download | Flip; Interscope | |
| United States | 3 November 2003 | Contemporary hit radio | Flip; Interscope | |
| United Kingdom | 24 November 2003 | CD | Flip; Interscope | |
| Australia | 1 December 2003 | CD | Flip; Interscope | |
