= List of the Who band members =

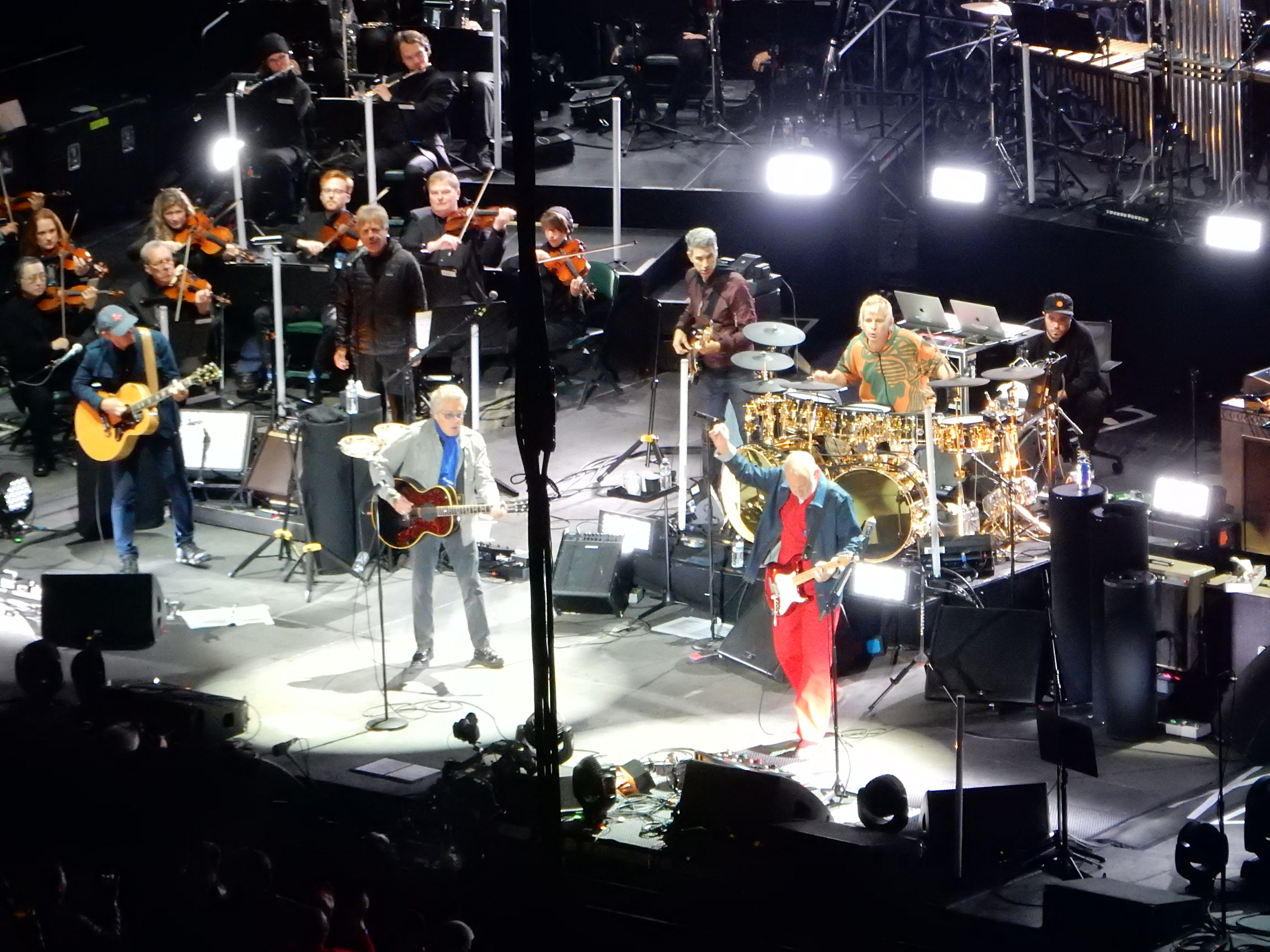
The Who performing with orchestra at the T-Mobile Park in 2019. (from left to right) Simon Townshend, Billy Nichols, Roger Daltrey, Jon Button, Pete Townshend, Zak Starkey and Loren Gold.

The Who are an English rock band. Founded in 1961 under the name the Detours, they changed their name to the Who in 1964. Their classic line-up was Roger Daltrey (vocals), Pete Townshend (guitar), John Entwistle (bass) and Keith Moon (drums). Moon and Entwistle died in 1978 and 2002 respectively, with Daltrey and Townshend being the only constant members throughout the band's history.

== History ==
The band were first founded by Roger Daltrey under the name the Detours in 1961. The first line-up included Daltrey on guitar, John Entwistle on bass, Colin Dawson on vocals and Harry Wilson on drums. In 1962, Pete Townshend joined on lead guitar at Entwistle's suggestion. Wilson was fired in mid-1962 and replaced by Doug Sandom.

Dawson left after frequently arguing with Daltrey and was briefly replaced by Gabby Connolly, before Daltrey moved to lead vocals. Townshend, with Entwistle's encouragement, became the sole guitarist. Sandom was fired after an argument with Townshend in 1964; the band continued with stand-in drummers until Keith Moon joined in April of that year.

Moon was the Who's drummer until his death on 7 September 1978; the band decided to continue without him. He was replaced that November by Kenney Jones, who had previously played with the Small Faces and Faces. Joining alongside Jones were keyboardist John "Rabbit" Bundrick and a four-piece horn section consisting of Dick Parry and Howie Casey (saxophone), David Caswell (trumpet), and Reg Brooks (trombone). The horn section departed in 1980, and Bundrick left in 1981. The latter was replaced by Tim Gorman for the band's final tour in 1982. The Who broke up in 1983.

The Who reunited at Live Aid in 1985, with Jones and Bundrick reprising their roles. The band reunited again in 1988, which the same personnel. In 1989, the band embarked on a 25th-anniversary The Kids Are Alright reunion tour with Simon Phillips on drums, Steve "Boltz" Bolton on second guitarist, Jody Linscott on percussion, Simon Clarke and Tim Sanders on saxophone, Roddy Lorimer and Simon Gardner on trumpet, Neil Sidwell on trombone, and Chyna Gordon, Cleveland Watkiss and Billy Nicholls on backing vocals.

The band reformed again at their Rock and Roll Hall of Fame induction with Paul Shaffer and the World's Most Dangerous Band as backup band.

The band would tour again in 1996, with an expanded band, consisting of John "Rabbit" Bundrick on keyboards, Zak Starkey on drums, Simon Townshend on second guitar, Jon Carin on keyboards, Jody Linscott on percussion, Dennis Farias, Nick Lane and Roy Wiegand on horns, Simon Gardner on trumpet, Neil Sidwell on trombone, and Billy Nicholls on backing vocals and as musical director.

In late 1999, the Who performed as a five-piece for the first time since 1985, with Bundrick on keyboards and Starkey on drums. The band toured the US and UK from June to October 2000, with Simon Townshend returning as second guitarist. The Who played concerts in the UK in early 2002 in preparation for a full US tour. On 27 June, the day before the first date, Entwistle, 57, was found dead of a heart attack at the Hard Rock Hotel in Las Vegas. Cocaine was a contributing factor.

Entwistle's son, Christopher, gave a statement supporting the Who's decision to carry on. The US tour began at the Hollywood Bowl with touring bassist Pino Palladino. Bundrick took a hiatus from the band to tend to his terminally ill wife between November 2006 and March 2007, and was substituted for by his keyboard tech Brian Kehew.

The band played at the 2012 Summer Olympics closing ceremony, with Chris Stainton on keyboards and Morgan Nicholls on bass. The Quadrophenia and More tour started in November 2012 in Ottawa with keyboardists John Corey, Loren Gold and Frank Simes, the last of whom was also musical director, second guitarist Simon Townshend, and J. Greg Miller and Reggie Grisham on brass. Miller and Grisham both departed in 2013. Palladino departed in 2015, followed by Corey and Simes in 2017. Jon Button took over bass while the band continued with Gold as their sole keyboardist.

The band started touring with an orchestra in 2019. Billy Nichols returned as musical director and backing vocalist, Keith Levenson joined as conductor, Katie Jacoby on lead violin, Audrey Q. Snyder on lead cello, and Emily Marshall on second keyboards. Randy Landau joined as lead contrabassist in 2022. The band ceased performing with an orchestra in 2025 (though retaining Jacoby on violin), and were joined by backing vocalist John Hogg (replacing Nicholls) and returning percussionist Jody Linscott.

On 16 April 2025, the band announced they would be parting ways with longtime touring drummer Zak Starkey, before reversing their decision on 19 April. On May 18, Pete Townshend announced on Instagram that Zak Starkey would be leaving to pursue other projects and Scott Devours from Roger Daltrey's solo touring band would replace him for the Who's final shows. Shortly after, Starkey posted his own statement in which he said that he had been fired two weeks after reinstatement and been asked by the band to state that he had quit.

== Members ==
=== Current members ===
Image	Name	Years active	Instruments	Release contributions
	Roger Daltrey	1961–1983; 1985; 1988; 1989; 1996–present	lead and backing vocals; harmonica; rhythm guitar (except for 1963–1981); percussion	all releases
	Pete Townshend	1962–1983; 1985; 1988; 1989; 1996–present	guitar; lead and backing vocals; keyboards; synthesizers	all releases

=== Former members ===
Image	Name	Years active	Instruments	Release contributions
	John Entwistle	1961–1983; 1985; 1988; 1989; 1996–2002 (died 2002)	bass; backing and lead vocals; brass; piano; synthesizers	all releases from My Generation (1965) to Live at the Royal Albert Hall (2003)
	Colin Dawson	1961–1963	lead vocals	none
	Harry Wilson	1961–1962	drums	none
	Doug Sandom	1962–1964 (died 2019)	drums	none
	Gabby Connolly	1963	lead vocals	none
	Keith Moon	1964–1978 (died 1978)	drums; percussion; occasional vocals	all releases from My Generation (1965) to Quadrophenia soundtrack (1979)
	Kenney Jones	1978–1983; 1985; 1988 (one off 2014)	drums	all releases from Quadrophenia soundtrack (1979) to Who's Last (1984)

== Touring members ==
=== Current touring members ===
Image	Name	Years active	Instruments	Release contributions
	Jody Linscott	1989; 1996–1997; 2025–present	percussion	Thirty Years of Maximum R&B (1994); Join Together (1990)
	Simon Townshend	1996–1997; 2002–present	guitar; vocals; mandolin; occasional keyboards	all current releases from Live At The Royal Albert Hall (2001) to present
	Loren Gold	2012–present	keyboards; backing vocals	all current releases from 12-12-12 The Concert for Sandy Relief (2013) to present except Who (2019)
	Jon Button	2017–present	bass guitar; backing vocals	Tommy - Live At The Royal Albert Hall (2017)
	Katie Jacoby	2019–present	violin	none to date
	Scott Devours	2025–present (substitute 2013)	drums	none to date
	John Hogg	2025–present	backing vocals; percussion	none to date

=== Former touring members ===
Image	Name	Years active	Instruments	Release contributions
	John "Rabbit" Bundrick	1979–1981; 1985; 1988; 1989; 1996–2011	keyboards; backing vocals	Join Together (1990); Thirty Years of Maximum R&B (1994); Live at the Royal Albert Hall (2001/2003); Live in Boston (2004); Tommy and Quadrophenia Live with Special Guests (2005); Live at the Isle of Wight Festival 2004 (2017)
	Howie Casey	1979–1980	saxophone	none
	Dick Parry	1979–1980 (died 2026)	saxophone	none
	David Caswell	1979–1980	trumpet	none
	Reg Brooks	1979–1980	trombone	none
	Tim Gorman	1982 (died 2025)	keyboards; backing vocals	It's Hard (1982); Who's Last (1984); Thirty Years of Maximum R&B (1994)
	Billy Nicholls	1989; 1996–1997; 2019–2025	backing vocals	Who Are You (1978); Join Together (1990); Tommy and Quadrophenia Live (2005); Music for the Closing Ceremony of the London 2012 Olympic Games (2012)
	Simon Gardner	1989; 1996–1997	trumpet	Join Together (1990)
	Neil Sidwell	1989; 1996–1997	trombone	Join Together (1990)
	Simon Philips	1989	drums	Join Together (1990); Thirty Years of Maximum R&B (1994)
	Steve Bolton	1989	rhythm and lead guitar	Join Together (1990); Thirty Years of Maximum R&B (1994)
	Chyna Gordon	1989	backing vocals	Join Together (1990)
	Cleveland Watkiss	1989	backing vocals	Join Together (1990)
	Simon Clarke	1989	saxophone	Join Together (1990)
	Tim Sanders	1989	saxophone	Join Together (1990)
	Roddy Lorimer	1989	trumpet	Join Together (1990)
	Zak Starkey	1996–2025	drums; percussion	all releases from Live at the Royal Albert Hall (2001) to The Who with Orchestra Live at Wembley (2023)
	Jon Carin	1996–1997; 2001 (substitute)	keyboards	The Concert for New York City (2001); Tommy and Quadrophenia Live (2005)
	Dennis Farias	1996–1997	trumpet	none
	Roy Wiegand	1996–1997	trumpet	none
	Nick Lane	1996–1997	trombone	none
	Pino Palladino	2002–2016	bass	all releases from Live in Boston (2004) to Live at the Isle of Wight Festival 2004 (2017); Who (2019)
	Frank Simes	2012–2017	keyboards; backing vocals; musical director	12-12-12: The Concert for Sandy Relief (2013); Quadrophenia Live in London (2014); Live in Hyde Park (2015); Tommy - Live at the Royal Albert Hall (2017)
	John Corey	2012–2017	keyboards; backing vocals	12-12-12: The Concert for Sandy Relief (2013); Quadrophenia Live in London (2014); Live in Hyde Park (2015); Tommy - Live at the Royal Albert Hall (2017)
	J. Greg Miller	2012–2013	brass	12-12-12: The Concert for Sandy Relief (2013); Quadrophenia Live in London (2014)
	Reggie Grisham	2012–2013	brass	12-12-12: The Concert for Sandy Relief (2013); Quadrophenia Live in London (2014)
	Keith Levenson	2019–2024	music coordinator; conductor	none
	Audrey Q. Snyder	2019–2024	cello	none
	Emily Marshall	2019–2024	keyboards; associate conductor	none
	Randy Landau	2022–2024	contrabass	none

=== Substitutes ===
Image	Name	Years active	Instruments	Notes
	Dave Golding	1964	drums	Session drummer Golding played with the Who following the departure of Sandom before the arrival of Moon.
	Scot Halpin	1973 (died 2008)	drums	Moon lost consciousness during a show in San Francisco on 20 November 1973, and was substituted for by audience member Halpin.
	Peter Huntington	2004–2006	drums	Due to Starkey's touring commitments with Oasis, Huntington was the main drummer on Endless Wire.
	Steve White	2005	drums	Starkey and Palladino were not able to join the band at Live8 in 2005, and were substituted for by White and Minchella.
	Damon Minchella	2005	bass	Starkey and Palladino were not able to join the band at Live8 in 2005, and were substituted for by White and Minchella.
	Brian Kehew	2006–2007	keyboards	Bundrick was tending to his terminally ill wife between November 2006 and March 2007 and was substituted for by his keyboard tech Kehew.
	J.J. Blair	2006	keyboards	Kehew was unable to join the band on 8 November 2006, and was substituted for by Blair.
	Chris Stainton	2012	keyboards	Nicholls and Stainton performed with the band at the 2012 Summer Olympics closing ceremony.
	Morgan Nicholls	2012	bass	Nicholls and Stainton performed with the band at the 2012 Summer Olympics closing ceremony.

== Session musicians ==
Image	Name	Years active	Instruments	Release contributions
	Jimmy Page	1965	lead guitar; twelve string guitar	"I Can't Explain" (1965); My Generation (1965)
	The Ivy League	1965	backing vocals	"I Can't Explain" (1965); My Generation (1965)
	Perry Ford	1965 (died 1999)	piano	"I Can't Explain" (1965); My Generation (1965)
	Nicky Hopkins	1965; 1971; 1974; (died 1994)	piano	My Generation (1965); Who's Next (1971); Tommy (soundtrack) (1975); The Who by Numbers (1975)
	Speedy Keen	1967 (died 2002)	vocals	The Who Sell Out (1967)
	Al Kooper	1967; 1971	organ	The Who Sell Out (1967); Who's Next (1971)
	Dave Arbus	1971 (died 2025)	violin	Who's Next (1971)
	Leslie West	1971 (died 2020)	lead guitar	Who's Next (1971)
	Jon Curle	1972–1973	voice	Quadrophenia (1973)
	Chris Stainton	1972–1974	piano; organ; acoustic guitar	Quadrophenia (1973); Tommy (soundtrack) (1975)
	Arthur Brown	1974	vocals	Tommy (soundtrack) (1975)
	Tina Turner	1974 (died 2023)	vocals	Tommy (soundtrack) (1975)
	Eric Clapton	1974	vocals; guitar	Tommy (soundtrack) (1975)
	Elton John	1974	vocals; piano	Tommy (soundtrack) (1975)
	Mick Ralphs	1974 (died 2025)	guitar	Tommy (soundtrack) (1975)
	Caleb Quaye	1974	guitar	Tommy (soundtrack) (1975)
	Ronnie Wood	1974	guitar	Tommy (soundtrack) (1975)
	Davey Johnstone	1974	guitar	Tommy (soundtrack) (1975)
	Alan Ross	1974	acoustic guitar	Tommy (soundtrack) (1975)
	Gerald Shaw	1974	organ	Tommy (soundtrack) (1975)
	Phil Chen	1974 (died 2021)	bass	Tommy (soundtrack) (1975)
	Dave Wintour	1974 (died 2022)	bass	Tommy (soundtrack) (1975)
	Tony Stevens	1974	bass	Tommy (soundtrack) (1975)
	Dee Murray	1974 (died 1992)	bass	Tommy (soundtrack) (1975)
	Fuzzy Samuels	1974	bass	Tommy (soundtrack) (1975)
	Mike Kellie	1974 (died 2017)	drums	Tommy (soundtrack) (1975)
	Tony Newman	1974	drums	Tommy (soundtrack) (1975)
	Graham Deakin	1974	drums	Tommy (soundtrack) (1975)
	Nigel Olsson	1974	drums	Tommy (soundtrack) (1975)
	Ray Cooper	1974	percussion	Tommy (soundtrack) (1975)
	Rod Argent	1977–1978	synthesizer; piano; keyboards	Who Are You (1978)
	Ted Astley	1977–1978 (died 1998)	string arrangements	Who Are You (1978)
	Andy Fairweather-Low	1977–1978; 1982	backing vocals; rhythm guitar	Who Are You (1978); It's Hard (1982)
	Greg Lake	2003–2004 (died 2016)	bass guitar	"Real Good Looking Boy" (2004)
	Jolyon Dixon	2004–2006	acoustic guitar	Endless Wire (2006)
	Lawrence Ball	2004–2006	electronics	Endless Wire (2006)
	Stuart Ross	2004–2006	bass	Endless Wire (2006)
	Peter Huntington	2004–2006	drums	Endless Wire (2006)
	Gill Morley	2004–2006	violin	Endless Wire (2006)
	Brian Right	2004–2006	violin	Endless Wire (2006)
	Ellen Blair	2004–2006	viola	Endless Wire (2006)
	Vicky Matthews	2004–2006	cello	Endless Wire (2006)
	Rachel Fuller	2004–2006; 2019	keyboards; orchestrations	Endless Wire (2006); Who (2019)
	Mick Talbot	2014	keyboards	"Be Lucky" (2014)
	Andrew Synowiec	2019	acoustic guitar	Who (2019)
	Gordon Giltrap	2019	acoustic guitar	Who (2019)
	Benmont Tench	2019	organ; mellotron	Who (2019)
	Dave Sardy	2019	mellotron; synthesizer programming	Who (2019)
	Martin Batchelar	2019	programming; orchestration; arrangements; conducting	Who (2019)
	Peter Rotter	2019	orchestra fixer	Who (2019)
	Bruce Dukov	2019	orchestra leader	Who (2019)
	Gus Seyffert	2019	bass	Who (2019)
	Joey Waronker	2019	drums	Who (2019)
	Carla Azar	2019	drums	Who (2019)
	Matt Chamberlain	2019	drums	Who (2019)
	Josh Tyrrell	2019	handclaps	Who (2019)
	Rowan McIntosh	2019	handclaps	Who (2019)

== Line-ups ==
Period	Members	Releases
1961–1962: The Detours	Colin Dawson – lead vocals; Roger Daltrey – guitar, backing vocals; John Entwistle – bass, backing vocals; Harry Wilson – drums	none
1962: The Detours	Colin Dawson – lead vocals; Pete Townshend – lead guitar; Roger Daltrey – rhythm guitar, backing vocals; John Entwistle – bass, backing vocals; Doug Sandom – drums	none
1963: The Detours	Gabby Connolly – lead vocals; Pete Townshend – lead guitar; Roger Daltrey – rhythm guitar, backing vocals; John Entwistle – bass, backing vocals; Doug Sandom – drums	none
January – February 1964: The Detours; February 1964: The Who	Roger Daltrey – lead vocals, harmonica; Pete Townshend – guitar, backing vocals; John Entwistle – bass, backing vocals; Doug Sandom – drums	none
February – April 1964: The Who	Roger Daltrey – lead vocals, harmonica; Pete Townshend – guitar, backing vocals; John Entwistle – bass, backing vocals; Dave Golding – drums (unofficial contract player)	none
April – July 1964: The Who; July – November 1964: The High Numbers; November 1964 – 7 September 1978: The Who	Roger Daltrey – lead and backing vocals, harmonica; Pete Townshend – guitar, keyboards, lead and backing vocals; John Entwistle – bass, backing and lead vocals; Keith Moon – drums, occasional vocals (Note: Keith Moon lost consciousness during a show in San Francisco on 20 November 1973, and was substituted for by audience member Scot Halpin.)	all releases from "I'm the Face" (1964) to Quadrophenia (soundtrack) (1979); Thirty Years of Maximum R&B (1994); Live at the Isle of Wight Festival 1970 (1996); BBC Sessions (2000); View from a Backstage Pass (2007); Greatest Hits Live (2010); Live at Hull 1970 (2012); Live at the Fillmore East 1968 (2018)
Keith Moon died 7 September 1978
1979 – 1980: The Who	Roger Daltrey – lead and backing vocals, harmonica; Pete Townshend – guitar, lead and backing vocals; John Entwistle – bass, backing and lead vocals; Kenney Jones – drums; with: John "Rabbit" Bundrick – keyboards; Reg Brooks – trombone; David Caswell – trumpet; Howie Casey – saxophone; Dick Parry – saxophone	Quadrophenia (soundtrack) (1979)
1981: The Who	Roger Daltrey – lead and backing vocals, harmonica; Pete Townshend – guitar, lead and backing vocals; John Entwistle – bass, backing and lead vocals; Kenney Jones – drums; with: John "Rabbit" Bundrick – keyboards	Face Dances (1981); Thirty Years of Maximum R&B (1994)
1982: The Who	Roger Daltrey – lead and backing vocals, rhythm guitar, harmonica; Pete Townshend – lead guitar, lead and backing vocals; John Entwistle – bass, backing and lead vocals; Kenney Jones – drums; with: Tim Gorman – keyboards	It's Hard (1982); Who's Last (1984); Thirty Years of Maximum R&B (1994); Live from Toronto (2006)
Band split 1983–1988
One-off performances at Live Aid in 1985 and the BPI Awards Ceremony in 1988	Roger Daltrey – lead vocals, harmonica; Pete Townshend – guitar, backing vocals; John Entwistle – bass; Kenney Jones – drums; with: John "Rabbit" Bundrick – keyboards	none
1989: The Who 25th Anniversary Tour	Roger Daltrey – lead and backing vocals, rhythm guitar, harmonica; Pete Townshend – lead and rhythm guitar, backing and lead vocals; John Entwistle – bass, occasional vocals; with: John "Rabbit" Bundrick – keyboards; Simon Phillips – drums; Steve "Boltz" Bolton – rhythm and lead guitar; Jody Linscott – percussion; Simon Clarke – saxophone; Roddy Lorimer – trumpet; Simon Gardner – trumpet; Neil Sidwell – trombone; Tim Sanders – saxophone; Chyna Gordon – backing vocals; Cleveland Watkiss – backing vocals; Billy Nicholls – backing vocals, musical director	Join Together (1990); Thirty Years of Maximum R&B (1994); Greatest Hits Live (2010)
Band split 1990–1995
One-off performance at the Rock and Roll Hall of Fame Induction Ceremony in 1990	Roger Daltrey – lead vocals; Pete Townshend – guitar, backing vocals; John Entwistle – bass; with: Paul Shaffer – keyboards, musical director; The World's Most Dangerous Band – house band	none
1996 – 1997: The Who Quadrophenia Tour	Roger Daltrey – lead and backing vocals, rhythm guitar, harmonica; Pete Townshend – lead and rhythm guitar, backing and lead vocals; John Entwistle – bass; with: John "Rabbit" Bundrick – keyboards; Zak Starkey – drums; Simon Townshend – rhythm and lead guitar, backing vocals; Jon Carin – keyboards; Jody Linscott – percussion; Dennis Farias – horn section; Nick Lane – horn section; Roy Wiegand – horn section; Simon Gardner – trumpet; Neil Sidwell – trombone; Billy Nicholls – backing vocals, musical director	none
Band split 1998
1999 – 2001: The Who	Roger Daltrey – lead and backing vocals, rhythm guitar, harmonica; Pete Townshend – guitar, backing and lead vocals; John Entwistle – bass, occasional vocals; with: John "Rabbit" Bundrick – keyboards (Note: John Bundrick was not able to join the band at The Concert for New York City in 2001, and was substituted for by Jon Carin.); Zak Starkey – drums	Blues to the Bush (2000); Live at the Royal Albert Hall (2003); Greatest Hits Live (2010)
February – 27 June 2002: The Who	Roger Daltrey – lead and backing vocals, harmonica; Pete Townshend – lead guitar, backing and lead vocals; John Entwistle – bass; with: John "Rabbit" Bundrick – keyboards; Zak Starkey – drums; Simon Townshend – rhythm guitar, backing vocals	none – This line-up rehearsed for the 2002 tour, but did not actually perform in concert, as John Entwistle died shortly before the first show of the tour.
John Entwistle died 27 June 2002
July 2002 – 2011: The Who	Roger Daltrey – lead and backing vocals, rhythm guitar, harmonica; Pete Townshend – lead guitar, backing and lead vocals; with: John "Rabbit" Bundrick – keyboards (Note: John Bundrick was tending to his terminally ill wife between November 2006 and March 2007 and was substituted for by his keyboard tech Brian Kehew.); Zak Starkey – drums (Note: Zak Starkey and Pino Palladino were not able to join the band at Live8 in 2005, and were substituted for by Steve White and Damon Minchella.); Simon Townshend – rhythm guitar, backing vocals; Pino Palladino – bass	Then and Now 1964 – 2004 (2004, two new tracks); Endless Wire (2006); Greatest Hits Live (2010); Live at the Isle of Wight Festival 2004 (2017)
One-off performance at the 2012 Summer Olympics closing ceremony	Roger Daltrey – lead and backing vocals; Pete Townshend – lead guitar, backing vocals; with: Zak Starkey – drums; Simon Townshend – rhythm guitar, backing vocals, keyboards; Billy Nicholls – backing vocals, musical director; Morgan Nicholls – bass; Chris Stainton – piano, keyboards	none
2012 – 2013: The Who	Roger Daltrey – lead and backing vocals, rhythm guitar, harmonica; Pete Townshend – lead guitar, backing and lead vocals; with: Zak Starkey – drums (Note: Zak Starkey was unable to join the band from 5–14 February and from 8 June – 8 July 2013, and was substituted for by Scott Devours.); Simon Townshend – rhythm guitar, backing vocals; Pino Palladino – bass; Frank Simes – keyboards, backing vocals, musical director; Loren Gold – keyboards, backing vocals; John Corey – piano, keyboards, backing vocals; J. Greg Miller – brass; Reggie Grisham – brass	Quadrophenia Live in London (2014)
2014 – 2016: The Who	Roger Daltrey – lead and backing vocals, rhythm guitar, harmonica; Pete Townshend – lead guitar, backing and lead vocals; with: Zak Starkey – drums; Simon Townshend – rhythm guitar, backing vocals; Pino Palladino – bass; Frank Simes – keyboards, backing vocals, musical director; Loren Gold – keyboards, backing vocals; John Corey – piano, keyboards, backing vocals	The Who Hits 50! (2014, one new track); Live in Hyde Park (2015)
2017: The Who	Roger Daltrey – lead and backing vocals, rhythm guitar, harmonica; Pete Townshend – lead guitar, backing and lead vocals; with: Zak Starkey – drums; Simon Townshend – rhythm guitar, backing vocals; Frank Simes – keyboards, backing vocals, musical director; Loren Gold – keyboards, backing vocals; John Corey – keyboards, backing vocals; Jon Button – bass, backing vocals	Tommy Live at the Royal Albert Hall (2017)
2019 – 2021: The Who	Roger Daltrey – lead and backing vocals, rhythm guitar, harmonica; Pete Townshend – lead guitar, backing and lead vocals; with: Zak Starkey – drums; Simon Townshend – rhythm guitar, backing vocals; Loren Gold – keyboards, backing vocals; Jon Button – bass, backing vocals; Billy Nicholls – backing vocals, musical director; Katie Jacoby – lead violin; Audrey Q. Snyder – lead cello; Emily Marshall – keyboards, associate conductor; Keith Levenson – conductor	Who (2019) (with Palladino)
2022 – 2024: The Who	Roger Daltrey – lead and backing vocals, rhythm guitar, harmonica; Pete Townshend – lead guitar, backing and lead vocals; with: Zak Starkey – drums; Simon Townshend – rhythm guitar, backing vocals; Loren Gold – keyboards, backing vocals; Jon Button – bass, backing vocals; Billy Nicholls – backing vocals, musical director; Randy Landau – contrabass; Katie Jacoby – lead violin; Audrey Q. Snyder – lead cello; Emily Marshall – keyboards, associate conductor; Keith Levenson – conductor	none
2025: The Who	Roger Daltrey – lead and backing vocals, rhythm guitar, harmonica; Pete Townshend – lead guitar, backing and lead vocals; with: Simon Townshend – rhythm guitar, backing vocals; Loren Gold – keyboards, backing vocals; Jon Button – bass, backing vocals; John Hogg – backing vocals, percussion; Katie Jacoby – violin; Scott Devours – drums; Jody Linscott – percussion	none to date
