= Quadrophenia Live in London =

Live album by the Who
- Released: 9 June 2014
- Recorded: 8 July 2013
- Venue: Wembley Arena (London)
- Genre: Rock
- Length: 127:22
- Label: Universal Music
- Producer: Pete Townshend

The Who chronology
Live at Hull 1970 (2012)	Quadrophenia Live in London (2014)	The Who Hits 50! (2014)

Quadrophenia Live in London is a live album by the English rock band the Who. It documents their 8 July 2013 concert at London's Wembley Arena, the final show of their 2013 tour. It is available as a double-CD album, DVD, Blu-ray and deluxe box set and was released on 9 June 2014. The DVD debuted at number 1 on the Billboard Music Video Sales Chart.

== Track listing ==
All tracks are written by Pete Townshend.

Standard Edition CD, DVD & Blu-ray
No.	Title	Lead vocal	Length
1.	"I Am the Sea"	Roger Daltrey	2:09
2.	"The Real Me"	Daltrey	3:21
3.	"Quadrophenia"	Instrumental	6:14
4.	"Cut My Hair"	Pete Townshend	3:45
5.	"The Punk and the Godfather"	Daltrey with Townshend on bridge	5:11
6.	"I'm One"	Townshend	2:38
7.	"The Dirty Jobs"	Simon Townshend, Daltrey	4:30
8.	"Helpless Dancer" (Roger's theme)	Daltrey and Townshend	2:34
9.	"Is It in My Head?"	Daltrey	3:44
10.	"I've Had Enough"	Daltrey and Townshend	6:15
11.	"5:15" (with video recording of John Entwistle’s bass solo)	Daltrey, Townshend (intro and outro)	5:01
12.	"Sea and Sand"	Daltrey and Townshend	5:02
13.	"Drowned"	Townshend	5:28
14.	"Bell Boy" (Keith's theme)	Keith Moon (via recording) and Daltrey	4:56
15.	"Doctor Jimmy" (containing "Is It Me?", John's theme)	Daltrey	8:37
16.	"The Rock"	Instrumental	6:38
17.	"Love, Reign o'er Me" (Pete's theme)	Daltrey	5:49
18.	"Who Are You"	Daltrey	6:27
19.	"You Better You Bet"	Daltrey	5:35
20.	"Pinball Wizard"	Daltrey and Townshend	2:53
21.	"Baba O'Riley"	Daltrey	5:27
22.	"Won't Get Fooled Again"	Daltrey	9:06
23.	"Tea & Theatre"	Daltrey	3:58

=== Deluxe Edition ===
The deluxe edition contains:

- Concert Blu-ray
- Concert DVD
- Concert double-CD
- 5.1 surround sound mix of the full original 1973 Quadrophenia album
- 10-inch metal "mod scooter headlight" box
- Mod headlight badge
- 6-inch mod headlight sticker
- 32-page booklet with photos and liner notes

== Personnel ==
The Who

- Pete Townshend – guitars, vocals
- Roger Daltrey – vocals, tambourine, harmonica, acoustic guitar

with:

- John Entwistle – bass solo on "5:15" (from video recording live show, 27 November 2000, at Royal Albert Hall)
- Keith Moon – vocals on "Bell Boy" (from video recording of live show, 18 May 1974, at Charlton)

Additional musicians

- Simon Townshend – guitars, backing vocals (lead vocals on "The Dirty Jobs")
- Frank Simes – keyboards, musical director, backing vocals
- Pino Palladino – bass
- Scott Devours – drums, percussion
- John Corey – piano, keyboards, backing vocals
- Loren Gold – keyboards, backing vocals
- Dylan Hart – horns
- Reggie Grisham – horns

== Charts ==
Chart (2014)	Peak position
Austrian Albums (Ö3 Austria)	73
Italy (FIMI DVD Chart)	1
UK Albums (OCC)	28
US Billboard 200	118
US Top Hard Rock Albums (Billboard)	11
US Top Rock Albums (Billboard)	35
