= No Plan B (band) =

English rock band

- Also known as: Roger Daltrey Band
- Origin: Los Angeles, California, US
- Genres: Rock; art rock; hard rock; power pop
- Years active: 2009–present
- Label: None
- Members: Roger Daltrey; Jon Button; Scott Devours; Loren Gold; Frank Simes; Simon Townshend
- Website: Roger Daltrey at Thewho.com

No Plan B, also known as the Roger Daltrey Band, is an English rock band assembled by the Who singer Roger Daltrey to support performances and tours outside the Who. Daltrey's band includes Simon Townshend (brother of Pete Townshend) on guitar and vocals, Frank Simes on lead guitar, Jon Button on bass, Loren Gold on keyboards and Scott Devours on drums. Frank Simes is also musical director for the band. In a 2010 appearance on The Alan Titchmarsh Show, Daltrey called the band No Plan B.

== History ==
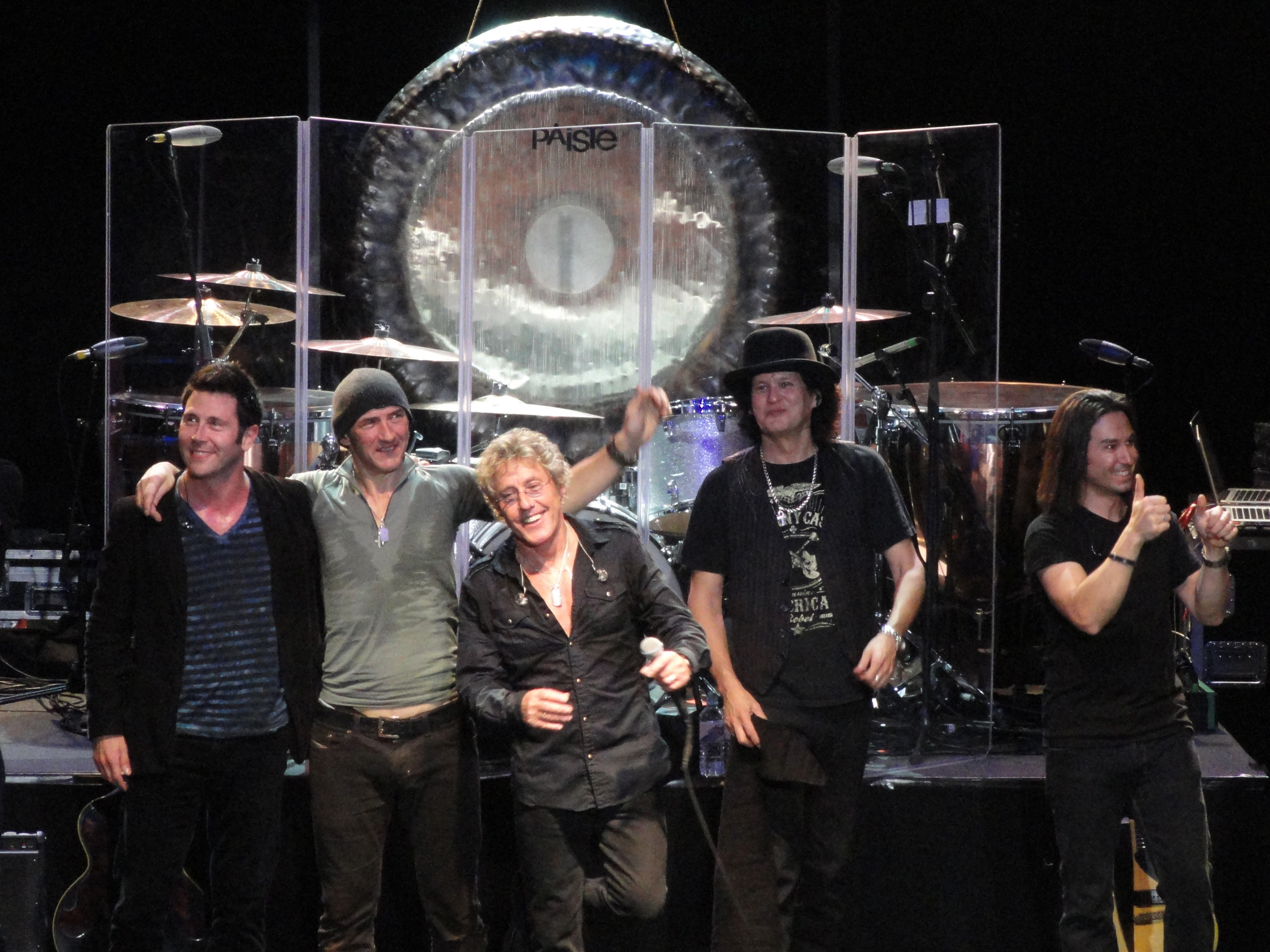
Daltrey at center with band members at Royal Albert Hall in March 2011.

In 2009 Roger Daltrey embarked on a tour of the U.S. and Canada with a new band assembled in Los Angeles, California. During 2010, the band performed as the support act for Eric Clapton, as well as performing additional solo shows.

In 2011, the band embarked on the Tommy Reborn tour, which included a special benefit show for the Teenage Cancer Trust (of which Daltrey is a patron) at the Royal Albert Hall in London on March 24, 2011. Pete Townshend joined the band onstage at this show for the songs "The Acid Queen" and "Baba O'Riley", and violinist Charlie Siem played the violin solo in "Baba O'Riley". In 2011 the band toured the UK performing the Who's Tommy, followed by dates in Europe, the US and Canada. The AEG Live-produced tour North American tour launched in Hollywood, Florida, at the Seminole Hard Rock September 13 and wrapped in Calgary, Alberta at the Scotiabank Saddledome. All shows were well-received, and the band booked additional dates in Europe and Japan for 2012.

Set lists have included music from the Who, from Daltrey's solo albums, and various covers of other material including two songs from Largo, a little-known 1998 album which Daltrey has specified onstage. Harmonies performed by Daltrey's band has allowed them to perform Who songs that have remained unperformed since as far back as the 1960s. At the October 12, 2009 show in Seattle, Pearl Jam singer Eddie Vedder joined Daltrey on stage for performances of Pearl Jam's "Better Man" and the Who's "The Real Me" and "Bargain". The band was joined on stage by Ronnie Wood, Paul Weller, Kelly Jones and Michael Miley at the 28 March 2012 Royal Albert Hall performance for the Teenage Cancer Trust.

== Set list ==
=== 2009 ===
1. "Who Are You"
2. "The Real Me"
3. "Pictures Of Lily"
4. "Behind Blue Eyes"
5. "Tattoo"
6. "Days of Light"
7. "Freedom Ride" (Note: This song appears on the album Largo)
8. "Gimme A Stone"
9. "Going Mobile"
10. "I'm A Man"/"My Generation Blues"
11. "I Can See For Miles"
12. "Squeeze Box"
13. "Who's Gonna Walk On Water"
14. "Young Man Blues"
15. "Baba O'Riley"
16. "Johnny Cash Medley"
17. "Born on the Bayou"
18. "Naked Eye"
19. "Blue, Red & Grey"
20. "Without Your Love"

Other songs:

- "A Second Out" (until October 28)
- "Two Thousand Years" (only on October 10)
- "Boris The Spider" (only on October 10 and 22)
- "Cache Cache" (only on October 10)
- "Giving It All Away" (only on October 12)
- "Better Man" (only on October 12)
- "Shakin' All Over" (only on October 12 and 14)
- "Bargain" (only on October 12)
- "The Kids Are Alright"
- "Pinball Wizard"
- "Won't Get Fooled Again" (only on October 14)
- "Summertime Blues" (only on October 14 and 17)

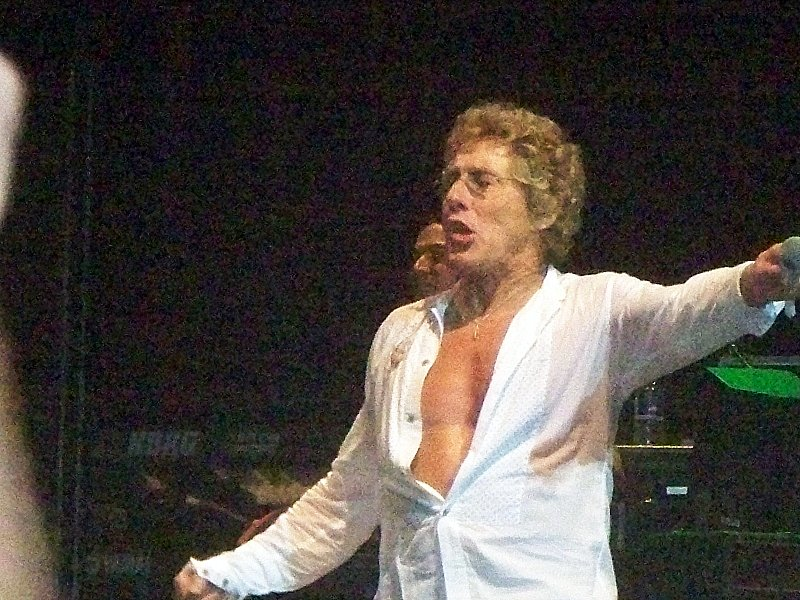
Roger Daltrey in Boston's House of Blues, in 2009

== Tour dates ==
=== 2009 U.S. Tour (The Use It or Lose It Tour) ===
- 10/10/09: Commodore Ballroom - Vancouver
- 12/10/09: Showbox SODO - Seattle, Washington
- 14/10/09: "Oracle Event" - San Francisco, California
- 15/10/09: San Manuel Indian Casino - Highland, California
- 17/10/09: Orpheum Theatre - Los Angeles, California
- 18/10/09: Humphrey's - San Diego, California
- 20/10/09: Paramount Theatre - Denver, Colorado
- 22/10/09: WinStar Casino - Thackerville, Oklahoma
- 24/10/09: Hard Rock Cafe - Biloxi, Mississippi
- 25/10/09: Florida Theatre - Jacksonville, Florida
- 28/10/09: Durham PAC - Durham, North Carolina
- 30/10/09: Ryman Auditorium - Nashville, Tennessee
- 31/10/09: Horseshoe Southern - Elizabeth, Indiana
- 02/11/09: House Of Blues - Chicago, Illinois
- 03/11/09: House Of Blues - Cleveland, Ohio
- 05/11/09: Casino Rama Ent Centre - Orillia
- 07/11/09: MGM Grand Theatre at Foxwoods - Mashantucket, Connecticut
- 08/11/09: House Of Blues - Boston, Massachusetts
- 11/11/09: Wellmont Theatre - Montclair, New Jersey
- 13/11/09: The Borgata - Atlantic City, New Jersey
- 14/11/09: The Borgata - Atlantic City, New Jersey
- 17/11/09: Count Basie Theatre - Red Bank, New Jersey
- 18/11/09: Chrysler Theatre Hall - Norfolk, Virginia
- 20/11/09: Nokia Theatre Times Square - New York, New York
- 22/11/09: The Fillmore - Charlotte, North Carolina
- 24/11/09: North Charleston CColosseum- North Charleston, South Carolina
- 25/11/09: House Of Blues - Buena Vista, Florida
- 27/11/09: Barbara Mann Performing Arts Hall - Fort Myers, Florida
- 29/11/09: Hard Rock Arena - Hollywood, Florida
- 30/11/09: Ruth Eckerd Hall - Clearwater, Florida

=== 2010 ===
The following dates were performed in support of Eric Clapton:

- 25/2/2010: Mellon Arena - Pittsburgh, Pennsylvania
- 27/2/2010: Sommet Center - Nashville, Tennessee
- 28/2/2010: BJCC Arena - Birmingham, Alabama
- 02/3/2010: BOK Center - Tulsa, Oklahoma
- 03/3/2010: Sprint Center - Kansas City, Missouri
- 05/3/2010: FedEx Forum - Memphis, Tennessee
- 06/3/2010: New Orleans Arena - New Orleans, Louisiana
- 08/3/2010: RBC Center - Raleigh, North Carolina
- 09/3/2010: Gwinnett Center - Atlanta, Georgia
- 11/3/2010: BankAtlantic Center - Sunrise, Florida
- 13/3/2010: Amway Center - Orlando, Florida

During The Summer, Roger also performed the following solo dates:

- 22/6/2010: Anselmo Valencia Tori Amphitheater - Tucson, Arizona
- 23/6/2010: HP Tech Forum - Las Vegas, Nevada
- 25/6/2010: Stiefel Theatre - Salina, Kansas
- 26/6/2010: Uptown Theater - Kansas City, Missouri

These were followed by more dates supporting Clapton:

- 28/6/2010: Marcus Amphitheater (Summerfest) - Milwaukee, Wisconsin
- 30/6/2010: Riverbend Music Center - Cincinnati, Ohio
- 02/7/2010: Verizon Wireless Music Center - Indianapolis, Indiana
- 03/7/2010: DTE Energy Music Theatre - Detroit, Michigan

=== 2011 (Tommy Reborn Tour) ===
- 19/3/2011: O2 Academy - Bournemouth, UK
- 24/3/2011: Royal Albert Hall - London, UK
- 03/7/2011: Civic Hall - Wolverhampton, UK
- 04/7/2011: The Sage - Gateshead, UK
- 06/7/2011: Clyde Auditorium - Glasgow, UK
- 07/7/2011: Bridgewater Hall - Manchester, UK
- 09/7/2011: Royal Centre - Nottingham, UK
- 10/7/2011: Newport Centre - Newport, UK
- 12/7/2011: Colston Hall - Bristol, UK
- 13/7/2011: Cliffs Pavilion - Westcliff-on-Sea, UK
- 15/7/2011: GuilFest - Guildford, UK
- 16/7/2011: Broadlands - Hampshire, UK
- 19/7/2011: City Hall - Hull, UK
- 21/7/2011: Indigo2 - London, UK
- 22/7/2011: Blickling Hall - Norwich, UK
- 24/7/2011: IndigO2 - London, UK
- 26/7/2011: Marlay Park - Dublin, Ireland
- 28/7/2011: Royal Hall - Isle of Man
- 30/7/2011: Lokerse Festival - Lokeren, Belgium
- 31/7/2011: Valdemars Slot - Tåsinge, Denmark
- 13/9/2011: Hollywood, Florida Seminole Hard Rock
- 15/9/2011: Alpharetta, Georgia Verizon Wireless Pavilion
- 17/9/2011: Boston, Massachusetts Agganis Arena
- 18/9/2011: Newark, New Jersey Prudential Center
- 21/9/2011: Philadelphia, Pennsylvania MANN Center
- 23/9/2011: Uniondale, New York Nassau Coliseum
- 24/9/2011: Hartford, Connecticut XL Center
- 27/9/2011: Montreal, Quebec Place Des Arts
- 28/9/2011: Ottawa, Ontario Scotiabank Place
- 30/9/2011: Toronto, Ontario Sony Centre For The Performing Arts
- 1/10/2011: Windsor, Ontario The Coliseum at Caesars Windsor
- 4/10/2011: Minneapolis, Minnesota U.S. Bank Theater at Target Center
- 7/10/2011: Hammond, Indiana Venue at Horseshoe Casino
- 8/10/2011: St. Louis, Missouri Peabody Opera House
- 11/10/2011: Cedar Park, Texas Cedar Park Center
- 12/10/2011: Grand Prairie, Texas Verizon Theatre
- 14/10/2011: Kansas City, Missouri The Midland by AMC
- 16/10/2011: Broomfield, Colorado 1STBANK Center
- 19/10/2011: Los Angeles, California NOKIA Theatre
- 21/10/2011: San Jose, California San Jose Civic
- 22/10/2011: Paradise, Nevada The Joint
- 24/10/2011: Portland, Oregon Rose Quarter-Theatre of the Clouds
- 25/10/2011: Seattle, Washington KeyArena at Seattle Center
- 27/10/2011: Vancouver, British Columbia Rogers Arena
- 29/10/2011: Edmonton, Alberta Rexall Place
- 30/10/2011: Calgary, Alberta Scotiabank Saddledome

Dates cancelled:

- 1/11/2011: Saskatoon, Saskatchewan Credit Union Centre
- 2/11/2011: Winnipeg, Manitoba MTS Centre

=== 2012 ===
- 15/1/2012: Yeovil, England, The Mermaid Hotel
- 9/3/2012: Padova, Italy, Teatro Geox
- 11/3/2012: Genova, Italy, Teatro Carolo Felice
- 12/3/2012: Torino, Italy, Teatro Colosseo
- 15/3/2012: Paris, France, L'Olympia Gerard Drouot
- 18/3/2012: Trieste, Italy, Teatro Rossetti
- 20/3/2012: Firenze, Italy, Teatro Comunale
- 21/3/2012: Rome, Italy, Auditorium Della Conciliazione
- 23/3/2012: Rome, Italy, Auditorium Della Conciliazione
- 24/3/2012: Milan, Italy, Teatro Smeraldo
- 28/3/2012: London, England, Royal Albert Hall
- 23/4/2012: Tokyo, Japan, Tokyo International Forum
- 24/4/2012: Tokyo, Japan, Tokyo International Forum
- 27/4/2012: Kanagawa, Japan, Kanagawa Kenmin Hall
- 28/4/2012: Osaka, Japan, Osaka Archaic Hall
- 30/4/2012: Nagoya, Japan, Nagoya Shi Kokaido
