= Greatest Hits (The Who album) =

Greatest hits album by the Who
- Released: 22 December 2009
- Recorded: 1964–2006
- Genre: Rock
- Length: 78:29
- Label: Geffen

The Who chronology
Amazing Journey: The Story of The Who (2008)	Greatest Hits (2009)	Greatest Hits Live (2010)

Professional ratings
Review scores
Source	Rating
AllMusic	4/5 stars
AltSounds	81%

Greatest Hits is a greatest hits album by the English rock band the Who that was released on 21 December 2009. The album was also re-released as Greatest Hits & More several weeks after the initial release, which featured a second disc of live songs culled from Greatest Hits Live (2010).

== Track listing ==
All songs written by Pete Townshend except where noted.

=== Disc one ===
1. "I Can't Explain" – 2:05
2. "My Generation" – 3:17
3. "The Kids Are Alright" – 3:07
4. "Substitute" – 3:48
5. "Happy Jack" – 2:11
6. "Pictures of Lily" – 2:44
7. "I Can See for Miles" – 4:08
8. "Magic Bus" – 3:16
9. "Pinball Wizard" – 3:02
10. "Behind Blue Eyes" – 3:43
11. "Baba O'Riley" – 5:01
12. "Won't Get Fooled Again" – 8:33
13. "Love, Reign o'er Me" – 5:54
14. "Squeeze Box" – 2:42
15. "Who Are You" (United States single edit) – 3:27
16. "You Better You Bet" – 5:38
17. "Eminence Front" – 5:42
18. "Real Good Looking Boy" (Townshend, Luigi Creatore, Hugo Peretti, George David Weiss) – 5:43
19. "It's Not Enough" (Townshend, Rachel Fuller) – 4:04

=== Disc two ===
1. "I Can't Explain" (San Francisco Civic Auditorium, San Francisco, 1971) – 2:32
2. "Substitute" (San Francisco Civic Auditorium, San Francisco, 1971) – 2:10
3. "Happy Jack" (City Hall, Hull, England, 1970) – 2:12
4. "I'm a Boy" (City Hall, Hull, England, 1970) – 2:42
5. "Behind Blue Eyes" (San Francisco Civic Auditorium, San Francisco, 1971) – 3:39
6. "Pinball Wizard" (Vetch Field, Swansea, Wales, 1976) – 2:48
7. "I'm Free" (Vetch Field, Swansea, Wales, 1976) – 1:44
8. "Squeeze Box" (Vetch Field, Swansea, Wales, 1976) – 2:51
9. "Naked Eye/Let's See Action/My Generation (Medley)" (Charlton Athletic Football Club, Charlton, London, England, 1974) – 14:19
10. "5:15" (Capital Centre, Largo, Maryland, 1973) – 5:53*
11. "Won't Get Fooled Again" (Capital Centre, Largo, Maryland, 1973) – 8:38*
12. "Magic Bus" (University of Leeds Refectory, University of Leeds, Leeds, England, 1970) – 7:33
13. "My Generation" (Aeolian Hall, London, England, 1965 – BBC recording) – 3:25
14. "I Can See for Miles" (Universal Amphitheatre, Los Angeles, 1989) – 3:45
15. "Who Are You" (Universal Amphitheatre, Los Angeles, 1989) – 6:22
16. "A Man in a Purple Dress" (Nassau Coliseum, Uniondale, New York, 2007) – 4:28

+ 17. bonus track on the Japanese Universal edition only: "Dancing in the Street" (Spectrum, Philadelphia, 1979) – 3:43

*These 2 tracks from 1973 are mislabelled, the recording comes from a show in Philadelphia.

== Credits (Disc 1) ==
- Roger Daltrey – lead vocals; harmonica (tracks 1–19)
- John Entwistle – bass guitar, vocals (tracks 1–17)
- Keith Moon – drums (tracks 1–15)
- Pete Townshend – guitars, vocals; keyboards (tracks 1–19); lead vocals (track 18)
- Kenney Jones – drums (tracks 16–17)
- John Bundrick – piano (track 18)
- Greg Lake – bass (track 18)
- Zak Starkey – drums (track 18)
- Simon Townshend – guitar, keyboards (track 18)
- Jolyon Dixon – acoustic guitars (track 19)
- Peter Huntington – drums (track 19)
- Stuart Ross – bass (track 19)
