= Amazing Journey: The Story of The Who (soundtrack) =

Soundtrack album by the Who
- Released: 1 April 2008
- Recorded: 1964–2006
- Genre: Rock
- Length: 82:00
- Label: Geffen

The Who chronology
View from a Backstage Pass (2007)	Amazing Journey: The Story of The Who (2008)	Greatest Hits (2009)

Amazing Journey: The Story of The Who is a compilation of songs featured in the documentary of the same name. This soundtrack was only released in Best Buy stores in the United States.

== Track listing ==
All songs written by Pete Townshend except where noted.

1. "Leaving Here" (Lamont Dozier, Brian Holland & Edward Holland) – 2:50 (Note: Although the label states that this is the 1964 version of "Leaving Here", recorded by the High Numbers and first released on the expanded Odds & Sods in 1998, the version contained is actually the second recorded studio version of "Leaving Here", recorded by the Who in April 1965 and first released in 1985 on the US Who's Missing compilation.)
2. "I Can't Explain" – 2:06
3. "My Generation" – 3:19
4. "I'm a Boy" – 2:38
5. "I Can See for Miles" – 4:08
6. "Amazing Journey" – 5:07
7. "Pinball Wizard" – 3:03
8. "Summertime Blues" (Live at Leeds) (Jerry Capehart & Eddie Cochran) – 3:25
9. "Baba O'Riley" – 5:01
10. "The Song Is Over" – 6:16
11. "Sea and Sand" – 5:04
12. "Who Are You" – 5:09
13. "Eminence Front" – 5:38
14. "Won't Get Fooled Again" (Live at The Concert for New York City) – 9:21
15. "Real Good Looking Boy" (Townshend, Luigi Creatore, Hugo Peretti & George David Weiss) – 5:43
16. "Tea & Theatre" – 3:22

== Personnel ==
Design

- Cover design by Richard Evans
