= Bell Boy (song) =

Song by the Who

from the album Quadrophenia
- Released: 19 October 1973
- Recorded: 1 June 1973
- Studio: Olympic and "The Kitchen" in Battersea, London
- Genre: Rock
- Length: 4:55
- Label: MCA
- Songwriter: Pete Townshend
- Producers: The Who; Kit Lambert; Glyn Johns

"Bell Boy" is a song recorded by the English rock band the Who for their sixth studio album Quadrophenia (1973) and the 1979 film of the same name. It was never released as a single.

== Music and lyrics ==
Besides the main lead vocals by lead singer Roger Daltrey, the song features vocals by drummer Keith Moon (most of whose relatively few vocals for the band dated from the '60s). Moon mostly talks (or sings) his lines in a cartoonish voice with an exaggerated cockney accent; however, the bridge and the last line are sung in his natural voice.

Lyrically, this is the final straw for Jimmy, having just found out that the Ace Face he had looked up to as a Mod was now working as a bell boy at the same Brighton hotel that the Mods had previously smashed up ("I don't suppose you would remember me/But I used to follow you back in '63") instead of ruling over everyone. The previous lines ("Ain't you the guy who used to set the paces/Riding up in front of a hundred faces") refer to the "Hundred Faces", a fan club set up by the Who's managers Kit Lambert and Chris Stamp to promote the group in their early days.

In the short story written by Townshend in the album's libretto/liner notes, it is explained that Jimmy never thought he'd be let down by being a Mod (given everything else had let him down). Pete Townshend said of the song's meaning:

He meets an old Ace Face who's now a bellhop at the very hotel the Mods tore up. And he looks on Jimmy with a mixture of pity and contempt, really, and tells him, in effect, 'Look, my job is shit and my life is a tragedy. But you – look at you, you're dead!'

— Pete Townshend

== Live history ==
The band performed this in The Who Tour 1973 and 1974 as part of their Quadrophenia set. This quickly became a fan favourite because of Moon's comedic vocals, and fans persisted on requesting it even after it was dropped in 1975 until Moon's death. The song was revived for the 1996–1997 Quadrophenia world tour, but with the Ace-Face guest replacing Moon's role. The song was performed once more at the Royal Albert Hall in London on 30 March 2010 at a benefit concert for the Teenage Cancer Trust. Tom Meighan of Kasabian sang Moon's part during the show. At Quadrophenia and More shows and 12-12-12: The Concert for Sandy Relief, it was performed with archival video footage of Keith Moon in Charlton.

== Personnel ==
- Roger Daltrey – lead vocals, backing vocals
- Pete Townshend – lead guitar, backing vocals, synthesizer, piano
- John Entwistle – bass guitar, backing vocals, French horn
- Keith Moon – co-lead vocals, drums

== In other media ==
Martin Scorsese reprised the song for the soundtrack of his 1999 film Bringing Out The Dead.
