= Loren Gold =

American musician

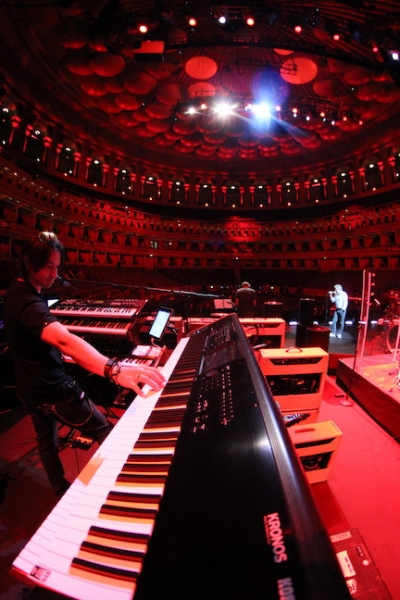
- Loren Gold with The Who at Royal Albert Hall

Background information
- Born: December 8, 1983; Palo Alto, California, U.S.
- Genres: Rock; pop
- Occupation: Musician
- Instruments: Keyboards; vocals
- Website: lorengold.com

Loren Gold is an American keyboardist, vocalist, music director, and songwriter. He is known for his work as a touring keyboardist with prominent rock and pop acts, including Don Felder, Kenny Loggins, Roger Daltrey, The Who, Chicago, and Rush.

As a music director, Gold has led world tours for artists such as Selena Gomez, Demi Lovato, Hilary Duff, and American Idol winner Taylor Hicks (for whom he co-wrote the song "The Runaround"). In 2010, he worked on the Who's halftime show at Super Bowl XLIV.

== Career history ==
=== Music director ===
Gold toured in fall 2003 as the keyboard player for Hilary Duff, and continued as her musical director until 2007. In winter 2007, Gold co-wrote with the Canadian songwriter James Renald the first single for the American Idol winner Taylor Hicks, entitled "The Runaround". Television and national performances of "The Runaround" took place starting in December 2006. Gold became the musical director and keyboard player for Taylor, touring extensively in 2007. In 2008, Gold toured with Mandy Moore in support of her album, Wild Hope in Australia and the Philippines. In Winter 2008/2009, he continued playing keyboards with the NBC production America's Got Talent and ABC's Dancing with the Stars.

In 2008–09, Gold became music director and consultant for several pop artists, including Demi Lovato, Jordan Pruitt, Jordin Sparks and Selena Gomez. During spring 2008, Gold began performing with Don Felder of the Eagles, shortly followed as a keyboardist and vocalist for Kenny Loggins. An original Gold/Renald composition, entitled "Pretend", was used in the 2009 Walden Media film Bandslam and featured on its soundtrack, available on Hollywood Records.

=== Roger Daltrey ===
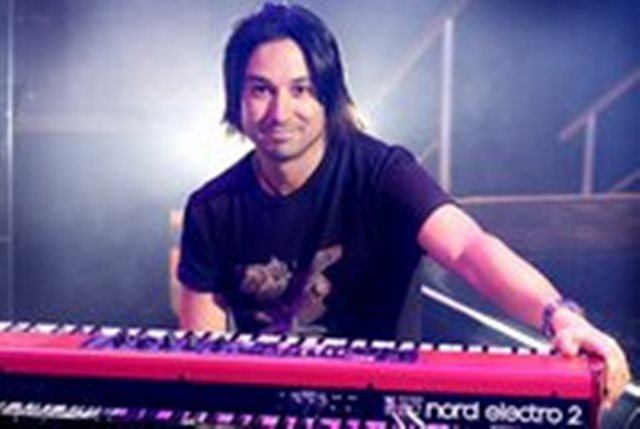
Gold in 2011

In 2009, Gold became the keyboard player and vocalist for Roger Daltrey's Use It or Lose It Tour. Daltrey's band, No Plan B, also opened for Eric Clapton on several dates during 2010. At the show of October 12, 2009, in Seattle, Pearl Jam singer Eddie Vedder joined the band on stage for performances of Pearl Jam's "Better Man", and the Who's "The Real Me" and "Bargain".

In December 2010, Gold was asked to be the musical director for the Y&T benefit concert in Santa Clara. Gold performed with several guests, including Geoff Tate of Queensrÿche, Don Dokken of Dokken, and Vinny Appice of Dio and Black Sabbath.

In 2011, there were performances of the Who's Tommy and the hits of the Who, which included a performance for the Teenage Cancer Trust at Royal Albert Hall with Pete Townshend. On March 28, 2012, the band was joined on stage by Steve Winwood, Ronnie Wood, Paul Weller, Kelly Jones and Michael Miley for another Royal Albert Hall performance for the Teenage Cancer Trust. A world tour of Tommy continued throughout 2011–2012 with North America, Europe, and Japan.

=== The Who ===
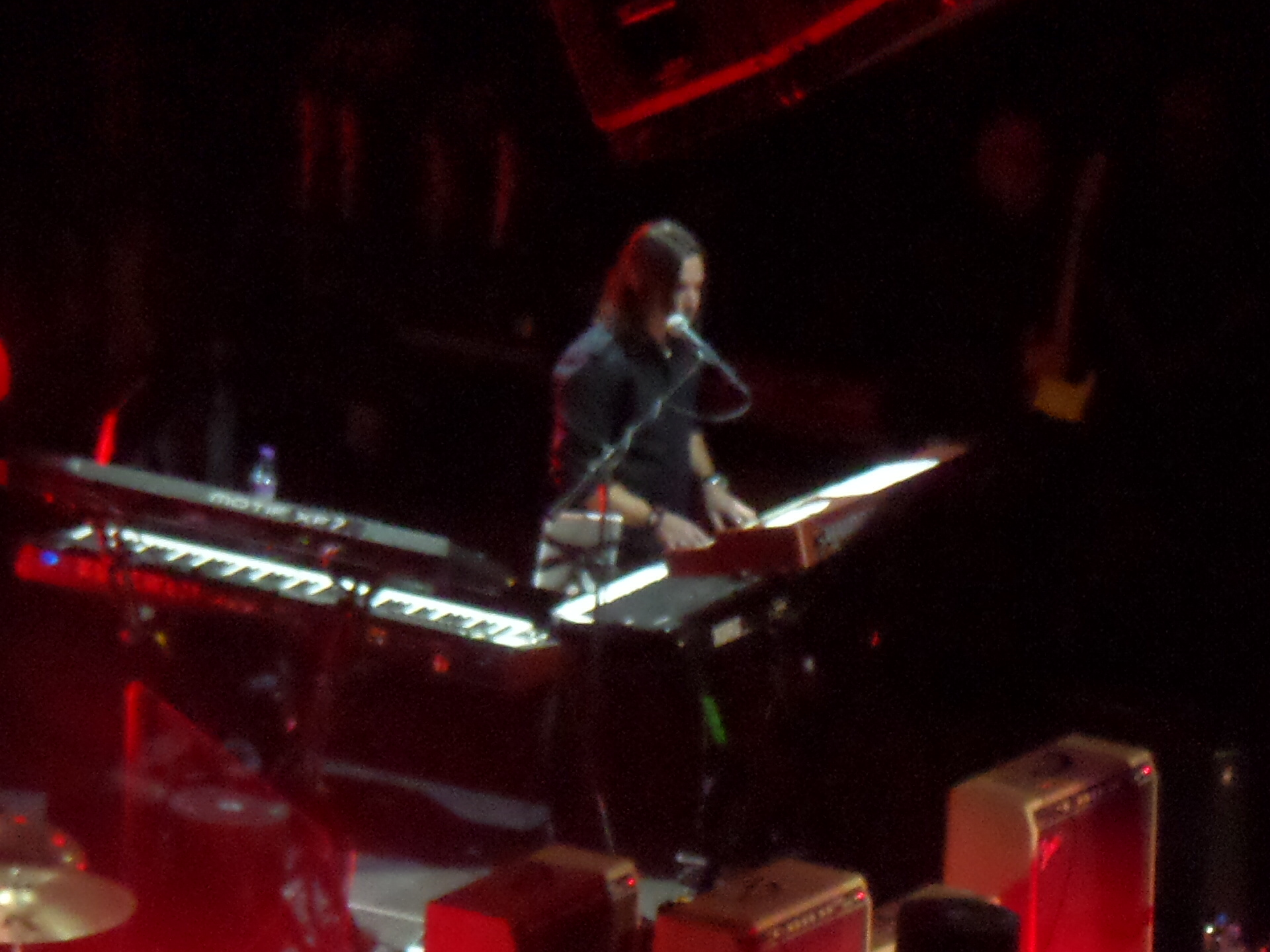
Gold performing live with the Who at Manchester Arena, 2014

In July 2012, the Who announced Gold as a keyboardist and backing vocalist on their 2012–2013 tour, where they played their album Quadrophenia in its entirety. The tour continued in the summer of 2013 with performances throughout Europe, concluding with a performance at Wembley Arena in London. Between the two legs of the tour, Gold performed at 12-12-12: The Concert for Sandy Relief – a benefit concert that took place on December 12, 2012, at Madison Square Garden in New York City. In addition to the Who, performers included Paul McCartney, the Rolling Stones, Billy Joel, Bruce Springsteen, and Roger Waters. It was the most widely distributed live musical event in history, accessible to nearly two billion people worldwide on television, radio and the Internet.

Prior to joining, Gold worked with the Who on their 2010 Super Bowl Halftime performance, helping edit and organize the arrangement of the performance.

Between performances with Roger Daltrey and the Who, Gold traveled to Japan and performed with veteran Tsuyoshi Nagabuchi. The tour, entitled "Arena Tour 2014 All Time Best", celebrated a career that has spanned over 30 years. Performances included the legendary Nippon Budokan in Tokyo and Yokohama arena. A live DVD was released following the tour. A final concert was added in 2015 at Mt Fuji, with 100,000 people in attendance.

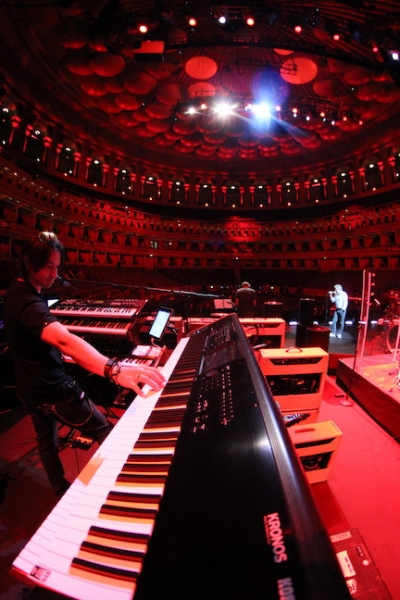
Loren Gold with The Who at Royal Albert Hall in 2020

In 2014, the Who announced The Who Hits 50! world tour, to celebrate the 50th anniversary of the band. The tour kicked off at a concert after the Abu Dhabi Grand Prix. Just prior, the Who appeared at London's Shepherd's Bush Empire on November 11 as part of the Who Hits 50! tribute night in aid of the Teenage Cancer Trust. Gold performed and sang back-up vocals, alongside the rest of the Who. Performers included Wilko Johnson, Kaiser Chiefs' Ricky Wilson, Geddy Lee of Rush (band), Joe Elliott of Def Leppard, the Strypes, Tom Odell, Amy Macdonald, Andy Burrows and Rizzle Kicks. Ricky Wilson was joined by Phil Daniels, the star of the 1979 film Quadrophenia for 'Bell Boy', which was originally released in 1973. Included during the 2015 tour were large, outdoor performances at Hyde Park and Glastonbury, with upwards of 200,000 people in attendance.

During a break between the Who's 2014–2015 world tour, Gold performed at the annual ARF Stars to the Rescue charity concert in January 2015, headed by Hall of Fame baseball manager Tony LaRussa. In 2013, Gold also performed with several members of Santana and Bruce Hornsby at the annual charity event. More ARF shows have followed, including performances with Huey Lewis and the News and Trace Adkins.

In May 2015, Gold performed with the Who touring band at the MusiCares Foundation in New York City, honoring the Who’s Pete Townshend and its manager, Bill Curbishley, with an all-star line-up that included Bruce Springsteen, Joan Jett, Billy Idol, Willie Nile, and Who lead vocalist Roger Daltrey.

Gold was featured as the "Stadium Ace" in the April 2016 issue of Keyboard magazine.

=== Chicago ===
In early August 2021, Gold joined Chicago as a touring substitute when he was asked to fill in for their longtime keyboardist/vocalist Lou Pardini, when he was mostly out for August and September until he was able to return. In February 2022, Gold became an official member of the band after Pardini announced in late January that he was leaving the group after 13 years.

=== Rush ===
On February 23, 2026, Rush announced that Gold will be the keyboardist for their Fifty Something tour.

=== Other artists ===
Gold has also recorded and/or worked with Natalie Maines, Eddie Vedder, Melissa Etheridge, Rita Wilson, Tate McRae, Mandy Moore, Eric McCormack, Nick Lachey, Gladys Knight, Dan Aykroyd, Andrew Gold, Kara DioGuardi, and others.

== Accolades ==
- American Idol Season Five (Gold Record Award)
- Taylor Hicks (Gold Record Award)
- Demi Lovato (Gold Record Award)
- Selena Gomez (Gold and Platinum Awards)
- Hilary Duff (Multi-Platinum Awards)

== Appearances ==
=== Live albums ===
- The Who With Orchestra: Live at Wembley
- Quadrophenia Live in London
- The Who Tommy Live At Albert Hall
- The Who Live In Hyde Park
- The Who 2017 Tommy & More
- Tsuyoshi Nagabuchi, All Night Live
- Tsuyoshi Nagabuchi, FUJI SANREI ALL NIGHT LIVE 2015

=== Film ===
- The Imitation Game
- Bandslam
- The Girl Can Rock
- Learning to Fly

=== Television ===
- Melrose Place
- Beverly Hills, 90210
- The Tonight Show
- The Oprah Winfrey Show
- Late Show with David Letterman
- The Ellen DeGeneres Show
- Today
- Good Morning America
- Jimmy Kimmel Live!
- The Early Show
- Dr. Phil
- Carson Daly
- American Music Awards
- Billboard Music Awards
- The Talk
- American Idol
- The Juno Awards 2026

== Works ==
In 2015, Gold released his first instructional book for Alfred Music. Entitled Sitting In: Blues Piano, it features backing tracks and improvisation lessons, and includes progressions in essential blues styles like boogie woogie, shuffle, gospel, blues-rock, and swing blues. Audio recordings contain sample solos, while the book provides tips focusing on scales, modes, comping patterns, and other ideas for developing an authentic blues vocabulary. The recordings feature a live band with piano, guitar, bass, harmonica, and drums. A second book was released in 2016, entitled Sitting In: Rock Piano, follows a similar format to the blues book.

Gold also composes instrumental music.
