= The Who Tour 2012–2013 =

2012–13 concert tour by the Who

Quadrophenia and More
- World tour by The Who
- Location: North America; Europe
- Associated album: Quadrophenia
- Start date: 12 August 2012
- End date: 8 July 2013
- Legs: 2
- No. of shows: 39 in North America; 13 in Europe; 52 in total
- Box office: $42.4 million ($58.6 million in 2025 dollars)

The Who concert chronology
- The Who 2011 performances (2011); Quadrophenia and More (2012–13); The Who Hits 50! (2014–16)

The Who Tour 2012–2013 was their third to feature the 1973 album Quadrophenia. Billed as "Quadrophenia and More", the band played Quadrophenia in its entirety, followed by a selection of their greatest hits. Before starting the tour, the group gave a special performance at the closing ceremonies of the 2012 Summer Olympics.

== History ==
The band gave their first performance since a January 2011 charity appearance during the closing ceremonies for the 2012 Summer Olympics on 12 August, performing a short medley comprising "Baba O'Riley", "See Me, Feel Me" and "My Generation". A few weeks earlier they had announced a two leg stint that would feature the Quadrophenia album for a third time. They toured behind the album's original release, but their use of backing tapes to duplicate its musical complexity caused problems when the tapes malfunctioned and the band had difficulty playing along to them. They revisited the rock opera during their 1996–97 tour, this time with much greater success.

An announcement about the tour came through the band's website and social media networks on 18 July and coincided with a promotional documentary for the album, entitled The Who: Quadrophenia – Can You See The Real Me? The documentary was only screened in select theatres on 24 July in the United States, and on 25 July in Canada. The documentary featured never before seen footage from the band's first Quadrophenia tour including footage from its opening night in San Francisco, California, In which drummer Keith Moon collapsed twice and resulted in Scot Halpin, an audience member, filling in for Moon. Tickets for the Who's official fan club were given the first opportunity to purchase tickets on 20 July. American Express cardholders were given a presale date of 23 July. General tickets went on sale 27 July. The Who also announced on 19 July that they would honour tickets for the band's cancelled show in Providence, Rhode Island from 1979, following the tragic concert disaster in Cincinnati at the Riverfront Coliseum, in which 11 people were trampled and killed. The tickets were honoured at their Providence show in 2013, the final date of the tour.

The band retained bass player Pino Palladino and guitarist/backing vocalist Simon Townshend for these shows, but parted ways with longtime keyboard player John "Rabbit" Bundrick. Keyboard player Chris Stainton, who had appeared on the original Quadrophenia album, played with the group for the closing ceremonies for the Summer Olympics and originally intended to join them for the tour as well, but he withdrew prior to the start of the tour to tour with Eric Clapton. Keyboardists John Corey and Loren Gold were instead added to the line-up along with keyboardist/arranger Frank Simes and a brass section. Drummer Zak Starkey missed several shows in February 2013 due to a tendon injury and was replaced for those dates by Scott Devours; Devours would again substitute for Starkey during the band's June–July European tour. The group tacked on an additional appearance as part of 12-12-12: The Concert for Sandy Relief at Madison Square Garden at the end of the 2012 segment of the tour and did the same for a Teen Cancer America charity event at the Theater at Madison Square Garden along with Elvis Costello at the end of the 2013 North American segment.

== Live releases ==
The show on 8 July 2013 at Wembley Arena (the last of the tour) was released as Quadrophenia Live in London.

== Tour band ==
=== Original members ===
- Roger Daltrey – lead vocals, harmonica, acoustic guitar, tambourine
- Pete Townshend – lead guitar, acoustic guitar, vocals
- John Entwistle – bass (via audio and archival footage on "5:15" filmed 27 November 2000 at Royal Albert Hall)
- Keith Moon – vocals (via audio and archival footage on "Bell Boy" filmed 18 May 1974 at Charlton)

=== Backing musicians ===
- Zak Starkey – drums (except on 5–14 February 2013; 8 June 2013 – 8 July 2013)
- Scott Devours – drums (5–14 February 2013; 8 June 2013 – 8 July 2013)
- Pino Palladino – bass guitar
- Simon Townshend – rhythm guitar, acoustic guitar, vocals, (keyboards at 2012 Summer Olympics closing ceremony)
- Billy Nicholls – musical director, backing vocals (2012 Summer Olympics closing ceremony)
- Morgan Nicholls – bass guitar (2012 Summer Olympics closing ceremony)
- Chris Stainton – piano, keyboards (2012 Summer Olympics closing ceremony)
- Loren Gold – keyboards, backing vocals
- Frank Simes - music director, keyboards, backing vocals
- John Corey – piano, keyboards, backing vocals
- J. Greg Miller – brass
- Reggie Grisham – brass

== Setlists ==
=== 2012 Summer Olympics Closing Ceremonies ===
1. "Baba O'Riley"
2. "See Me, Feel Me"
3. "My Generation"

=== Quadrophenia and More Tour ===
The tour got off to a problematic start during the encore at the first show in Sunrise, Florida when guitarist Pete Townshend left the stage during "You Better You Bet", claiming not to be able to hear the sound properly. The show ended prematurely with the rest of the group playing "Baba O'Riley" without him. Drummer Zak Starkey missed six shows from 5 to 14 February due to a tendon injury and was replaced with drummer Scott Devours, who had toured with Roger Daltrey a few years earlier. Devours again filled in for Starkey for the band's June–July European tour.

"Tea and Theatre", the final track from the group's 2006 album Endless Wire, once again closed most shows on the tour as in recent years.

All songs written by Pete Townshend.

1. "I Am the Sea"
2. "The Real Me"
3. "Quadrophenia"
4. "Cut My Hair"
5. "The Punk and the Godfather"
6. "I'm One"
7. "The Dirty Jobs"
8. "Helpless Dancer"
9. "Is It in My Head?"
10. "I've Had Enough"
11. "5.15"
12. "Sea and Sand"
13. "Drowned"
14. "Bell Boy"
15. "Doctor Jimmy"
16. "The Rock"
17. "Love, Reign o'er Me"
  (Encore)
18. "Who Are You"
19. "Behind Blue Eyes"
20. "Pinball Wizard" (not played on 3 and 5 November, 17 February)
21. "Baba O'Riley"
22. "Won't Get Fooled Again" (not played on 1 November)
23. "Tea and Theatre" (started closing shows on 3 November, but not played 17 February)

Other songs occasionally played were:

- "The Kids Are Alright" (Played on 3 and 5 November
- "Anyway, Anyhow, Anywhere" (Played on 3 November)
- "You Better You Bet" (played on 1 November and 15 June)

=== 12-12-12: The Concert for Sandy Relief Appearance ===
1. "Who Are You"
2. "Bell Boy"
3. "Pinball Wizard"
4. "See Me, Feel Me"/"Listening to You"
5. "Baba O'Riley"
6. "Love, Reign o'er Me"
7. "Tea and Theatre"

=== "WHO Cares" Teen Cancer America Benefit ===
1. "Who Are You"
2. "The Kids Are Alright"
3. "Behind Blue Eyes"
4. "Pinball Wizard"
5. "5.15"
6. "Drowned"
7. "You Better You Bet"
8. "Love, Reign o'er Me"
9. "Baba O'Riley"
10. "Won't Get Fooled Again"

== Tour dates ==
Date	City	Country	Venue	Attendance	Gross revenue
North America
1 November 2012	Sunrise	United States	BB&T Center	7,814 / 8,430	$676,550
3 November 2012	Orlando	United States	Amway Center	8,209 / 9,682	$691,889
5 November 2012	Duluth	United States	Arena at Gwinnett Center	7,576 / 9,264	$623,136
8 November 2012	Greenville	United States	BI-LO Center	7,256 / 8,913	$524,953
9 November 2012	Greensboro	United States	Greensboro Coliseum	7,631 / 8,970	$635,192
11 November 2012	Pittsburgh	United States	Consol Energy Center	8,318 / 9,603	$681,724
13 November 2012	Washington, D.C.	United States	Verizon Center	9,808 / 10,853	$880,986
14 November 2012	Brooklyn	United States	Barclays Center	11,567 / 11,624	$890,974
16 November 2012	Boston	United States	TD Garden	11,927 / 12,135	$966,739
20 November 2012	Montreal	Canada	Bell Centre	8,591 / 10,412	$639,260
21 November 2012	Ottawa	Canada	Scotiabank Place	7,145 / 9,011	$589,005
23 November 2012	Toronto	Canada	Air Canada Centre	12,334 / 12,974	$1,153,610
24 November 2012	Detroit	United States	Joe Louis Arena	10,783 / 12,652	$909,095
27 November 2012	Minneapolis	United States	Target Center	7,154 / 7,691	$513,964
29 November 2012	Rosemont	United States	Allstate Arena	21,380 / 22,858	$1,783,368
30 November 2012	Rosemont	United States	Allstate Arena	21,380 / 22,858	$1,783,368
2 December 2012	Nashville	United States	Bridgestone Arena	9,596 / 9,941	$742,965
5 December 2012	New York City	United States	Madison Square Garden	13,217 / 13,217	$1,296,908
6 December 2012	Newark	United States	Prudential Center	10,936 / 11,494	$930,461
8 December 2012	Philadelphia	United States	Wells Fargo Center	13,460 / 13,460	$1,279,110
9 December 2012	Uncasville	United States	Mohegan Sun Arena	5,059 / 5,059	$565,552
12 December 2012^{[A]}	New York City	United States	Madison Square Garden	—N/a	—N/a
28 January 2013	Anaheim	United States	Honda Center	8,338 / 10,138	$771,655
30 January 2013	Los Angeles	United States	Staples Center	11,634 / 11,634	$1,014,474
1 February 2013	Oakland	United States	Oracle Arena	11,676 / 11,676	$1,029,917
2 February 2013	Reno	United States	Reno Events Center	5,782 / 5,782	$689,322
5 February 2013	San Diego	United States	Valley View Casino Center	7,693 / 8,829	$688,144
6 February 2013	Glendale	United States	Jobing.com Arena	6,770 / 7,585	$638,613
8 February 2013	Las Vegas	United States	The Joint	5,418 / 5,418	$968,169
10 February 2013	Las Vegas	United States	The Joint	5,418 / 5,418	$968,169
12 February 2013	Denver	United States	Pepsi Center	8,863 / 10,519	$815,544
14 February 2013	Tulsa	United States	BOK Center	7,216 / 9,822	$687,485
16 February 2013	Louisville	United States	KFC Yum! Center	10,673 / 13,791	$999,694
17 February 2013	Columbus	United States	Value City Arena	10,938 / 12,075	$953,777
19 February 2013	Hamilton	Canada	Copps Coliseum	9,112 / 10,774	$856,002
21 February 2013	Uniondale	United States	Nassau Veterans Memorial Coliseum	11,285 / 11,285	$999,950
22 February 2013	Atlantic City	United States	Boardwalk Hall	12,324 / 12,417	$1,083,091
24 February 2013	Manchester	United States	Verizon Wireless Arena	6,615 / 7,793	$658,170
26 February 2013	Providence	United States	Dunkin' Donuts Center	7,138 / 7,790	$682,034
28 February 2013	New York City	United States	The Theater at Madison Square Garden (Teen Cancer America Benefit)	—N/a	—N/a
Europe
8 June 2013	Dublin	Ireland	3Arena	—N/a	—N/a
10 June 2013	Belfast	Northern Ireland	Odyssey Arena	—N/a	—N/a
12 June 2013	Glasgow	Scotland	Scottish Exhibition and Conference Centre	—N/a	—N/a
15 June 2013	London	England	The O2	29,710 / 31,420	$3,171,600
16 June 2013	London	England	The O2	29,710 / 31,420	$3,171,600
18 June 2013	Sheffield	England	Motorpoint Arena Sheffield	—N/a	—N/a
20 June 2013	Newcastle	England	Metro Radio Arena	—N/a	—N/a
23 June 2013	Manchester	England	Manchester Arena	—N/a	—N/a
25 June 2013	Cardiff	Wales	Motorpoint Arena Cardiff	—N/a	—N/a
28 June 2013	Birmingham	England	LG Arena	—N/a	—N/a
30 June 2013	Liverpool	England	Echo Arena Liverpool	—N/a	—N/a
3 July 2013	Paris	France	Palais Omnisports de Paris-Bercy	—N/a	—N/a
5 July 2013	Amsterdam	Netherlands	Ziggo Dome	—N/a	—N/a
8 July 2013	London	England	Wembley Arena	—N/a	—N/a
TOTAL				370,946/406,991 (91%)	$33,683,082

Festivals and other miscellaneous performances
^{A} This concert was a part of "12-12-12: The Concert for Sandy Relief"

== Gross ==
- 2012: $16.9 million from 21 shows
- 2013: $25.5 million from 30 shows
- Total available gross: $42.4 million from 51 shows
