= The Who Hits 50! =

2014–2016 concert tour by the Who

- Tour by The Who
- Location: Middle East; Europe; North America
- Associated album: The Who Hits 50!
- Start date: 23 November 2014
- End date: 29 May 2016
- Legs: 5
- No. of shows: 49 in North America; 18 in Europe; 1 in the Middle East; 69 in total

The Who concert chronology
- Quadrophenia and More (2012–13); The Who Hits 50! (2014–16); Back to the Who Tour 51! (2016)

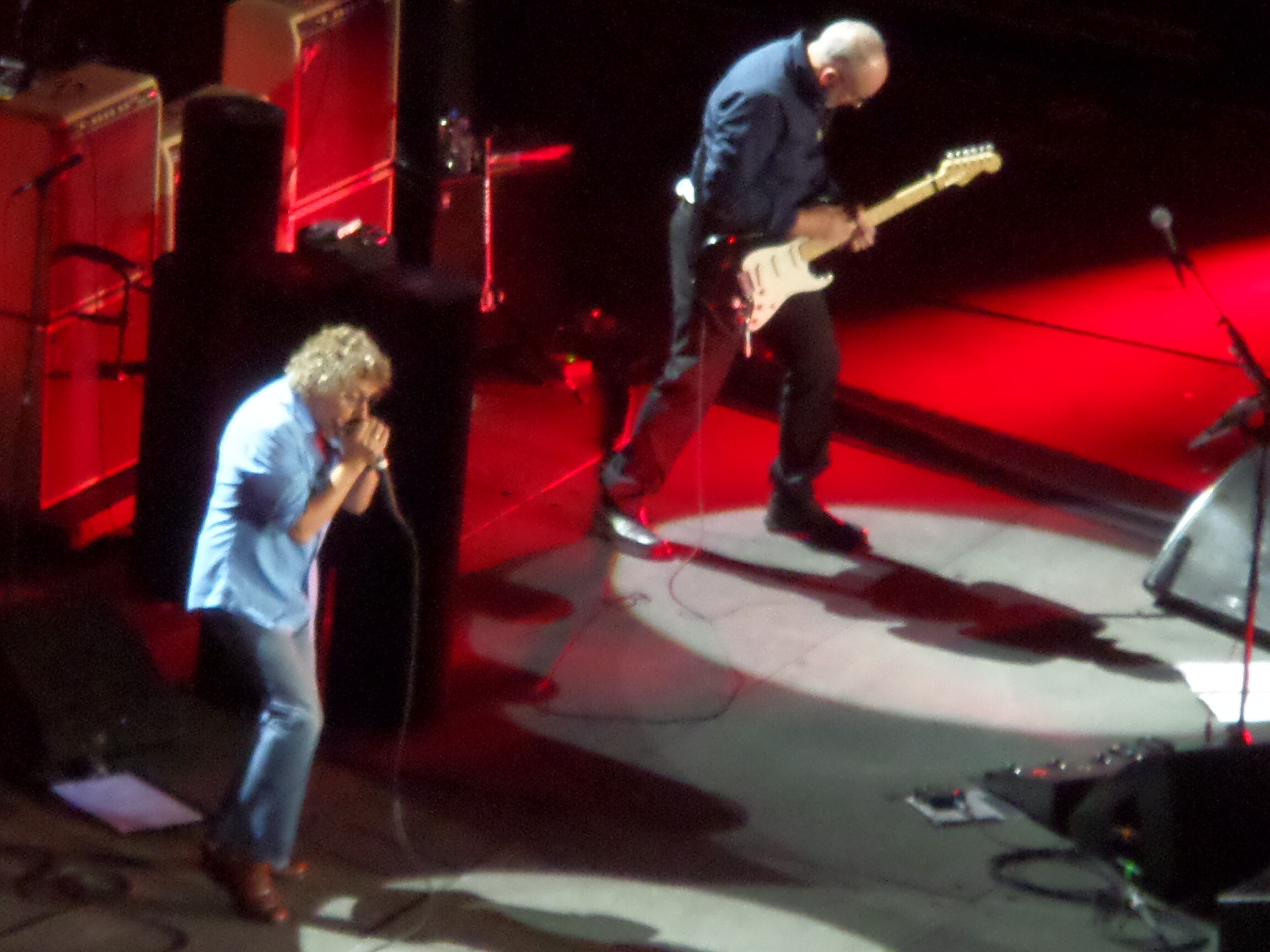
The Who live at Manchester Arena in 2014

Billed as The Who Hits 50!, the Who's 2014–16 tour was a tour celebrating the 50th anniversary of the band. Roger Daltrey has referred to this tour as the band's "long goodbye" hinting that it would be the final tour for the Who. The tour consisted of 70 dates with the band performing in Asia, Europe and North America.

An announcement about the tour came through the band's website and social media networks on 30 June 2014. Pete Townshend described the show as "Hits, Picks, Mixes and Misses", for the band would play all their classic anthems as well as tackling deeper cuts from their catalog;

In addition to longtime veterans Zak Starkey, Pino Palladino, and Simon Townshend, the same backing musicians from the group's previous tour were retained, minus the horn section.

In September 2015, the band announced that the fall 2015 North American leg was being postponed due to Daltrey contracting viral meningitis and told by doctors to rest. The tour resumed in February 2016 and ended on 29 May 2016.

== History ==
The tour kicked off with the group's first ever show in the United Arab Emirates, followed by a UK leg. The band included several numbers not included in any recent tours, including the first full performance of "A Quick One (While He's Away)" since 1970 and the first full band appearances of "So Sad About Us" (Townshend and special guest Paul Weller performed it acoustically at the Royal Albert Hall in 2000) since 1967; "Pictures of Lily" and "Join Together" had not been played since 1989. The North American leg, with Joan Jett and the Blackhearts featured as the opening act, kicked off in April 2015. Eddie Vedder joined the band for a performance of "The Real Me" in Chicago. Daltrey suffered a throat infection in September 2015 forcing the band to postpone the 2015 fall North American dates until February 2016. Tal Wilkenfeld was featured as the opening act when the North American tour resumed on 27 February 2016. Pete Townshend was suffering from his own ailments when the band hit Washington, D.C., on 24 March 2016. Townshend was suffering from a cold and losing his voice, so his brother Simon took over his backing vocals. However, he was able to make it through "Pinball Wizard" and "I'm One" despite his rough sounding voice. "Eminence Front", which had been featured in all of the shows, was dropped in favor of the unrehearsed and rarely played "Slip Kid" due to Townshend's hoarse voice. For most of the 2016 tour dates in North America, British band Slydigs performed a four-song opener for the Who, though the band's final North American concert in Las Vegas, Nevada, at the Colosseum at Caesars Palace did not feature an opening act.

== Tour band ==
=== Original members ===
- Roger Daltrey – lead vocals, harmonica, acoustic guitar, rhythm guitar, tambourine
- Pete Townshend – lead guitar, acoustic guitar, vocals
- John Entwistle – bass solo on "5:15" (via video and audio recording from Live at the Royal Albert Hall)
- Keith Moon – drums, vocals on "Bell Boy" (via audio recording from Quadrophenia)

=== Backing musicians ===
- Zak Starkey – drums, percussion
- Pino Palladino – bass guitar
- Simon Townshend – rhythm guitar, acoustic guitar, vocals
- Loren Gold – keyboards, backing vocals, percussion, jaw harp
- Frank Simes - keyboards, backing vocals, percussion, banjo, mandolin
- John Corey - keyboards, backing vocals, percussion, bass harmonica

== Set list ==
This set list is representative of the performance on 26 May 2016 in Brooklyn, New York. It does not represent all concerts for the duration of the tour.

1. "I Can't Explain"
2. "The Seeker"
3. "Who Are You"
4. "The Kids Are Alright"
5. "I Can See For Miles"
6. "My Generation"
7. "Behind Blue Eyes"
8. "Slip Kid"
9. "Bargain"
10. "Join Together"
11. "You Better You Bet"
12. "I'm One"
13. "Love, Reign O'er Me"
14. "Eminence Front"
15. "A Quick One (While He's Away)"
16. "Amazing Journey"
17. "Sparks"
18. "Pinball Wizard"
19. "See Me, Feel Me"
20. "Baba O'Riley"
21. "Won't Get Fooled Again"

== Tour dates ==
Date	City	Country	Venue	Tickets Sold/Available	Box Office	Opening Act
Leg 1 — Middle East
23 November 2014	Abu Dhabi	United Arab Emirates	du Arena	—	—	
Leg 2 — Europe
30 November 2014	Glasgow	Scotland	SSE Hydro	11,356 / 11,356	$1,214,320	
2 December 2014	Leeds	England	First Direct Arena	—	—	
5 December 2014	Nottingham	England	Capital FM Arena	—	—	
7 December 2014	Birmingham	England	Barclaycard Arena	—	—	
9 December 2014	Newcastle upon Tyne	England	Metro Radio Arena	—	—	
11 December 2014	Liverpool	England	Echo Arena Liverpool	—	—	
13 December 2014	Manchester	England	Phones 4u Arena	10,961 / 12,389	$1,185,690	
15 December 2014	Cardiff	Wales	Motorpoint Arena Cardiff	—	—	
22 March 2015	London	England	The O2 Arena	29,416 / 32,631	$3,160,040	
23 March 2015	London	England	The O2 Arena	29,416 / 32,631	$3,160,040	
26 March 2015	London	England	Royal Albert Hall	—	—	
Leg 3 — North America
15 April 2015	Tampa	United States	Amalie Arena	9,389 / 11,489	$905,569	Joan Jett & the Blackhearts
17 April 2015	Miami	United States	American Airlines Arena	—	—	Joan Jett & the Blackhearts
19 April 2015	Jacksonville	United States	Jacksonville Veterans Memorial Arena	—	—	Joan Jett & the Blackhearts
21 April 2015	Raleigh	United States	PNC Arena	—	—	Joan Jett & the Blackhearts
23 April 2015	Duluth	United States	Arena at Gwinnett Center	8,609 / 9,605	$823,017	Joan Jett & the Blackhearts
25 April 2015	New Orleans	United States	Fair Grounds Race Course	— (Note: The 25 April 2015 concert in New Orleans is a part of the New Orleans Jazz and Heritage Festival.)		
27 April 2015	Austin	United States	Frank Erwin Center	—	—	
29 April 2015	Houston	United States	Toyota Center	7,671 / 9,343	$860,080	
2 May 2015	Dallas	United States	American Airlines Center	—	—	
5 May 2015	Kansas City	United States	Sprint Center	—	—	
7 May 2015	St. Louis	United States	Scottrade Center	—	—	
9 May 2015	Louisville	United States	KFC Yum! Center	—	—	
11 May 2015	Nashville	United States	Bridgestone Arena	8,914 / 8,914	$626,547	
13 May 2015	Rosemont	United States	Allstate Arena	—	—	
15 May 2015	Columbus	United States	Nationwide Arena	—	—	
17 May 2015	Philadelphia	United States	Wells Fargo Center	12,383 / 12,383	$1,192,337	
20 May 2015	Uniondale	United States	Nassau Veterans Memorial Coliseum	—	—	
22 May 2015	Atlantic City	United States	Boardwalk Hall	—	—	
24 May 2015	Uncasville	United States	Mohegan Sun Arena	7,327 / 7,359	$1,023,826	
26 May 2015	Brooklyn	United States	Barclays Center	11,800 / 13,536	$1,131,705	
30 May 2015	Forest Hills, Queens	United States	Forest Hills Stadium	—	—	
Leg 4 — Europe
21 June 2015	Belfast	Northern Ireland	Odyssey Arena	—	—	
23 June 2015	Dublin	Ireland	3Arena	—	—	
26 June 2015	London	England	Hyde Park	— (Note: The 26 June 2015 concert in London is a part of British Summer Time.)		
28 June 2015	Pilton	England	Worthy Farm	135,000	— (Note: The 28 June 2015 concert in Pilton is a part of the Glastonbury Festival.)	
30 June 2015	Paris	France	Zénith de Paris	—	—	
2 July 2015	Amsterdam	Netherlands	Ziggo Dome	—	—	
13 February 2016	London	England	The SSE Arena, Wembley	—	—	
Leg 5 — North America
27 February 2016	Detroit	United States	Joe Louis Arena	13,468 / 13,468	$1,170,833	Tal Wilkenfeld
1 March 2016	Toronto	Canada	Air Canada Centre	9,514 / 10,636	$675,954	Tal Wilkenfeld
3 March 2016	New York City	United States	Madison Square Garden	14,863 / 14,863	$1,597,504	Tal Wilkenfeld
7 March 2016	Boston	United States	TD Garden	13,054 / 13,054	$1,289,318	Tal Wilkenfeld
10 March 2016	Chicago	United States	United Center	12,104 / 12,104	$1,254,813	Tal Wilkenfeld
12 March 2016	Louisville	United States	KFC Yum! Center	9,326 / 10,002	$747,946	Tal Wilkenfeld
14 March 2016	Philadelphia	United States	Wells Fargo Center	10,375 / 11,220	$969,884	Tal Wilkenfeld
16 March 2016	Pittsburgh	United States	Consol Energy Center	10,272 / 11,216	$829,134	Tal Wilkenfeld
19 March 2016	Newark	United States	Prudential Center	12,648 / 12,648	$1,282,646	Tal Wilkenfeld
21 March 2016	Milwaukee	United States	BMO Harris Bradley Center	10,212 / 10,689	$820,162	Tal Wilkenfeld
24 March 2016	Washington, D.C.	United States	Verizon Center	11,119 / 12,277	$1,143,938	Tal Wilkenfeld
26 March 2016	St. Louis	United States	Scottrade Center	9,515 / 10,316	$800,976	Tal Wilkenfeld
29 March 2016	Denver	United States	Pepsi Center	9,508 / 10,562	$732,862	Tal Wilkenfeld
27 April 2016	Toronto	Canada	Air Canada Centre	7,716 / 9,042	$694,197	Slydigs
29 April 2016	Kansas City	United States	Sprint Center	9,823 / 10,160	$881,221	Slydigs
1 May 2016	Minneapolis	United States	Target Center	8,212 / 10,031	$743,692	Slydigs
4 May 2016	Winnipeg	Canada	MTS Centre	6,822 / 7,853	$539,576	Slydigs
6 May 2016	Saskatoon	Canada	SaskTel Centre	7,308 / 8,138	$632,002	Slydigs
8 May 2016	Edmonton	Canada	Rexall Place	8,382 / 8,941	$789,407	Slydigs
10 May 2016	Calgary	Canada	Scotiabank Saddledome	9,472 / 10,630	$805,816	Slydigs
13 May 2016	Vancouver	Canada	Rogers Arena	11,484 / 12,021	$927,124	Slydigs
15 May 2016	Seattle	United States	KeyArena	11,863 / 12,099	$1,132,069	Slydigs
17 May 2016	Portland	United States	Moda Center	8,777 / 9,208	$837,408	Slydigs
19 May 2016	Oakland	United States	Oracle Arena	9,842 / 12,119	$1,055,206	Slydigs
22 May 2016	Anaheim	United States	Honda Center	7,971 / 9,017	$866,201	Slydigs
25 May 2016	Los Angeles	United States	Staples Center	10,882 / 11,951	$1,184,472	Slydigs
27 May 2016	San Diego	United States	Valley View Casino Center	9,709 / 9,876	$848,331	Slydigs
29 May 2016	Las Vegas	United States	The Colosseum at Caesars Palace	4,103 / 4,103	$1,092,885	N/A
TOTAL				267,907 / 286,163 (94%)	$26,531,986	

=== Cancellations and rescheduled shows ===
26 November 2014	Dublin, Ireland	3Arena	Postponed to 23 June 2015 due to unforeseen logistical difficulties.
17 & 18 December 2014	London, England	The O2 Arena	Postponed to 22 & 23 March 2015 due to Daltrey's illness
28 & 29 June 2015	Paris, France	Zénith de Paris	Cancelled in order for the band to appear at Glastonbury Festival.
