= Jon Button =

American bassist (born 1971)

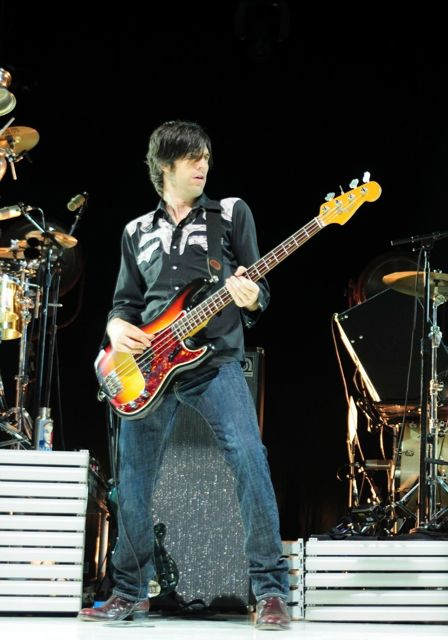

Background information
- Born: Jon Button; February 10, 1971 (age 54); Fairbanks, Alaska, United States
- Genres: Rock; jazz; blues
- Occupation: Musician
- Instruments: Bass; upright bass; guitar

Jon Button (born February 10, 1971) is an American bass player based in Los Angeles, California. Button has played on commercial, film and television scores and toured with a number of well-known artists. He plays both electric and upright string bass.

== Biography ==
Jon Button was born into a musical family in Fairbanks, Alaska. The youngest of five siblings, Button started learning piano at age four, and bass at seven. During his teen years, he played in jazz and blues bands and with local symphonies and orchestras. In high school, Button won music scholarships and later attended the University of North Texas' music program.

Button moved to Los Angeles in 1994 and found work playing on film and television scores, including the Emmy Award winning Batman Beyond. He has played on a number of recordings, including Borrowed Heaven by the Corrs and Tour Fijación Oral by Shakira. He has performed live and toured with such well-known artists as Michelle Branch, Rachael Yamagata, Mandy Moore, Shakira, Sheryl Crow, Roger Daltrey and The Who. Button also played at the musical benefit Live 8 and played upright bass with The Who during an acoustic concert associated with The Who's Super Bowl performance.

In 2009, Button toured as bassist in Roger Daltrey's band for the Use It or Lose It tour. The band also opened for Eric Clapton during several dates in 2010, and scheduled more tour dates for 2012. He is currently playing on tour with The Who to replace Pino Palladino.

Button has been married to actress Terryn Westbrook since 2011. They have one child.

== Discography ==
- Batman Beyond – Original Soundtrack (1999)
- Batman Beyond: Return of the Joker – Original Soundtrack (2000)
- Loud on Earth – Daniel Cage (2000)
- A Place to Land – Dakota Moon (2002)
- Identity Crisis – Shelby Lynne (2003)
- Chapter 2 – Jessica Jacobs (2003)
- Valhalla – Emily Richards (2003)
- Borrowed Heaven – The Corrs (2004)
- Como Me Acuerdo – Robi Draco Rosa (2004)
- Freedom – Kristy Frank (2006)
- Metta – Yogi (2006)
- Tour Fijación Oral – Shakira (2007)
- Talking To Me – Jeremy Kay (2007)
- Bonfires – Kirk Wheeler (2007)
- Earning Her Wings – Angela Easterling (2007)
- Soul on Ten – Robben Ford (2009)
- Life Is Not a Snapshot – Josh Wilson (2009)
- Electricidad – Jesse & Joy (2009)
- Soy – Ednita Nazario (2009)
- The Who's Tommy Orchestral – Roger Daltrey (2019)
- Lover & a Fighter – Devil Doll (2020)
- The Who with Orchestra Live at Wembley – The Who (2023)
