= Greatest Hits Live (The Who album) =

Live album by the Who
- Released: 19 January 2010 (iTunes Store); 23 March 2010 (Compact Disc)
- Recorded: 1965–2009
- Genre: Rock
- Length: 107:56
- Label: Geffen
- Producer: Bob Pridden

The Who chronology
Greatest Hits (2009)	Greatest Hits Live (2010)	Live at Hull 1970 (2012)

Greatest Hits Live is a compilation of live songs recorded by the English rock band the Who throughout their history. The album was released exclusively on the iTunes Store on 19 January 2010. This collection was released as a compact disc on 23 March 2010.

== Track listing ==
All songs written by Pete Townshend.

=== Disc one ===
1. "I Can't Explain" (San Francisco Civic Auditorium, San Francisco, 1971) – 2:32
2. "Substitute" (San Francisco Civic Auditorium, San Francisco, 1971) – 2:10
3. "Happy Jack" (City Hall, Hull, England, 1970) – 2:12
4. "I'm a Boy" (City Hall, Hull, England, 1970) – 2:42
5. "Behind Blue Eyes" (San Francisco Civic Auditorium, San Francisco, California, 1971) – 3:39
6. "Pinball Wizard" (Vetch Field, Swansea, Wales, 1976) – 2:48
7. "I'm Free" (Vetch Field, Swansea, Wales, 1976) – 1:44
8. "Squeeze Box" (Vetch Field, Swansea, Wales, 1976) – 2:51 (Previously released on 1996 The Who by Numbers reissue)
9. "Naked Eye/Let's See Action/My Generation Blues (Medley)" (Charlton Athletic Football Club, Charlton, South London, England, 1974) – 14:19
10. "5:15" (The Capital Centre, Largo, Maryland, 1973) – 5:53
11. "Won't Get Fooled Again" (The Capital Centre, Largo, Maryland 1973) – 8:38
12. "Magic Bus" (University of Leeds Refectory, University of Leeds, Leeds, West Yorkshire, England, 1970) – 7:33 (this version is the original Live at Leeds LP version, which features a section played backwards)
13. "My Generation" (Aeolian Hall, London, England, 1965) – 3:25 (Previously released on BBC Sessions)

=== Disc two ===
1. "I Can See for Miles" (Universal Amphitheatre, Los Angeles, 1989) – 3:45
2. "Join Together" (Universal Amphitheatre, Los Angeles, 1989) – 5:09
3. "Love, Reign o'er Me" (Universal Amphitheatre, Los Angeles, 1989) – 5:53
4. "Baba O'Riley" (Universal Amphitheatre, Los Angeles, 1989) – 5:16
5. "Who Are You" (Universal Amphitheatre, Los Angeles, 1989) – 6:22
6. "The Real Me" (Watford Civic Hall, Watford, England, 2002) – 6:44
7. "The Kids Are Alright" (Royal Albert Hall, London, England, 2002) – 4:03
8. "Eminence Front" (Brisbane Entertainment Centre, Brisbane, Australia, 2009) – 5:50
9. "A Man in a Purple Dress" (Nassau Coliseum, Uniondale, New York, 2007) – 4:28
