= Live at Hull 1970 =

Live at Hull

Live album by the Who
- Released: 6 November 2012
- Recorded: 15 February 1970
- Venue: Hull City Hall (Hull, England)
- Genre: Rock
- Length: 112:00
- Label: Geffen (US); Polydor (UK, Japan); Universal (Japan)

The Who chronology
Greatest Hits Live (2010)	Live at Hull (2012)	Quadrophenia – Live in London (2014)

Live at Hull 1970 is a live album by the English rock band the Who. Their performance at Hull City Hall on 15 February 1970 was recorded with the Pye Mobile Unit by Bob Pridden. In a few songs the bass guitar sound was either badly recorded or lost due to technical problems. For these songs, the bass guitar track from the previous night's Live at Leeds performance was matched to the Hull performance, allowing the show to be presented in full.

== Original setlist ==
Recorded at Hull City Hall on 15 February 1970 on Pye Mobile Unit.

No.	Title	Lead vocals	Length
1.	"Heaven and Hell"	John Entwistle
2.	"I Can't Explain"	Daltrey
3.	"Fortune Teller"	Daltrey, Entwistle
4.	"Tattoo"	Daltrey
5.	"Young Man Blues"	Daltrey
6.	"Substitute"	Daltrey
7.	"Happy Jack"	Daltrey
8.	"I'm a Boy"	Daltrey
9.	"A Quick One, While He's Away"	Daltrey, Entwistle, Townshend
10.	"Overture"	Instrumental
11.	"It's a Boy"	Townshend
12.	"1921"	Daltrey
13.	"Amazing Journey"	Daltrey
14.	"Sparks"	Instrumental
15.	"Eyesight to the Blind"	Daltrey
16.	"Christmas"	Daltrey, Townshend in middle eight
17.	"The Acid Queen"	Townshend
18.	"Pinball Wizard"	Daltrey
19.	"Do You Think It's Alright?"	Daltrey, Entwistle, Townshend
20.	"Fiddle About"	Entwistle
21.	"Tommy Can You Hear Me?"	Daltrey, Entwistle, Townshend
22.	"There's a Doctor"	Daltrey, Entwistle, Townshend
23.	"Go to the Mirror!"	Daltrey
24.	"Smash The Mirror"	Daltrey
25.	"Miracle Cure"	Daltrey, Entwistle, Townshend
26.	"Sally Simpson"	Daltrey
27.	"I'm Free"	Daltrey
28.	"Tommy's Holiday Camp"	Townshend
29.	"We're Not Gonna Take It"	Daltrey
30.	"Summertime Blues"	Daltrey, Entwistle
31.	"Shakin' All Over"	Daltrey
32.	"My Generation"	Daltrey

== Track listing ==
All songs written and composed by Pete Townshend except where noted.

Disc one
No.	Title	Writer(s)	Length
1.	"Heaven and Hell"	John Entwistle	5:09
2.	"I Can't Explain"		2:26
3.	"Fortune Teller"	Naomi Neville	3:22
4.	"Tattoo"		3:00
5.	"Young Man Blues"	Mose Allison	5:56
6.	"Substitute"		3:04
7.	"Happy Jack"		2:13
8.	"I'm a Boy"		2:45
9.	"A Quick One, While He's Away"		8:51
10.	"Summertime Blues"	Jerry Capehart, Eddie Cochran	3:34
11.	"Shakin' All Over"	Johnny Kidd	4:34
12.	"My Generation"		15:24

Disc two: Tommy
No.	Title	Writer(s)	Length
1.	"Overture"		6:53
2.	"It's a Boy"		0:31
3.	"1921"		2:26
4.	"Amazing Journey"		3:18
5.	"Sparks"		4:23
6.	"Eyesight to the Blind"	Sonny Boy Williamson II	1:58
7.	"Christmas"		3:19
8.	"The Acid Queen"		3:35
9.	"Pinball Wizard"		2:25
10.	"Do You Think It's Alright?"		0:22
11.	"Fiddle About"	John Entwistle	1:13
12.	"Tommy, Can You Hear Me?"		0:55
13.	"There's a Doctor"		0:23
14.	"Go to the Mirror!"		3:24
15.	"Smash The Mirror"		1:19
16.	"Miracle Cure"		0:13
17.	"Sally Simpson"		4:01
18.	"I'm Free"		2:39
19.	"Tommy's Holiday Camp"	Keith Moon	1:00
20.	"We're Not Gonna Take It"		8:48

== Personnel ==
The Who

- Roger Daltrey – lead vocals, harmonica, tambourine
- John Entwistle – bass guitar, vocals
- Keith Moon – drums, percussion, vocals
- Pete Townshend – lead guitar, vocals

Technical

- Producer and recorded by: Bob Pridden
- ProTools Engineer of bass guitar track from the previous night's Live at Leeds: Matt Hay

Design

- Sleeve design by Richard Evans
- Photography: Richard Evans and Chris McCourt

Notes

- 2012 issue of the concert originally released in 2010 as part of the Live at Leeds (40th Anniversary Ultimate Collectors' Edition) box set.
- Original recording produced by the Who at Hull City Hall on 15 February 1970. Recorded on the Pye Mobile.
