= Scott Devours =

American drummer and songwriter

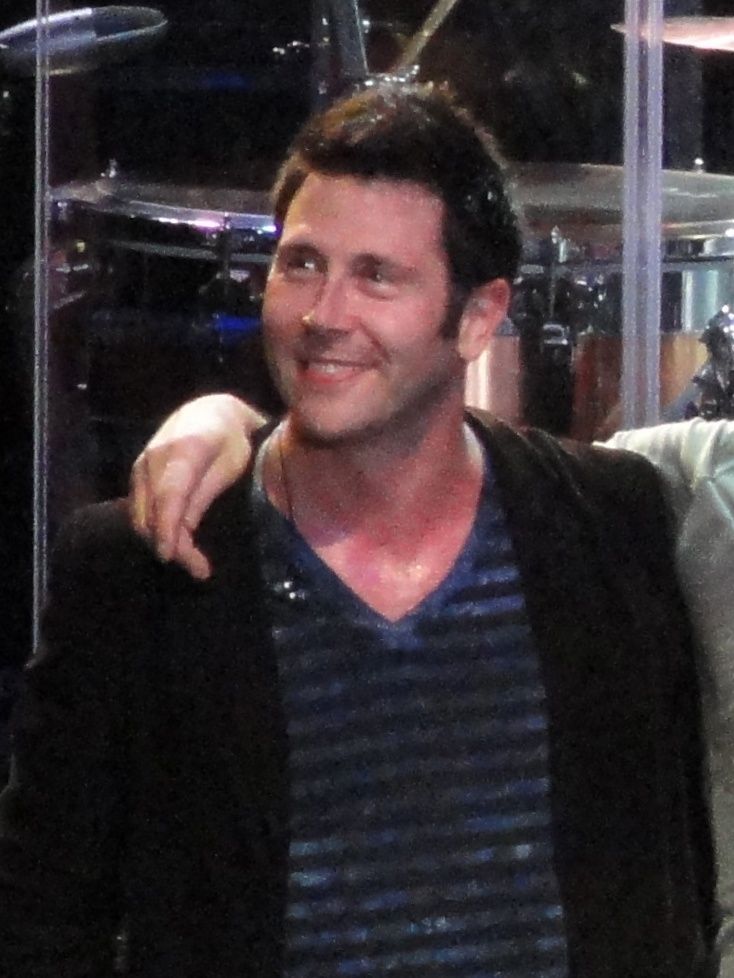
- Devours with Roger Daltrey in 2011

Background information
- Born: Scott Devours; December 15, 1966 (age 59); United States
- Genres: Rock; post-grunge
- Occupations: Musician; songwriter
- Instrument: Drums
- Formerly of: Oleander; IMA Robot; Speaker; Shave

Scott Devours (born December 15, 1966) is an American drummer and songwriter based in New York City. Devours has played drums for the post-grunge bands Oleander, IMA Robot and Long Beach bands like Speaker and Shave, worked on over thirty albums and toured with a number of well-known artists, including the Who.

== Biography ==
Scott Devours was born December 15, 1966, the son of Hurshel and Joyce Devours and a 3rd great nephew of opera singer Adelina Patti. He graduated from Middletown High School, Middletown, Maryland, in 1985, and lives in New York. He started drumming as a child and began a professional touring career as soon as he graduated from high school.

== Music career ==
In the early 2000's, Devours was tapped to play drums for Oleander, a post-grunge band from Sacramento, California. After Devours joined Oleander, the line up was considered stronger, and provided a Top 40 hit. The band released their second official album Unwind in 2001 and the track "Champion" reached the Top 40.

In November 2003, Devours left Oleander to work with the band IMA Robot, an Indie/Punk/Dance band based in Los Angeles that formed in the late nineties. On September 12, 2006, IMA Robot released their second album Monument to the Masses with Devours on drums which featured the singles "Creeps Me Out" and "Lovers in Captivity". In 2007 the band left Virgin Records and continued work as an unsigned band under the management of Echo Park Records.

Scott Devours has recorded, performed, and toured with a number of well-known artists, including Roger Daltrey, Honey Honey, speaker, TVM, Scott Ambush, Rocco Deluca and CPO. He also toured as an opening act for the White Stripes, 311, Jane's Addiction, Junior Senior, Duran Duran, Fishbone, Beastie Boys, Stone Temple Pilots, Fuel, Three Doors Down, Creed, Hoobastank, Live, Candlebox, The Wailers and The Von Bondies.

In 2009, Devours toured with The Who's Roger Daltrey on the "Use It Or Lose It Tour." The same band, Daltrey's No Plan B, also joined the Eric Clapton tour for several dates in 2010 and played The Who's Tommy at the Royal Albert Hall on March 24, 2011, as part of the Teenage Cancer Trust benefit concerts. Later in the year, the band presented Tommy on a tour of the UK, the US and Canada. Additional dates in Europe, Australia and Japan were scheduled for 2012. On February 5, 2013, Who touring drummer Zak Starkey was unable to play due to a tendon problem, and Devours filled in for the complete "Quadrophenia and More" concert in San Diego, CA. Devours would go on to replace Starkey on other dates in February 2013, and would again substitute for Starkey during the band's June–July European tour.

On May 8, 2025, the Who announced The Song Is Over North American Farewell Tour, the band's last-ever run in the U.S. and Canada that is set for mid-August to late September 2025,. On May 18, Pete Townshend announced on Instagram that Devours would permanently replace Starkey for the final tour.

== Influences ==
Devours lists a number of drummers as influences, including Buddy Rich, Clem Burke, Phil Collins, Stewart Copeland, Andrew Parker, Bill Ward, Neil Peart, Justin Meldal-Johnsen, Keith Moon and John Bonham.

He lists songwriting influences as The Beatles, Radiohead, Beck, Jeff Buckley, Yes, XTC, Utopia, Stevie Wonder, The Smiths, The Shins, Seals & Crofts, Queen, Mutemath, The Pretenders, Peter Gabriel, No Means No, Elvis Costello, Black Sabbath, Bob Marley, Bob Dylan and the Beastie Boys.
