= Largo (Americana album) =

American musical project

Largo is an Americana music project and album produced by Rick Chertoff and Rob Hyman and released by Polygram in 1998. It was co-written by them with Eric Bazilian and David Forman. The title is taken from the second movement of Antonín Dvořák's New World Symphony, and the project is considered "loosely inspired" by the symphony. The album has several interpretations of Dvorak's piece, performed by musicians such as The Chieftains and Garth Hudson.

Members of the rock groups The Band (Levon Helm and Garth Hudson) and The Hooters (Rob Hyman and Eric Bazilian) were involved in the project, although not necessarily performing on the same tracks.

Songs include:

- "Freedom Ride", sung by Taj Mahal
- "Gimme a Stone", sung by Levon Helm and David Forman
- "White Man's Melody", sung by Cyndi Lauper
- "An Uncommon Love", sung by Joan Osborne with Carole King (and co-written by King)
- "Hand in Mine", sung by Rob Hyman and Joan Osborne
- "Disorient Express", sung by David Forman
- "Medallion" sung by Willie Nile

Although the album's commercial performance was unremarkable, there has been an attempt to create a stage performance of the music. Roger Daltrey has performed live versions of "Freedom Ride" and "Gimme a Stone" and publicly lauded the album, several of its performers, and encouraged audience members to seek out and purchase it.

Gimme a Stone was also covered by Little Feat on their 2000 album Chinese Work Songs with a guest appearance from Bela Fleck on banjo. It was notable for being the only occasion when their original drummer Richie Hayward sang the lead vocal.
