= Love, Reign o'er Me =

1973 song by the Who

Single by the Who

from the album Quadrophenia
- B-side: "Water"(US/Canada) "Is It in My Head?" (Holland)
- Released: 27 October 1973
- Recorded: May 1972
- Studio: Olympic, London; additional tracks recorded on 8 June 1973 at "The Kitchen"
- Genre: Progressive rock; hard rock; arena rock
- Length: 5:48 (album version); 3:07 (single edit)
- Label: Track/MCA
- Songwriter: Pete Townshend
- Producers: Glyn Johns; The Who

The Who singles chronology
"5:15" (1973)	"Love, Reign o'er Me" (1973)	"The Real Me" (1974)

"Love, Reign o'er Me", subtitled "Pete's Theme", is a song by the English rock band the Who. Written and composed by guitarist Pete Townshend, it was released on 27 October 1973 as the second single from the band's sixth studio album and second rock opera, Quadrophenia. It is the final song on the album, and has been a concert staple for years. The song peaked at number 76 on the US Billboard Hot 100 and number 54 on Cash Box.

== Origin and recording ==
"Love, Reign o'er Me," along with "Is It in My Head?" (also from Quadrophenia), date back to 1972. Both songs were originally intended to be part of the unreleased autobiographical album, Rock Is Dead—Long Live Rock! This later evolved into Quadrophenia.

Townshend sang gently on the demo recording, creating a tender love song. Daltrey decided to turn the song into bombast, "That last high note, the scream, it's not on the demo...I sang it as passionate. To me, it was an orgasm." Townshend noted that Daltrey is "a great dramaturg".

== Lyrics ==
"Love, Reign o'er Me" concerns the main character of Quadrophenia, Jimmy, having a personal crisis. With nothing left to live for, he finds a spiritual redemption in pouring rain. As Townshend described the song:

[It] refers to Meher Baba's one time comment that rain was a blessing from God; that thunder was God's Voice. It's another plea to drown, only this time in the rain. Jimmy goes through a suicide crisis. He surrenders to the inevitable, and you know, you know, when it's over and he goes back to town he'll be going through the same shit, being in the same terrible family situation and so on, but he's moved up a level. He's weak still, but there's a strength in that weakness. He's in danger of maturing.

== Release and reception ==
"Love, Reign o'er Me" was released as a 7" single in the US, with "Water" as the B-side. The single version is shorter than the album track, is missing the introductory rain sounds and the first piano intro and timpani and gong crash, has a slightly different sequence of the lyrics, and ends on string synthesizers with piano rather than the drum solo, guitar, gong and brass explosion as on the album. The single peaked at number 76 on the US Billboard Hot 100. It was also released in Belgium and the Netherlands. Billboard praised Roger Daltrey's vocal performance, the "dynamic orchestral arrangements" and the "interesting" synthesizer use.

Roger Daltrey's vocal on the track has been widely praised; Mark Deming of AllMusic noted that "Quadrophenia captured him at the very peak of his powers, and 'Love, Reign o'er Me' is one moment where his golden-haired rock-god persona truly works and gives this song all the force it truly deserves."

Cash Box said that "powerhouse performance from Peter Townshend and the gang, coupled with super lyrics and production make this one the closest thing to an 'automatic hit' yet."

In 2012, Paste ranked the song number one on their list of the 20 greatest songs by the Who, and in 2022, Rolling Stone ranked the song number five on their list of the 50 greatest songs by the Who.

The song was also featured in the 1979 film based on the Quadrophenia album as well as the soundtrack album. The version included on the soundtrack features an added flute and string arrangement, and the ending is a few seconds shorter than the album version. The rain sounds have also been removed.

The song served as inspiration for the title of the 2007 film Reign Over Me, and it was also featured extensively throughout the film.

== Live performances ==
"Love, Reign o'er Me" was first performed live on the Who's Quadrophenia tour in 1973 and 1974, but it was dropped after the tour. It was returned to the band's setlist for the 1982 farewell tour of North America. The band performed it again at its one-off performance at Bob Geldof's Live Aid concert at Wembley Stadium in London, England on 13 July 1985 and it remained in the act for their 1989 reunion tour. When the Who performed Quadrophenia in its entirety in the summer of 1996, the band was joined by Pink Floyd guitarist David Gilmour. At the Who's 1 July 2002 concert at the Hollywood Bowl in Los Angeles, California, the first after the death of bassist John Entwistle, it was brought back and performed on their Quadrophenia and More tour, The Who Hits 50! tour, and the Moving On! Tour. Live performances of "Love, Reign o'er Me" can be found on the live albums Who's Last, Greatest Hits Live, Join Together, Live from Toronto, Quadrophenia Live in London, Live at the Isle of Wight Festival 2004, and The Who Live in Hyde Park.

== Personnel ==
- Roger Daltrey – lead vocals
- Pete Townshend – guitar, keyboards
- John Entwistle – bass guitar, French horn
- Keith Moon – drums, percussion

== Track listing ==
All songs written by Pete Townshend.

7" Vinyl (US)

1. "Love, Reign o'er Me" – 3:07
2. "Water" – 4:39

7" Vinyl (Belgium and the Netherlands)

1. "Love, Reign o'er Me" – 3:07
2. "Is It in My Head?" – 3:46

== Chart positions ==
Chart (1973)	Position
US Billboard Hot 100	76
Canada RPM Magazine RPM	31

== Pearl Jam version ==
"Love, Reign O'er Me"

Single by Pearl Jam
- Released: 23 February 2007
- Recorded: 2006
- Studio: Studio X, Seattle, Washington; Southern Tracks, Atlanta, Georgia; Doppler, Atlanta, Georgia
- Length: 5:34
- Label: Monkey Wrench
- Songwriter: Pete Townshend
- Producers: Brendan O'Brien, Pearl Jam

Pearl Jam singles chronology
"Gone" (2006)	"Love, Reign O'er Me" (2007)	"The Fixer" (2009)

The American rock band Pearl Jam released a cover of "Love, Reign o'er Me" for the 2007 film Reign Over Me, which took its name from the Who's song. Pearl Jam's version is played over the film's end credits, while the Who's version is heard twice in the movie.

=== Origin and recording ===
Actor Adam Sandler (who portrays Charlie Fineman in the film) approached vocalist Eddie Vedder after a 2006 Pearl Jam concert in Los Angeles, California about covering "Love, Reign o'er Me" for the film. Vedder was reluctant at first; however, he agreed to do the cover only after talking to Daltrey, who called Vedder and gave his approval. Guitarist Mike McCready said, "I knew he'd put everything into it, because he'd know Pete Townshend might someday listen to it."

=== Release and reception ===
The cover of "Love, Reign o'er Me" made a world premiere on the KISW radio station on 8 January 2007. The track appears on Pearl Jam's 2006 fan club Christmas single along with a cover of Neil Young's "Rockin' in the Free World" featuring Bono and the Edge from U2. The cover was also made available commercially as a single download from iTunes on 23 February 2007. Pearl Jam's version of the song was ranked number 4 in Rolling Stone's list of The 10 Best Covers of the Past Decade. It also peaked at number 32 on the Billboard Mainstream Rock Tracks chart.

=== Live performances ===
Pearl Jam first performed its cover of "Love, Reign o'er Me" live at the band's 26 June 2007 concert in Copenhagen, Denmark at the Forum. It was one of two songs the band performed for VH1 Rock Honors: The Who in July 2008. Live performances by Pearl Jam of "Love, Reign o'er Me" can be found on various official bootlegs.

=== Chart positions ===
Chart (2007)	Peak position
US Billboard Mainstream Rock	32
