= Join Together (album) =

Live album by the Who
- Released: March 1990
- Recorded: 27 June – 24 August, US Tour 1989
- Genre: Rock
- Length: 132:33
- Label: Virgin
- Producer: Bob Clearmountain; Clive Franks; Billy Nicholls

The Who chronology
Won't Get Fooled Again EP (1988)	Join Together (1990)	Thirty Years of Maximum R&B (1994)

Join Together is a box set of live material released from the Who's 1989 25th Anniversary Tour. Several of the tracks were recorded at Radio City Music Hall, New York, and at Universal Amphitheatre, Los Angeles, with the rest from various other concerts during the tour.

The live rendition of Tommy (1969) was compiled from two charity shows, on 27 June at New York City's Radio City Music Hall and on 24 August at the Universal Amphitheatre in Los Angeles. Songs from disc two originated from 6 concerts (verified by comparison with audience recordings from the tour).

It was released in 1990 by Virgin Records in the UK and MCA Records in the US. The album was released in the US as a vinyl three LP set in March 1990, where it reached #180 in the US charts. It was also released on cassette tape, and later released on MCA as a two-CD set. The box set included a full colour booklet including credits and pictures from the tour, and was dedicated to Keith Moon.

Professional ratings
Review scores
Source	Rating
AllMusic	1.5/5 stars
The Encyclopedia of Popular Music	3/5 stars
MusicHound	1/5
The Rolling Stone Album Guide	1/5 stars

== Track listing ==
All songs written by Pete Townshend except where noted.

Disc one
No.	Title	Writer(s)	Recording date	Length
1.	"Overture/It's a Boy"		24 August 1989, Universal Amphitheatre, Los Angeles, California	5:26
2.	"1921"		24 August 1989, Universal Amphitheatre, Los Angeles, California	2:52
3.	"Amazing Journey"		24 August 1989, Universal Amphitheatre, Los Angeles, California	3:07
4.	"Sparks"		24 August 1989, Universal Amphitheatre, Los Angeles, California	4:36
5.	"Eyesight to the Blind (The Hawker)"	Sonny Boy Williamson II	27 June 1989, Radio City Music Hall, New York City, New York	2:18
6.	"Christmas"		24 August 1989, Universal Amphitheatre, Los Angeles, California	4:25
7.	"Cousin Kevin"	John Entwistle	27 June 1989, Radio City Music Hall, New York City, New York	3:56
8.	"The Acid Queen"		27 June 1989, Radio City Music Hall, New York City, New York	3:44
9.	"Pinball Wizard"		27 June 1989, Radio City Music Hall, New York City, New York	4:21
10.	"Do You Think It's Alright?"		27 June 1989, Radio City Music Hall, New York City, New York	0:23
11.	"Fiddle About"	John Entwistle	27 June 1989, Radio City Music Hall, New York City, New York	1:39
12.	"There's a Doctor"		24 August 1989, Universal Amphitheatre, Los Angeles, California	0:21
13.	"Go to the Mirror!"		24 August 1989, Universal Amphitheatre, Los Angeles, California	3:22
14.	"Smash the Mirror"		24 August 1989, Universal Amphitheatre, Los Angeles, California	1:09
15.	"Tommy Can You Hear Me?"		24 August 1989, Universal Amphitheatre, Los Angeles, California	0:58
16.	"I'm Free"		24 August 1989, Universal Amphitheatre, Los Angeles, California	2:09
17.	"Miracle Cure"		24 August 1989, Universal Amphitheatre, Los Angeles, California	0:25
18.	"Sally Simpson"		24 August 1989, Universal Amphitheatre, Los Angeles, California	4:18
19.	"Sensation"		24 August 1989, Universal Amphitheatre, Los Angeles, California	2:22
20.	"Tommy's Holiday Camp"		27 June 1989, Radio City Music Hall, New York City, New York	0:58
21.	"We're Not Gonna Take It"		24 August 1989, Universal Amphitheatre, Los Angeles, California	8:44

Disc two
No.	Title	Writer(s)	Recording date	Length
1.	"Eminence Front"		27 July 1989, Carter–Finley Stadium, Raleigh, North Carolina	5:53
2.	"Face the Face"		22 August 1989, Jack Murphy Stadium, San Diego, California	6:15
3.	"Dig"		24 August 1989, Universal Amphitheatre, Los Angeles, California	3:46
4.	"I Can See for Miles"		24 August 1989, Universal Amphitheatre, Los Angeles, California	3:43
5.	"A Little Is Enough"		25 July 1989, Pontiac Silverdome, Pontiac, Michigan	5:06
6.	"5:15"		27 July 1989, Carter–Finley Stadium, Raleigh, North Carolina	5:48
7.	"Love, Reign o'er Me"		24 August 1989, Universal Amphitheatre, Los Angeles, California	6:49
8.	"Trick of the Light"	John Entwistle	19 August 1989, BC Place, Vancouver, Canada	4:49
9.	"Rough Boys"		29 July 1989, Tampa Stadium, Tampa, Florida	4:44
10.	"Join Together"		22 August 1989, Jack Murphy Stadium, San Diego, California	5:15
11.	"You Better You Bet"		22 August 1989, Jack Murphy Stadium, San Diego, California	5:40
12.	"Behind Blue Eyes"		24 August 1989, Universal Amphitheatre, Los Angeles, California	3:38
13.	"Won't Get Fooled Again"		25 July 1989, Pontiac Silverdome, Pontiac, Michigan	9:30

== Personnel ==
The Who

- Roger Daltrey – lead vocals, tambourine, harmonica, acoustic guitar, rhythm guitar
- Pete Townshend – lead guitar, acoustic guitar, rhythm guitar, lead and backing vocals
- John Entwistle – bass, backing and lead vocals

Additional musicians

- Simon Phillips – drums
- Steve "Boltz" Bolton – rhythm and lead guitar
- John Bundrick – keyboards
- Billy Nicholls – backing vocals, musical director
- Cleveland Watkiss – backing vocals
- Chyna Gordon – backing vocals
- Jody Linscott – percussion
- Simon Clarke – brass
- Simon Gardner – brass
- Roddy Lorimer – brass
- Tim Saunders – brass
- Neil Sidwell – brass

Design

- Cover design by Richard Evans
- Photography by Chalkie Davies and Carol Starr

== Charts ==
Chart (1990)	Peak position
UK Albums (OCC)	59
US Billboard 200	188
