= Reggie Grisham =

American horn player

- Genres: Classical, Popular music
- Instrument(s): Horn, trumpet

Reggie Grisham (born in Nashville, Tennessee) is an American horn player.

He completed a bachelor's degree in music education at Middle Tennessee State University and a master's degree in music performance at the University of Southern California. After completing his education, Grisham settled in the Los Angeles area. He has worked as a professional horn player for classical and popular music since 1998, playing in both ensembles and as a soloist.

Grisham has worked with artists including Kelly Clarkson, Marc Broussard, Mandisa, Casting Crowns, Michael English, Natalie Grant, and Denver and the Mile High Orchestra. In 2012–13, he toured with The Who on the Quadrophenia and More tour.
