= Frank Simes =

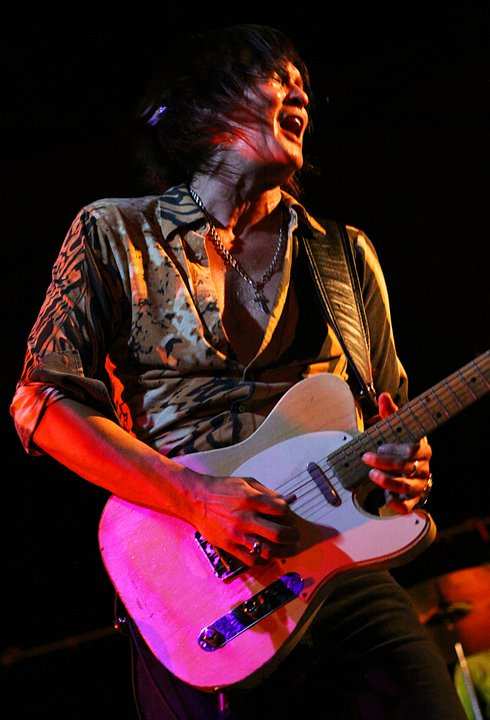
- Frank Simes

Background information
- Born: Tokyo, Japan
- Genres: Rock; rock and roll; psychedelic rock; blues; blues rock; art rock; progressive; classical; romantic; baroque; 20th century music
- Occupations: Composer; guitarist; singer; songwriter; musician; musical director; record producer; arranger
- Instruments: Guitar; vocals; bass guitar; keyboards; percussion; upright bass; ukulele
- Years active: 1970–present
- Labels: RCA Victor; Sony; Warner Bros.; Epic; Geffen
- Website: franksimes.com

Frank Turner Simes is an American musician, singer, guitarist, songwriter, composer and record producer. Simes has recorded and performed with Mick Jagger, Don Henley, and Stevie Nicks.

== Early life ==
Born in Tokyo as a US citizen, Frank Simes began studying guitar at the age of ten. The second and younger son of Stephen Hardy Simes, legal attaché to General Douglas MacArthur and judge advocate at US Army Japan, and Japanese model and restaurateur, Sachiko Nakamura. His early interests also included close-up magic and fine arts, which remain lifelong passions. His professional career began at 14 when his band, Sunrise, which he formed with Mickie Yoshino and Steve Fox, later of Godiego released a record on RCA Victor. The following year he moved to Los Angeles to study music at Fairfax High School. When Simes was 16 he began attending college as a music major. At 20, his band, the Whizz Kidds, was signed by Highland/A&M Records, and Frank's song, "Sweet Honey", their debut single, received national airplay.

== Music career ==
Simes continued his music career, working with Martha Davis of The Motels as a songwriter, producer, and guitarist for three years in the mid-1980s. In 1989, he began touring with Don Henley as a guitarist, and vocalist and soon after as a songwriter when Simes co-wrote "Workin' It" and "Goodbye to a River". Simes was featured on the Inside Job DVD and continues to work with Henley today.

Simes toured and recorded with Mick Jagger on his Wandering Spirit album and tour, was the band leader for Don Henley on the Inside Job tour, and played guitar and sang for Stevie Nicks on the Enchanted tour. During the next two decades, Simes also worked with Rod Stewart, Don Felder, Charlotte Church, Sylvie Vartan, Engelbert Humperdinck, David Lee Roth, Warren Zevon and Roger Waters. Simes played on Roger Daltrey's album Moonlighting and appeared in The Who's documentary Amazing Journey. Simes was named musical director for Roger Daltrey's band No Plan B.

Since 1993, Simes has composed over 1,400 pieces of music for such companies as Paramount Television and Los Angeles Post Music. Simes has also composed original guitar and piano pieces in the Modern, Baroque, and Romantic styles, some of which were recorded by the London Philharmonic Orchestra.

Simes produced several albums for major labels such as Sony Music Entertainment, RCA Records, Epic Records and Mitsubishi. Frank Simes is the recipient of nine platinum records with such artist as Don Henley, Rod Stewart and various soundtrack albums. His credits include producing three albums on Sony, recording with Rod Stewart on his album entitled, As Time Goes By: the Great American Songbook, Volume II, performing on Roger Daltrey's Moonlighting anthology CD and DVD, and Daltrey's Gold CD, as well as on Engelbert Humperdinck's The Winding Road album and Greatest Hits and More. Simes also recorded with Art Garfunkel on Some Enchanted Evening, Mylène Farmer on her Innamoramento album, and with Sylvie Vartan on her album Nouvelle Vague. He has produced five albums for vocalist Ann Lewis.

Simes composed and recorded a musical entitled The Door with partner Lisa Verlo. Together they formed Soundlove Productions, collaborating on a children's CD, Turner's Treehouse, as well as music for TV and film.

In 2009, Simes toured as lead guitarist and musical director in Roger Daltrey's No Plan B band for the Use It or Lose It tour. The band also opened for Eric Clapton on two tours in 2010. In 2011, continuing as musical director and lead guitarist for Roger Daltrey, Simes performed the rock opera Tommy and other songs at a warm-up show in Bournemouth at the O2 Academy in preparation for a show at the Royal Albert Hall to benefit Teenage Cancer Trust. Simes performed alongside Pete Townshend who played and sang as a guest at the TCT show. In July 2011, Roger Daltrey and band toured England, Scotland, Ireland, Belgium, and Denmark, performing the legendary rock opera Tommy, The Who classics, and Roger's solo works. Roger and band also toured in the US and Canada beginning September 2011. Additional dates in Europe, Australia and Japan were booked for 2012.

On 18 July 2012, The Who announced Simes as musical director and on keyboards/backing vocals for a 35-date tour where they played their album Quadrophenia in its entirety.

In November 2014, The Who started their 50th-anniversary world tour, The Who Hits 50! with Simes as musical director and playing keyboards, mandolin, banjo, percussion, and backing vocals.

== Awards ==
- Double Grammy nominee with Don Henley – 2000
- Platinum Album, Inside Job CD – Don Henley, Warner Bros.
- Platinum Album, Inside Job DVD – Don Henley, Warner Bros.
- Platinum Album, Actual Miles – Don Henley, Geffen
- Platinum Album, As Time Goes By: the Great American Songbook, Volume II – Rod Stewart, Jay Records
- Platinum Album, Your Filthy Little Mouth CD – David Lee Roth, Warner Bros.
- Platinum Album, Wandering Spirit – Mick Jagger, Atlantic
- Platinum Album, Leap of Faith Soundtrack – Don Henley
- Platinum Album, Tell Me The Truth – Timothy B. Schmit, MCA
- Platinum Album, Michael Soundtrack – Various Artists, Revolution
- Platinum Album, Kermit Unpigged – The Muppets Jim Henson
- Platinum Album, SoloSolo – Puffy, Epic/Sony

== Songs ==
- "Pink Christmas", Pink Christmas, Victor – 2007
- "Battlefield", Rebirth, Ann Lewis, Sony Jpn – 2006
- "Truth or Lies", Rebirth, Ann Lewis, Sony Jpn– 2006
- "Garasu no Tenshi" ["The Prince of Glass"], Rebirth, Ann Lewis, Sony Jpn– 2006
- "Helpless Abuse", Me, Myself, Ann I, Ann Lewis, Mitsubishi – 2004
- "Loneliness", Me, Myself, Ann I, Ann Lewis, Mitsubishi – 2004
- "Jinsei Wa Jeopardy" ["Life is Jeopardy"], Me, Myself, and I, Ann Lewis, Mitsubishi – 2004
- "Sakura and Rose" ["Cherry Blossom and Rose"], Girls' Night Out, Ann Lewis, Sony Jpn – 2002
- "Genshi-Bakudan" ["Atom Bomb"], Girls' Night Out, Ann Lewis, Sony Jpn – 2002
- "Girls' Night Out", Girls' Night Out, Ann Lewis, Sony Jpn – 2002
- "Workin' It", Inside Job, Warner Bros. – co-wrote with Don Henley – 2000
- "Goodbye to a River", Inside Job, Warner Bros. – co-wrote with Don Henley – 2000
- "Opus 5 in B minor" – London Philharmonic Orchestra – 1999
- "Snacks", SoloSolo, Epic – Puffy
- "I Imagined You", Surreal McCoys, Sony Jpn – 1997
- "A Thousand Miles Away", Surreal McCoys, Sony – 1997
- "So Disappointed", Surreal McCoys, Sony – 1997
- "The One that Got Away", Surreal McCoys, Sony – 1997
- "Trip of No Return", Surreal McCoys, Sony – 1997
- "What Kind of Life", Surreal McCoys, Sony – 1997
- "No One", Surreal McCoys, Sony – 1997
- "Life's a Rocket", Surreal McCoys, Sony – 1997
- "Don't Be Late", Surreal McCoys, Sony – 1997
- "The One Sure Thing on Mars", Surreal McCoys, Sony – 1997
- "Everybody's Got the Monkey", David Lee Roth, Warner Bros. – 1995
- "Young Man", Slave to the Thrill, Hurricane, Enigma – 1988
- "Slave to the Thrill", Slave to the Thrill, Hurricane, Enigma – 1988
- "Get Your Hooks Off Me", The Whizz Kidds, LA Freeway, Compilation – 1979
- "Sweet Honey", The Whizz Kidds, A&M/Highland – 1977

== Recordings ==
- The Best of the British – Engelbert Humperdinck
- Sylvie Vertan – Sylvie Vertan
- Wandering Spirit – Mick Jagger, Atlantic
- As Time Goes By: the Great American Songbook, Volume II – Rod Stewart, Jay Records
- Girls In Black – Don Felder, Rocket Science
- "Don't Rock The Boat" – Don Henley, Leap of Faith Soundtrack
- Come Rain Come Shine – Don Henley, Warner Bros.
- It's Not Easy Being Green – Don Henley, BMG
- Some Enchanted Evening – Art Garfunkel
- Cruel Obsession – David Lee Roth, Atlantic
- Tell Me The Truth – Timothy B. Schmit, MCA
- Pink Christmas – Ann Lewis, Victor
- Bleu – Ann Lewis, Victor
- Boys Get Ready – Ann Lewis, Victor
- The Conqueror – Ann Lewis, Victor
- Girls Night Out – Ann Lewis, Victor
- Last Action Hero – Michael Kaman's Score
- SoloSolo – Puffy, Epic/Sony

== Musical director ==
- The Who – 2012 Olympics
- The Who – Quadrophenia tour, 2012–2013
- The Who – The Who Hits 50! tour, 2014–2016
- Keith Moon: The Real Me – musical, Mick Berry, 2015
- Roger Daltrey – Tommy tour, 2011
- Roger Daltrey – 2006 to present
- Don Felder – 2005 to present
- Don Henley – Inside Job, tour and video, 1999 to present
- Stevie Nicks – Enchanted tour, 1998
- Heartbeat of a Planet – TV show, 2013
- The Door – musical, 2012

== DVD and film ==
- "The Who Quadrophenia Live in London" – The Who
- "Inside Job" – Don Henley
- "The How" – Roger Daltrey
- "Amazing Journey: The Story of The Who" – interviewed in the documentary
- "VH1 Storytellers" – Don Henley
- "VH1 Storytellers" – Stevie Nicks
- "MTV Unplugged" – Don Henley

== Television appearances ==
- "The Tonight Show Starring Jimmy Fallon" – with The Who
- "The Ellen DeGeneres Show" – with Roger Daltrey
- "The Tonight Show with Jay Leno" – with Don Henley
- "The Conan O'Brien Show" – with Don Henley
- "Taking You Home" – music video with Don Henley
- "MTV Unplugged" Stevie Nicks
- "Storytellers", Stevie Nicks
- "Saturday Night Live" with Mick Jagger
- "Saturday Night Live" with Don Henley (1989)
- "Saturday Night Live" with Don Henley (2000)
- "Last Worthless Evening" – music video with Don Henley
- "Don't Tear Me Up" music video with Mick Jagger
- "Live In New York" with Mick Jagger
- "Late Night with David Letterman" with Don Henley
- "MTV Unplugged" with Don Henley
- "Stoytellers" with Don Henley
- "MTV Awards Presentation" with Don Henley
- "Rosie O'Donnell" with Stevie Nicks
- "Solid Gold" with Martha Davis
- "The Arsenio Hall Show" with Peter Cetera
- "Top Of The Pops" with Martha Davis

== TV and film composing ==
Simes is composer of over 1,200 musical pieces. His works have appeared in TV shows and films including:

- Cell, Stephen King, starring John Cusack
- The Sopranos, HBO
- Friends, NBC
- Sex and the City, HBO
- 20/20, ABC
- Mad About You, NBC
- Drew Carey Show, ABC
- King of the Hill, FOX
- Entertainment Tonight, Syndicated
- Nightline, ABC
- General Hospital, ABC
- One Life to Live, ABC
- Nash Bridges, CBS
- World News Now, ABC
- Primetime Live, ABC
- Jerry Springer, Syndicated
- Roseanne, ABC
- Hudson Street, ABC
- Beach Patrol, Local
- Hangin' With You, ABC
- Step By Step, ABC
- Maury Povich, NBC
- Wheel Of Fortune, Syndicated
- Good Morning America, ABC
- Saturday World News, ABC
- Extra, Syndicated
- Reboot, ABC
- Bugs Bunny and Tweetie Bird, ABC
- Buffy The Vampire Slayer, UPN
- Saved by the Bell, NBC
- TV's Funniest Families, NBC
- Mike And Maty, ABC
- Bad As I Wanna Be: The Dennis Rodman Story, USA
- Gordon Elliott Show, Syndicated
- Game Warden Wildlife Journal, DSC
- Martha Stewart Living, TLC
- Ripley's Believe It Or Not, TBS
- Professional Bowling, ABC
- What-A-Mess, ABC
- Rebecca's Garden, Local
- Caryl & Marilyn: Real Friends, ABC
- In Search Of History, A&E
- The Ricki Lake Show, Syndicated
- Bump in the Night, ABC
- In Person With Ma, NBC
- The Fresh Prince Of Bel-Air, NBC
- Jenny Jones
- Living Better With Carrie Wait
- Thursday Night Movie, ABC
- Good Morning America, ABC
- Shipmates
- Worst Witch
- Young Comedians
- The Tracey Ullman Show
- Rock 'n Roll High
- Paula Poundstone
- Extreme Comedy, ABC
- Winnie The Pooh, ABC
- Pee Wee Herman, NBC
- Ed, ABC
- Golf, The Memorial, ABC
- Speedway Survival
- Sniper School
- Name Your Adventure, NBC
- George Carlin, Promo

== TV commercials ==
- Colgate – 2015
- Honda – 2014
- Beneful – 2014
- Blue Cross – 2013
- Burger King – 2013
