= Teenage Cancer Trust =

UK cancer care and support charity

- Founded: 1990
- Type: Charity
- Registration no.: 1062559 (England & Wales); SC039757 (Scotland)
- Purpose: Teenage and young adult cancer patients
- Location: London, England
- Region served: United Kingdom
- Product: Cancer treatment centers and support in local areas, specialist cancer staff and education and advocacy programme
- Revenue: £13.5 million (2013)
- Website: teenagecancertrust.org

Teenage Cancer Trust is a cancer care and support charity in the UK that exists to improve the cancer experience of young people aged 13–24. Founded in 1990, the charity's key service is providing specialist teenage units in NHS hospitals. It also trains and funds staff who are teenage cancer specialists. The units are dedicated areas for teenage and young adult patients, who are involved in their concept and creation. Medical facilities on the units are equipped with computers, TVs and game consoles.

The charity also serves as an advocate for teenage cancer needs, promoting related research and national and international forums. It also provides support services and education related to teenage and young adult cancer.

== History ==
The charity was established in 1990 and grew from an idea by a group of young women to organise a fashion show to fund a children's intensive care heart unit at Guy's Hospital, London. To date, the charity has built 28 units in cities across the UK including places like London, Leeds, Liverpool, Birmingham, Manchester, Glasgow and Edinburgh.

== Administrative ==
The Teenage Cancer Trust was registered as a charity in the United Kingdom on 29 May 1997, and holds registration number 1062559 (England & Wales) and SC039757 (Scotland). Today the organisation operates from offices in West London, with an annual income of around £6½M a year.

Dr Adrian Whiteson OBE and Myrna Whiteson MBE, founded the Teenage Cancer Trust and hold the position of life presidents of the organisation. The Board of Trustees is made up of: Paul Spanswick (Chair), Carrie Hindmarsh, Jeremy Seigal, Jeremy Shute, Professor Rachael Hough, Rich Waterworth, Richard Rosenberg, Ronnie Harris, Sue Morgan MBE, Varda Shine and Vimi Grewal-Carr.

The honorary patrons of the charity are Princess Beatrice, Princess Eugenie, and Roger Daltrey of the Who.

== Stephen Sutton ==
In April 2014, Stephen Sutton, who was diagnosed with stage 3B colorectal cancer, raised the most money Teenage Cancer Trust had ever received from an individual fundraiser. Sutton died on 14 May 2014, but in September 2014, Teenage Cancer Trust announced how his fundraising total of £5 million campaign would be spent. It was revealed in the Queen's Birthday Honours in June 2014 that he had been awarded an MBE in recognition of his fundraising and services to Teenage Cancer Trust.

== See also ==
- Cancer in the United Kingdom
