= The Who =

English rock band

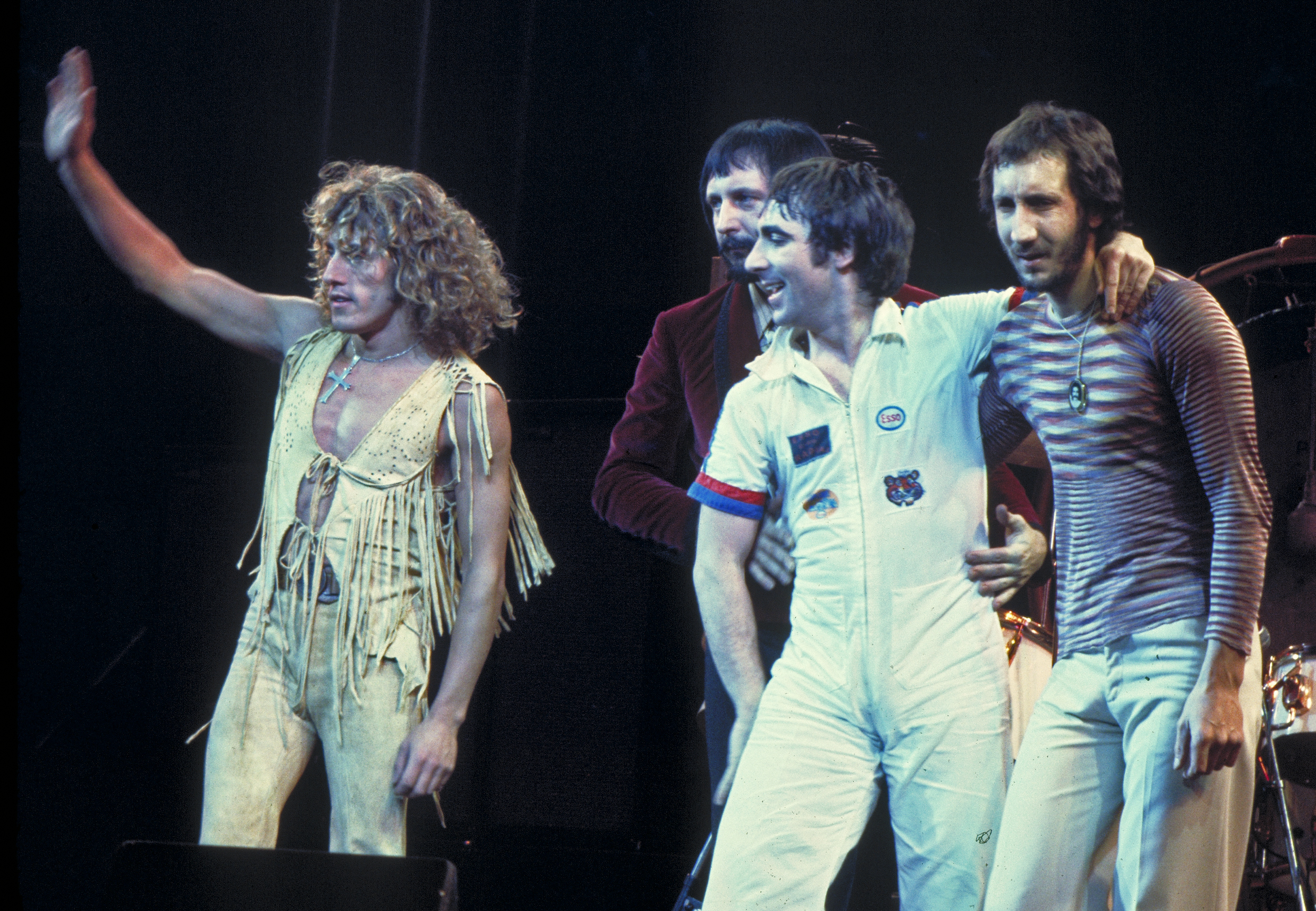
- The Who in 1975. From left to right: Roger Daltrey (vocals), John Entwistle (bass), Keith Moon (drums) and Pete Townshend (guitar).

Background information
- Also known as: The Detours (1961–64); The High Numbers (1964)
- Origin: London, England
- Genres: Rock; hard rock; power pop
- Works: Discography
- Years active: 1964–1983; 1985; 1988–1989; 1991; 1996–present
- Labels: Decca; Brunswick; Polydor; Reaction; Atco; Track; MCA; Warner Bros.; Virgin; Universal; Geffen
- Members: Roger Daltrey; Pete Townshend
- Past members: John Entwistle; Doug Sandom; Keith Moon; Kenney Jones
- Website: thewho.com

The Who are an English rock band formed in London in 1964. Their classic lineup (1964–1978) consisted of lead vocalist Roger Daltrey, guitarist Pete Townshend, bassist John Entwistle, and drummer Keith Moon. Considered one of the greatest rock bands of the 20th century, their contributions to rock music include the development of the Marshall stack, large public address systems, the use of synthesisers, Entwistle's and Moon's influential playing styles, Townshend's feedback and power chord guitar technique, and the invention of the rock opera. They are cited as an influence by many bands, particularly those in the hard rock, punk, power pop and mod genres. The Who were inducted into the Rock and Roll Hall of Fame in 1990.

The Who evolved from an earlier group, the Detours, and established themselves as part of the pop art and mod movements, featuring auto-destructive art by destroying instruments and pursuing the style of "Maximum R&B". Their first single, "I Can't Explain" (1964), reached the UK top ten, and was followed by a string of hit singles including "Anyway, Anyhow, Anywhere", "My Generation" (both 1965), "Substitute", "I'm a Boy", "Happy Jack" (all 1966) and "Pictures of Lily" (1967). In 1967, they performed at the Monterey Pop Festival and released The Who Sell Out, a parody of pirate radio. It produced "I Can See for Miles", their only US top ten single. The group's rock opera Tommy (1969) included the single "Pinball Wizard" and was a critical and commercial success.

Further festival appearances at Woodstock and the Isle of Wight, along with the live album Live at Leeds (1970), established their reputation as a respected rock act. The success put pressure on lead songwriter Townshend, and the follow-up to Tommy, Lifehouse, was abandoned. Songs from the project made up Who's Next (1971), including the hits "Baba O'Riley", "Behind Blue Eyes" and "Won't Get Fooled Again". The group released another rock opera, Quadrophenia (1973), as a celebration of their mod roots, and oversaw the film adaptation of Tommy (1975). Following the release of The Who by Numbers (1975), they continued to tour to large audiences. The release of Who Are You (1978) was overshadowed by Moon's death shortly after.

Former Small Faces and Faces drummer Kenney Jones replaced Moon, and the group resumed touring. In 1979, they released a film adaptation of Quadrophenia and the retrospective rockumentary The Kids Are Alright. The early 1980s brought two more albums, Face Dances (1981) and It's Hard (1982), and more successful world tours, though Townshend became weary of the group during this time, and they officially split in 1983. The Who occasionally re-formed for live appearances such as Live Aid in 1985, a 25th-anniversary tour in 1989 with Simon Phillips on drums, and a tour of Quadrophenia during 1996–1997 with Zak Starkey on drums. A full-time reunion began in 1999, with Starkey as drummer. After Entwistle's death in 2002, plans for a new album were delayed until 2006, when Endless Wire was released. The Who have continued to perform and tour officially as a duo of Daltrey and Townshend, augmented by various other musicians. Their twelfth album, Who ( 2019), was supported by additional touring. In 2025, the band conducted their final tour, entitled The Song Is Over North American Farewell Tour.

== History ==
=== Background ===
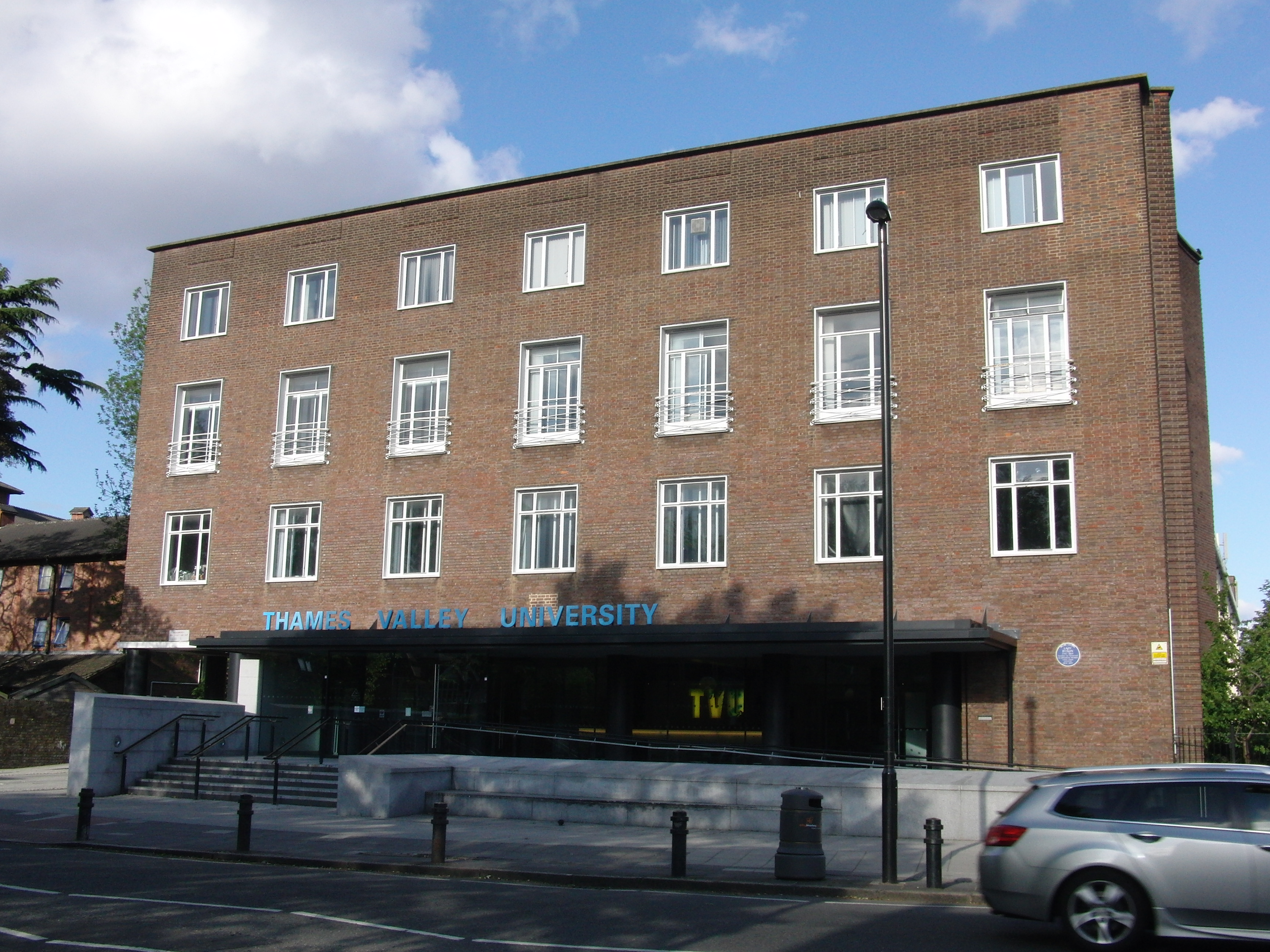
Pete Townshend attended Ealing Art College in west London (pictured in 2010), and his experience there contributed to the Who's career.

The founding members of the Who, Roger Daltrey, Pete Townshend and John Entwistle, grew up in Acton, London and attended Acton County Grammar School. Townshend's father, Cliff, played saxophone, and his mother, Betty, had sung in the entertainment division of the RAF during World War II, and both supported their son's interest in rock and roll. Townshend and Entwistle became friends in their second year of Acton County, and formed a trad jazz group; Entwistle also played French horn in the Middlesex Schools' Symphony Orchestra. Both were interested in rock, and Townshend particularly admired Cliff Richard's début single, "Move It". Entwistle moved to guitar, but struggled with it due to his large fingers, and moved to bass on hearing the guitar work of Duane Eddy. He couldn't afford a bass, so he built one at home. After Acton County, Townshend attended Ealing Art College, a move he later described as profoundly influential on the course of the Who.

Daltrey, who was in the year above, had moved to Acton from Shepherd's Bush, a more working-class area. He had trouble fitting in at the school, and discovered rock and roll. He was expelled at 15 and found work on a building site. In 1961, he started the Detours, which would evolve into the Who. The band played professional gigs, such as weddings and corporate functions, and Daltrey kept a close eye on the finances and the music.

Daltrey spotted Entwistle by chance on the street carrying a bass and recruited him into the Detours. The initial lineup was Daltrey on guitar, Entwistle on bass, Harry Wilson on drums, and Colin Dawson on vocals. The band played instrumentals by the Shadows and the Ventures, as well as a variety of pop and trad jazz covers. In 1962, Townshend was brought into the Detours at Entwistle's recommendation. Daltrey was considered the leader and, according to Townshend, "ran things the way he wanted them". Wilson was fired in mid-1962 and replaced by Doug Sandom, who was older than the rest of the band, married, and a more proficient musician, having been playing semi-professionally for two years.

Dawson left after frequently arguing with Daltrey and was briefly replaced by Gabby Connolly, before Daltrey moved to lead vocals. With Entwistle's encouragement, Townshend became the sole guitarist. Through Townshend's mother, the group obtained a management contract with local promoter Robert Druce, who started booking the band as a support act. The Detours were influenced by the bands they supported, including Screaming Lord Sutch, Cliff Bennett and the Rebel Rousers, Shane Fenton and the Fentones, and Johnny Kidd and the Pirates. The Detours were particularly interested in the Pirates because they also had only one guitarist, Mick Green, who inspired Townshend to combine rhythm and lead guitar in his style. Entwistle's bass became more of a lead instrument, playing melodies. In February 1964, the Detours became aware of the group Johnny Devlin and the Detours, and changed their name. Townshend and his housemate Richard Barnes spent a night considering names, focusing on a theme of joke announcements, including "No One" and "the Group". Townshend preferred "the Hair", and Barnes liked "the Who" because it "had a pop punch". Daltrey chose "the Who" the next morning.

=== 1964–1978 ===
==== Early career ====
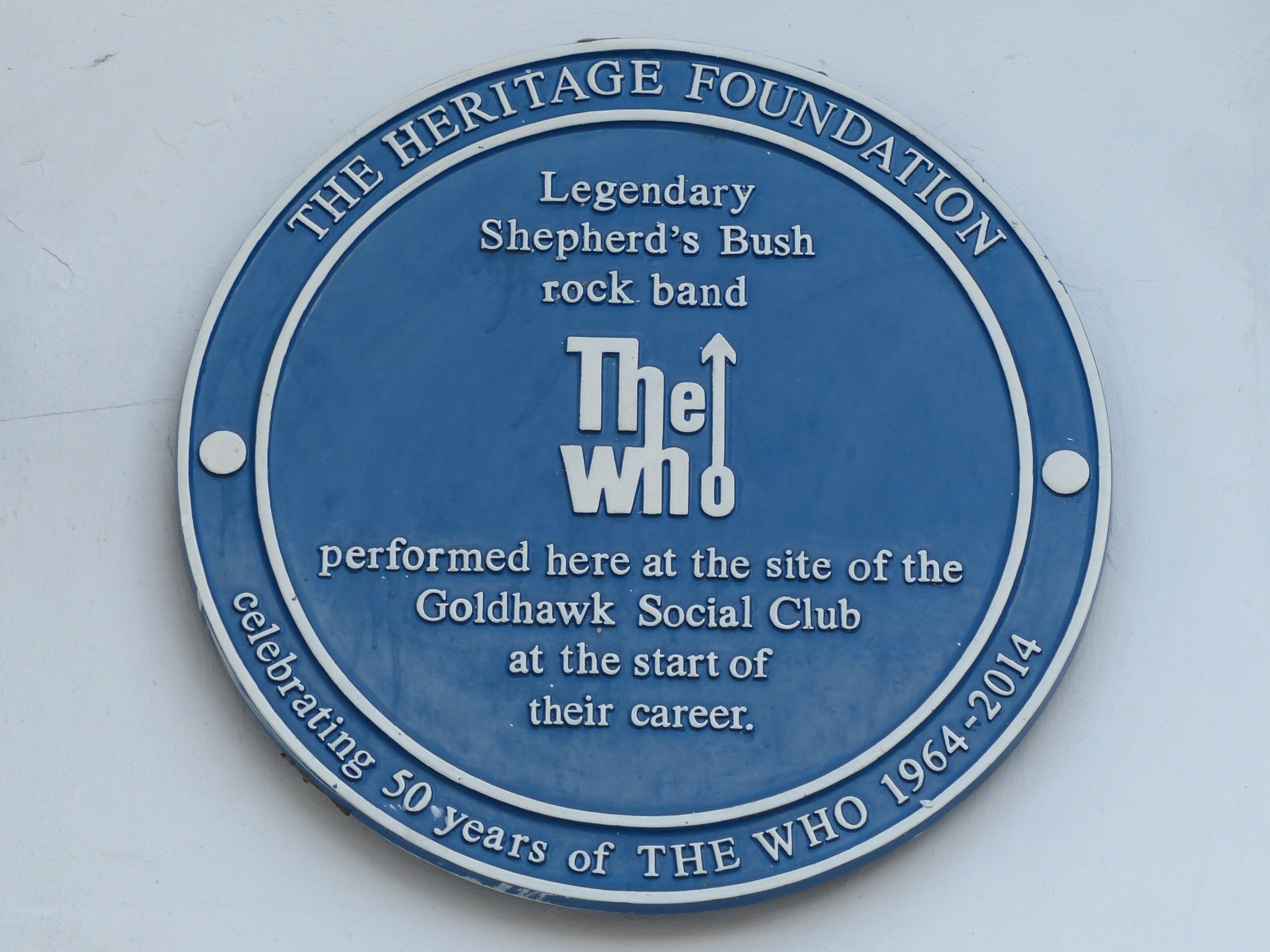
Plaque at the Goldhawk Social Club in Shepherd's Bush, London, marking early performances by the Who.

By the time the Detours had become the Who, they had already found regular gigs, including at the Oldfield Hotel in Greenford, the White Hart Hotel in Acton, the Goldhawk Social Club in Shepherd's Bush, and the Notre Dame Hall in Leicester Square. They had also replaced Druce as manager with Helmut Gorden, with whom they secured an audition with Chris Parmeinter for Fontana Records. Parmeinter found problems with the drumming and, according to Sandom, Townshend immediately turned on him and threatened to fire him if his playing did not immediately improve. Sandom left in disgust, but was persuaded to lend his kit to any potential stand-ins or replacements. Sandom and Townshend did not speak again for 14 years.

During a gig with a stand-in drummer in late April at the Oldfield, the band first met Keith Moon. Moon grew up in Wembley, and had been drumming in bands since 1961. He was performing with a semi-professional band called the Beachcombers, and wanted to play full-time. Moon played a few songs with the group, breaking a bass drum pedal and tearing a drum skin. The band were impressed with his energy and enthusiasm, and offered him the job. Moon performed with the Beachcombers a few more times, but dates clashed, and he chose to devote himself to the Who. The Beachcombers auditioned Sandom, but were unimpressed and did not ask him to join.

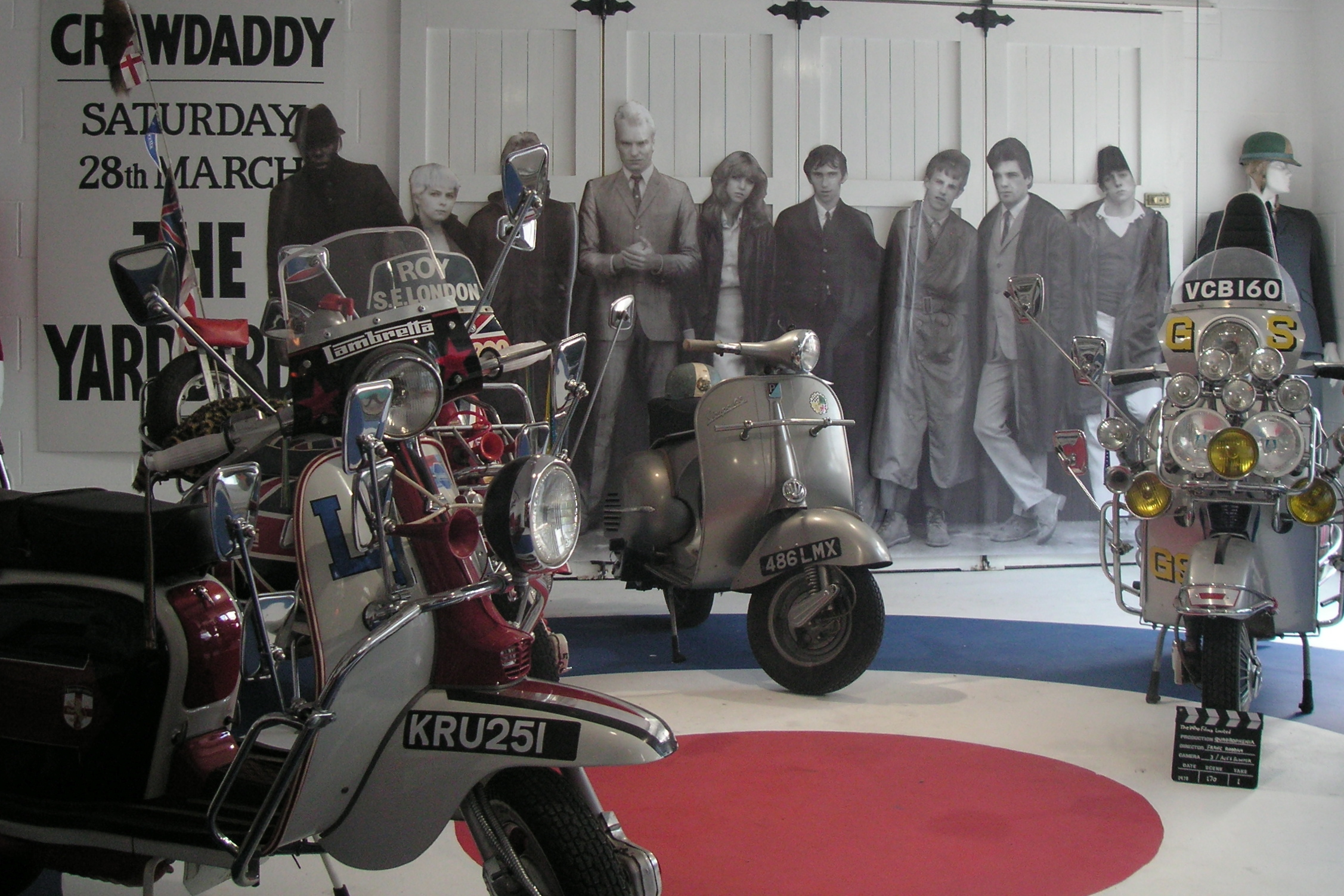
The Who's aesthetic grew out of mod subculture with its high fashion, scooters for transport, and shaggy hairstyles.

The Who changed managers to Peter Meaden. He decided that the group would be ideal to represent the growing mod movement in Britain, which involved fashion, scooters and rhythm and blues, soul and modern jazz. He renamed the group the High Numbers, dressed them up in mod clothes, secured a second, more favourable audition with Fontana and wrote the lyrics for both sides of their single "Zoot Suit"/"I'm the Face" to appeal to mods. The tune for "Zoot Suit" was "Misery" by the Dynamics, and "I'm the Face" borrowed from Slim Harpo's "I Got Love If You Want It". Although Meaden tried to promote the single, it failed to reach the top 50 and the band reverted to calling themselves the Who. The group – none of whom played their instruments conventionally – began to improve their stage image; Daltrey started using his microphone cable as a whip on stage, and occasionally leapt into the crowd; Moon threw drumsticks into the air mid-beat; Townshend mimed machine-gunning the crowd with his guitar while jumping on stage and playing guitar with a fast arm-windmilling motion, or stood with his arms aloft allowing his guitar to produce feedback in a posture dubbed "the Bird Man".

Two filmmakers, Kit Lambert and Chris Stamp, replaced Meaden as manager. They were looking for a young, unsigned rock group that they could make a film about, and had seen the band at the Railway Hotel in Wealdstone, which had become a regular venue for them. Lambert related to Townshend and his art school background, and encouraged him to write songs. In August, Lambert and Stamp made a promotional film featuring the group and their audience at the Railway. The band changed their set towards soul, rhythm and blues and Motown covers, and created the slogan "Maximum R&B".

In June 1964, during a performance at the Railway, Townshend accidentally broke the head of his guitar on the low ceiling of the stage. Angered by the audience's laughter, he smashed the instrument on the stage, then picked up another guitar and continued the show. The following week, the audience were keen to see a repeat of the event. Moon obliged by kicking his drum kit over, and auto-destructive art became a feature of the Who's live set.

==== First singles and My Generation ====
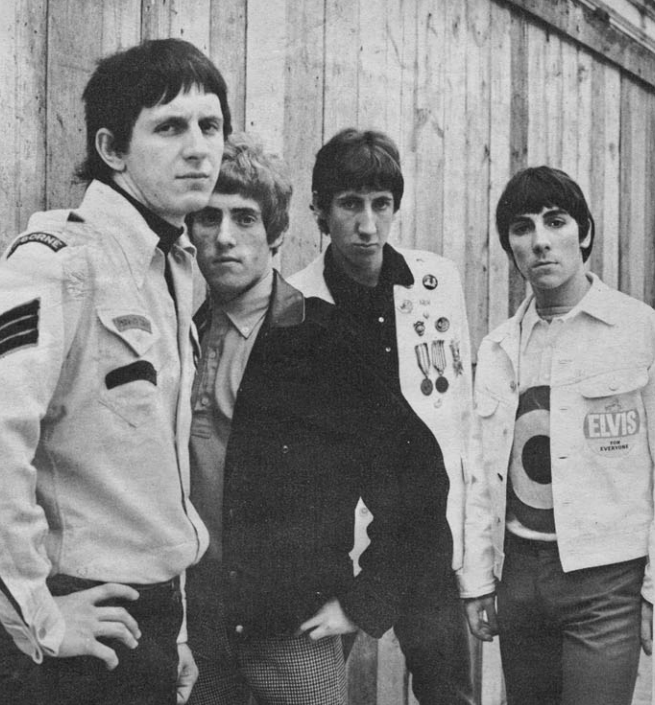
Promotional shot of the Who, 1965. From left: Entwistle, Daltrey, Townshend, Moon.

By late 1964, the Who were becoming popular in London's Marquee Club, and a rave review of their live act appeared in Melody Maker. Lambert and Stamp attracted the attention of the American producer Shel Talmy, who had produced the Kinks. Townshend had written a song, "I Can't Explain", that deliberately sounded like the Kinks to attract Talmy's attention. Talmy saw the group in rehearsals and was impressed. He signed them to his production company, and sold the recording to the US arm of Decca Records, which meant that the group's early singles were released in Britain on Brunswick Records, one of UK Decca's labels for US artists. "I Can't Explain" was recorded in early November 1964 at Pye Studios in Marble Arch with the Ivy League on backing vocals, and Jimmy Page played fuzz guitar on the B-side, "Bald Headed Woman".

"I Can't Explain" became popular with pirate radio stations such as Radio Caroline. Pirate radio was important for bands as there were no commercial radio stations in the UK and BBC Radio played little pop music. The group gained further exposure when they appeared on the TV programme Ready Steady Go! Lambert and Stamp were tasked with finding "typical teens", and invited the group's regular audience from the Goldhawk Social Club. Enthusiastic reception on television and regular airplay on pirate radio helped the single slowly climb the charts in early 1965 until it reached the top 10. In early 1965, the Who made their first appearance on the TV music show, Top of the Pops, at the BBC's Dickenson Road Studios in Manchester, with "I Can't Explain".

The follow-up single, "Anyway, Anyhow, Anywhere", by Townshend and Daltrey, features guitar noises such as pick sliding, toggle switching and feedback, which was so unconventional that it was initially rejected by the US arm of Decca. The single reached the top 10 in the UK and was used as the theme song to Ready Steady Go!

The transition to a hit-making band with original material, encouraged by Lambert, did not sit well with Daltrey, and a recording session of R&B covers went unreleased. The Who were not close friends either, apart from Moon and Entwistle, who enjoyed visiting nightclubs together in the West End of London. The group experienced a difficult time when touring Denmark in September, which culminated in Daltrey throwing Moon's amphetamines down the toilet and assaulting him. Immediately on returning to Britain, Daltrey was sacked, but was reinstated on the condition that the group became a democracy without his dominant leadership. At this time, the group enlisted Richard Cole as a roadie.

"My Generation"
"My Generation" includes the line "Hope I die before I get old".

The next single, "My Generation", followed in October. Townshend had written it as a slow blues, but after several abortive attempts, it was turned into a more powerful song with a bass solo from Entwistle. The song used gimmicks such as a vocal stutter to simulate the speech of a mod on amphetamines, and two key changes. Townshend insisted in interviews that the lyrics "Hope I die before I get old" were not meant to be taken literally. Peaking at No. 2, "My Generation" is the group's highest-charting single in the UK. The debut album My Generation was released in late 1965. Among original material by Townshend, including the title track and "The Kids Are Alright", the album has several James Brown covers from the session earlier that year that Daltrey favoured.

After My Generation, the Who fell out with Talmy, which abruptly ended their recording contract. The resulting legal acrimony meant Talmy held the rights to the master tapes, which prevented the album from being reissued until 2002. The Who were signed to Robert Stigwood's label, Reaction, and released "Substitute". Townshend said he wrote the song about an identity crisis, and as a parody of the Rolling Stones's "19th Nervous Breakdown". It was the first single to feature him playing an acoustic twelve-string guitar. Talmy took legal action over the B-side, "Instant Party", and the single was withdrawn. A new B-side, "Waltz for a Pig", was recorded by the GBO under the pseudonym "The Who Orchestra".

In 1966 the Who released "I'm a Boy", about a boy dressed as a girl, taken from an abortive collection of songs called Quads; "Happy Jack"; and an EP, Ready Steady Who, that tied in with their regular appearances on Ready Steady Go! The group continued to have conflict; on 20 May, Moon and Entwistle were late to a gig having been on the Ready Steady Go! set with the Beach Boys' Bruce Johnston. During "My Generation", Townshend attacked Moon with his guitar; Moon suffered a black eye and bruises, and he and Entwistle left the band, but changed their minds and rejoined a week later. Moon kept looking for other work, and Jeff Beck had him play drums on "Beck's Bolero" (with Page, John Paul Jones and Nicky Hopkins) because he was "trying to get Keith out of the Who".

==== A Quick One, Monterey and The Who Sell Out ====
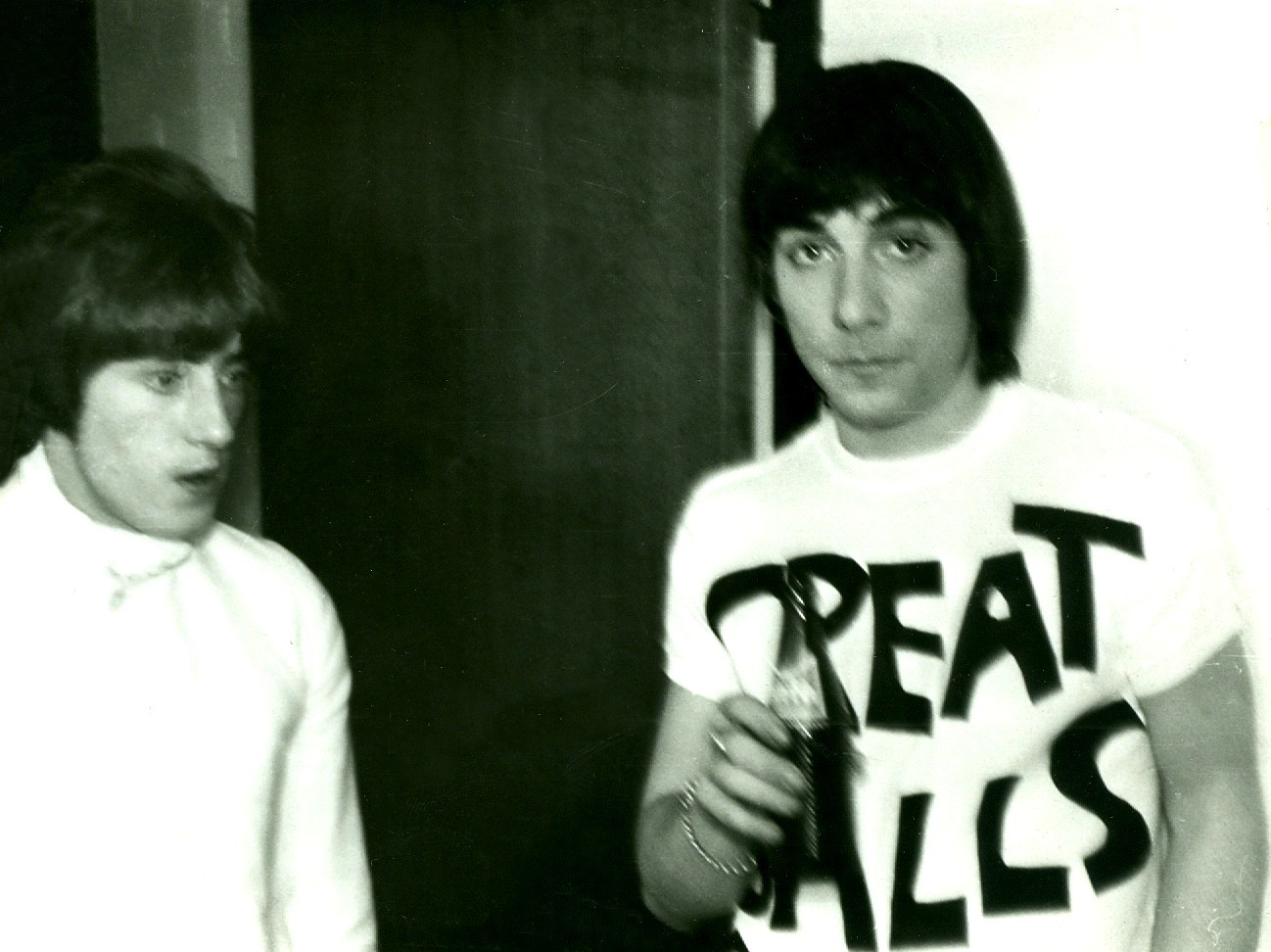
Roger Daltrey and Keith Moon backstage in 1967.

To alleviate financial pressure on the band, Lambert arranged a song-writing deal which required each member to write two songs for the next album. Entwistle contributed "Boris the Spider" and "Whiskey Man" and found a niche role as second songwriter. The band found they needed to fill an extra ten minutes, and Lambert encouraged Townshend to write a longer piece, "A Quick One, While He's Away". The suite of song fragments is about a girl who has an affair while her lover is away, but is ultimately forgiven. The album was titled A Quick One (Happy Jack in the US), and reached No. 4 in the UK charts. It was followed in 1967 by the UK Top 5 single "Pictures of Lily".

By 1966, Ready Steady Go! had ended, the mod movement was becoming unfashionable, and the Who found themselves in competition on the London circuit with groups including Cream and the Jimi Hendrix Experience. Lambert and Stamp realised that commercial success in the US was paramount to the group's future, and arranged a deal with promoter Frank Barsalona for a short package tour in New York. The group's performances, which still involved smashing guitars and kicking over drums, were well received, and led to their first major US appearance at the Monterey Pop Festival. The group, especially Moon, were not fond of the hippie movement, and thought their violent stage act would stand in sharp contrast to the peaceful atmosphere of the festival. Hendrix was also on the bill, and was also going to smash his guitar on stage. Townshend verbally abused Hendrix and accused him of stealing his act, and the pair argued about who should go on stage first, with the Who winning the argument. The Who brought hired equipment to the festival; Hendrix shipped over his regular touring gear from Britain, including a full Marshall stack. According to biographer Tony Fletcher, Hendrix sounded "so much better than the Who it was embarrassing". The Who's appearance at Monterey gave them recognition in the US, and "Happy Jack" reached the top 30.

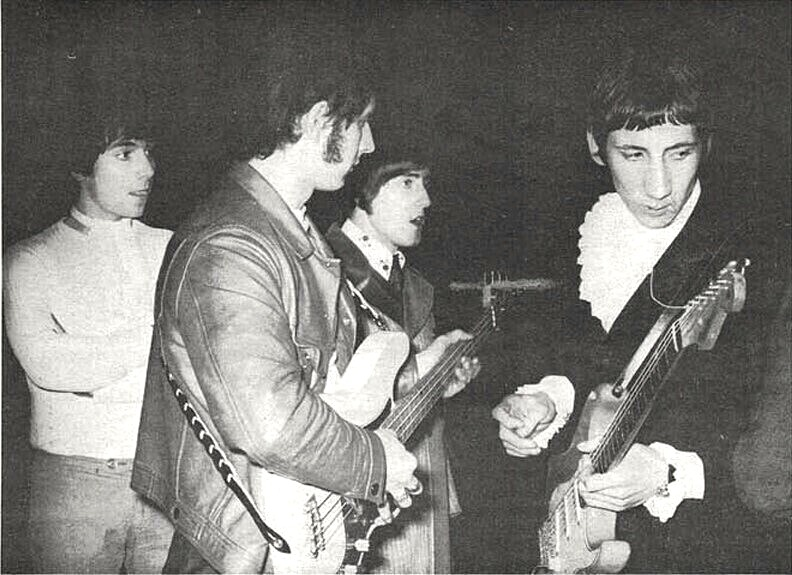
The Who in 1967.

The group followed Monterey with a US tour supporting Herman's Hermits. The Hermits were a straightforward pop band and enjoyed drugs and practical jokes. They bonded with Moon, who was excited to learn that cherry bombs were legal to purchase in Alabama. Moon acquired a reputation for destroying hotel rooms while on tour, with a particular interest in blowing up toilets. Entwistle said the first cherry bomb they tried "blew a hole in the suitcase and the chair". Moon recalled his first attempt to flush one down the toilet: "[A]ll that porcelain flying through the air was quite unforgettable. I never realised dynamite was so powerful". After a gig in Flint, Michigan on Moon's 21st birthday on 23 August 1967, the entourage caused $24,000 of damage at the hotel, and Moon knocked out one of his front teeth. Daltrey later said that the tour brought the band closer, and as the support act, they could turn up and perform a short show without any major responsibilities.

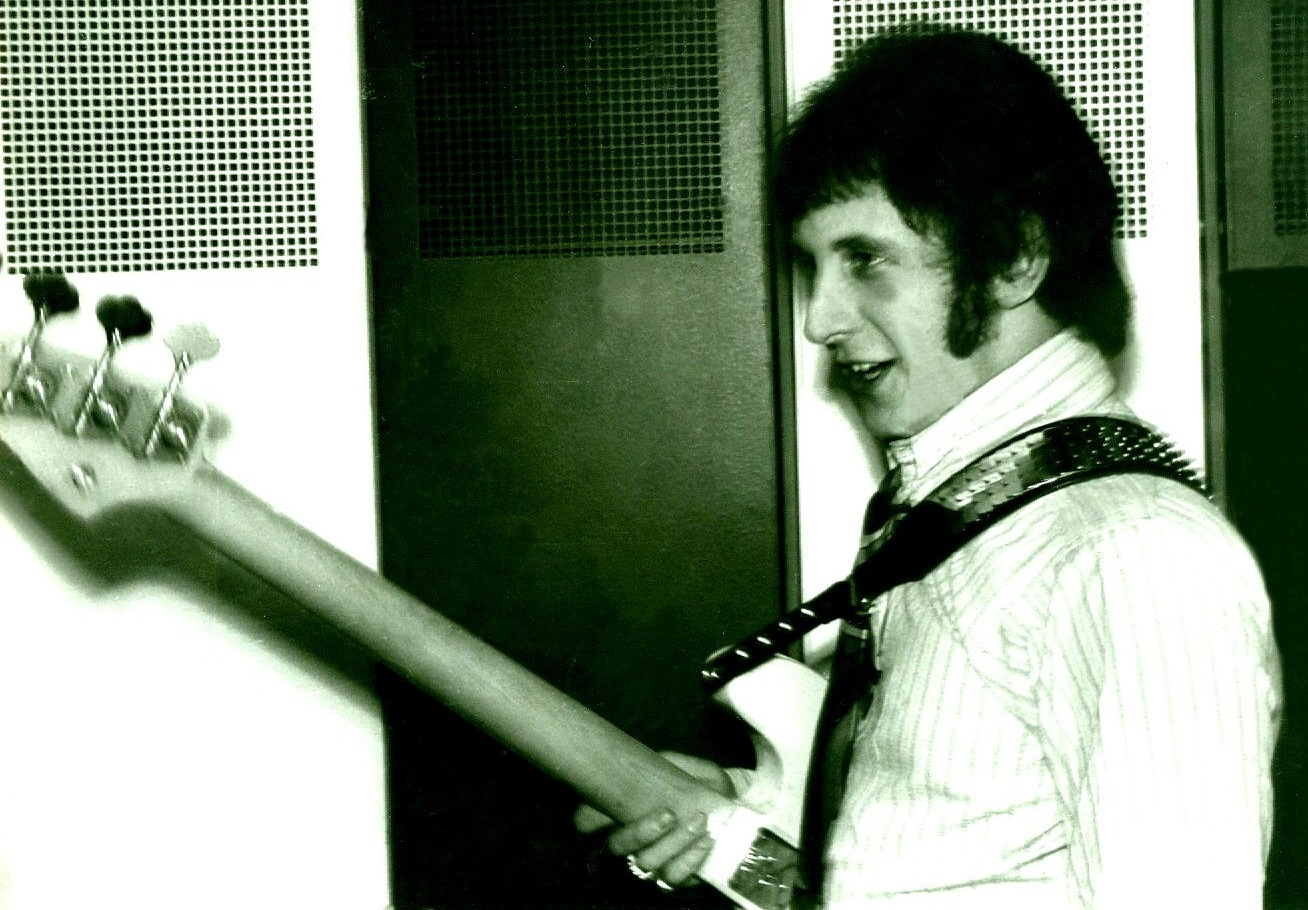
John Entwistle backstage in 1967.

After the Hermits tour, the Who recorded their next single, "I Can See for Miles", which Townshend had written in 1966 but had avoided recording until he was sure it could be produced well. Townshend called it "the ultimate Who record", and was disappointed it reached only No. 10 in the UK. It became their best selling single in the US, reaching No. 9. The group toured the US again with Eric Burdon and the Animals, including an appearance on The Smothers Brothers Comedy Hour, miming to "I Can See For Miles" and "My Generation". Moon bribed a stage hand to put explosives in his drum kit, who loaded it with ten times the expected quantity. The resulting detonation threw Moon off his drum riser and his arm was cut by a flying piece of a cymbal. Townshend's hair was singed and his left ear left ringing, and a camera and studio monitor were destroyed.

The Who Sell Out (1967) is a concept album parodying pirate radio, which had been outlawed in August 1967 by the Marine Broadcasting Offences Act 1967. It included humorous jingles and mock commercials between songs, a mini rock opera called "Rael", and "I Can See For Miles". The Who declared themselves a pop art group and thus viewed advertising as an artform; they recorded a wide variety of radio advertisements, such as for canned milkshakes and the American Cancer Society, in defiance of the rising anti-consumerist ethos of the hippie counterculture. Townshend stated, "We don't change offstage. We live pop art". Later that year, Lambert and Stamp formed a record label, Track Records, with distribution by Polydor. As well as signing Hendrix, Track became the imprint for all the Who's UK output until the mid-1970s.

The group started 1968 by touring Australia and New Zealand with the Small Faces. The groups had trouble with the local authorities and the New Zealand Truth called them "unwashed, foul-smelling, booze-swilling no-hopers". After an incident that took place on a flight to Sydney, the band were briefly arrested in Melbourne and then forced to leave the country; Prime Minister John Gorton sent a telegram to the Who telling them never to return to Australia. The Who would not return to Australia until 2004. They continued to tour across the US and Canada during the first half of the year.

==== Tommy, Woodstock, Isle of Wight and Live at Leeds ====
By 1968, the Who had started to attract attention in the underground press. Townshend had stopped using drugs and became interested in the teachings of Meher Baba. In August, he gave an interview to Rolling Stone editor Jann Wenner describing in detail the plot of a new album project and its relationship to Baba's teachings. The album went through several names during recording, including Deaf Dumb and Blind Boy and Amazing Journey; Townshend settled on Tommy for the album about the life of a deaf, dumb and blind boy, and his attempt to communicate with others. Some songs, such as "Welcome" and "Amazing Journey", were inspired by Baba's teaching, and others came from observations within the band. "Sally Simpson" is about a fan who tried to climb on stage at a gig by the Doors that they attended and "Pinball Wizard" was written so that New York Times critic Nik Cohn, a pinball enthusiast, would give the album a good review. Townshend later said, "I wanted the story of Tommy to have several levels ... a rock singles level and a bigger concept level", containing the spiritual message he wanted as well as being entertaining. The album was projected for a Christmas 1968 release but recording stalled after Townshend decided to make a double album to cover the story in sufficient depth.

By the end of the year, 18 months of touring had led to a well-rehearsed and tight live band, which was evident when they performed "A Quick One, While He's Away" at The Rolling Stones Rock and Roll Circus television special. The Stones considered their own performance lacklustre, and the project was never broadcast. The Who had not released an album in over a year, and had not completed the recording of Tommy, which continued well into 1969, interspersed with gigs at weekends. Lambert was a key figure in keeping the group focused and getting the album completed, and typed up a script to help them understand the story and how the songs fitted together.

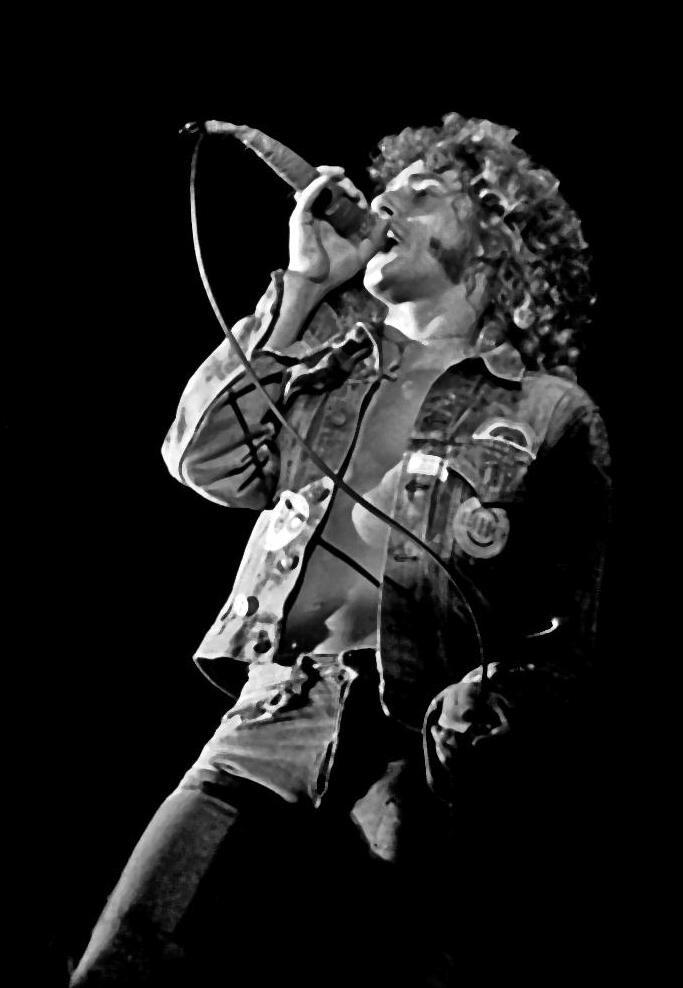
By the time the Who were touring Tommy, Daltrey's stage image had changed to include long hair and open shirts.

The album was released in May with the accompanying single, "Pinball Wizard", a debut performance at Ronnie Scott's, and a tour, playing most of the new album live. Tommy sold 200,000 copies in the US in its first two weeks, and was a critical success, with Life saying, "for sheer power, invention and brilliance of performance, Tommy outstrips anything which has ever come out of a recording studio". Melody Maker declared: "Surely the Who are now the band against which all others are to be judged". Daltrey had significantly improved as a singer, and set a template for rock singers in the 1970s by growing his hair long and wearing open shirts on stage. Townshend had taken to wearing a boiler suit and Doc Martens shoes.

In August, the Who performed at the Woodstock Festival, despite being reluctant and demanding $13,000 up front. Townshend gave criltic Robert Christgau a ride to Woodstock. The group was scheduled to appear on Saturday night, 16 August, but the festival ran late and they did not take to the stage until 5 am on Sunday; they played most of Tommy. During their performance, Yippie leader Abbie Hoffman interrupted the set to give a political speech about the arrest of John Sinclair; Townshend kicked him off stage, shouting: "Fuck off my fucking stage!" During "See Me, Feel Me", the sun rose almost as if on cue; Entwistle later said, "God was our lighting man". At the end, Townshend threw his guitar into the audience. The set was professionally recorded and filmed, and portions appear in the film Woodstock . The Who were later critical of the festival: Roadie John "Wiggie" Wolff, who arranged the band's payment, described it as "a shambles"; Daltrey declared it as "the worst gig [they] ever played"; and Townshend said, "I thought the whole of America had gone mad".

A more enjoyable appearance came a few weeks later at the 1969 Isle of Wight Festival in England, which Townshend described as "a great concert for" the band. According to Townshend, at the end of the Isle of Wight gig the field was covered in rubbish left by fans (which the band's roadies helped to clear up), which inspired the lyric "teenage wasteland".

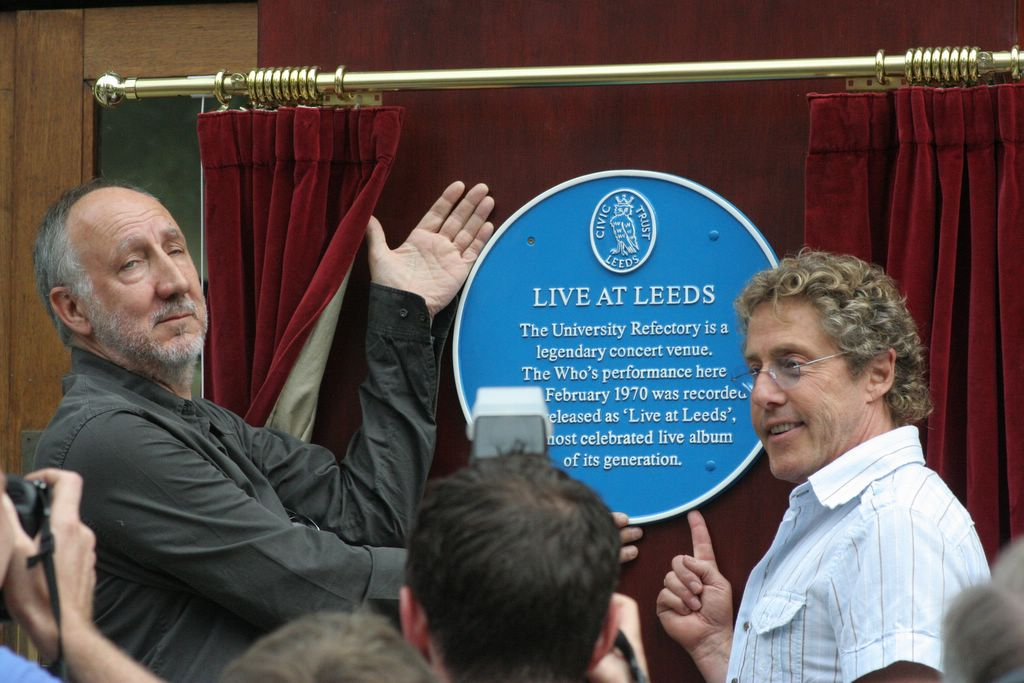
Pete Townshend and Roger Daltrey unveiling a blue plaque at Leeds University, where Live at Leeds was recorded in 1970.

By 1970, the Who were widely considered one of the best and most popular live rock bands; Chris Charlesworth described their concerts as "leading to a kind of rock nirvana that most bands can only dream about". They decided a live album would help demonstrate how different the sound at their gigs was to Tommy, and set about listening to the hours of recordings they had accumulated. Townshend baulked at the prospect of doing so, and demanded that all the tapes be burned. Instead, they booked two shows, one in Leeds on 14 February, and one in Hull the following day, with the intention of recording a live album. Technical problems from the Hull gig resulted in the Leeds gig being used, which became Live at Leeds. The album is viewed by several critics including The Independent, The Telegraph and the BBC, as one of the best live rock albums of all time.

The Tommy tour included shows in European opera houses and saw the Who become the first rock act to play at the Metropolitan Opera in New York City. In March, the Who released the UK top 20 hit "The Seeker", continuing a theme of issuing singles separate to albums. Townshend wrote the song to commemorate the common man, as a contrast to the themes on Tommy. The tour included their second appearance at the Isle of Wight Festival. A record attendance in England which the Guinness Book of Records estimated at between 600,000 and 700,000 people, the Who began their set at 2:00 A.M. on Sunday 30 August.

==== Lifehouse and Who's Next ====
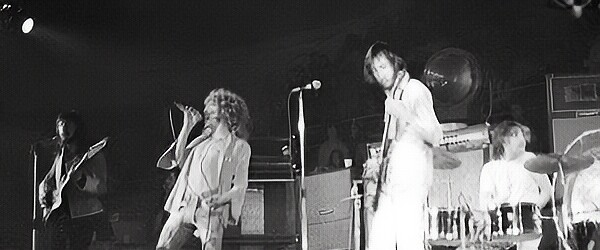
The Who at the Coliseum, Charlotte, North Carolina, 20 November 1971.

Tommy secured the Who's future, and made them millionaires. The group reacted in different ways – Daltrey and Entwistle lived comfortably, Townshend was embarrassed at his wealth, which he felt was at odds with Meher Baba's ideals, and Moon spent frivolously.

During the latter part of 1970, Townshend conceived a follow-up Tommy: Lifehouse, which was to be a multi-media project about the relationship between an artist and his audience. He developed ideas in his home studio, creating layers of synthesizers, and the Young Vic theatre in London was booked for a series of experimental concerts. Townshend approached the gigs with optimism; the rest of the band were just happy to be gigging again. Eventually, the others complained to Townshend that the project was too complicated and they should simply record another album. Things deteriorated until Townshend had a nervous breakdown and abandoned Lifehouse. Entwistle was the first member to release a solo album, Smash Your Head Against the Wall, in May 1971.

Recording at the Record Plant in New York City in March 1971 was abandoned when Lambert's addiction to hard drugs interfered with his ability to produce. The group restarted with Glyn Johns in April. The album was mostly Lifehouse material, with one unrelated song by Entwistle, "My Wife", and was released as Who's Next in August. The album reached No. 1 in the UK and No. 4 in the US. "Baba O'Riley" and "Won't Get Fooled Again" are early examples of synthesizer use in rock, featuring keyboard sounds generated in real time by a Lowrey organ; on "Won't Get Fooled Again", it was further processed through a VCS3 synthesizer. The synthesizer intro to "Baba O'Riley" was programmed based on Meher Baba's vital stats, and the track featured a violin solo by Dave Arbus. The other half of the title comes from Terry Riley, a composer Townsend admired. The album was a critical and commercial success, and has been certified 3× platinum by the RIAA. The Who continued to issue Lifehouse-related material over the next few years, including the singles "Let's See Action", "Join Together" and "Relay".

The band went back on tour, and "Baba O' Riley" and "Won't Get Fooled Again" became live favourites. In November they performed at the newly renovated Rainbow Theatre in London for three nights, continuing in the US later that month, where Robert Hilburn of the Los Angeles Times described the Who as "the Greatest Show on Earth". The tour was slightly disrupted at the Civic Auditorium in San Francisco on 12 December when Moon passed out over his kit after overdosing on brandy and barbiturates. He recovered and completed the gig, playing to his usual strength.

==== Quadrophenia, Tommy film and The Who by Numbers ====
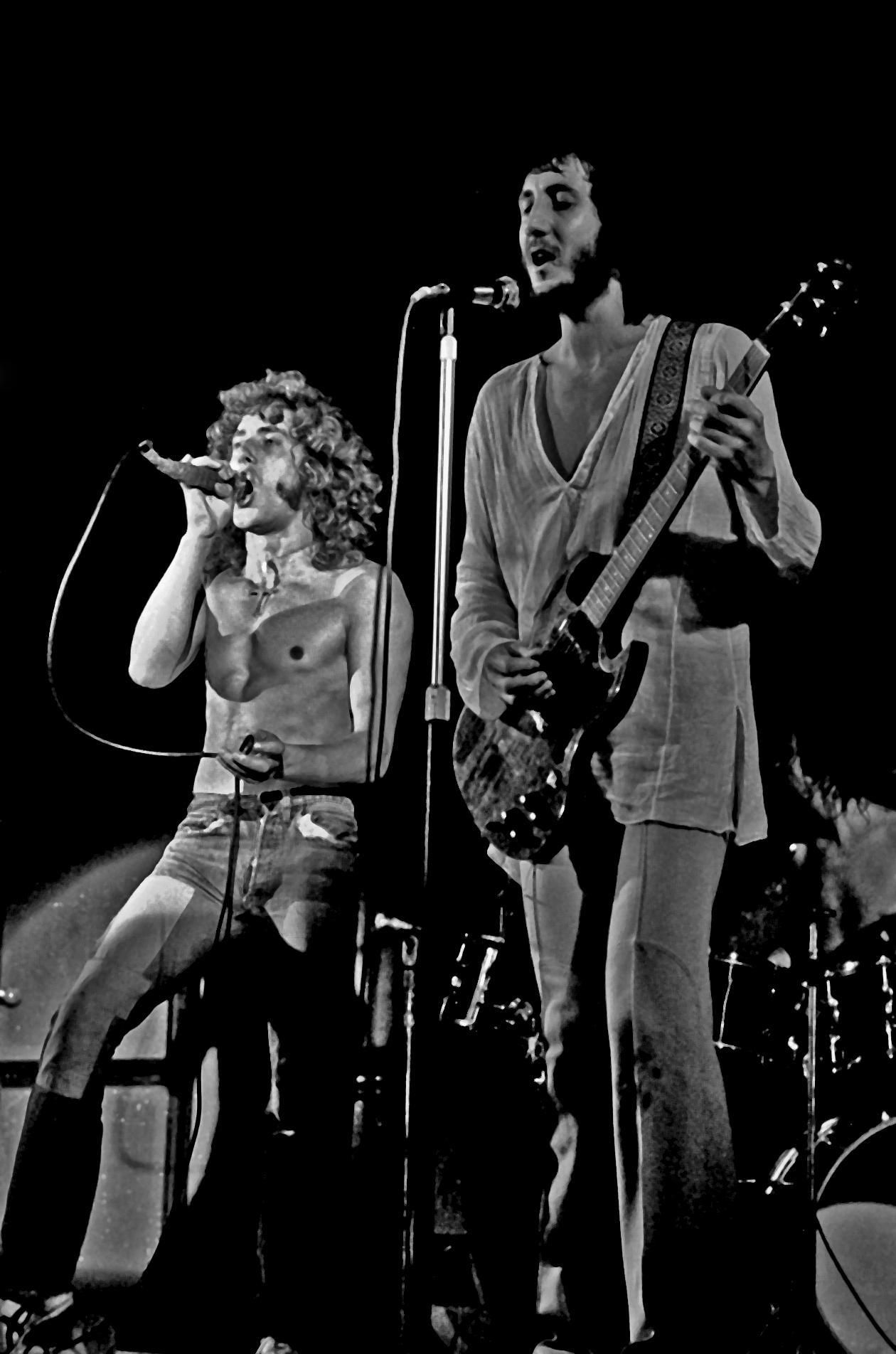
The Who at the Ernst-Mercke-Halle, Hamburg, 12 August 1972

After touring Who's Next, and needing time to write a follow-up, Townshend insisted that the Who take a lengthy break, as they had not stopped touring since the band started. There was no group activity until May 1972, when they started working on a proposed new album, Rock Is Dead—Long Live Rock!, but, unhappy with the recordings, abandoned the sessions. Tensions began to emerge as Townshend believed Daltrey just wanted a money-making band and Daltrey thought Townshend's projects were getting pretentious. Moon's behaviour was becoming increasingly destructive and problematic through excessive drinking and drug use, and a desire to party and tour. Daltrey performed an audit of the group's finances and discovered that Lambert and Stamp had not kept sufficient records. He believed them to be no longer effective managers, which Townshend and Moon disputed. The painful dissolution of the managerial and personal relationships are recounted in James D. Cooper's 2014 retrospective documentary, Lambert & Stamp. Following a short European tour, the remainder of 1972 was spent working on an orchestral version of Tommy with Lou Reizner.

By 1973, the Who turned to recording Quadrophenia, about mod and its subculture, set against clashes with Rockers in early 1960s Britain. The story is about a boy named Jimmy, who undergoes a personality crisis, and his relationship with his family, friends and mod culture. The music features four themes, reflecting the four personalities of the Who. Townshend played multi-tracked synthesizers, and Entwistle played several overdubbed horn parts. By the time the album was being recorded, relationships between the band and Lambert and Stamp had broken down irreparably, and Bill Curbishley replaced them. The album reached No. 2 in both the UK and US.

The Quadrophenia tour started in Stoke on Trent in October and was immediately beset with problems. Daltrey resisted Townshend's wish to add Joe Cocker's keyboardist Chris Stainton (who played on the album) to the touring band. As a compromise, Townshend assembled the keyboard and synthesizer parts on backing tapes, as such a strategy had been successful with "Baba O'Riley" and "Won't Get Fooled Again". The technology was not sophisticated enough to deal with the demands of the music; added to this issue, tour rehearsals had been interrupted due to an argument that culminated in Daltrey punching Townshend and knocking him out cold. At a gig in Newcastle, the tapes completely malfunctioned, and an enraged Townshend dragged sound-man Bob Pridden on-stage, screamed at him, kicked all the amps over and partially destroyed the backing tapes. The show was abandoned for an "oldies" set, at the end of which Townshend smashed his guitar and Moon kicked over his drumkit. The Independent described this gig as one of the worst of all time. The US tour started on 20 November at the Cow Palace in Daly City, California; Moon passed out during "Won't Get Fooled Again" and during "Magic Bus". Townshend asked the audience, "Can anyone play the drums? – I mean somebody good". An audience member, Scot Halpin, filled in for the rest of the show. After a show in Montreal, the band (except for Daltrey, who retired to bed early) caused so much damage to their hotel room, including destroying an antique painting and ramming a marble table through a wall, that federal law enforcement arrested them.

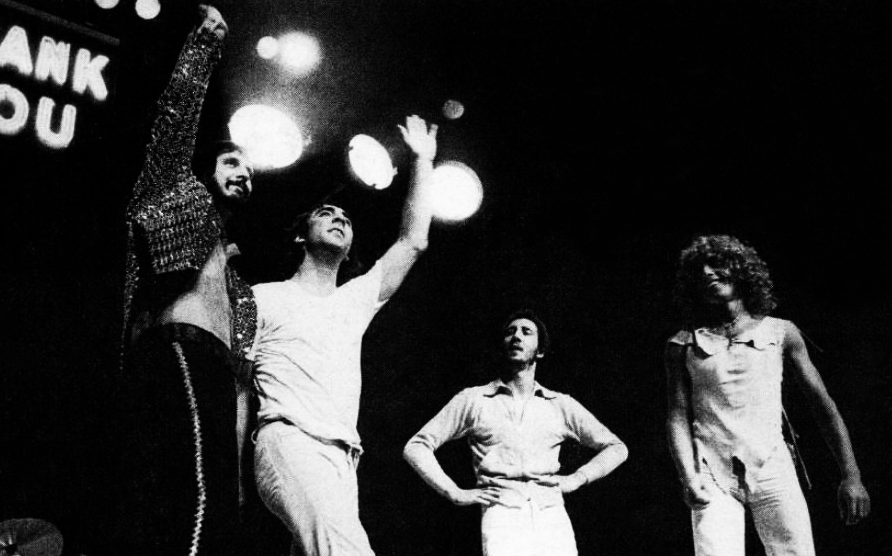
Promotional photograph celebrating the band's tenth anniversary, December 1974

By 1974, work had begun in earnest on a Tommy film. Stigwood suggested Ken Russell as director, whose work Townshend had admired. The film featured a star-studded cast, including Ann-Margret, Oliver Reed, Eric Clapton, Tina Turner, Elton John and Jack Nicholson and the Who.. David Essex auditioned for the title role, but the band persuaded Daltrey to take it. Townshend and Entwistle worked on the soundtrack for most of the year, handling the bulk of the instrumentation. Moon had moved to Los Angeles, so they used session drummers, including Kenney Jones. Elton John used his own band for "Pinball Wizard". Filming was from April until August. 1,500 extras appeared in the "Pinball Wizard" sequence.

The film premiered on 18 March 1975 to a standing ovation. Townshend was nominated for the Academy Award for Best Original Score. Tommy was shown at the 1975 Cannes Film Festival, but not in the main competition. It won the award for Rock Movie of the Year in the First Annual Rock Music Awards and generated over $2 million in its first month. The soundtrack album reached number two on the Billboard charts.

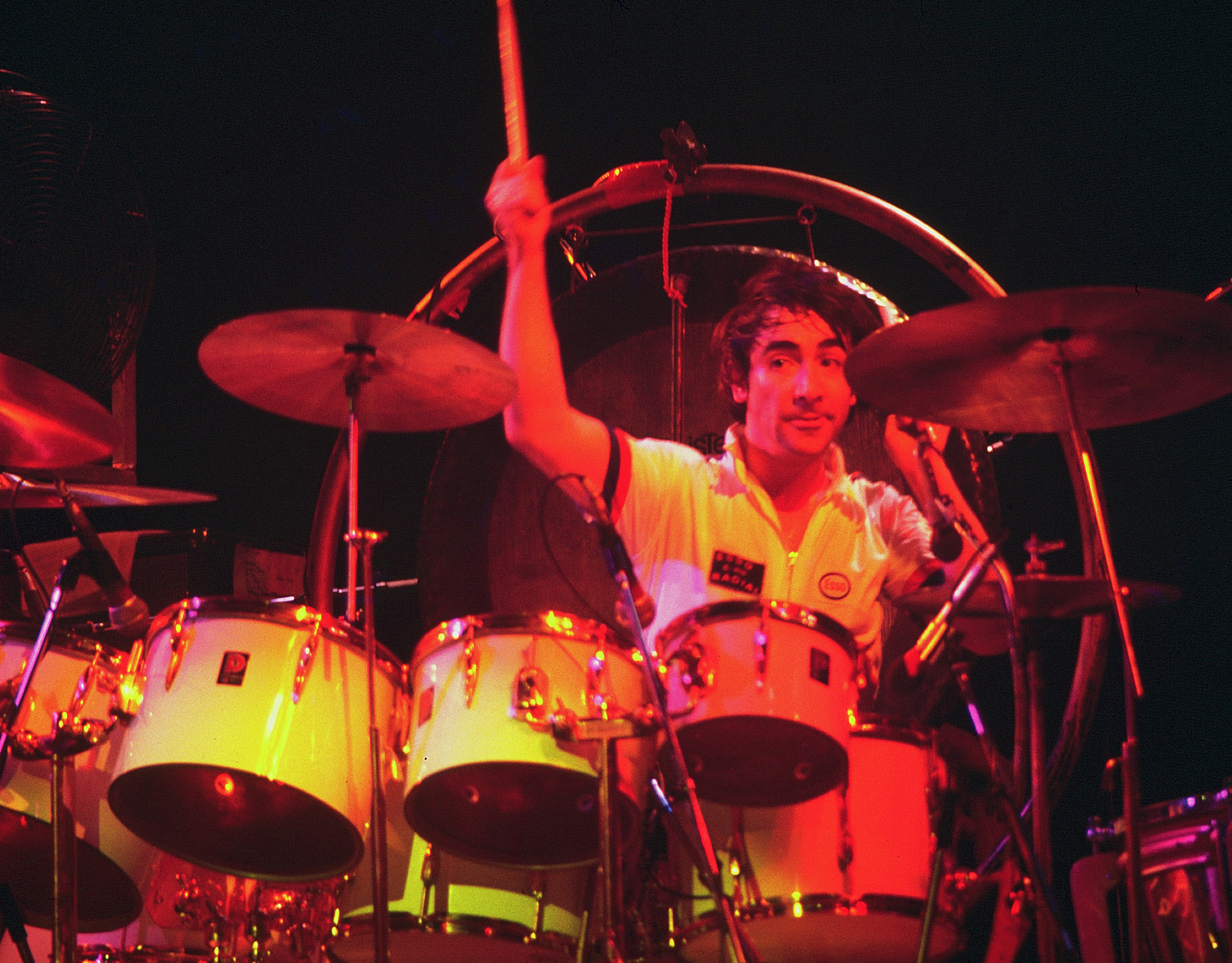
Keith Moon in 1975

Work on Tommy took up most of 1974, and live performances by the Who were restricted to a show in May at The Valley, the home of Charlton Athletic, in front of 80,000 fans, and a few dates at Madison Square Garden in June. Towards the end of the year, the group released the out-takes album Odds & Sods, which featured several songs from the aborted Lifehouse project.

In 1975, Daltrey and Townshend disagreed about the band's future and criticised each other via interviews in the New Musical Express. Daltrey was grateful that the Who had saved him from a career as a sheet-metal worker and was unhappy at Townshend not playing well; Townshend felt the commitment of the group prevented him from releasing solo material. The next album, The Who by Numbers, had introspective songs from Townshend dealing with disillusionment, such as "However Much I Booze" and "How Many Friends"; they resembled his later solo work. Entwistle's "Success Story" gave a humorous look at the music industry, and "Squeeze Box" was a hit single. The group toured from October, playing little new material and few Quadrophenia numbers, and reintroducing several from Tommy. The American leg of the tour began in Houston to a crowd of 18,000 at The Summit Arena, and was supported by Toots and the Maytals. On 6 December 1975, the Who set the record for largest indoor concert at the Pontiac Silverdome, attended by 78,000. On 31 May 1976, they played a second concert at the Valley which was listed in the Guinness Book of Records as the world's loudest concert at over 120 dB. Townshend had become fed up of touring but Entwistle considered live performance to be at a peak.

==== Who Are You and Moon's death ====
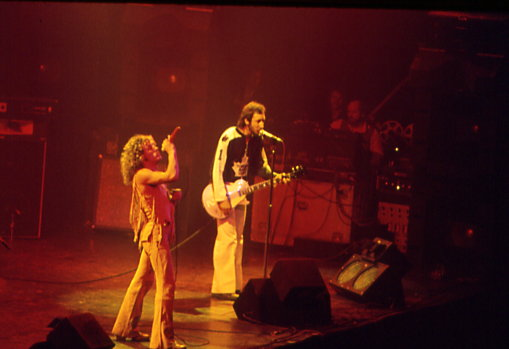
Daltrey and Townshend, 21 October 1976, Maple Leaf Gardens, Toronto, Ontario – their last public gig with Moon

After the 1976 tour, Townshend took most of the following year off to spend time with his family. He discovered that former Beatles and Rolling Stones manager Allen Klein had bought a stake in his publishing company. A settlement was reached, but Townshend was upset and disillusioned that Klein had attempted to take ownership of his songs. Townshend went to the Speakeasy where he met the Sex Pistols' Steve Jones and Paul Cook, fans of the Who. After leaving, he passed out in a doorway, where a policeman said he would not be arrested if he could stand and walk. The events inspired the title track of the next album.

The group reconvened in September 1977, but Townshend announced there would be no live performances for the immediate future, a decision that Daltrey endorsed. By this point, Moon was so unhealthy that the Who conceded it would be difficult for him to cope with touring. The only gig that year was an informal show on 15 December at the Gaumont State Cinema in Kilburn, London, filmed for the documentary The Kids Are Alright. The band had not played for 14 months, and their performance was so weak that the footage was not used. Moon's playing was particularly lacklustre and he had gained a lot of weight, though Daltrey later said, "even at his worst, Keith Moon was amazing".

Recording of Who Are You started in January 1978. Daltrey clashed with Johns over the production of his vocals, and Moon's drumming was so poor that Daltrey and Entwistle considered firing him. Moon's playing improved, but on one track, "Music Must Change", he was replaced as he could not play in 6/8 time. In May, the Who filmed another performance at Shepperton Sound Studios for The Kids Are Alright. This performance was strong, and several tracks were used in the film. It was the last gig Moon performed with the Who.

The album was released on 18 August, and became their biggest and fastest seller to date, peaking at No. 6 in the UK and No. 2 in the US. Instead of touring, Daltrey, Townshend and Moon did a series of promotional television interviews, and Entwistle worked on the soundtrack for The Kids Are Alright.

On 6 September, Moon attended a party held by Paul McCartney to celebrate Buddy Holly's birthday. Returning to his flat, Moon took 32 tablets of clomethiazole which had been prescribed to combat his alcohol withdrawal. He passed out the following morning and was discovered dead later that day.

=== 1978–1983 ===
==== Kenney Jones joins and Quadrophenia film ====
The day after Moon's death, Townshend issued the statement: "We are more determined than ever to carry on, and we want the spirit of the group to which Keith contributed so much to go on, although no human being can ever take his place". Phil Collins offered to leave Genesis to replace Moon, but Townshend had already asked Kenney Jones, previously of the Small Faces and the Faces. Jones officially joined the band in November 1978. At the same time Jones joined, keyboardist John "Rabbit" Bundrick was added to the line-up, though he was not made an official member. The 1979 tour also featured a four-piece horn section of Reg Brooks, Howie Casey, David Caswell and Dick Parry. On 2 May 1979, the Who returned to the stage with a concert at the Rainbow Theatre, followed by the Cannes Film Festival in France and dates at Madison Square Garden in New York.

The Kids Are Alright film was completed in early 1979. Released that summer alongside a soundtrack album, it was a retrospective of the band's career, directed by Jeff Stein. As well as footage shot especially for the film, including the Shepperton concert, the film also included a wealth of archive footage, including the band's performances at Monterey, Woodstock and Pontiac, in addition to clips from appearances on television shows such as Ready Steady Go!, the Smothers Brothers' show and Russell Harty Plus. Moon had died one week after seeing the rough cut with Daltrey. The film contains an audio track of Moon playing over silent footage of himself, which was the last time he ever played the drums.

The Quadrophenia film was released later that year. It was directed by Franc Roddam in his feature-directing début, and had straightforward acting rather than musical numbers as in Tommy. John Lydon was considered for Jimmy, but the role went to Phil Daniels. Sting played Jimmy's friend and fellow mod, the Ace Face. The soundtrack album was Jones' first appearance on a Who record, performing on newly written material not on the original album. The film was a critical and box office success in the UK and appealed to the growing mod revival movement. The Jam, the most significant mod revival band, were influenced by the Who, and critics noticed a similarity between Townshend and the group's leader, Paul Weller.

In December, the Who became the third band, after the Beatles and the Band, to appear on the cover of Time. The article, by Jay Cocks, said the band had outpaced, outlasted, outlived and outclassed all of their rock band contemporaries.

==== Cincinnati tragedy ====
On 3 December 1979, a crowd crush at a Who gig at the Riverfront Coliseum, Cincinnati killed 11 fans. This was partly due to the festival seating, where the first to enter get the best positions. Some fans waiting outside mistook the band's soundcheck for the concert, and attempted to force their way inside. As only a few entrance doors were opened, a bottleneck situation ensued with thousands trying to gain entry, and the crush became deadly.

The Who were not told until after the show because civic authorities feared crowd problems if the concert were cancelled. The band were deeply shaken upon learning of it and requested that appropriate safety precautions be taken in the future. The following evening, in Buffalo, New York, Daltrey told the crowd that the band had "lost a lot of family last night and this show's for them".

==== Face Dances, It's Hard and break-up ====
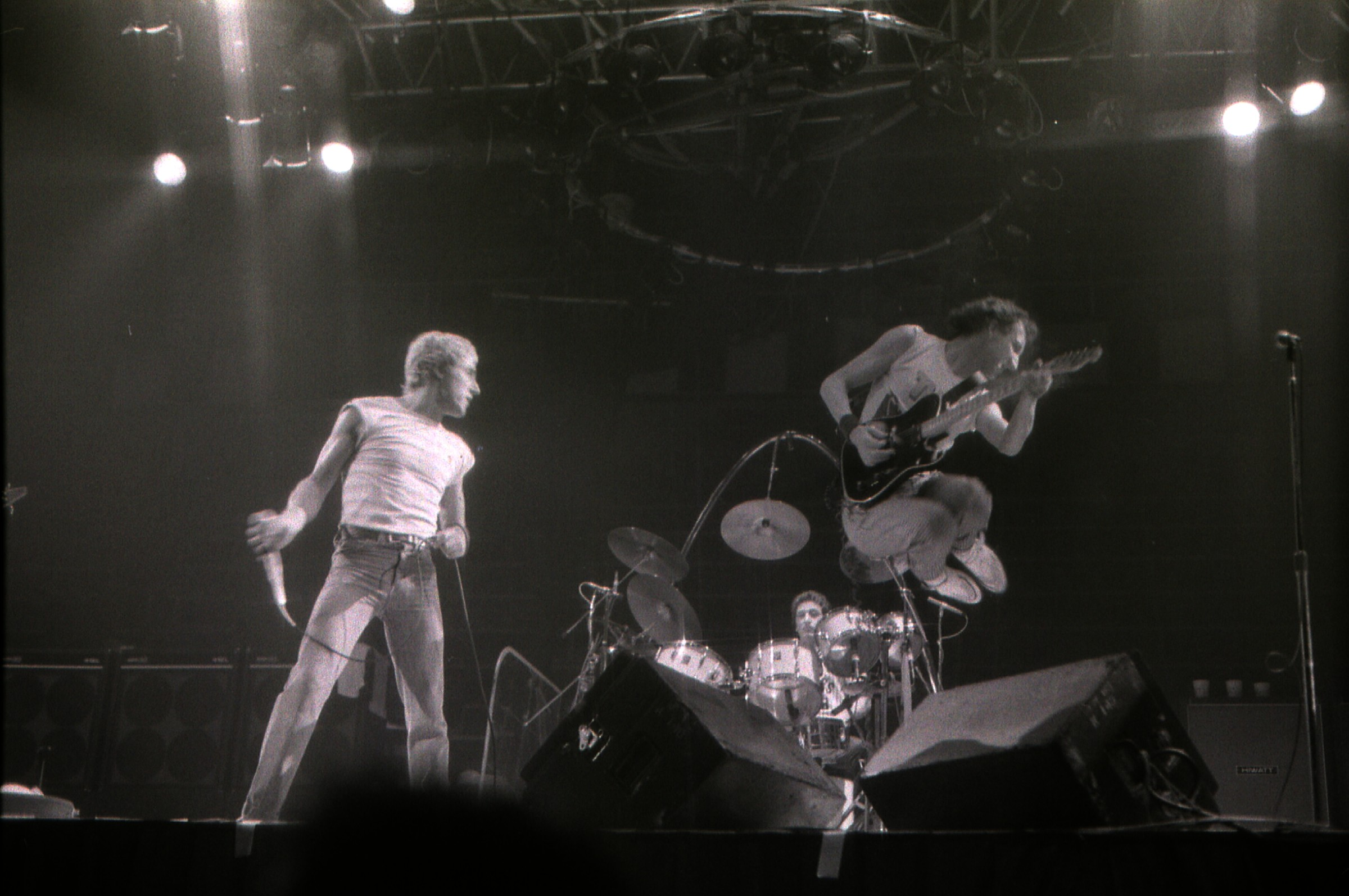
The Who in Toronto, 1980.

Daltrey took a break in 1980 to work on the film McVicar, in which he took the lead role of bank robber John McVicar. The soundtrack album is a Daltrey solo album, though all members of the Who are included in the supporting musicians, and was his most successful solo release.

The Who released two studio albums with Jones as drummer, Face Dances (1981) and It's Hard (1982). Face Dances produced a US top 20 and UK top ten hit with the single "You Better You Bet", whose video was one of the first shown on MTV. Both Face Dances and It's Hard sold well and the latter received a five-star review in Rolling Stone. The single "Eminence Front" from It's Hard was a hit, and became a regular at live shows. By this time Townshend had fallen into depression, wondering if he was no longer a visionary. He was again at odds with Daltrey and Entwistle, who merely wanted to tour and play hits and thought Townshend had saved his best songs for his solo album, Empty Glass (1980). Jones' drumming style was very different from Moon's and this drew criticism from Daltrey and Entwistle. Entwistle was also unhappy with the inclusion of Bundrick, and wished for the band to return to a four-piece line-up without keyboards. Townshend briefly became addicted to heroin before cleaning up early in 1982 after treatment with Meg Patterson.

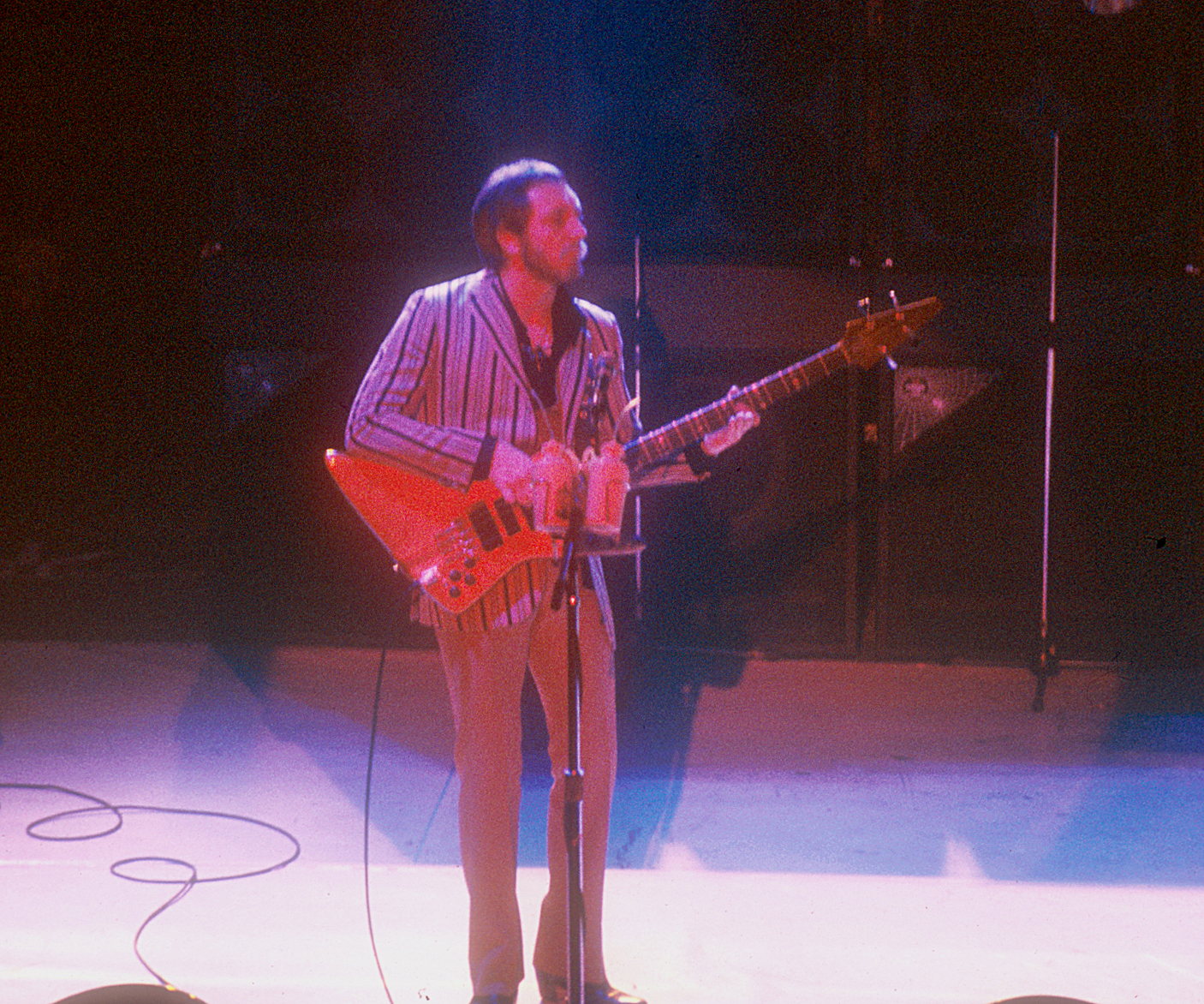
John Entwistle performing with the Who at the Manchester Apollo, 1981.

Townshend wanted the Who to stop touring and become a studio act; Entwistle threatened to quit, saying, "I don't intend to get off the road ... there's not much I can do about it except hope they change their minds". Townshend did not change his mind, and so the Who, with Tim Gorman replacing Bundrick on keyboards, embarked on a farewell tour of the US and Canada with the Clash as support, ending in Toronto on 17 December 1982. The tour was documented on the live album Who's Last.

Townshend spent part of 1983 writing material for a Who studio album owed to Warner Bros. Records from a contract in 1980, but he found himself unable to generate music appropriate for the Who and at the end of 1983 paid for himself and Jones to be released from the contract. On 16 December 1983, Townshend announced at a press conference that he was leaving the Who, effectively ending the band.

After the Who's break-up, Townshend focused on solo albums such as White City: A Novel (1985), The Iron Man (1989, featuring Daltrey and Entwistle and two songs credited to the Who), and Psychoderelict (1993).

=== Temporary reunions ===
==== Live Aid and Brit Awards ====
In July 1985, the Who performed at Live Aid at Wembley Stadium, London. The BBC transmission truck blew a fuse during the set, temporarily interrupting the broadcast. At the 1988 Brit Awards, at the Royal Albert Hall, the band were given the British Phonographic Industry's Lifetime Achievement Award. The short set they played there was the last time Jones played with the Who until 2014.

==== 25th anniversary tour ====
In 1989, the Who embarked on a 25th anniversary The Kids Are Alright reunion tour as a 15-piece band comprising Daltrey, Townshend and Entwistle with Bundrick, drummer Simon Phillips, percussionist Jody Linscott, guitarist Steve "Boltz" Bolton, a horn section of Simon Clarke, Simon Gardner, Roddy Lorimer, Tim Saunders and Neil Sidwell, and backing singers Chyna Gordon, Billy Nicholls and Cleveland Watkiss. Townshend had announced in 1987 that he suffered from tinnitus and alternated acoustic, rhythm and lead guitar to preserve his hearing. Their two shows at Sullivan Stadium in Foxborough, Massachusetts, sold 100,000 tickets in less than eight hours, beating previous records set there by U2 and David Bowie. The tour was briefly marred at a gig in Tacoma, Washington, where Townshend injured his hand on-stage. Some critics disliked the tour's over-produced and expanded line-up, calling it "the Who on Ice"; Stephen Thomas Erlewine of AllMusic said the tour "tarnished the reputation of the Who almost irreparably". Entwistle was also critical of the inclusion of so many musicians. Some shows on the tour included complete performances of Tommy with guests such as Phil Collins, Billy Idol and Elton John. A 2-CD live album, Join Together, was released in 1990.

==== Partial reunions ====
In 1990, the Who (Roger Daltrey, John Entwistle, Keith Moon and Pete Townshend) were inducted into the Rock and Roll Hall of Fame. Daltrey, Entwistle and Townsend attended the induction and performed with the house band, while Moon's daughter Amanda attended to represent her father. The group have a featured collection in the hall's museum, including one of Moon's velvet suits, a Warwick bass of Entwistle's, and a drumhead from 1968.

In 1991, the Who (Daltrey, Townshend and Entwistle with producer Jon Astley on drums) recorded a cover of Elton John's "Saturday Night's Alright for Fighting" for the tribute album Two Rooms: Celebrating the Songs of Elton John & Bernie Taupin. It was the last studio recording to feature Entwistle.

In 1994, Daltrey turned 50 and celebrated with two concerts at New York's Carnegie Hall. The shows included guest spots by Entwistle and Townshend. Although all three surviving original members of the Who attended, they appeared on stage together only during the finale, "Join Together", with the other guests. Daltrey toured that year with Entwistle, Zak Starkey on drums and Simon Townshend filling in for his brother as guitarist. That year saw the release of the Who's retrospective box set Thirty Years of Maximum R&B, with Daltrey, Townshend and Entwistle all being interviewed for its companion home video Thirty Years of Maximum R&B Live.

==== Revival of Quadrophenia ====
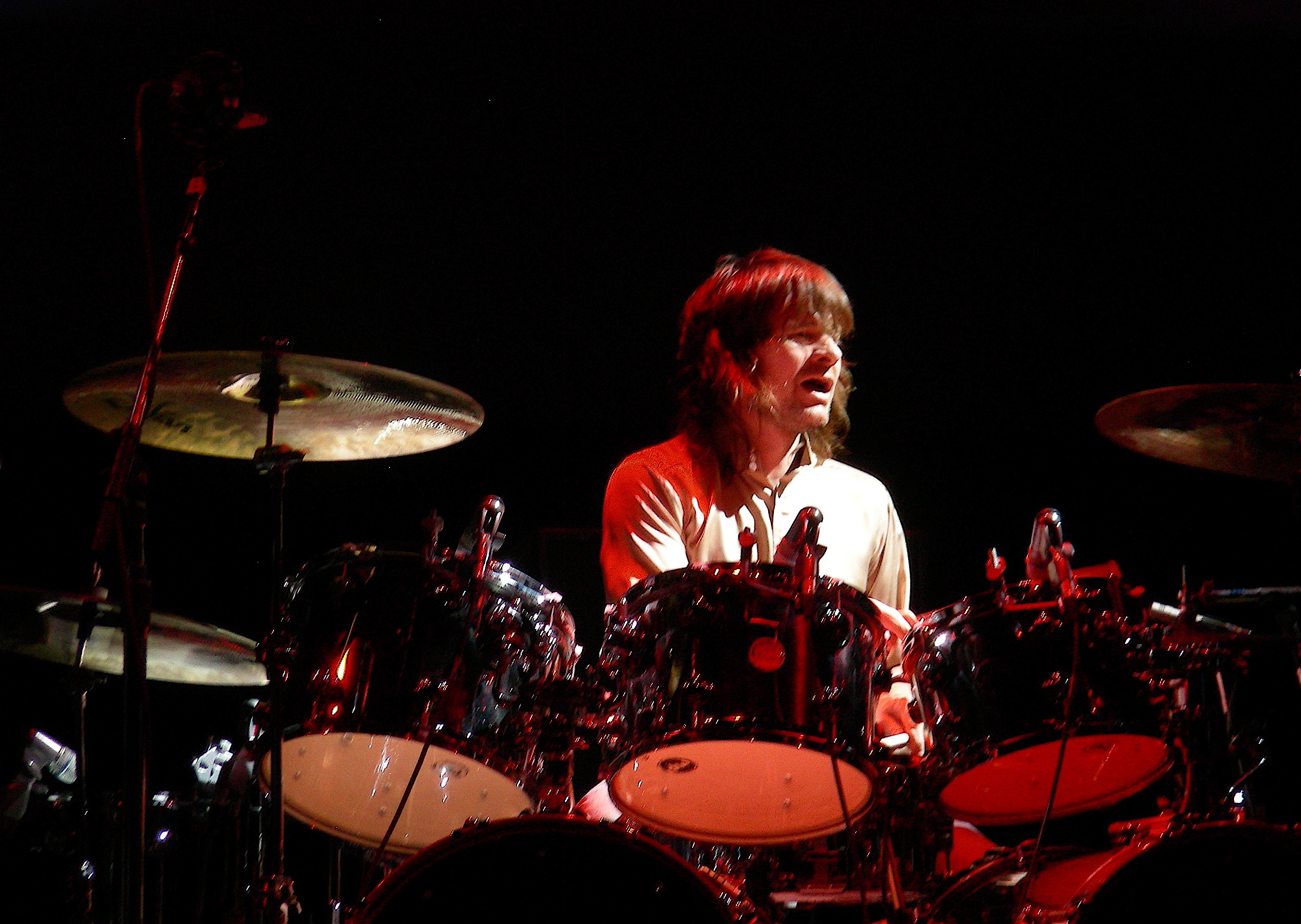
Zak Starkey had been the Who's main drummer from 1996 to 2025 and turned down an invitation to be a full-time member.

In 1996, Daltrey, Townshend and Entwistle performed Quadrophenia with Starkey on drums, Jody Linscott on percussion, Bundrick and Jon Carin on keyboards, Simon Townend on guitar, Billy Nicholls on backing vocals and a horn section of Dennis Farias, Simon Gardner, Nick Lane, Neil Sidwell and Roy Wiegand at Hyde Park. The performance was narrated by Phil Daniels, who had played Jimmy in the 1979 film. This was the first live performance of Quadrophenia in its entirety. Despite technical difficulties the show led to a six-night residency at Madison Square Garden and a US and European tour through 1996 and 1997 with the 11-piece line-up. Townshend played mostly acoustic guitar, but eventually was persuaded to play some electric. In 1998, VH1 ranked the Who ninth in their list of the "100 Greatest Artists of Rock 'n' Roll".

=== Permanent reunion ===
==== Charity shows and Entwistle's death ====
In late 1999, Daltrey, Townshend and Entwistle resumed touring as the Who full-time, with the line-up now cut back down to a five-piece with Starkey on drums and Bundrick on keyboards. The first show in Las Vegas at the MGM Grand Garden Arena was partially broadcast on TV and the Internet and released as the DVD The Vegas Job. They then performed acoustic shows at Neil Young's Bridge School Benefit at the Shoreline Amphitheatre in Mountain View, California, followed by gigs at the House of Blues in Chicago and two Christmas charity shows at the Shepherd's Bush Empire in London. Critics were delighted to see a rejuvenated band with a basic line-up comparable to the tours of the 1960s and 1970s. Andy Greene in Rolling Stone called the 1999 tour better than the final one with Moon in 1976.

The band toured the US and UK from June to October 2000, to generally favourable reviews, culminating in a charity show at the Royal Albert Hall for the Teenage Cancer Trust with guest performances from Paul Weller, Eddie Vedder, Noel Gallagher, Bryan Adams and Nigel Kennedy. Stephen Tomas Erlewine described the gig as "an exceptional reunion concert". In October 2001 the band performed at The Concert for New York City at Madison Square Garden for families of firefighters and police who had lost their lives following the September 11 attacks on the World Trade Center; with Forbes describing their performance as a "catharsis" for the law enforcement in attendance. Earlier that year the band were honoured with a Grammy Lifetime Achievement Award.

The Who played concerts in the UK in early 2002 in preparation for a full US tour. On 27 June, the day before the first date, Entwistle, 57, was found dead of a heart attack at the Hard Rock Hotel in Las Vegas. Cocaine was a contributing factor.

==== Endless Wire ====
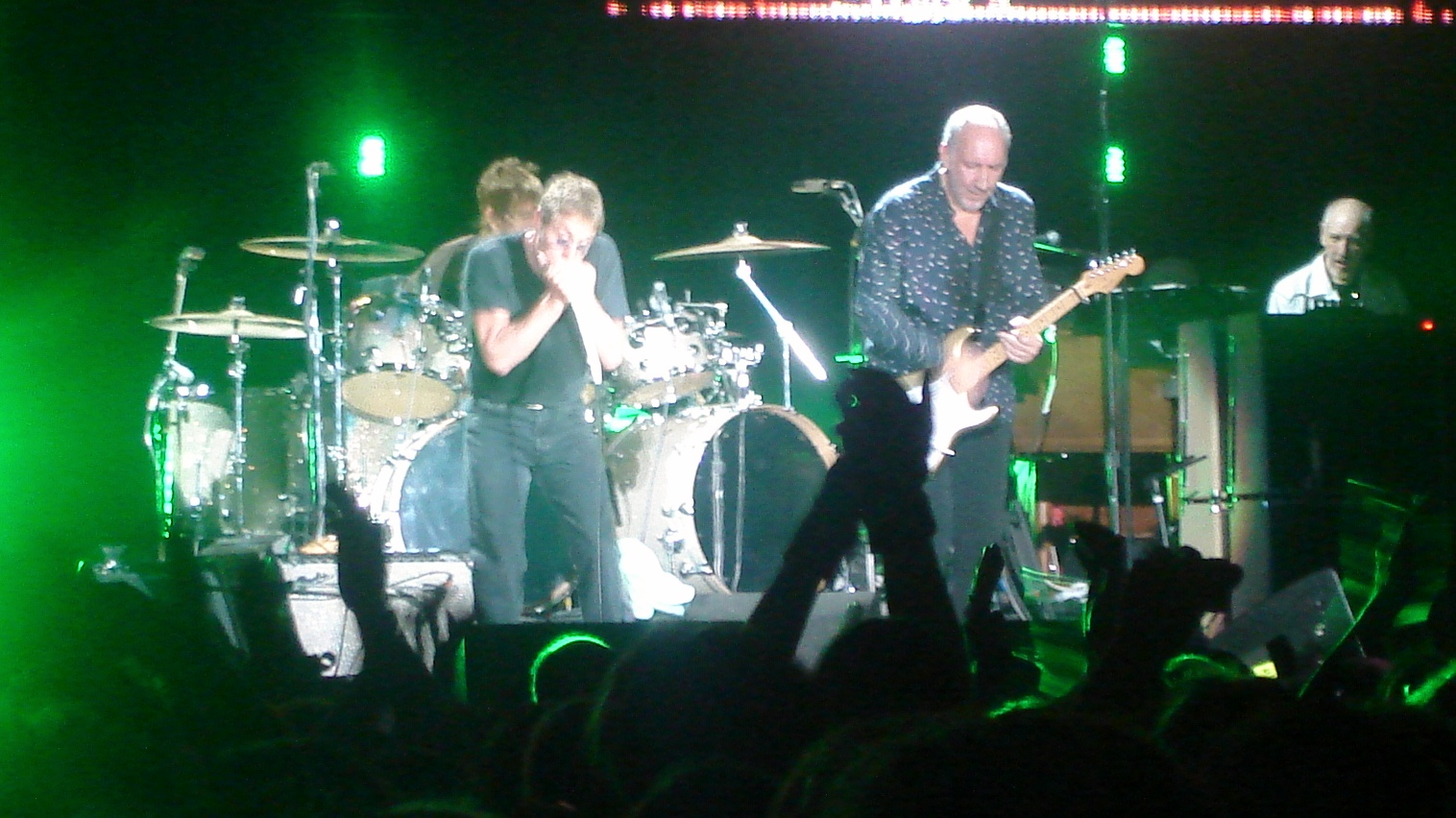
The Who on tour in 2007. From left: Zak Starkey, Daltrey, Townshend, and John "Rabbit" Bundrick.

Entwistle's son, Christopher, gave a statement supporting the Who's decision to carry on. The US tour began at the Hollywood Bowl with touring bassist Pino Palladino. Townshend dedicated the show to Entwistle, and ended with a montage of pictures of him. The tour lasted until September. The loss of a founding member of the Who caused Townshend to re-evaluate his relationship with Daltrey, which had been strained over the band's career. He decided their friendship was important, and this ultimately led to writing and recording new material.

To combat bootlegging, in 2002 the band began to release the Encore Series of official soundboard recordings via themusic.com. An official statement read: "to satisfy this demand they have agreed to release their own official recordings to benefit worthy causes". In 2004, the Who released "Old Red Wine" and "Real Good Looking Boy" (with Palladino and Greg Lake, respectively, on bass guitar) on a singles anthology, The Who: Then and Now, and went on an 18-date tour of Japan, Australia, the UK and the US, including a return appearance at the Isle of Wight. Later that year, Rolling Stone ranked the Who No. 29 on their list of the 100 Greatest Artists of All Time.

The Who announced in 2005 that they were working on a new album. Townshend posted a novella called The Boy Who Heard Music on his blog, which developed into a mini-opera called Wire & Glass, forming the basis for the album. Endless Wire, released in 2006, was the first full studio album of new material since 1982's It's Hard and contained the band's first mini-opera since "Rael" in 1967. The album reached No. 7 in the US and No. 9 in the UK. Starkey was invited to join Oasis in April 2006 and the Who in November 2006, but he declined and split his time between the two.

In November 2007, the documentary Amazing Journey: The Story of the Who was released, featuring unreleased footage of the 1970 Leeds appearance and a 1964 performance at the Railway Hotel when the group were the High Numbers. Amazing Journey was nominated for a 2009 Grammy Award.

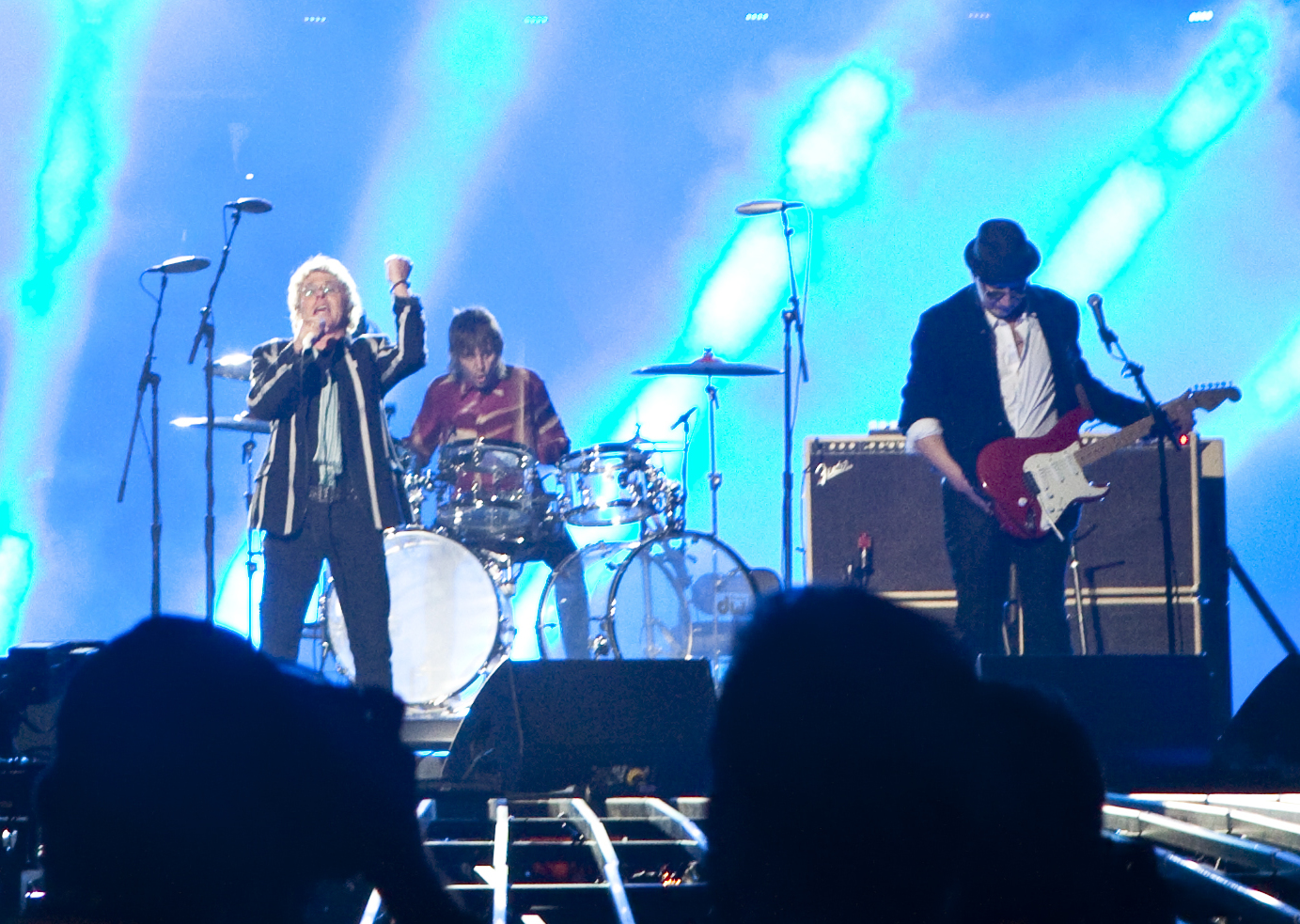
The Who performing the 2010 Super Bowl halftime show.

The Who toured in support of Endless Wire, including the BBC Electric Proms at the Roundhouse in London in 2006, headlining the 2007 Glastonbury Festival, a half-time appearance at the Super Bowl XLIV in 2010 and being the final act at the closing ceremony of the London 2012 Olympic Games. In November 2012, the Who released Live at Hull, an album of the band's performance the night after the Live at Leeds gig.

==== Quadrophenia and More tour ====
In 2010, the Who performed Quadrophenia with parts played by Vedder and Tom Meighan at the Royal Albert Hall as part of the Teenage Cancer Trust series of 10 gigs. A planned tour for early 2010 was jeopardised by the return of Townshend's tinnitus. He experimented with an in-ear monitoring system that was recommended by Neil Young and his audiologist.

The Quadrophenia and More tour started in November 2012 in Ottawa with keyboardists John Corey, Loren Gold and Frank Simes, the last of whom was also musical director. In February 2013, Starkey pulled a tendon and was replaced for a gig by Scott Devours, who performed with less than four hours' notice. The tour moved to Europe and the UK, and ended at the Wembley Arena in July 2013.

==== Continued touring and Who ====
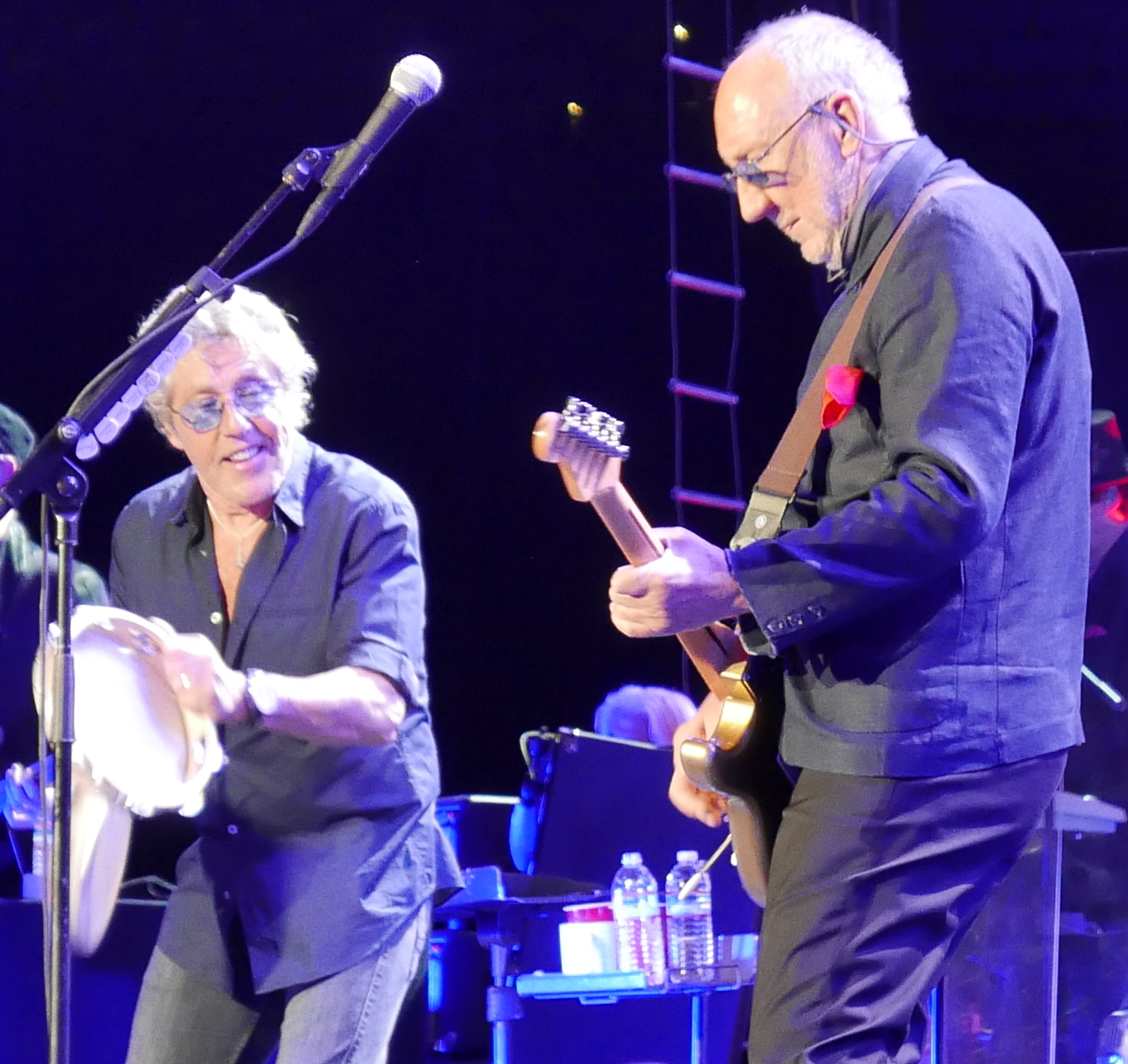
Daltrey and Townshend on The Who Hits 50! tour in 2016.

In October 2013, Townshend announced the Who would stage their final tour in 2015, performing in locations they have never played before. Daltrey clarified that the tour was unrelated to the band's 50th anniversary and indicated that he and Townshend were considering recording new material. Daltrey stated, "We can't go on touring forever ... it could be open-ended, but it will have a finality to it".

Kenney Jones reunited with the Who in June 2014 at a charity gig for Prostate Cancer UK in his Hurtwood Polo Club, alongside Jeff Beck, Procol Harum and Mike Rutherford. Later that month, the Who announced plans for a world tour with a possible accompanying album. In September, the Who released the song "Be Lucky", which was included on the compilation The Who Hits 50! in October. That November, the group released a virtual reality app co-designed by Daltrey's son, Jamie, featuring events and images from the band's history.

The Who headlined 2015's Hyde Park Festival in June, and two days later, the Glastonbury Festival. Townshend suggested to Mojo that it could be the group's last UK gig. To coincide with the Who's 50th anniversary, all studio albums, and the new compilation The Who Hits 50!, were reissued on vinyl. In September 2015, all remaining US tour dates were cancelled after Daltrey contracted viral meningitis. Then Townshend promised the band would come back "stronger than ever".

The Who embarked on the Back to the Who Tour 51! in 2016, a continuation of the previous year's tour. This included a return visit to the Isle of Wight Festival (at the Seaclose Park in Newport) on 11 June opening date. After 13 concerts, it concluded with a performance at the Desert Trip festival at the Empire Polo Club in Indio, California on 16 October. In November, the Who announced that five UK dates the following April (previously scheduled for that August and September) would include a full live performance of Tommy. The five-date tour was renamed "2017 Tommy & More" and included the largest selections from the album since 1989. Two preliminary concerts at the Royal Albert Hall for the Teenage Cancer Trust on 30 March and 1 April featured Tommy in full.

In January 2019, the band announced the Moving On! Tour, followed by their first studio album in thirteen years, Who, to critical and commercial success.

==== Final tours ====
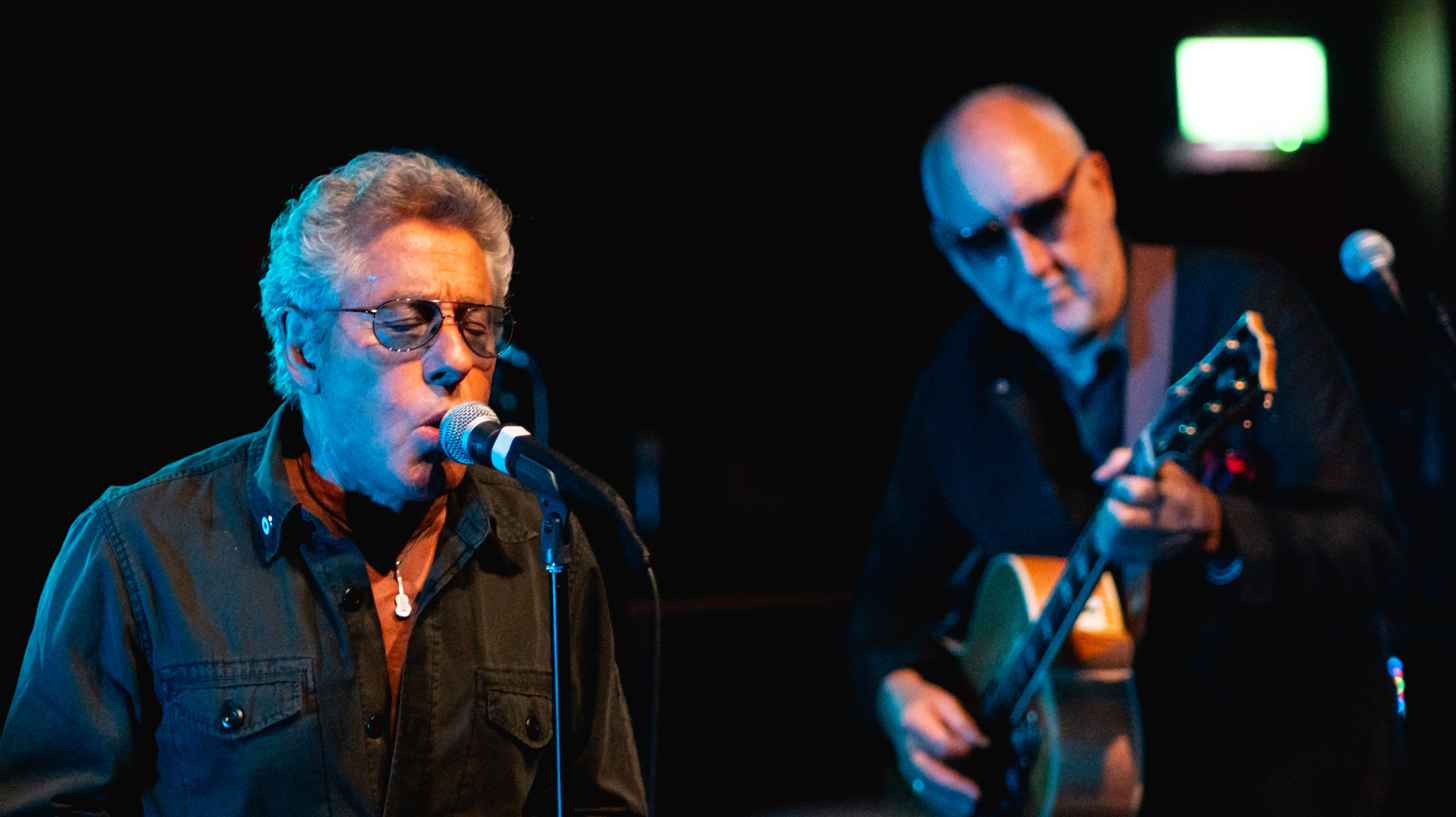
The Who performing in February 2020.

In February 2022, the band announced they would embark on a new North American tour entitled the Who Hits Back beginning 22 April 2022 in Hollywood, Florida and concluding 5 November 2022 in Las Vegas, Nevada. Shortly afterwards, Starkey left the band after a dispute over his playing style at a Royal Albert Hall gig. Starkey stated that he was "surprised and saddened anyone would have an issue with my performance that night" but that he would "remain their biggest fan". However, Townshend clarified a few days later that there had been a miscommunication and that Starkey would remain in the group. The band announced their North American tour in mid-2025 would be their last.

Starkey was fired in May 2025, to be replaced by Scott Devours (who had played in Daltrey's solo touring band) for the remainder of the year; Starkey remarked he had been fired. The band released a formal announcement reiterating their upcoming retirement and that Starkey "needs to devote all his energy" towards his other projects. In August 2026, Daltrey revealed to the audience at a solo show in Las Vegas that the Who had recently rehearsed with Starkey for a possible European leg of the farewell tour, with Starkey later confirming Daltrey's comments.

== Musical style and equipment ==
"The music of The Who can only be called rock & roll ... it is neither derivative of folk music nor the blues; the primary influence is rock & roll itself."

— Jann Wenner

The Who are primarily a rock band, yet have taken influence from other styles of music throughout their career. The original group played a mixture of trad jazz and contemporary pop hits as the Detours, and R&B in 1963. They moved to a mod sound the following year, particularly after hearing the Small Faces fuse Motown with a harsher R&B sound. The group's early work was geared towards singles, though it was not straightforward pop. Music journalist Phil Smee has referred to some of the Who's work from this period, such as "The Ox", as freakbeat, a retrospective label describing intense and raw rock in the transition from British beat to psychedelia. In 1967, Townshend coined the term "power pop" to describe the Who's style. Like their contemporaries, the group were influenced by the arrival of Hendrix, particularly after the Who and the Experience met at Monterey. This and lengthy touring strengthened the band's sound. In the studio, they began to develop softer pieces, particularly from Tommy onwards, and turned their attention towards albums more than singles.

"Won't Get Fooled Again"
The closing section of "Won't Get Fooled Again" merges Townshend's synthesised organ with power chords, Moon's drum fills and "the greatest scream of a career".

From the early 1970s, the band's sound turned more to art rock and hard rock, including epic compositions and synthesisers, particularly on Who's Next and Quadrophenia. Although groups had used synthesisers before, the Who were one of the first to integrate the sound into a basic rock structure. In By Numbers the group's style had scaled back to more standard rock, but synthesisers regained prominence on Face Dances.

Townshend and Entwistle were instrumental in making extreme volumes and distortion standard rock practices. The Who were early adopters of Marshall Amplification. Entwistle was the first member to get two 4×12 speaker cabinets, quickly followed by Townshend. The group used feedback as part of their guitar sound, both live and in the studio. In 1967, Townshend changed to using Sound City amplifiers, customised by Dave Reeves, then in 1970 to Hiwatt. The group were the first to use 1000-watt PA systems for live gigs, which led to competition from bands such as the Rolling Stones and Pink Floyd.

Throughout their careers, the members of the Who have said their live sound has never been captured as they wished on record. Live gigs and the audience have always been important to the group. "Irish" Jack Lyons said, "The Who weren't a joke, they were fucking real, and so were we".

=== Vocals ===
Daltrey initially based his style on Motown and rock and roll, but from Tommy onwards he tackled a wider range of styles. His trademark sound with the band, as noted in 1983, has been a characteristic scream, as heard at the end of "Won't Get Fooled Again".

Group backing vocals are prominent in the Who. After "I Can't Explain" used session men for backing vocals, Townshend and Entwistle resolved to do better themselves on subsequent releases, producing strong backing harmonies. Daltrey, Townshend and Entwistle sang lead on various songs, and occasionally Moon joined in. Who's Next featured Daltrey and Townshend sharing the lead vocals on several songs, and biographer Dave Marsh considers the contrast between Daltrey's strong, guttural tone and Townshend's higher and gentler sound to be one of the album's highlights.

Daltrey's voice is negatively affected by marijuana smoke, to which he says he is allergic. On 20 May 2015, during a Who concert at Nassau Coliseum, he smelled a joint burning and told the smoker to put it out or "the show will be over". The fan obliged, without taking Pete Townshend's advice that "the quickest way" to extinguish a joint is "up your fucking arse".

=== Guitars ===
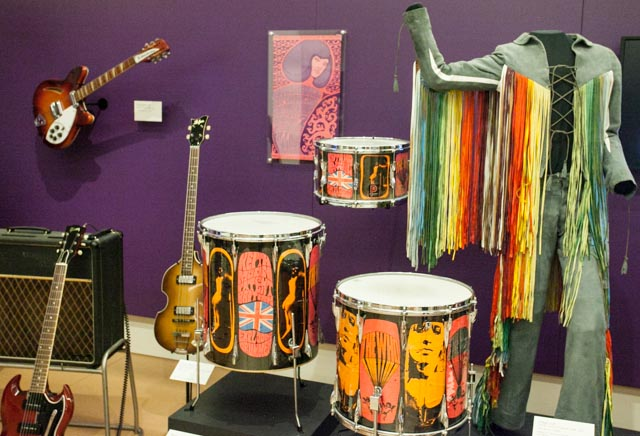
A selection of instruments used by the Who, including a Rickenbacker and Gibson SG Special guitar, and Moon's "Pictures of Lily" drum kit from Premier

Townshend considered himself less technical than guitarists such as Eric Clapton and Jeff Beck and wanted to stand out visually instead. His playing style evolved from the banjo, favouring down strokes and using a combination of the plectrum and fingerpicking. His rhythm playing frequently used seventh chords and suspended fourths, and he is associated with the power chord, an easy-to-finger chord built from the root and fifth that has since become a fundamental part of the rock guitar vocabulary. Townshend also produced noises by manipulating controls on his guitar and by allowing the instrument to feedback.

In the group's early career, Townshend favoured Rickenbacker guitars as they allowed him to fret rhythm guitar chords easily and move the neck back and forwards to create vibrato. From 1968 to 1973, he favoured a Gibson SG Special live, and later used customised Les Pauls in different tunings.

"Pinball Wizard"
The opening of "Pinball Wizard" demonstrates Townshend's acoustic guitar with a flamenco influence.

In the studio for Who's Next and thereafter, Townshend used a 1959 Gretsch 6120 Chet Atkins hollow-body guitar, a Fender Bandmaster amp and an Edwards volume pedal, all gifts from Joe Walsh. Townshend started his career with an acoustic guitar and has regularly recorded and written with a Gibson J-200.

=== Bass ===
A distinctive part of the original band's sound was Entwistle's lead bass playing, while Townshend concentrated on rhythm and chords. Entwistle's was the first popular use of Rotosound strings in 1966, trying to find a piano-like sound. His bassline on "Pinball Wizard" was described by Who biographer John Atkins as "a contribution of its own without diminishing the guitar lines"; he described his part on "The Real Me" from Quadrophenia, recorded in one take, as "a bass solo with vocals". Entwistle's basses include a "Frankenstein" assembled from five Fender Precision and Jazz basses, and Warwick, Alembic, and Status Graphite basses.

=== Drums ===
Moon further strengthened the reversal of traditional rock instrumentation by playing lead parts on his drums. His style was at odds with British rock contemporaries such as the Kinks' Mick Avory and the Shadows' Brian Bennett, who did not consider tom-toms necessary for rock music. Moon used Premier kits starting in 1966. He avoided the hi-hat, and concentrated on a mix of tom rolls and cymbals.

Jones' concise, supportive drumming style was in sharp contrast to Moon's. The Who were initially enthusiastic about working with a completely different drummer. Townshend later stated, "we've never really been able to replace Keith" and Daltrey ultimately believed Jones was not right for the band, while still speaking highly of him as a friend and drummer. Starkey knew Moon from childhood and Moon gave him his first drum kit.

Starkey has been praised for his playing style which echoes Moon's without being a copy.

=== Lyrics ===
Townshend focused on writing meaningful lyrics, inspired by Bob Dylan, whose words dealt with subjects other than boy–girl relationships that were common in rock. Townshend also cited the inspiration of Ray Davies of the Kinks for inventing "a new kind of poetry and a new kind of language for pop writing that influenced me from the very, very, very beginning". Early material focused on the frustration and anxiety shared by mod audiences, which Townshend said was a result of "searching for [his] niche". By The Who Sell Out, he began to work narrative and characters into songs, which he fully developed by Tommy, including spiritual themes influenced by Baba. From the mid-1970s onwards, his songs tended to be more personal, which influenced his decision to go solo.

Entwistle's songs, by contrast, typically feature black humour and darker themes. His two contributions to Tommy ("Cousin Kevin" and "Fiddle About") appeared because Townshend did not believe he could write songs as "nasty" as Entwistle's.

== Personal relationships ==
"We're not mates at all."

— Roger Daltrey, 1965

"I just couldn't get through to Pete and Roger. We have absolutely nothing in common apart from music."

— Keith Moon, 1965

The Who are perceived as having had a poor working relationship. In the original band, Doug Sandom acted as the peacemaker and settled disputes. Moon, by contrast, was as volatile as Daltrey and Townshend. Entwistle was too passive to become involved in arguments. The group established their live reputation and stage show in part out of insecurity and aggression amongst its members, and Townshend recalled that all decisions had to be made democratically "because we always disagreed".

The only genuine friendship in the band during the 1960s was between Entwistle and Moon. The pair enjoyed each other's sense of humour and shared a fondness for clubbing. Journalist Richard Green noted a "chemistry of playfullness that would go beyond playfullness". Their relationship diminished somewhat when Entwistle got married in 1967, though they still socialised on tour. When Moon was destroying toilets in hotels, Entwistle admitted he "was standing behind him with the matches".

The group regularly argued in the press, though Townshend said disputes were amplified in print and the group simply found it difficult to agree on things. Tommy mutually benefitted Townshend and Daltrey's standing in the band because of the former's songwriting and the latter's stage presence, yet even this did not make them close friends. The pair quarrelled, particularly in the mid-1970s, over the group's direction. During his time with the band, Jones was subject to intermittent criticism from Daltrey.

Entwistle's death in 2002 came as a shock to both Townshend and Daltrey, and caused them to re-evaluate their relationship. Townshend has said that he and Daltrey have since become close friends. In 2015, Townshend confirmed their friendship was still strong, adding their acceptance of each other's differences "brought us to a really genuine and compassionate relationship, which can only be described as love".

== Legacy ==
"The one thing that disgusts me about The Who is the way they smashed through every door in the uncharted hallway of rock 'n' roll without leaving much more than some debris for the rest of us to lay claim to."

— Eddie Vedder

The Who are considered one of the most influential rock bands of the 20th century. Their appearances at Monterey and Woodstock helped give them a reputation as one of the greatest live rock acts and they have been credited with originating the "rock opera".

The group's contributions to rock include "perfecting the power chord", windmill strum and the use of non-musical instrument noise such as feedback. The band influenced fashion from their earliest days with their embrace of pop art and the use of the Union Jack for clothing. The guitar-smashing incident at the Railway Hotel in 1964 is one of Rolling Stone magazine's "50 Moments That Changed the History of Rock 'n' Roll".

The Who's mod roundel

Pink Floyd began to use feedback from their early shows in 1966, inspired by the Who, whom they considered a formative influence. Shortly after arriving in London in 1966, Jimi Hendrix visited Marshall's music shop demanding an amp setup like Townshend's and manipulated electronic noises in ways that Townshend had pioneered. The Beatles were fans and socialised with Moon in particular during the mid-1960s. In 1965, Paul McCartney said the Who "are the most exciting thing around" and was inspired to write "Helter Skelter" in the group's "heavy" style; John Lennon borrowed the acoustic guitar style in "Pinball Wizard" for "Polythene Pam". Ramones guitarist Johnny Ramone has stated that the Who was what first inspired him to make music and named their debut as one of his favorite albums.

The loud volume of the band's live show influenced the approach of hard rock and heavy metal. A wide variety of proto-punk, punk rock, and alternative rock bands such as the MC5, the Stooges, the Sex Pistols, the Clash, Pearl Jam frontman Eddie Vedder, Green Day frontman Billie Joe Armstrong, and Melvins cite the Who as an influence. An early influence on Queen, guitarist Brian May referred to the Who as being "among our favourite groups". The Who inspired mod revival bands, particularly the Jam, which helped other groups influenced by the Who become popular. The Who influenced hard rock bands such as Guns N' Roses. In the mid-1990s, Britpop bands such as Blur and Oasis were influenced by the Who. The Who have also influenced pop rock band Panic! at the Disco.

The Who have inspired many tribute bands; Daltrey has endorsed the Whodlums, who raise money for the Teenage Cancer Trust. Many bands have covered Who songs; Elton John's version of "Pinball Wizard" reached No. 7 in the UK.

=== Media ===
During the Who's hiatuses in the 1980s and 90s, Townshend developed his skills as a music publisher to be financially successful from the Who without recording or touring. He countered criticism of "selling out" by saying that licensing the songs to other media allows a wider exposure and widens the group's appeal.

The American police procedural franchise CSI (CSI: Crime Scene Investigation, CSI: Miami, CSI: NY, CSI: Cyber and CSI: Vegas) feature Who songs as theme music, "Who Are You", "Won't Get Fooled Again", "Baba O'Riley" and "I Can See for Miles" respectively. The group's songs have featured in other popular TV series such as The Simpsons, and Top Gear, which had an episode where the presenters were tasked with being roadies for the band.

Rock-oriented films such as Almost Famous, School of Rock and Tenacious D in the Pick of Destiny refer to the band and feature their songs, and other films have used the band's material in their soundtracks, including Apollo 13 (which used "I Can See For Miles") and Austin Powers: The Spy Who Shagged Me (which used a take of "My Generation" recorded for the BBC). Several of the band's tracks have appeared in the video game Rock Band and its sequels.

=== Awards and nominations ===
The Who have received many awards and accolades from the music industry for their recordings and their influence. They received Lifetime Achievement Awards from the British Phonographic Industry in 1988, and from the Grammy Foundation in 2001.

The band were inducted into the Rock and Roll Hall of Fame in 1990 where their display describes them as "prime contenders, in the minds of many, for the title of World's Greatest Rock Band", and the UK Music Hall of Fame in 2005.

The single "My Generation" and the albums Tommy and Who's Next have each been inducted into the Grammy Hall of Fame. In 2008, Pete Townshend and Roger Daltrey received Kennedy Center Honors as members of the Who. In 2009, My Generation was selected for preservation in the United States National Recording Registry.

In 2003, Rolling Stone's 500 Greatest Albums of All Time list included Who's Next at number 28, Tommy at number 96, The Who Sell Out at number 113, Live at Leeds at number 170, My Generation at number 236, Quadrophenia at number 266, and A Quick One at number 383. And in 2004, on their 500 Greatest Songs of All Time list, Rolling Stone included "My Generation" at number 11, "Won't Get Fooled Again" at number 133, "I Can See for Miles" at number 258, "Baba O'Riley" at number 340, and "I Can't Explain" at number 371. They ranked them the 29th greatest artist of all time. Eddie Vedder wrote in appeciation:

The Who began as spectacle. They became spectacular. Early on, the band was in pure demolition mode; later, on albums like Tommy and Quadrophenia, it coupled that raw energy with precision and desire to complete musical experiments on a grand scale. They asked, "What were the limits of rock & roll? Could the power of music actually change the way you feel?" Pete Townshend demanded that there be spiritual value in music. They were an incredible band whose main songwriter happened to be on a quest for reason and harmony in his life. He shared that journey with the listener, becoming an inspiration for others to seek out their own path. They did all this while also being in the Guinness Book of World Records as the world's loudest band... For myself and so many others (including shopkeepers, foremen, professionals, bellboys, gravediggers, directors, musicians), they won't be replaced. Yes, Pete, it's true, music can change you.

== Band members ==
=== Current members ===
- Roger Daltrey – lead and backing vocals, rhythm guitar, harmonica, percussion, ukulele (1964–1983, 1985, 1988–1989, 1996–present)
- Pete Townshend – lead and rhythm guitar, backing and lead vocals, keyboards, ARP Synthesizer (1964–1983, 1985, 1988–1989, 1996–present)

=== Former members ===
- John Entwistle – bass guitar, horns, backing and lead vocals (1964–1983, 1985, 1988–1989, 1996–2002; his death)
- Doug Sandom – drums (1964; died 2019)
- Keith Moon – drums, occasional backing or lead vocals (1964–1978; his death)
- Kenney Jones – drums (1978–1983, 1985, 1988)

== Discography ==
- My Generation (1965)
- A Quick One (1966)
- The Who Sell Out (1967)
- Tommy (1969)
- Who's Next (1971)
- Quadrophenia (1973)
- The Who by Numbers (1975)
- Who Are You (1978)
- Face Dances (1981)
- It's Hard (1982)
- Endless Wire (2006)
- Who (2019)

== Tours and performances ==
=== Headlining 1960s–1990s ===
- 1962–1963 performances
- 1967 tour
- Tommy Tour (1969–1970)
- Who's Next Tour (1971–1972)
- Quadrophenia 1973–1974 tour (28 October 1973 – 24 February 1974)
- The Who by Numbers Tour (1975–1976)
- 1979 tour
- 1980 tour
- 1981 tour
- 1982 tour
- 1985 and 1988 reunions
- The Kids Are Alright Tour (1989; 25th anniversary)
- Quadrophenia 96/97 (1996–1997)
- 1999 performances

=== Headlining 2000s–2020s ===
- 2000 tour
- 2001 The Concert for New York City appearance
- 2002 tour
- 2004 tour
- 2005 Live 8 appearance
- 2006–2007 tour
- 2008–2009 tour
- Super Bowl XLIV halftime show
- 2010 performances
- 2011 performances
- Quadrophenia and More (2012–2013)
- The Who Hits 50! (2014–2016)
- Back to the Who Tour 51! (2016)
- 2017 Tommy & More (March – April 2017)
- 2017 tour
- Moving On! Tour (May – October 2019)
- The Who Hits Back! (April 2022 – August 2023)
- The Song Is Over: The North American Farewell Tour (August – September 2025)
