= Back to the Who Tour 51! =

2016 concert tour by the Who

- Tour by The Who
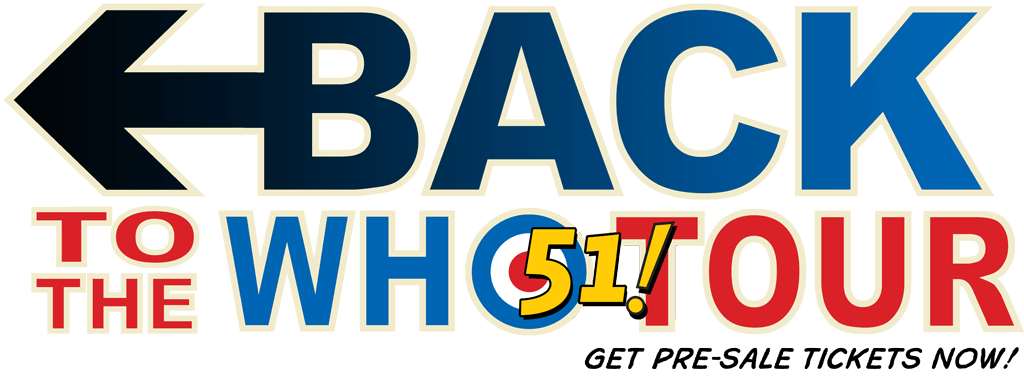
- Back to the Who Tour 51!
- Location: Europe
- Start date: 11 June 2016
- End date: 16 October 2016
- Legs: 2
- No. of shows: 9 in Europe; 4 in North America; 13 in total

The Who concert chronology
- The Who Hits 50! (2014–16); Back to the Who Tour 51! (2016); 2017 Tommy & More (2017)

Back to the Who Tour 51! was a 2016 concert tour of Europe & North America by British band the Who.

== Overview ==
The tour was announced, in part, on 3 May 2016 and is the continuity of the band's previous tour, The Who Hits 50!.

The new tour included a return visit to the Isle of Wight Festival (at the Seaclose Park in Newport, England) on the opening date and ended at the Empire Polo Grounds in Indio, California on 16 October 2016 after thirteen concerts.

== Tour band ==
The Who

- Roger Daltrey – lead vocals, harmonica, acoustic guitar, rhythm guitar, tambourine
- Pete Townshend – lead guitar, acoustic guitar, vocals

Backing musicians

- John Corey – keyboards, backing vocals, percussion, bass harmonica
- Loren Gold – keyboards, backing vocals, percussion, jaw harp
- Pino Palladino – bass guitar
- Frank Simes – keyboards, backing vocals, percussion, banjo, mandolin
- Zak Starkey – drums, percussion
- Simon Townshend – rhythm guitar, acoustic guitar, vocals

== Tour dates ==
The five UK dates scheduled for August / September 2016, originally billed as "Greatest Hits" shows, have been moved to 2017 to coincide with the Royal Albert Hall dates, as part of the 2017 Tommy & More tour.

Date	City	Country	Venue	Tickets sold/available	Box office
Europe 2016
11 June 2016	Newport	United Kingdom	Isle of Wight Festival – Seaclose Park	— (Note: The 11 June 2016 concert in Newport is part of the Isle of Wight Festival.)	
14 June 2016	Toulouse	France	Zénith de Toulouse	—	—
16 June 2016	Madrid	Spain	Caja Mágica	— (Note: The 16 June 2016 concert in Madrid is part of the Mad Cool Festival.)	
18 June 2016	Vitoria-Gasteiz	Spain	Azkena Rock Festival Grounds	— (Note: The 18 June 2016 concert in Vitoria-Gasteiz is part of the Azkena Rock Festival.)	
10 September 2016	Oberhausen	Germany	König Pilsener Arena	—	—
12 September 2016	Stuttgart	Germany	Hanns-Martin-Schleyer-Halle	—	—
14 September 2016	Vienna	Austria	Wiener Stadthalle	—	—
17 September 2016	Bologna	Italy	Unipol Arena	—	—
19 September 2016	Milan	Italy	Mediolanum Forum	—	—
North America 2016
6 October 2016	Santa Barbara	United States	Santa Barbara Bowl	--	--
9 October 2016	Indio	United States	Empire Polo Grounds	--	--
12 October 2016	Mexico City	Mexico	Palacio de los Deportes	17,837 / 18,423	$1,257,668
16 October 2016	Indio	United States	Empire Polo Grounds	--	--

== Cancelled shows ==
Date	City	Country	Venue
29 August 2016	Glasgow	United Kingdom	The SSE Hydro
31 August 2016	Manchester	United Kingdom	Manchester Arena
3 September 2016	Sheffield	United Kingdom	Sheffield Arena
5 September 2016	Birmingham	United Kingdom	Genting Arena
7 September 2016	Liverpool	United Kingdom	Echo Arena Liverpool
