= 2017 Tommy & More =

2017 concert tour by the Who

- Tour by The Who
- Location: Europe
- Start date: 30 March 2017
- End date: 12 April 2017
- Legs: 1
- No. of shows: 7

The Who concert chronology
- Back to the Who Tour 51! (2016); 2017 Tommy & More (2017); The Who Tour 2017 (2017)

2017 Tommy & More was a United Kingdom 7-date concert tour by British band the Who. The first two nights saw the band performing live in its entirety their 1969 studio album Tommy along with a few classics, with the rest of the tour featuring an extended Tommy set as a centerpiece to an otherwise greatest hits show.

== Tour band ==
The Who

- Roger Daltrey – lead vocals, harmonica, acoustic guitar, tambourine
- Pete Townshend – lead guitar, acoustic guitar, vocals

Backing musicians

- Zak Starkey – drums, percussion
- Simon Townshend – rhythm guitar, acoustic guitar, vocals
- Jon Button – bass guitar
- Frank Simes – keyboards, backing vocals, percussion, banjo, mandolin
- John Corey – keyboards, backing vocals, percussion, bass harmonica
- Loren Gold – keyboards, backing vocals, jaw harp

== Set list ==
=== Show on 30 March 2017 at the Royal Albert Hall ===
This set list is representative of the Teenage Cancer Trust Benefit performance on 30 March 2017 at the Royal Albert Hall, London, UK. (Note: This 30 March 2017 Who show for The Teenage Cancer Trust was the 100th concert of the series.) It does not represent all concerts for the duration of the tour.

1. "I Can't Explain"
2. "Substitute"
3. "Overture"
4. "It's a Boy"
5. "1921"
6. "Amazing Journey"
7. "Sparks"
8. "Eyesight to the Blind"
9. "Christmas"
10. "Cousin Kevin"
11. "The Acid Queen"
12. "Do You Think It's Alright?"
13. "Fiddle About"
14. "Pinball Wizard"
15. "There's a Doctor"
16. "Go to the Mirror!"
17. "Tommy Can You Hear Me?"
18. "Smash the Mirror"
19. "Underture"
20. "I'm Free"
21. "Miracle Cure"
22. "Sensation"
23. "Sally Simpson"
24. "Welcome"
25. "Tommy's Holiday Camp"
26. "We're Not Gonna Take It" / "See Me, Feel Me"
27. "Won't Get Fooled Again"
28. "Join Together"
29. "Baba O'Riley"
30. "Who Are You"

=== Show on 1 April 2017 at the Royal Albert Hall ===
This set list is representative of the Teenage Cancer Trust Benefit performance on 1 April 2017 at the Royal Albert Hall, London, UK. It does not represent all concerts for the duration of the tour. This show was officially released on 13 October 2017 as Tommy - Live At The Royal Albert Hall on various formats (2 CD Digipack / 3 Vinyls Gatefold / 1 DVD / 1 Blu-ray).

1. "Overture"
2. "It's a Boy"
3. "1921"
4. "Amazing Journey"
5. "Sparks"
6. "Eyesight to the Blind"
7. "Christmas"
8. "Cousin Kevin"
9. "The Acid Queen"
10. "Do You Think It's Alright?"
11. "Fiddle About"
12. "Pinball Wizard"
13. "There's a Doctor"
14. "Go to the Mirror!"
15. "Tommy Can You Hear Me?"
16. "Smash the Mirror"
17. "Underture"
18. "I'm Free"
19. "Miracle Cure"
20. "Sensation"
21. "Sally Simpson"
22. "Welcome"
23. "Tommy's Holiday Camp"
24. "We're Not Gonna Take It" / "See Me, Feel Me"
25. "I Can't Explain"
26. "Join Together"
27. "I Can See For Miles"
28. "Who Are You"
29. "Love, Reign o'er Me"
30. "Baba O'Riley"
31. "Won't Get Fooled Again"

== Tour dates ==
Date	City	Country	Venue	Tickets Sold/Available	Box Office
Europe 2017
30 March 2017	London	England	Royal Albert Hall (Teenage Cancer Trust performances)	—	—
1 April 2017	London	England	Royal Albert Hall (Teenage Cancer Trust performances)	—	—
3 April 2017	Liverpool	England	Echo Arena Liverpool	—	—
5 April 2017	Manchester	England	Manchester Arena	9,135 / 12,120	$742,931
7 April 2017	Glasgow	Scotland	SSE Hydro	10,801 / 11,121	$899,999
10 April 2017	Sheffield	England	Sheffield Arena	—	—
12 April 2017	Birmingham	England	Genting Arena	—	—
