= List of The Who tours and performances =

Tours by the English rock band

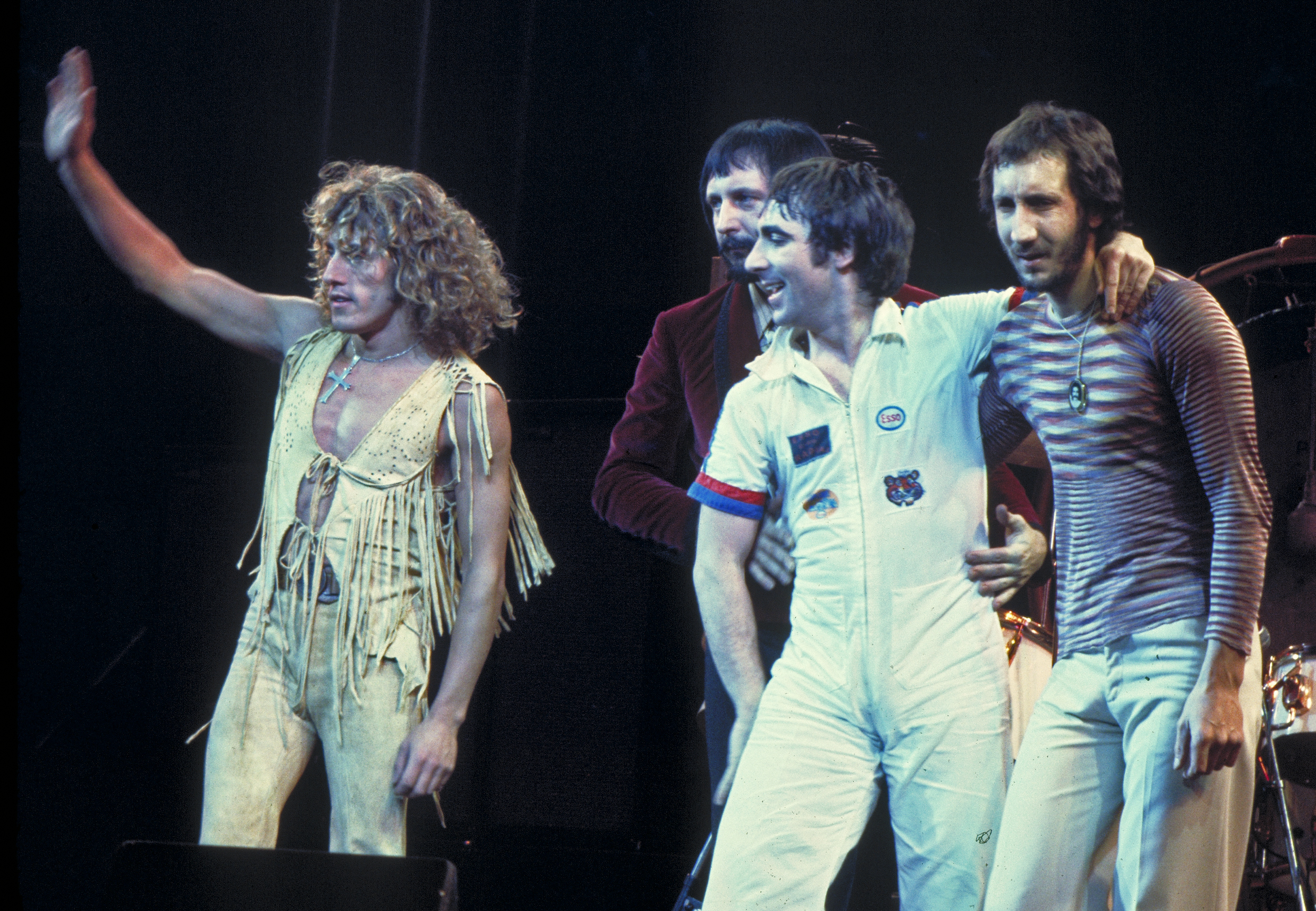
The Who in 1975

The Who are an English rock band, whose most commercially successful line-up was Roger Daltrey, Pete Townshend, John Entwistle and Keith Moon. Originally known as the Detours, the group performed with varying personnel in and around the London area until 1964, when Moon joined. They continued to perform exclusively in Europe until their first American tour in 1967.

The group's fourth album, the rock opera Tommy (1969) was a critical and commercial success. The Who played the rock opera live from 1969 to 1970, which elevated the band's critical standing. Their fifth album, Who's Next followed a series of free concerts at the Young Vic, London. They continued to tour to large audiences before taking a hiatus from live performances at the end of 1976.

In 1978, Moon died of a drug overdose, and the band, backed with drummer Kenney Jones and keyboardist John "Rabbit" Bundrick, toured 1979 and 1980 supporting their album Who Are You. After a successful tour in 1982, the band broke up. Following two reunion gigs in 1985 (for Live Aid) and 1988, the band toured in 1989 with an expanded line-up. The band officially reunited in 1996, starting with a two-year retrospective tour of Quadrophenia. After the death of Entwistle in 2002, Townshend and Daltrey continued as the Who, releasing two new albums in 2006 and 2019 respectively and continued touring.

== Early performances ==
By 1962, the founding members of the Who (Daltrey, Townshend and Entwistle) were playing in the Detours regularly around West London. The following February, they began a Monday night residency at the White Hart Hotel in Acton and also started playing regularly at the Oldfield Hotel in Greenford. By the end of 1963, they had started to support major groups, including an opening slot for The Rolling Stones at St Mary's Hall, Putney on 22 December.

On 2 May 1964, Moon played his first gig with the band in a pub on the North Circular Road. That June, the group started a residency at the Railway Hotel, Harrow, which is where managers Kit Lambert and Chris Stamp first met them. Some footage of an early appearance at the Railway was later used for the film The Kids Are Alright.

== Marquee and national tours ==
On 24 November 1964, the Who began a Tuesday night residency at the Marquee, which established their national reputation. Over the course of the following sixteen weeks, they broke attendance records in the club, and were booked for a further seven. Following chart success of "I Can't Explain", the Who began to tour nationwide. On 6 August 1965, the group played a major gig at the fifth National Jazz and Blues Festival in Richmond. They played their first concerts outside the UK in September 1965, touring the Netherlands and Scandinavia. Immediately afterwards, Daltrey was fired from the group, but re-hired three days later as too many gigs were booked ahead.

They continued to gig continually around the UK through 1966, and underwent a second Scandinavian tour that October. The group's debts, caused by regular destruction of their musical gear, meant that they needed to spend most of the time touring. In January 1967, the group played the Saville Theatre for the first time, on the same bill as Jimi Hendrix. They played their first tour of Italy the following month.

== First American tours ==
On 25 March 1967, the Who played their first concerts in the US as part of the Fifth Dimension package tour at the RKO 58th Street Theater, New York. The group played five shows a day for nine days, running to a tight schedule with only two songs in their set. They toured West Germany in April, followed by a short Scandinavian tour.

In June, the Who began their first tour in the United States. They played their first concert at the Fillmore Auditorium, San Francisco on 16 June. Two days later, they played their first major performance in the country at the Monterey Pop Festival. The Who argued backstage with Hendrix about the running order, before agreeing to go on first following a coin toss. Their performance, which included Townshend destroying a Fender Stratocaster and Moon kicking over his drum kit, was filmed by D.A. Pennebaker. The following month, the group began a coast-to-coast US tour with Herman's Hermits, which included a notorious after-party show in Flint, Michigan on 23 August (Moon's 21st birthday).

In October, the Who began a tour of British theatres. However, the opening shows descended into violence after the group overran their stage time, causing the curtain to come down on them. A two-week tour of the US began in November, which including a performance at Union Catholic High School in New Jersey on 29 November. The group spent the rest of 1967 playing sporadic gigs in the UK.

The Who toured Australia and New Zealand in January 1968, along with the Small Faces. However, the shows were a disaster, with both groups getting mocked by the local press and the bands trashing their hotel rooms. After an incident that took place on a flight to Sydney, the band were briefly arrested in Melbourne and then forced to leave the country; Prime Minister John Gorton sent a telegram to The Who telling them never to return to Australia. The Who would not return to Australia again until 2004. The group spent much of the rest of the year on the road, including two lengthy US tours. A final package tour with the Small Faces, Joe Cocker and The Crazy World of Arthur Brown took place in November, and on 10 December, the group made a guest appearance on the television special, The Rolling Stones Rock and Roll Circus, which was subsequently shelved by the Stones.

== Tommy Tour ==
The Who spent the start of 1969 sporadically gigging the UK in between recording the rock opera Tommy. They began rehearsing a live performance of the rock opera at Hanwell Community Centre on 1 April, where they worked out a running order that could be played live by the group. Daltrey's voice had improved, and the quality of their live shows improved.

The first live performance of Tommy was a press reception at Ronnie Scott's on 1 May 1969. The following day, the group flew out to New York for a US tour, starting at the Grande Ballroom, Detroit. On 17 August, the Who appeared at the Woodstock festival, having been delayed from the previous evening after the show ran late. At the conclusion of "Pinball Wizard", Abbie Hoffman took to the stage to protest about the imprisonment of John Sinclair before being kicked offstage by Townshend, while during "See Me, Feel Me", the sun rose, almost as if on cue. Two weeks later, the group played the second Isle of Wight Festival, using one of the largest live PAs available. In October 1969, the Who played six shows at the Fillmore East, where Leonard Bernstein praised them for their new music. The group's show on 14 December at the London Coliseum was filmed for a possible future Tommy feature. The group made a second trip to the Isle of Wight, appearing at the 1970 festival on 29 August, before an audience of 600,000. The last live performance for 1970 was at The Roundhouse, London on 20 December. Townshend said "This is the very last time we'll play Tommy on stage", to which Moon promptly cried, "Thank Christ for that!"

== Who's Next Tour ==
The Who held a press conference on 13 January 1971, explaining that they would be giving a series of concerts at the Young Vic theatre, where they would develop the fictional elements of the proposed film along with the audience. After Keith Moon had completed his work on the film 200 Motels, the group performed their first Young Vic concert on 15 February. The show included a new quadrophonic public address system which cost £30,000; the audience was mainly invited from various organisations such as youth clubs, with only a few tickets on sale to the general public. The group gave a further series of concerts at the Young Vic on 25 and 26 April, which were recorded on the Rolling Stones Mobile Studio by Andy Johns, but Townshend grew disillusioned with Lifehouse and further shows were cancelled.

The Who starting touring the US in July 1971, just before Who's Next was released. The set list was revamped, and while it included a smaller selection of numbers from Tommy, several new numbers from the new album such as "My Wife", "Baba O'Riley" and "Won't Get Fooled Again" became live favourites. The latter two songs involved the band playing to a backing track containing the synthesizer parts. The tour moved to the UK in September, including a show at The Oval, Kennington in front of 35,000 fans, and the opening gig at the Rainbow Theatre in Finsbury Park, before going back to the US, ending in Seattle on 15 December. The group then took eight months off touring, the longest break of their career at that point.

The Who resumed touring on 11 August 1972 in Frankfurt, West Germany as part of a European tour, which was the first time they had played together for several months. The only gig for the first half of 1973 was on 10 March at The Hague.

== Quadrophenia Tour ==
The Who wanted to play Quadrophenia live, but would not be able to play all the instruments on the album on stage. Townshend wanted Chris Stainton to accompany them as a touring keyboardist, but Daltrey objected. They decided to play along to backing tapes as they had already done for "Baba O'Riley" and "Won't Get Fooled Again". The group only allowed two days rehearsals, one of which was abandoned after Daltrey punched Townshend following an argument.

The tour started on 28 October 1973. The original plan had been to play most of the album, but after the first gig at Stoke-on-Trent, the band dropped the title track, "Cut My Hair", "The Dirty Jobs", "Is It In My Head" and "I've Had Enough" from the set. Both Daltrey and Townshend felt they had to describe the plot in detail to the audience, which took up valuable time on stage. A few shows later in Newcastle upon Tyne, the backing tapes to "5:15" came in late. Townshend stopped the show, grabbed sound engineer Bob Pridden, who was controlling the mixing desk, and dragged him onstage, shouting obscenities at him. Townshend subsequently picked up some of the tapes and threw them over the stage, kicked his amplifier over, and walked off. The band returned 20 minutes later, playing older material. Townshend and Moon appeared on local television the following day and attempted to brush things off. The Who played two other shows in Newcastle without incident.

The US tour started on 20 November at the Cow Palace in San Francisco. The group were nervous about playing Quadrophenia after the British tour, especially Moon. Before the show, he was offered some tranquillisers from a fan. Just after the show started, the fan collapsed and was hospitalised. Moon's playing, meanwhile, became incredibly erratic, particularly during Quadrophenia where he did not seem to be able to keep time with the backing tapes. Towards the end of the show, during "Won't Get Fooled Again", he passed out over his drumkit. After a 20-minute wait, Moon reappeared onstage, but at the end of "Magic Bus", collapsed again, and was immediately taken to hospital. Scot Halpin, an audience member, convinced promoter Bill Graham to let him play drums, and the group closed the show with him, playing a jam of "Smokestack Lightning", "Spoonful" and "Naked Eye". Moon had a day to recover, and by the next show at The Forum, was playing at his usual strength.

The group began to get used to the backing tapes, and the remainder of gigs for the US tour were successful. The tour continued in February 1974, with a short series of gigs in France. The final show at the Palais des Sports de Gerland in Lyon on the 24th was the last time Quadrophenia was played as a stage piece with Moon, who died in 1978. Townshend later said that Daltrey "ended up hating Quadrophenia – probably because it had bitten back".

The Who played a sporadic selection of shows for the rest of 1974. On 18 May, they headlined the "Summer of 74" festival at The Valley in front of an estimated 80,000 people. On 10-11 and 13-14 June, the group played at Madison Square Garden, their first shows in New York in almost three years.

== The Who by Numbers Tour ==
The Who began their "Greatest Rock and Roll Band In The World" tour on 3 October 1975, the same day that The Who By Numbers was released. They toured the UK and Europe before flying to the US in November, and ended the year with three of shows at the Hammersmith Odeon from 21-23 December.

Owing to group debts, the Who spent much of 1976 touring. This included lengthy coast-to-coast trips across the US, playing in large arenas and stadiums, and was the most extensive tour they had undertaken in five years. On 31 May, they headlined the "Who Put The Boot In" festival at The Valley (stadium) in front of 60,000 fans. The concert earned them a world record for the loudest band, with concert volume registering 120 decibels. This was followed by similar shows at Celtic Park, Glasgow and Swansea City Football Ground. The final date of the tour was in Toronto, Canada on 21 October, which was Moon's last public performance.

== The Kids Are Alright concerts ==
After the 1976 concerts, the Who were inactive during the first half of 1977, during which time punk rock became popular, with several punk bands citing the group as an influence. When they reconvened in September to work on The Kids Are Alright, Townshend announced there would be no touring. The only concert played that year was a closed show at the Gaumont State Cinema, Kilburn on 15 December. It was intended to be used for The Kids Are Alright but almost none of the footage appeared in the final cut.

Unhappy with the Gaumont performance, the Who played another show at Shepperton Studios on 25 May 1978 in front of a hand-picked audience of 500. The performances of "Baba O'Riley" and "Won't Get Fooled Again" were used in the finished film. It was the last concert Moon played with the group; he died on 7 September.

== With Kenney Jones ==
Following Moon's death, the Who recruited drummer Kenney Jones and played their first concert together at the Rainbow Theatre on 2 May 1979. They played a number of other shows in the UK and Europe over summer, before beginning a tour of the US in September. On 3 December, at the group's performance at the Riverfront Coliseum, Cincinnati, Ohio, eleven fans died after being crushed in a stampede to get into the stadium. The group continued to tour the US into 1980.

At the start of 1981, the Who played their longest British tour in ten years. In late 1982, they toured the US as the First Farewell Tour, playing their final show in Toronto.

== Concert tours and performances ==
Year	Duration	Shows
1962–1963	July 1962 – 29 December 1963 (England)	166
Then known as the Detours, Roger Daltrey, Pete Townshend, and John Entwistle perform with varying personnel in and around the London area.
1964	2 January 1964 – 31 December 1964 (United Kingdom)	193
The group becomes the Who (and for a short period, the High Numbers), performing strictly in England. In May, drummer Keith Moon joins Daltrey, Townshend, and Entwistle, completing the band's classic lineup. They release their first two singles, "Zoot Suit/I'm the Face" (as the High Numbers) and "I Can't Explain".
1965	1 January 1965 – 24 December 1965 (Europe)	263
The band performed mostly in the United Kingdom, with a few dates in Paris and a short tour of Scandinavia. Supported releases include "Anyway, Anyhow, Anywhere", "My Generation" and the album of the same name.
1966	1 January 1966 – 31 December 1966 (Europe)	222
Performances mostly in the United Kingdom, with various short tours around Continental Europe. Supported releases include "Substitute", "I'm a Boy", My Generation, and A Quick One.
1967	6 January 1967 – 30 December 1967 (Europe, North America)	217
Performances in the United Kingdom and Europe, as well as the band's first trips to North America. Supported releases include "Pictures of Lily", A Quick One, and The Who Sell Out.
1968	1 January 1968 – 21 December 1968 (Worldwide)	156
Dates in the United Kingdom and tours of Australia/New Zealand and North America. Supported releases include The Who Sell Out and "Magic Bus".
1969	18 January 1969 – 19 December 1969 (Europe, North America)	113
Various dates in the United Kingdom and three separate trips to North America; the group also performs its first opera house shows later in the year in support of Tommy.
1970	16 January 1970 – 20 December 1970 (Europe, United States)	74
Opera house dates in Europe, as well as various dates and tours of the United Kingdom and the United States, supporting Tommy. The live album Live at Leeds was recorded in February.
1971	4 January 1971 – 15 December 1971 (United Kingdom, United States)	73
A series of performances at the Young Vic in London for the Lifehouse project, as well as tours of the United Kingdom and the United States supporting Who's Next.
1972	11 August 1972 – 14 September 1972 (Europe)	17
A five-week European tour promoting Who's Next.
1973	10 March 1973 – 23 December 1973 (Europe, North America)	27
One TV live special in the Netherlands early in the year, with tours of England and North America later in the year in support of Quadrophenia.
1974	9 February 1974 – 14 June 1974 (Europe, United States)	15
A tour of France, sporadic dates in England, and four shows in New York, supporting Quadrophenia.
1975	3 October 1975 – 23 December 1975 (Europe, North America)	43
Tours of Europe and North America supporting The Who By Numbers.
1976	27 February 1976 – 21 October 1976 (Europe, North America)	36
Two tours of North America and sporadic dates in the United Kingdom and Europe, supporting The Who By Numbers. The group's last tours with Keith Moon.
1977–1978	15 December 1977 – 25 May 1978 (England)	2
Two special performances in London filmed for The Kids Are Alright documentary, marking Keith Moon's last performances before his death.
1979	2 May 1979 – 28 December 1979 (Europe, United States)	35
New drummer Kenney Jones and keyboardist John "Rabbit" Bundrick joined the band for a brief run of shows throughout Europe in the summer and fall and the New York metro area in September. These shows serve to reestablish the Who as a band. In the late autumn, the band undertake a short tour of the Midwest and Northeast promoting The Kids Are Alright and Quadrophenia films. Eleven fans died prior to a 3 December show in Cincinnati.
1980	26 March 1980 – 16 July 1980 (Europe, North America)	43
European warm-up dates and two tours of North America, supporting Who Are You.
1981	25 January 1981 – 28 March 1981 (Europe)	27
Tour of the United Kingdom and an appearance on the German TV program Rockpalast, supporting Face Dances.
1982	10 September 1982 – 17 December 1982 (England, North America)	42
Two warm-up shows in Birmingham, England, followed by two tours of North America, supporting It's Hard. Tim Gorman serves as the keyboardist for the year, while the group intended at the time for this to be their last tour. The live album Who's Last is recorded in North America.
1985 and 1988	13 July 1985 – 8 February 1988 (England)	2
The band reunited for short performances at Live Aid in 1985 and again for the 1988 BPI Awards, their last appearances with Kenney Jones.
1989	21 June 1989 – 2 November 1989 (North America, England)	50
Reunion tours of North America and England with drummer Simon Phillips and several other supporting musicians and singers, including lead guitarist Steve Bolton. The live album Join Together and part of the Tommy and Quadrophenia Live DVD were recorded.
1996–1997	29 June 1996 – 16 August 1997 (Europe, North America)	72
The group reunites again for a charity show in Hyde Park with drummer Zak Starkey and a number of other support musicians for a full-scale performances of Quadrophenia; tours of North America and Europe followed. Part of the Tommy and Quadrophenia Live DVD was recorded.
1999	29 October 1999 – 31 December 1999 (United States, England)	8
The band played as a five-piece for the first time since 1982, including two acoustic shows for the Bridge School Benefit and two charity shows in Chicago, followed by two Christmas shows in London. The live albums The Vegas Job and Blues to the Bush were recorded.
2000	6 June 2000 – 27 November 2000 (United States, United Kingdom)	38
Tours of the United States and England, the last charity date at the Royal Albert Hall in London was released as a live album and DVD.
2002	27 January 2002 – 28 September 2002 (England, North America)	32
Five shows in England early in the year marked the group's final performances with John Entwistle. A North American tour commenced at the Hollywood Bowl with bassist Pino Palladino a few days after Entwistle's death. The Encore Series 2002 includes all but two shows from the North American tour.
2004	22 March 2004 – 9 August 2004 (Worldwide)	18
A series of dates in the United Kingdom and the United States in addition to the band's first trip to Japan and their first shows in Australia since 1968. Supporting the Then and Now compilation album, which included two new songs. Shows are chronicled in the Encore Series 2004.
2005	11 June 2005 – 2 July 2005 (Europe, North America)	3
Charity acoustic performance in New York and an appearance at Live 8, the latter with bassist Damon Minchella and drummer Steve White filling in for Pino Palladino and Zak Starkey.
2006–2007	7 June 2006 – 1 December 2007 (Europe, North America)	113
Tours of the United Kingdom, Europe, and the United States, supporting Endless Wire. Shows are chronicled in the Encore Series 2006 and 2007
2008–2009	13 April 2008 – 21 May 2009 (Worldwide)	30
Various shows in England and the United States as well as tours of North America, Japan, and New Zealand/Australia.
2010	4 February 2010 – 30 March 2010 (United States, England)	3
The band was the featured act for the Super Bowl XLIV halftime show. They also performed Quadrophenia for their Teenage Cancer Trust concert in London.
2011	13 January 2011 (England)	1
A short performance in London for the Killing Cancer charity.
2012–2013	12 August 2012 – 8 July 2013 (North America, Europe)	52
The Who toured North America for the first time since 2008, (their first appearance in North America since their Super Bowl XLIV performance). They performed Quadrophenia in its entirety, as well as an encore set of Who classics such as "Who Are You", "Behind Blue Eyes", "Pinball Wizard", "The Kids Are Alright", "Baba O'Riley", "Won't Get Fooled Again", and "Tea & Theatre". Daltrey and Townshend were once again joined by drummer Zak Starkey, bassist Pino Palladino, guitarist and vocalist Simon Townshend, as well as first-time touring members Chris Stainton (keyboards), Loren Gold (keyboards/backing vocals), Frank Simes (musical director, keyboards, backing vocals, percussion), and a 2-piece horn section.
2014–2016	23 November 2014 – 29 May 2016 (Worldwide)	69
The group undertook its "long goodbye" with its first ever appearance in the United Arab Emirates followed by a UK leg. 2015 saw dates in Europe and two long legs in North America. The personnel from the previous tour was retained, minus the horn section.
2016	11 June 2016 – 16 October 2016 (Europe, North America)	13
A continuity of the previous tour, consisting of concerts in Europe and North America. The tour was announced on 3 May 2016. The personnel from the previous tour was retained.
Tommy 2017	30 March 2017 – 12 April 2017 (United Kingdom)	7
A British Tommy (plus hits) 7-date concert tour.
2017	13 July 2017 – 1 October 2017 (North America, South America)	19
A 19-date North & South American concert tour.
2019–2021	7 May 2019 – 29 March 2021 (North America, United Kingdom)	56
A 56-show symphonic concert tour of North America and the U.K., partially supporting their album Who.
