= Moving On! Tour =

2019 concert tour by the Who

- Tour by The Who
- Location: United States; England
- Associated album: Who
- Start date: May 7, 2019
- End date: October 24, 2019
- Legs: 3
- No. of shows: 28 in North America; 1 in Europe; 29 in total

The Who concert chronology
- The Who Tour 2017 (2017); Moving On! Tour (2019); The Who Hits Back! Tour (2022–2023)

The Moving On! Tour was a symphonic concert tour by the English rock band the Who, partially in support of their album Who.

== Overview ==
The Moving On! Tour consisted of 29 performances in North America and the United Kingdom. The tour was announced on January 11, 2019, and included local symphonic orchestras accompanying the Who at each performance, with orchestral arrangements by David Campbell. Pete Townshend and Roger Daltrey are the only remaining members of the group, along with longtime touring members Simon Townshend and Zak Starkey, and an ensemble of others. The tour was cut short in March 2020 by the COVID-19 pandemic. Ten shows in Ireland and the United Kingdom were eventually rescheduled for March 2021, but those were canceled a month before the fact in February 2021 and the band has announced no further plans.

== Tour band ==
The Who

- Roger Daltrey – lead vocals, harmonica, acoustic guitar, rhythm guitar, tambourine
- Pete Townshend – lead and rhythm guitar, acoustic guitar, backing and lead vocals

Backing musicians

- Simon Townshend – rhythm guitar, acoustic guitar, backing vocals
- Loren Gold – piano, keyboards, jaw harp, backing vocals
- Jon Button – bass guitar, backing vocals
- Zak Starkey – drums, percussion
- Billy Nicholls – backing vocals, tambourine
- Katie Jacoby – violin
- Audrey Snyder – cello

== Typical set lists ==
(*) = without orchestra

=== Spring 2019 ===
A four-week tour in North America began on May 7 at Van Andel Arena in Grand Rapids, Michigan, and ended on May 30 at PPG Paints Arena in Pittsburgh. A track from the band's 1975 album The Who by Numbers, "Imagine a Man", made its live debut during this tour, and "Won't Get Fooled Again" was played in an acoustic version. A typical set list of this leg was as follows (all songs written by Pete Townshend):

1. "Overture"
2. "It's a Boy"
3. "1921"
4. "Amazing Journey"
5. "The Acid Queen" (dropped after May 7)
6. "Sparks"
7. "Pinball Wizard"
8. "We're Not Gonna Take It"
9. "Who Are You"
10. "Eminence Front"
11. "Imagine a Man"
12. "Join Together" or "You Better You Bet"*
13. "The Kids Are Alright"* or "Substitute"*
14. "I Can See for Miles"* or "The Seeker"*
15. "Won't Get Fooled Again"*
16. "Behind Blue Eyes"
17. "Tea & Theatre"*
18. "The Real Me"
19. "I'm One"
20. "The Punk and the Godfather"
21. "5:15"
22. "Drowned"
23. "The Rock"
24. "Love, Reign o'er Me"
25. "Baba O'Riley"

=== Autumn 2019 ===
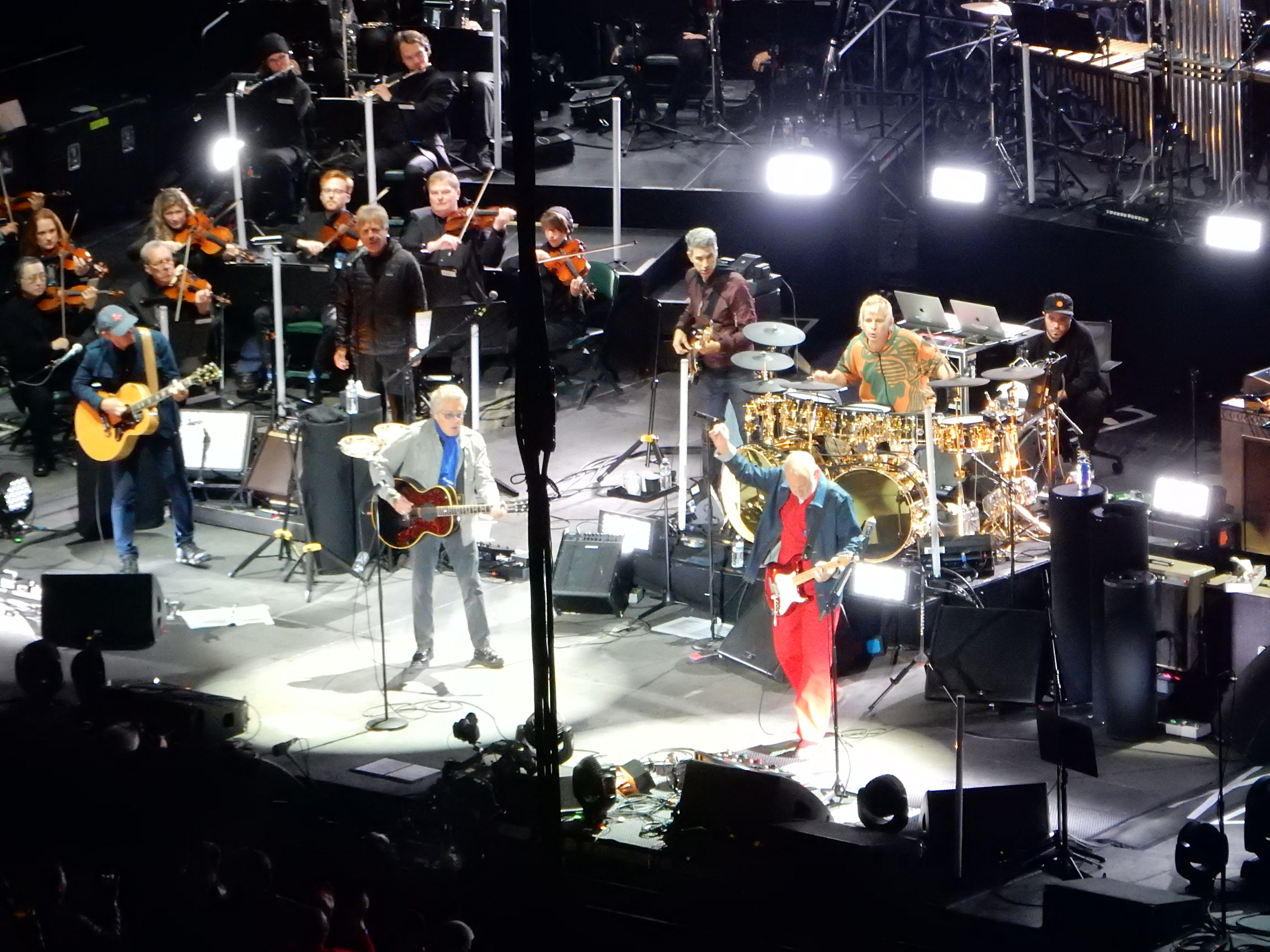
The band at T-Mobile Park in Seattle, October 19, 2019

After a show at Wembley Stadium in London, England on June 1, another North American tour started on September 1 at Madison Square Garden in New York City and stopped on October 24 at the Hollywood Bowl in Los Angeles. The setlist of the Autumn leg was not very different from the Spring leg, but two new songs from their upcoming album Who were debuted: "Hero Ground Zero" and "Ball and Chain", previously known as "Guantanamo". A typical setlist of this tour is as follows (all songs written by Pete Townshend):

1. "Overture"
2. "1921"
3. "Amazing Journey"
4. "Sparks"
5. "Pinball Wizard"
6. "We're Not Gonna Take It"
7. "Who Are You"
8. "Eminence Front"
9. "Imagine a Man"
10. "Join Together" or "You Better You Bet"
11. "Hero Ground Zero"
12. "I Can See for Miles"* or "The Seeker"*
13. "Won't Get Fooled Again"*
14. "Behind Blue Eyes"
15. "Ball and Chain"
16. "The Real Me"
17. "I'm One"
18. "The Punk and the Godfather"
19. "5:15"
20. "Drowned"
21. "The Rock"
22. "Love, Reign o'er Me"
23. "Baba O'Riley"

== Tour dates ==
Date	City	Country	Venue	Opening acts
North America – leg #1
May 7, 2019	Grand Rapids	United States	Van Andel Arena	Dirty Honey
May 9, 2019	Buffalo	United States	KeyBank Center	Arkells
May 11, 2019	Bristow	United States	Jiffy Lube Live	Peter Wolf
May 13, 2019	New York City	United States	Madison Square Garden	Leslie Mendelson
May 16, 2019	Nashville	United States	Bridgestone Arena	Lukas Nelson & Promise of the Real
May 18, 2019	Noblesville	United States	Ruoff Home Mortgage Music Center	Reignwolf
May 21, 2019	Tinley Park	United States	Hollywood Casino Amphitheatre	Reignwolf
May 23, 2019	Maryland Heights	United States	Hollywood Casino Amphitheatre	The HillBenders
May 25, 2019	Philadelphia	United States	Citizens Bank Park	Peter Wolf
May 28, 2019	Detroit	United States	Little Caesars Arena	Arkells
May 30, 2019	Pittsburgh	United States	PPG Paints Arena	Reignwolf
1 UK stand-alone show
July 6, 2019	London	England	Wembley Stadium	Kaiser Chiefs; Imelda May; Eddie Vedder
North America – leg #2
September 1, 2019	New York City	United States	Madison Square Garden	Leslie Mendelson
September 3, 2019 (Note: The concert of September 3, 2019, at Scotiabank Arena in Toronto was originally planned to take place on June 1, 2019, but was rescheduled to accommodate the Toronto Raptors advancing to the 2019 NBA Finals)	Toronto	Canada	Scotiabank Arena	Moon Vs Sun
September 6, 2019	Saint Paul	United States	Xcel Energy Center	Reignwolf
September 8, 2019	East Troy	United States	Alpine Valley Music Theatre	Dead Horses
September 10, 2019	Cuyahoga Falls	United States	Blossom Music Center	Peter Wolf
September 13, 2019	Boston	United States	Fenway Park	Peter Wolf
September 15, 2019	Wantagh	United States	Northwell Health at Jones Beach Theater	Reignwolf
September 18, 2019	Atlanta	United States	State Farm Arena	Reignwolf
September 20, 2019	Sunrise	United States	BB&T Center	Reignwolf
September 22, 2019	Tampa	United States	Amalie Arena	Reignwolf
October 9, 2019	San Francisco	United States	Chase Center	Liam Gallagher
October 11, 2019	Los Angeles	United States	Hollywood Bowl	Liam Gallagher
October 13, 2019	Los Angeles	United States	Hollywood Bowl	Liam Gallagher
October 16, 2019	San Diego	United States	Viejas Arena	Liam Gallagher
October 19, 2019	Seattle	United States	T-Mobile Park	Liam Gallagher
October 21, 2019	Vancouver	Canada	Rogers Arena	Liam Gallagher
October 24, 2019	Los Angeles	United States	Hollywood Bowl	Liam Gallagher
4 UK post-tour shows (celebrating the February 14, 1970 Leeds show)
February 12, 2020 (2 shows)	Kingston upon Thames	England	PRYZM	—
February 14, 2020 (2 shows)	Kingston upon Thames	England	PRYZM	—

== Cancelled shows ==
Date	City	Country	Venue	Reason
North America – leg #2 (2019)
September 25, 2019	Houston	United States	Toyota Center	Illness
September 27, 2019	Dallas	United States	American Airlines Center	Illness
September 29, 2019	Denver	United States	Pepsi Center	Illness
North America 2019
October 23, 2019	Edmonton	Canada	Rogers Place	Scheduling conflicts
UK & Ireland 2020
March 16, 2020	Manchester	England	Manchester Arena	The COVID-19 pandemic
March 18, 2020	Dublin	Ireland	3Arena	The COVID-19 pandemic
March 21, 2020	Newcastle upon Tyne	England	Utilita Arena Newcastle	The COVID-19 pandemic
March 23, 2020	Glasgow	Scotland	SSE Hydro	The COVID-19 pandemic
March 25, 2020	Leeds	England	First Direct Arena	The COVID-19 pandemic
March 28, 2020 (Note: As part of the annual Teenage Cancer Trust shows)	London	England	Royal Albert Hall	The COVID-19 pandemic
March 30, 2020	Cardiff	Wales	Motorpoint Arena Cardiff	The COVID-19 pandemic
April 1, 2020	Birmingham	England	Resorts World Arena	The COVID-19 pandemic
April 3, 2020	Nottingham	England	Motorpoint Arena	The COVID-19 pandemic
April 6, 2020	Liverpool	England	M&S Bank Arena	The COVID-19 pandemic
April 8, 2020	London	England	The SSE Arena, Wembley	The COVID-19 pandemic
North America 2020 – leg #3 – Cancelled tour
April 21, 2020	Hollywood	United States	Hard Rock Live	The COVID-19 pandemic
April 23, 2020	Highland Heights	United States	BB&T Arena	The COVID-19 pandemic
April 27, 2020 (Note: April 2020 Rescheduled show (from September 2019) – cancelled ever since)	Dallas	United States	American Airlines Center	The COVID-19 pandemic
April 30, 2020 (Note: April 2020 Rescheduled show (from September 2019) – cancelled ever since)	Houston	United States	Toyota Center	The COVID-19 pandemic
May 2, 2020 (Note: May 2020 Rescheduled show (from September 2019) – cancelled ever since)	Denver	United States	Pepsi Center	The COVID-19 pandemic
May 5, 2020	Las Vegas	United States	The Colosseum at Caesars Palace	The COVID-19 pandemic
May 7, 2020	Las Vegas	United States	The Colosseum at Caesars Palace	The COVID-19 pandemic
May 9, 2020	Las Vegas	United States	The Colosseum at Caesars Palace	The COVID-19 pandemic
May 12, 2020	Las Vegas	United States	The Colosseum at Caesars Palace	The COVID-19 pandemic
May 14, 2020	Las Vegas	United States	The Colosseum at Caesars Palace	The COVID-19 pandemic
May 16, 2020	Las Vegas	United States	The Colosseum at Caesars Palace	The COVID-19 pandemic
UK & Ireland 2021 – Rescheduled shows (from March–April 2020) cancelled once again
March 5, 2021	Dublin	Ireland	3Arena	The COVID-19 pandemic
March 8, 2021	Liverpool	England	M&S Bank Arena	The COVID-19 pandemic
March 10, 2021	Glasgow	Scotland	SSE Hydro	The COVID-19 pandemic
March 12, 2021	Newcastle	England	Utilita Arena Newcastle	The COVID-19 pandemic
March 15, 2021	Leeds	England	First Direct Arena	The COVID-19 pandemic
March 17, 2021	Birmingham	England	Resorts World Arena	The COVID-19 pandemic
March 22, 2021	London	England	Wembley Arena	The COVID-19 pandemic
March 24, 2021	Nottingham	England	Motorpoint Arena	The COVID-19 pandemic
March 27, 2021	Cardiff	England	Motorpoint Arena	The COVID-19 pandemic
March 29, 2021	Manchester	England	AO Arena	The COVID-19 pandemic

== See also ==
- List of The Who tours and performances
