= Quadrophenia (disambiguation) =

Quadrophenia may refer to:

- Quadrophenia, the album by the Who:
  - "Quadrophenia", the title track from the Quadrophenia album
  - Quadrophenia (film), the 1979 film based on the rock opera
    - Quadrophenia (soundtrack), the soundtrack from the 1979 film
  - Tommy and Quadrophenia Live, a DVD from The Who's 1989 and 1996-97 tours released in 2005
  - Quadrophenia (musical), a stage musical based on the rock opera
- "Quadrophenia" (North Square), a 2000 television episode

== See also ==
- Quadrophonia, a Dutch/Belgian musical group
- Quadraphonic sound
