= The Who Tour 2000 =

2000 concert tour by the Who

- Tour by The Who
- Location: United States; Canada; United Kingdom
- Start date: 6 June 2000
- End date: 27 November 2000
- Legs: 4
- No. of shows: 38

The Who concert chronology
- The Who 1999 performances (1999); The Who Tour 2000 (2000); The Who Tour 2002 (2002)

The Who Tour 2000 was partially in support of the Who's live album The Blues to the Bush and their first full-fledged tour as a five-piece band since The Who Tour 1982.

== History ==
The group's successful series of shows in late 1999 led them to carry out a much longer series of dates, with three two-week legs in the United States and another 11 shows in the United Kingdom. Both the first and last shows of the year were charity performances, the latter at London's Royal Albert Hall and including special guests. The Royal Albert Hall show was also released on CD and DVD (see "Live Releases" below).

The group began by playing a charity show at the Jacob K. Javits Convention Center in New York City on 6 June, although this was not technically part of the tour. Drummer Zak Starkey was not available for this performance, so Simon Phillips, who had been the drummer on the 1989 tour, sat in. The United States leg officially began on 25 June at the New World Music Theatre in the Chicago suburb of Tinley Park, Illinois and comprised three two-week legs, concluding with the last of four shows at New York City's Madison Square Garden 7 October. The United Kingdom leg began at the National Exhibition Centre in Birmingham on 30 October and ended with a charity performance at the Royal Albert Hall (benefiting the Teenage Cancer Trust) on 27 November.

Although original bassist John Entwistle would play with the band at The Concert for New York City in October 2001 and at a series of dates in England in early the Who Tour 2002, this was his last full-completed tour with the band before his death.

The shows in general were greeted with accolades from both fans and press. Entwistle sang very little vocals compared to before, and apart from lead on My Wife, only sang backing vocals on I Can't Explain and Substitute. Bargain was played in the lower key of A Major rather than the original key of Bb, to suit Daltrey's vocals. Starkey's drumming was now perfectly suited to the band, allowing more loose jamming during songs for the first time since the late 1970s, and Townshend smashed his guitar at the end of the Jones Beach show on 9 July, the only occasion this happened on the whole tour.

== Live releases ==
Live material from 2000 has appeared on the following releases:

- The show of 27 November was released on CD as Live at the Royal Albert Hall. The set also includes bonus material from John Entwistle's last show with the band on 8 February 2002, also at the Royal Albert Hall.
- The 27 November show was also released on DVD as The Who & Special Guests: Live at the Royal Albert Hall, although this release omitted "Getting In Tune" and "Mary Anne with the Shaky Hand".

== Tour band ==
- Roger Daltrey – lead vocals, harmonica, occasional acoustic guitar
- Pete Townshend – lead guitar, vocals
- John Entwistle – bass guitar, vocals

Additional Members

- Zak Starkey – drums (except on 6 June)
- John Bundrick – piano, keyboards, backing vocals
- Simon Phillips – drums (6 June only)

== Set list ==
Set lists were similar to what the group played in 1999, but the band added the Lifehouse songs "Relay" (last played in 1980) and "I Don't Even Know Myself" (last played in The Who Tour 1971) for these shows. Also played at the beginning of the tour was "The Seeker", which group hadn't done since The Who Tour 1970, but it was dropped after only four performances. Beginning on 9 July, Townshend began performing a solo acoustic spot, either with "Drowned" or "I'm One"; in Cleveland, he opted to play "Sheraton Gibson" (from his 1972 solo album Who Came First), explaining that the song was about the city of Cleveland. Townshend added a coda to "My Generation" during the UK tour which would eventually become the faster section of the John Entwistle tribute "Old Red Wine". The charity show in New York on 6 June had a slightly shorter set list than what was played on the tour itself.

Below is a typical set list for the tour (all songs written by Pete Townshend unless otherwise specified):

1. "I Can't Explain"
2. "Substitute"
3. "Anyway, Anyhow, Anywhere" (Roger Daltrey, Pete Townshend)
4. "I Don't Even Know Myself" (Not played on 14, 27, and 29 August, 24 September, and 3, 5, and 30 October)
5. "My Wife" (John Entwistle)
6. "Baba O'Riley"
7. "The Seeker" (Dropped after 1 July)
8. "Drowned" (Added on 9 July)
9. "Bargain"
10. "Getting In Tune" (Dropped from 1 July to 22 August)
11. "The Relay" (Sometimes appeared as the fourth song in the set)
12. "Pinball Wizard"
13. "The Real Me"
14. "Who Are You"
15. "Magic Bus"
16. "Behind Blue Eyes"
17. "You Better You Bet"
18. "5.15"
19. "Won't Get Fooled Again"

Encores:

1. "The Kids Are Alright" (occasionally played in the middle of the set)
2. "Let's See Action"
3. "Mary Anne with the Shaky Hand" (UK leg only)
4. "My Generation"

There were some set list substitutions, variations, and order switches during the tour. Some other songs were played which are not in the above lists:

- "I'm One" (performed either with the whole band or as a Townshend solo acoustic performance)
  - Performed on 29 June; 1, 3, 5 and 7 July; 19, 22 and 24 August; 6 October and 8 November.
- "Naked Eye" (occasionally played as an encore)
  - Performed on 3 July; 21, 22, 24, 25 and 27 August; 24 September and 4 October.
- "See Me, Feel Me"
  - Performed on 3 July.
- Medley: "I Walk the Line" (Johnny Cash)/"Ring of Fire" (June Carter, Merle Kilgore)
  - Performed on 24 August.
- "Sheraton Gibson"
  - Performed on 30 September.
- "Dance It Away"
  - Performed (loosely) on 1 July and 30 September.
- "Old Red Wine" (ending riff only)
  - Performed at the end of "My Generation" during the UK tour.
- "A Quick One, While He's Away"
  - Performed (only the "You Are Forgiven" section) on 16 November.

In light of the special guests, the set list at 27 November charity show at the Royal Albert Hall differed somewhat from the rest of the tour. Townshend chose to play a solo acoustic version of "Heart to Hang Onto" (from his 1977 album with Ronnie Lane, Rough Mix) and followed with the first performance of "So Sad About Us" since 1967, playing with guest Paul Weller. Set list:

1. "I Can't Explain"
2. "Anyway, Anyhow, Anywhere"
3. "Pinball Wizard"
4. "The Relay"
5. "My Wife" (John Entwistle)
6. "The Kids Are Alright"
7. "Mary Anne with the Shaky Hand"
8. "Bargain"
9. "Magic Bus"
10. "Who Are You"
11. "Baba O'Riley" (featuring violinist Nigel Kennedy in place of Roger Daltrey's usual harmonica solo)
12. "Drowned" (Townshend solo acoustic)
13. "Heart to Hang Onto" (Townshend solo acoustic)
14. "So Sad About Us" (featuring only Townshend and Paul Weller on both acoustic guitars and vocals)
15. "I'm One" (featuring Eddie Vedder on vocals)
16. "Getting In Tune" (featuring Eddie Vedder on vocals)
17. "Behind Blue Eyes" (featuring Bryan Adams on vocals)
18. "You Better You Bet"
19. "The Real Me"
20. "5.15"
21. "Won't Get Fooled Again" (featuring Noel Gallagher on lead guitar)

Encores:

1. "Substitute" (featuring Kelly Jones on electric guitar and vocals)
2. "Let's See Action" (featuring Eddie Vedder on vocals)
3. "My Generation"
4. "See Me, Feel Me"

== Tour dates ==
Date	City	Country	Venue	Tickets sold / available	Revenue
New York City Charity Performance
6 June 2000	New York City	United States	Jacob K. Javits Convention Center		
North America First Leg
25 June 2000	Tinley Park	United States	New World Music Theatre		
27 June 2000	Auburn Hills	United States	The Palace of Auburn Hills	13,799 / 15,040	$1,047,520
29 June 2000	Burgettstown	United States	Star Lake Amphitheater		
1 July 2000	Holmdel Township	United States	PNC Bank Arts Center		
3 July 2000	Mansfield	United States	Tweeter Center		
5 July 2000	Bristow	United States	Nissan Pavilion		
7 July 2000	Camden	United States	E-Centre		
9 July 2000	Wantagh	United States	Jones Beach Theater	14,199 / 14,499	$1,194,860
North America Second Leg
14 August 2000	Los Angeles	United States	Hollywood Bowl		
16 August 2000	Irvine	United States	Verizon Wireless Amphitheatre		
17 August 2000	San Diego	United States	San Diego Sports Arena		
19 August 2000	George	United States	The Gorge Amphitheatre		
21 August 2000	Mountain View	United States	Shoreline Amphitheatre		
22 August 2000	Marysville	United States	Sacramento Valley Amphitheater		
24 August 2000	Denver	United States	Pepsi Center	10,451 / 11,153	$766,179
25 August 2000	Albuquerque	United States	Mesa del Sol Amphitheater		
27 August 2000	Dallas	United States	Reunion Arena		
29 August 2000	The Woodlands	United States	Cynthia Woods Mitchell Pavilion		
North America Third Leg
24 September 2000	West Palm Beach	United States	Mars Music Amphitheater		
26 September 2000	Tampa	United States	Ice Palace	11,038 / 13,674	$602,867
28 September 2000	Atlanta	United States	Philips Arena		
30 September 2000	Cleveland	United States	Gund Arena		
3 October 2000	New York City	United States	Madison Square Garden		
4 October 2000	New York City	United States	Madison Square Garden		
6 October 2000	New York City	United States	Madison Square Garden		
7 October 2000	New York City	United States	Madison Square Garden		
Europe
30 October 2000	Birmingham	England	National Exhibition Centre		
2 November 2000	Manchester	England	Manchester Arena		
3 November 2000	Glasgow	Scotland	Scottish Exhibition and Conference Centre		
5 November 2000	Glasgow	Scotland	Scottish Exhibition and Conference Centre		
6 November 2000	Newcastle	England	Newcastle Arena		
8 November 2000	Birmingham	England	National Exhibition Centre		
10 November 2000	Sheffield	England	Sheffield Arena		
13 November 2000	London	England	London Arena		
15 November 2000	London	England	Wembley Arena		
16 November 2000	London	England	Wembley Arena		
27 November 2000	London	England	Royal Albert Hall		

== See also ==
- The Who tours and performances
