= I'm One =

Song by The Who

Song by the Who

from the album Quadrophenia
- Released: 1973
- Genre: Folk; rock
- Length: 2:37
- Label: MCA
- Songwriter: Pete Townshend

"I'm One" is a song by the English rock band the Who. It was released on the group's 1973 rock opera album Quadrophenia. Written and sung by Pete Townshend, the song has since become a fan favorite.

== Background ==
"I'm One" is one of the main moments of introspection spread throughout the narrative and also an indication that Jimmy, the main character of the album's story, may not be as Mod as he would wish to appear, given the way he asks a fellow Mod where he got his clothes (Mods would lose face asking another Mod where he obtained his clothes from). Pete Townshend said of the song's lyrical inspiration:

When I was a nipper I felt that the guitar was all I had. I wasn't tough enough to be in a gang, I wasn't good-looking enough to be in with the birds, not clever enough to make it at school, not good enough on my feet to be good football player. I was a fucking loser. I think everyone feels that way at some point. And somehow being a Mod - even though I was too old to be a Mod really - I wrote this song with that in mind. Jimmy, the hero of the story, is thinking he hasn't got much going for him but at least he's one.

The song features an acoustic opening followed by the rest of the band (excluding singer Roger Daltrey) joining in.

"I'm One" was one of the ten original Quadrophenia tracks to appear in remixed form on the soundtrack to the Who's 1979 film Quadrophenia, which was based on the original rock opera. This version of the song also saw single release as the B-side to the 1979 remixed single release of "5.15".

The song is featured on the soundtrack for Freaks and Geeks in the episode "Dead Dogs and Gym Teachers", which featured many of the Who's songs.

== Live performances ==
This song was performed first on the band's original 1973–1974 Quadrophenia Tour, but it was never performed with Moon again afterwards. It made sporadic appearances in the 1981 (only once), 1982 (only the first verse; as an intro to "The Punk and the Godfather") and 1989 tours as well. It was then brought back for every concert on the 1996–1997 Quadrophenia Tour. Performances after that, from 2000 onward, were often performed by Pete Townshend alone on stage (although some feature the full band).

== Appearances ==
The following Who albums and DVDs feature "I'm One":

- Quadrophenia
- Quadrophenia (soundtrack)
- Live at the Royal Albert Hall (with Eddie Vedder)
- The Who & Special Guests: Live at the Royal Albert Hall (with Eddie Vedder)
- Tommy and Quadrophenia Live
- Encore Series 2002 (certain concerts)
- Encore Series 2004 (one concert)
- Encore Series 2006 and 2007 (certain concerts)
- Quadrophenia Live in London

== Personnel ==
- Pete Townshend – lead vocals, guitar, keyboards
- John Entwistle – bass
- Keith Moon – drums

== In popular culture ==
The song is featured in the Freaks and Geeks episode "Dead Dogs and Gym Teachers", in a montage where Bill Haverchuck eats and watches TV after school.
