= Live in Boston (film) =

- Directed by: Jonathan Beswick
- Starring: The Who; Roger Daltrey; Pete Townshend; John Bundrick; Pino Palladino; Zak Starkey; Simon Townshend
- Music by: The Who
- Production companies: Rhino (U.S.); Warner Music Vision (UK)
- Distributed by: Rhino (U.S.); Warner Music Vision (UK)
- Release dates: 13 September 2003 (UK); 14 September 2003 (U.S.)
- Running time: 141 min.
- Language: English

Live in Boston is a concert film of a concert performed by the Who on September 27, 2002 (mistakenly credited as September 24, 2002). It was recorded at the Xfinity Center in Mansfield, Massachusetts, despite the title suggesting it was filmed in Boston. This concert was the penultimate show of the Who's first tour without bass player John Entwistle, who died just prior to the beginning of the tour, being replaced by Pino Palladino, who made his debut with the Who on this tour, remaining until 2017. Simon Townshend (Pete's brother, who had also appeared on the Quadrophenia Tour of 1996-1997) also became a regular member of the Who's touring band on this tour. An audio only CD release of this concert was also released as a part of Encore Series 2002. Bonus features on the DVD include interviews with Roger Daltrey and Pete Townshend, along with a gallery including artwork by John Entwistle.

== Songs performed ==
1. "I Can't Explain"
2. "Substitute"
3. "Anyway, Anyhow, Anywhere"
4. "Who Are You"
5. "Another Tricky Day"
6. "The Relay"
7. "Bargain"
8. "Baba O'Riley"
9. "Sea and Sand"
10. "5:15"
11. "Love, Reign O'er Me"
12. "Eminence Front"
13. "Behind Blue Eyes"
14. "You Better You Bet"
15. "The Kids Are Alright"
16. "My Generation"
17. "Won't Get Fooled Again"
18. "Pinball Wizard"
19. "Amazing Journey" / "Sparks"
20. "See Me, Feel Me / Listening to You"
