= Live in Boston =

Live in Boston is the name of at least three albums.

- Live in Boston (Fleetwood Mac album) : Live recordings from the Peter Green era, released many times in different formats, with a definitive 3-CD set finally being issued in 1998.
- Fleetwood Mac: Live in Boston : A DVD / CD set of a concert recorded in 2003, by the Stevie Nicks / Lindsey Buckingham line-up of the group.
- Live in Boston (The Doors album) : 3CD live album by the Doors, released in 2007.
- Live in Boston (film) : a concert film of a concert performed by The Who on September 24, 2002, in Boston, Massachusetts
