= The Who 1962–63 performances =

Performances by the Who from 1962 to 1963

The Who 1962–1963 performances
- Tour by The Who
- Poster to the concerts in Ealing
- Location: United Kingdom; France; Scandinavia; Germany; Netherlands
- Start date: July 1962
- End date: 29 December 1963
- Legs: 2
- No. of shows: 166 (approximately)

The Who concert chronology
- The Who 1962–1963 performances (1962–63); The Who 1964 performances (1964)

The Who, then known as The Detours, began performing in mid-1962 in a variety of line-ups before the band members became more settled, along with their roles within the group.

== History ==
In the group's earliest days, singer Colin Dawson handled lead vocals while Roger Daltrey played lead guitar and Pete Townshend played rhythm guitar. With Dawson leaving the group in early 1963, Daltrey and singer/bassist Gabby Connolly took over lead vocals, although Connolly would only remain with the group until May of that year; both Daltrey and John Entwistle would also play brass instruments (specifically Daltrey on trombone and Entwistle on trumpet) during certain trad or Dixieland jazz numbers that were part of the group's repertoire before they moved to predominantly R&B material. By mid-1963, Daltrey would become the full-time lead vocalist, with Townshend handling all guitar duties. Drummer Doug Sandom rounded out the group, who performed in and around London at this time.

As no recordings exist from this period, little is known about the band's set lists. However, the band did reportedly perform several Beatles covers, including "I Saw Her Standing There", as well as numbers like Chuck Berry's "Come On". Townshend's first songwriting effort "It Was You" was also part of the group's act early on.

The group would be known as the Who starting in 1964, the same year Keith Moon would join the band, replacing Doug Sandom on drums.

== Tour band ==
- Roger Daltrey – lead vocals, lead guitar, harmonica, trombone
- Pete Townshend – rhythm guitar, lead guitar
- John Entwistle – trumpet, bass guitar, occasional lead vocals
- Doug Sandom – drums
- Colin Dawson – lead vocals (1962)
- Gabby Connolly – lead vocals, bass guitar (early-mid-1963)

== Performance dates ==
Date	City	Country	Venue
1 July 1962	Peckham	England	Paradise Club
?? July 1962	Peckham	England	Paradise Club
?? July 1962	Peckham	England	Paradise Club
?? August 1962	Peckham	England	Paradise Club
?? August 1962	Peckham	England	Paradise Club
1 September 1962	Acton	England	Acton Town Hall
23 November 1962	Kent	England	Grand Ballroom
30 November 1962	Kent	England	Grand Ballroom
4 January 1963	Kent	England	Grand Ballroom
11 January 1963	Ealing	England	Fox and Goose Hotel
18 January 1963	Kent	England	Grand Ballroom
19 January 1963	Northolt	England	CAV Sports Ground
17 February 1963	London	England	Douglas House
18 February 1963	Acton	England	White Hart Hotel
21 February 1963	Greenford	England	Oldfield Hotel
22 February 1963	Kent	England	Grand Ballroom
23 February 1963	Greenford	England	Oldfield Hotel
24 February 1963	London	England	Douglas House
24 February 1963	Acton	England	White Hart Hotel
25 February 1963	Acton	England	White Hart Hotel
28 February 1963	Greenford	England	Oldfield Hotel
3 March 1963	London	England	Douglas House
3 March 1963	Acton	England	White Hart Hotel
4 March 1963	Acton	England	White Hart Hotel
7 March 1963	Greenford	England	Oldfield Hotel
9 March 1963	Isleworth	England	Osterley Hotel
10 March 1963	London	England	Douglas House
11 March 1963	Acton	England	White Hart Hotel
13 March 1963	Kilburn	England	Mazenod Church Hall
14 March 1963	Greenford	England	Oldfield Hotel
17 March 1963	London	England	Douglas House
18 March 1963	Acton	England	White Hart Hotel
21 March 1963	Greenford	England	Oldfield Hotel
22 March 1963	Kent	England	Grand Ballroom
24 March 1963	London	England	Douglas House
25 March 1963	Acton	England	White Hart Hotel
28 March 1963	Greenford	England	Oldfield Hotel
29 March 1963	London	England	College of Distributive Trade (2 shows)
31 March 1963	London	England	Douglas House
1 April 1963	Acton	England	White Hart Hotel
4 April 1963	Greenford	England	Oldfield Hotel
6 April 1963	Northolt	England	CAV Sports Ground
7 April 1963	London	England	Douglas House
8 April 1963	Acton	England	White Hart Hotel
10 April 1963	Greenford	England	Oldfield Hotel
11 April 1963	Acton	England	White Hart Hotel
13 April 1963	Greenford	England	Oldfield Hotel
14 April 1963	London	England	Douglas House
15 April 1963	Acton	England	White Hart Hotel
18 April 1963	Greenford	England	Oldfield Hotel
19 April 1963	Kent	England	Grand Ballroom
21 April 1963	London	England	Douglas House
22 April 1963	Acton	England	White Hart Hotel
25 April 1963	Greenford	England	Oldfield Hotel
27 April 1963	Greenford	England	Oldfield Hotel
28 April 1963	London	England	Douglas House
29 April 1963	Acton	England	White Hart Hotel
30 April 1963	Greenford	England	Oldfield Hotel
5 May 1963	London	England	Douglas House
5 May 1963	Acton	England	White Hart Hotel
9 May 1963	Acton	England	White Hart Hotel
11 May 1963	Greenford	England	Oldfield Hotel
12 May 1963	London	England	Douglas House
17 May 1963	Hanwell	England	Carnival Ballroom, Park Hotel
18 May 1963	Greenford	England	Oldfield Hotel
19 May 1963	London	England	Douglas House
23 May 1963	Greenford	England	Oldfield Hotel
24 May 1963	Kent	England	Grand Ballroom
26 May 1963	London	England	Douglas House
26 May 1963	Acton	England	White Hart Hotel
28 May 1963	Greenford	England	Oldfield Hotel
31 May 1963	Kent	England	Grand Ballroom
1 June 1963	Greenford	England	Oldfield Hotel
6 June 1963	Acton	England	White Hart Hotel
7 June 1963	London	England	Goldhawk Social Club
8 June 1963	Greenford	England	Oldfield Hotel
9 June 1963	Acton	England	White Hart Hotel
13 June 1963	Acton	England	White Hart Hotel
14 June 1963	Wembley	England	GEC Pavilion
15 June 1963	Greenford	England	Oldfield Hotel
20 June 1963	Greenford	England	Oldfield Hotel
22 June 1963	Perivale	England	Millet Arms (wedding reception)
23 June 1963	Acton	England	White Hart Hotel
26 June 1963	Leicester Place	England	Club Druane, Notre Dame Church Hall
27 June 1963	Greenford	England	Oldfield Hotel
29 June 1963	Greenford	England	Oldfield Hotel
30 June 1963	Acton	England	White Hart Hotel
4 July 1963	Greenford	England	Oldfield Hotel
5 July 1963	London	England	Goldhawk Social Club
6 July 1963	Greenford	England	Oldfield Hotel
7 July 1963	Acton	England	White Hart Hotel
11 July 1963	Greenford	England	Oldfield Hotel
12 July 1963	London	England	Goldhawk Social Club
14 July 1963	Acton	England	White Hart Hotel
18 July 1963	Greenford	England	Oldfield Hotel
20 July 1963	Greenford	England	Oldfield Hotel
21 July 1963	Acton	England	White Hart Hotel
23 July 1963	Greenford	England	Oldfield Hotel
25 July 1963	Greenford	England	Oldfield Hotel
26 July 1963	Leicester Place	England	Club Druane, Dotre Dame Church Hall
10 August 1963	Greenford	England	Oldfield Hotel
11 August 1963	Acton	England	White Hart Hotel
15 August 1963	Acton	England	White Hart Hotel
16 August 1963	London	England	Goldhawk Social Club
17 August 1963	Greenford	England	Oldfield Hotel
18 August 1963	Acton	England	White Hart Hotel
20 August 1963	Greenford	England	Oldfield Hotel
22 August 1963	Greenford	England	Oldfield Hotel
25 August 1963	Acton	England	White Hart Hotel
27 August 1963	Greenford	England	Oldfield Hotel
29 August 1963	Greenford	England	Oldfield Hotel
30 August 1963	Leicester Place	England	Club Druane, Dotre Dame Church Hall
1 September 1963	Acton	England	White Hart Hotel
5 September 1963	Greenford	England	Oldfield Hotel
6 September 1963	London	England	Goldhawk Social Club
7 September 1963	Greenford	England	Oldfield Hotel
8 September 1963	Acton	England	White Hart Hotel
13 September 1963	Forest Hill	England	Glenlyn Ballroom
15 September 1963	Acton	England	White Hart Hotel
19 September 1963	Greenford	England	Oldfield Hotel
20 September 1963	Leicester Place	England	Club Druane, Dotre Dame Church Hall (unconfirmed)
22 September 1963	Acton	England	White Hart Hotel
26 September 1963	Greenford	England	Oldfield Hotel
27 September 1963	Leicester Place	England	Club Druane, Dotre Dame Church Hall (unconfirmed)
28 September 1963	Greenford	England	Oldfield Hotel
29 September 1963	Acton	England	White Hart Hotel
3 October 1963	Greenford	England	Oldfield Hotel
4 October 1963	Forest Hill	England	Glenlyn Ballroom
6 October 1963	Putney	England	St. Mary's Hall
10 October 1963	Greenford	England	Oldfield Hotel
11 October 1963	Forest Hill	England	Glenlyn Ballroom
12 October 1963	Greenford	England	Oldfield Hotel
17 October 1963	Greenford	England	Oldfield Hotel
24 October 1963	Greenford	England	Oldfield Hotel
25 October 1963	London	England	Goldhawk Social Club
26 October 1963	Greenford	England	Oldfield Hotel
27 October 1963	Putney	England	St. Mary's Hall
31 October 1963	Greenford	England	Oldfield Hotel
1 November 1963	Forest Hill	England	Glenlyn Ballroom
7 November 1963	Greenford	England	Oldfield Hotel
8 November 1963	London	England	Goldhawk Social Club
9 November 1963	Greenford	England	Oldfield Hotel
14 November 1963	Greenford	England	Oldfield Hotel
15 November 1963	Ealing	England	Feathers Hotel
17 November 1963	Putney	England	St. Mary's Hall
21 November 1963	Greenford	England	Oldfield Hotel
22 November 1963	London	England	Goldhawk Social Club
24 November 1963	Acton	England	White Hart Hotel
26 November 1963	Acton	England	Town Hall
28 November 1963	Greenford	England	Oldfield Hotel
29 November 1963	London	England	Goldhawk Social Club
30 November 1963	Wealdstone	England	Railway Hotel
1 December 1963	Putney	England	St. Mary's Hall
5 December 1963	Greenford	England	Oldfield Hotel
6 December 1963	Forest Hill	England	Glenlyn Ballroom
7 December 1963	Dunstable	England	California Ballroom
8 December 1963	Putney	England	St. Mary's Hall
12 December 1963	Greenford	England	Oldfield Hotel
13 December 1963	London	England	Evershed and Bignoles Apprentice Association Social Club Dance, Feathers Hotel
14 December 1963	Greenford	England	Oldfield Hotel
15 December 1963	Putney	England	St. Mary's Hall
19 December 1963	Greenford	England	Oldfield Hotel
20 December 1963	Forest Hill	England	Glenlyn Ballroom
22 December 1963	Putney	England	St. Mary's Hall
29 December 1963	Acton	England	White Hart Hotel

== See also ==
- List of The Who tours and performances
