= Tommy and Quadrophenia Live =

Video by the Who
- Released: (United States) 8 November 2005 (United Kingdom) 7 November 2005
- Studio: (United States) Rhino (United Kingdom) Warner Music Vision
- Length: 417 min.
- Language: English
- Label: (United States) Rhino (United Kingdom) Warner Music Vision
- Director: Roger Daltrey and Aubrey Powell

Tommy and Quadrophenia Live is a 3-disc DVD box set that includes performances by the Who from their 1989 (the Tommy portion) and 1996–1997 tours (the Quadrophenia portion). Whilst the Tommy part of the set had been already released on VHS, material from the Quadrophenia Tour had not been commercially available previously.

Both sets present a heavily augmented backing band supporting Roger Daltrey (vocals), Pete Townshend (guitar, piano and vocals) and John Entwistle (bass guitars and vocals). In 1989 the band featured Steve 'Boltz' Bolton on guitar, John Bundrick on piano and keyboards, Simon Phillips on drums, Jody Linscott on percussion, and Chyna, Billy Nicholls and Cleveland Watkiss on backing vocals, along with the Kick Horns brass ensemble. The 1996–97 band swapped Zak Starkey for Phillips on drums and Pete's brother Simon Townshend for Steve Bolton on guitar. For both tours Townshend heavily relied on acoustic guitars for the main part of the show, only trading it in for his electric guitars on some of the older numbers.

== Track listing ==
=== Disc 1 – Tommy ===
Live at the Universal Amphitheatre, Los Angeles in 1989 with special guests Phil Collins, Billy Idol, Elton John, Patti LaBelle and Steve Winwood.

1. "Overture"
2. "It's A Boy"
3. " 1921"
4. "Amazing Journey"
5. "Sparks"
6. "Eyesight to the Blind" (with Steve Winwood)
7. "Christmas"
8. "Cousin Kevin" (with Billy Idol)
9. "The Acid Queen" (with Patti LaBelle)
10. "Pinball Wizard" (with Elton John)
11. "Do You Think It's Alright?"
12. "Fiddle About" (with Phil Collins)
13. "There's A Doctor"
14. "Go to the Mirror!"
15. "Smash The Mirror"
16. "Tommy, Can You Hear Me?"
17. "I'm Free"
18. "Extra Extra / Miracle Cure"
19. "Sally Simpson"
20. "Sensation"
21. "Tommy's Holiday Camp" (with Phil Collins)
22. "We're Not Gonna Take It"

=== Disc 2 – Quadrophenia ===
A 90-minute show filmed in Dayton, Ohio, on the Who's 1996 United States tour with special guest Billy Idol and film sequences performed by Alex Langdon. Footage of Gary Glitter from the Dayton show was replaced for this DVD with PJ Proby performing the same material from the following year's tour.

1. "I Am the Sea"
2. "The Real Me"
3. "Quadrophenia"
4. "Cut My Hair"
5. "The Punk And The Godfather" (with PJ Proby)
6. "I'm One"
7. "The Dirty Jobs" (with Simon Townshend on co-lead vocals)
8. "Helpless Dancer"
9. "Is It In My Head?"
10. "I've Had Enough" (with Billy Idol and PJ Proby)
11. "5:15"
12. "Sea and Sand" (with Billy Idol)
13. "Drowned"
14. "Bell Boy" (with Billy Idol)
15. "Doctor Jimmy"
16. "The Rock"
17. "Love Reign O'er Me"

=== Disc 3 – Live Hits ===
Encore of disc one

Universal Amphitheatre, Los Angeles, 1989

1. "Substitute"
2. "I Can See For Miles"
3. "Baba O'Riley"
4. "Face the Face"
5. "Love Reign O'er Me"
6. "Boris the Spider"
7. "Dig"
8. "Join Together"
9. "Rough Boys"
10. "You Better You Bet"
11. "Behind Blue Eyes"
12. "Won't Get Fooled Again"
13. "Who Are You"

Encore of disc two

Dayton, OH, 1996 and West Palm Beach, FL, 1997

14. "Won't Get Fooled Again"
15. "Substitute"
16. "I Can't Explain"
17. "The Kids Are Alright"
18. "Behind Blue Eyes"
19. "Who Are You"

Giants Stadium, New Jersey, 1989

20. "The Acid Queen"
21. "Pinball Wizard"
22. "A Little Is Enough"

=== Bonus features ===
- Both the Tommy and Quadrophenia performances have visual commentaries that can be triggered from the DVD menu or in feature by pressing enter. These commentaries superimpose 2005 interviews of Townshend and Daltrey over the concert footage.
- The Tommy disc also features a photo gallery of stills from the 1989 tour.
- The Quadrophenia disc also includes a featurette, "The Quadrophenia Story".
- The Live Hits disc also includes an interview featurette, "Billy Idol: From Cousin Kevin to the Ace Face."

== Certifications ==
Region	Certification	Certified units/sales
Australia (ARIA)	Gold	7,500^{^}
^{^} Shipments figures based on certification alone.
