= Who (album) =

2019 studio album by The Who

Studio album by the Who
- Released: 6 December 2019
- Recorded: 3 February – August 2019
- Studios: British Grove and Metropolis Studios, London, England
- Genre: Rock
- Length: 45:45 57:01 (w. 3 bonus original tracks) 61:34 (w. 4 bonus original tracks)
- Labels: Polydor; Interscope
- Producers: Pete Townshend and Dave Sardy, with (for Roger Daltrey's vocals only) Bob Pridden and Dave Eringa

The Who chronology
Live at the Fillmore East 1968 (2018)	Who (2019)	Essential The Who (2020)

Singles from Who
- 1. "Ball and Chain" Released: 13 September 2019; 2. "All This Music Must Fade" Released: 3 October 2019; 3. "I Don't Wanna Get Wise" Released: 22 November 2019; 4. "Beads on One String (remix)" Released: 6 October 2020

Who is the twelfth studio album by the English rock band the Who. It was released on 6 December 2019. The band's first new studio album in thirteen years, and the second overall comprising the duo of vocalist Roger Daltrey and instrumentalist Pete Townshend, it comprises ballads, rock music, electronic experimentation and "classic Who-ish" songs, according to Townshend.

Promoted by three singles, including the lead single "Ball and Chain", Who was a commercial success, reaching number three on the UK Albums Chart and number two on the American Billboard 200. The album was also positively received by music critics. The Who supported the album with their Moving On! Tour.

== Recording and release ==
In January 2019, The Who confirmed that they were working on their first album of new material in 13 years (since their 2006 studio album Endless Wire), which would contain "dark ballads, heavy rock stuff, experimental electronica, sampled stuff and Who-ish tunes that began with a guitar that goes yanga-dang", as Townshend stated.

"Ball and Chain", released as the first single on 13 September 2019, is a re-recording of a Pete Townshend solo song called "Guantanamo", which was released on his 2015 compilation Truancy: The Very Best of Pete Townshend. A second song, "All This Music Must Fade" was released as a single on 3 October 2019 and a third, "I Don't Wanna Get Wise" received a release on Spotify and iTunes in November 2019.

The album was supported by their Moving On! Tour. "Got Nothing to Prove", one of the deluxe edition bonus tracks, was initially recorded as a demo in 1966, but was ultimately discarded by their manager and producer Kit Lambert due to lack of emotional resonance in the lyrics. "Sand", another early demo from 1966, is included on the Japan edition of the album as a bonus track. "Got Nothing to Prove" was later offered to Jimmy James and the Vagabonds, (who supported the Who at their Marquee Club performances in 1965) who also declined it.

The album debuted at number two on the US Billboard 200 album chart for the week ending 21 December 2019.

On 30 October 2020, the Who released a new deluxe edition of Who featuring an updated version of "Beads on One String" newly remixed by Pete Townshend plus a bonus CD of live acoustic tracks from their only two live shows of 2020. The extra songs on the deluxe version of Who were recorded in Kingston-on-Thames on Valentines Day 2020, exactly 50 years to the day since the band's show at Leeds University that resulted in the live album Live at Leeds.

== Composition ==
Conceptually, the album tackles the struggles of being an elderly rock musician, as The Guardian writer, Alexis Petridis noted. "Townshend seems more troubled than ever," Petridis stated, and this feeling overlaps into songs such as "I Don't Wanna Get Wise", which according to Petridis, "views a rock career as one of inevitable decline." Musically, the album sounds like a "traditional" Who record. Senior Rolling Stone writer, Kory Grow, called WHO, "classic rock comfort food" and commented on its nostalgic feel: "Townshend and Daltrey...can still summon their inner Who-ness in their mid 70s." Likewise, Ultimate Classic Rock's senior editor, Michael Gallucci, reflected on how the band's newest album sounds more like a "conventional" Who record, despite the album being thematically different from any of their previous works: "It's a throwback record for the most part, with nods all over the place to their classic work. It's not a retread, but it sounds like a Who album, which is crucial for something like this, as well as an upgrade for the 21st century."

== Cover artwork ==
The album cover was designed by pop artist Peter Blake, whose work includes the band's Face Dances and the Beatles' Sgt. Pepper's Lonely Hearts Club Band album covers. It is a patchwork of 25 squares: 22 squares showing different coloured images placed around three squares forming the word "WHO" in the centre of the album cover. The 22 squares depict some of the band's influences and symbols of their career and culture:

- A red AEC Routemaster bus (referring to both their 1968 single "Magic Bus" and its accompanying compilation album Magic Bus: The Who on Tour).
- Baked beans (a reminiscence of the band's 1967 The Who Sell Out album cover).
- Cultural figures such as musician Chuck Berry and boxer Muhammad Ali.
- A FunHouse pinball machine (a reminiscence of the band's 1969 track "Pinball Wizard").
- A Royal Air Force roundel (routinely used as a backdrop for the band's logo).
- A traffic sign reading "Detour", which is the fourth track on the album and a reference to the band's earlier name, the Detours.
- The band's 1979 The Kids Are Alright release advertisement poster featuring lead guitarist Pete Townshend on stage about to smash his Gibson Les Paul guitar, with the classic caption "This guitar has seconds to live."
- The Union Jack flag (sometimes used as a backdrop for the band's logo).
- A scooter (a nod to the mod culture and a reminiscence of the band's 1973 Quadrophenia album cover showing a mod scooter).
- Comic book characters Batman and Robin (a reminiscence of the band's cover of Neal Hefti's Batman theme on their first E.P. Ready Steady Who released in 1966).
- The band's 1981 Face Dances cassette edition album cover (designed by Richard Evans in association with Blake).

== Critical reception ==
Professional ratings
Aggregate scores
Source	Rating
Metacritic	79/100
Review scores
Source	Rating
AllMusic	4/5 stars
Classic Rock	4/5 stars
Consequence of Sound	B−
The Guardian	4/5 stars
The Independent	3/5 stars
Mojo	4/5 stars
NME	4/5 stars
Rolling Stone	3.5/5 stars
The Telegraph	4/5 stars
Uncut	9/10

Who has received generally positive reviews from critics. According to Metacritic scores, fans gave the album a 7.4/10 star rating, while critics gave the album a 79/100 score. Praise for the band's performance also resonated with critics. In the Chicago Tribune, Pablo Gorondi complimented Daltrey for, "sing(ing) with power, sensitivity, range and conviction, just as he has done for decades", and called Townshend's voice a "highlight", while still "rip(ping) power chords and perform(ing) slinky riffs". Gorondi continued his praise by stating that the dominant reasons why the album was "such a joy" were "Townshend's songwriting and guitar playing and Daltrey's superlative singing."

Despite the praises for its 1970s rock sound and Daltrey and Townshend's performances, Who has received criticism. According to Matthew Taub of Consequence of Sound, some tracks are "not particularly well conceived", citing songs such as "Detour" and "Hero Ground Zero", as "just sit(ting) there" or "feeling more like an intermission". Taub also commented that the track "Break the News", which was written by Townshend's younger brother, Simon, sounded like it was, "plucked from some kind of factory for generic acoustic pop songs — somehow like 100 other songs you’ve heard, yet none you can actually name."

Another observation was the generational tone of the album. Chris Willman from Variety stated, "There are hints of mirth amid the crotchetiness. Right in the opening line, when Daltrey sings 'I don't care, I know you're gonna hate this song,' followed later by 'I don't mind other guys ripping off my song.'" NME journalist, Mark Beaumont, similarly noted this theme with the track, "I Don't Wanna Get Wise": "...(it) almost reads like a 75-year-old Daltrey talking to the drunk and tardy 20-year-old who sang 'My Generation.'"

== Track listing ==
All songs written by Pete Townshend except where noted.

Standard edition
No.	Title	Writer(s)	Length
1.	"All This Music Must Fade"		3:20
2.	"Ball and Chain"		4:29
3.	"I Don't Wanna Get Wise"		3:54
4.	"Detour"		3:46
5.	"Beads on One String"	P. Townshend; Josh Hunsacker	3:40
6.	"Hero Ground Zero"		4:52
7.	"Street Song"		4:47
8.	"I'll Be Back"		5:01
9.	"Break the News"	Simon Townshend	4:30
10.	"Rockin' in Rage"		4:04
11.	"She Rocked My World"		3:22
Total length:			45:45

2019 deluxe edition bonus tracks
No.	Title	Length
12.	"This Gun Will Misfire"	3:36
13.	"Got Nothing to Prove"	3:38
14.	"Danny and My Ponies"	4:02
Total length:		57:01

2019 Japanese edition bonus track
No.	Title	Length
15.	"Sand" (Demo)	4:26
Total length:		61:34

"Sand" is a demo Pete Townshend recorded in 1966.

2020 deluxe edition bonus track
No.	Title	Writer(s)	Length
12.	"Beads on One String" (Yaggerdang Remix)	P. Townshend; Josh Hunsacker	3:38
Total length:			65:12

2020 deluxe edition CD 2 – Live at Kingston
No.	Title	Length
1.	"Intro"
2.	"Substitute"
3.	"Squeeze Box"
4.	"Tattoo"
5.	"The Kids Are Alright"
6.	"Break the News"
7.	"She Rocked My World"
8.	"Won't Get Fooled Again"

== Personnel ==
Adapted from compact disc liner notes and online liner notes.

=== The Who ===
- Roger Daltrey – lead vocals (except 8, 12–14)
- Pete Townshend – guitars, backing vocals, lead vocals (tracks 8, 12–14), harmonicas (4, 8), percussion (8), synthesiser tracks (8), violin (8), cello (8), hurdy-gurdy (8), effects; orchestration (6)

=== Additional personnel ===
- Pino Palladino – bass (1–2, 4–8, 11–12)
- Zak Starkey – drums (1–2, 4, 7)
- Simon Townshend – backing vocals (1, 3, 5), piano (9), percussion
- Benmont Tench – organ (1–2, 10), Mellotron (1)
- Joey Waronker – drums (5, 8, 11–12)
- Carla Azar – drums (3, 10)
- Matt Chamberlain – drums (6)
- Gus Seyffert – bass (3, 9–10)
- Andrew Synowiec – acoustic guitar (9)
- Gordon Giltrap – acoustic guitar (11)
- Dave Sardy – Mellotron, synthesiser programming (5), percussion
- Josh Tyrrell – handclaps (4)
- Rowan McIntosh – handclaps (4)
- Fergus Gerrand – percussion (11)
- Martin Batchelar – programming (6), orchestration (6, 8), orchestra arrangement (8), orchestra conducting (6, 8, 13)
- Rachel Fuller – orchestration (6)
- Peter Rotter – orchestra fixer (6, 8, 13)
- Bruce Dukov – orchestra leader (6, 8, 13)

== Charts ==
=== Weekly charts ===
Weekly chart performance for Who
Chart (2019)	Peak position
Australian Albums (ARIA)	64
Austrian Albums (Ö3 Austria)	14
Belgian Albums (Ultratop Flanders)	41
Belgian Albums (Ultratop Wallonia)	27
Canadian Albums (Billboard)	2
Czech Albums (ČNS IFPI)	81
Dutch Albums (Album Top 100)	38
Finnish Albums (Suomen virallinen lista)	19
French Albums (SNEP)	43
German Albums (Offizielle Top 100)	5
Irish Albums (IRMA)	28
Italian Albums (FIMI)	35
Japanese Hot Albums (Billboard Japan)	51
Japanese Albums (Oricon)	31
Scottish Albums (Official Charts)	2
Spanish Albums (Promusicae)	23
Swedish Albums (Sverigetopplistan)	27
Swiss Albums (Schweizer Hitparade)	5
UK Albums (Official Charts)	3
US Billboard 200	2
US Top Rock Albums (Billboard)	1

=== Year-end charts ===
2019 year-end chart performance for Who
Chart (2019)	Position
UK Albums (OCC)	82

2020 year-end chart performance for Who
Chart (2020)	Position
German Albums (Offizielle Top 100)	81
US Top Rock Albums (Billboard)	49

== Certifications ==
Certifications for Who
Region	Certification	Certified units/sales
United Kingdom (BPI)	Gold	100,000^{‡}
^{‡} Sales+streaming figures based on certification alone.
