= Ball and Chain (The Who song) =

Single by the Who

from the album Who
- Released: 13 September 2019
- Recorded: 2019
- Genre: Blues rock
- Length: 4:29
- Label: Polydor
- Songwriter: Pete Townshend

The Who singles chronology
"Be Lucky" (2014)	"Ball and Chain" (2019)	"All This Music Must Fade" (2019)

"Ball and Chain" is a song written by Pete Townshend and performed by the English rock band the Who, appearing as the second track on their twelfth studio album Who (2019). The song is a re-recording of a Townshend solo song called "Guantanamo", which was released on his 2015 compilation album Truancy: The Very Best of Pete Townshend.

The song was the lead single released from Who, and was one of three singles that promoted the album. It is about the Guantanamo Bay detention camp in Cuba.

The song is a blues rock track led by Townshend's acoustic guitar, and it is sung by lead vocalist Roger Daltrey. The song was debuted at the band's concert at London's Wembley Stadium on 6 July 2019, though at that time its title was "Big Cigars".
