= Scot Halpin =

American drummer

Background information
- Born: Thomas Scot Halpin; February 3, 1954; Muscatine, Iowa, U.S.
- Died: February 9, 2008 (aged 54) Bloomington, Indiana, U.S.
- Genres: Rock
- Occupation: Musician
- Instrument: Drums
- Years active: 1973
- Formerly of: The Who

Thomas Scot Halpin (February 3, 1954 – February 9, 2008) was an American artist and musician. In 1973, having initially been a member of the audience at a concert by the Who at the Cow Palace in Daly City, California, he ended up playing drums onstage after the band's drummer Keith Moon passed out mid-show. Halpin's performance won him Rolling Stone's "Pick-Up Player of the Year Award" later that year.

== Education and career ==
Halpin was born in Muscatine, Iowa, to Elizabeth and Richard Halpin, of Muscatine. He grew up in Muscatine, showing early promise as a visual artist and musician. In the early 1970s, he moved to California, where he met his wife and life-time collaborator Robin Young at City College of San Francisco in 1978. Halpin went on to earn an MA in Interdisciplinary Arts from San Francisco State University.

Halpin became composer in residence at the Headlands Center for the Arts, in Sausalito, California, and played with a number of bands. While on the West Coast, Halpin and his wife managed a new wave punk rock night club, The Roosevelt, before moving to Indiana in 1995 to pursue opportunities in the visual arts.

=== Playing with the Who ===
On November 20, 1973, the Who were opening their Quadrophenia US concert tour at the Cow Palace in Daly City, a suburb just south of San Francisco. Halpin had recently moved to the area from Muscatine, Iowa and was there with a friend, Mike Danese, using tickets they had bought from a stranger. As big fans of the band, they arrived at the show long before the doors opened to get good seats.

The Who opened the show with three of their earlier hits before launching into material from Quadrophenia, playing eleven of the album's 17 songs and then continuing on to other hits. About 70 minutes into the show, drummer Keith Moon, a heavy user of drugs and alcohol, began to falter during "Won't Get Fooled Again", then suddenly slumped over his drum kit, and was helped off by roadies while the other members of the band finished the song as best they could without him. Backstage, Moon was placed in a cold shower by the roadies in an attempt to revive him. Their efforts worked, and an injection of cortisone got him back onstage after a delay of approximately 30 minutes.

Moon having returned, the show continued with "Magic Bus". The percussion of the song's opening verses consisted only of Moon hitting two wooden blocks against one another. However, at the song's conclusion, Moon passed out again, slumping onto his drums. He was carried off again—this time not to return. Guitarist Pete Townshend later said in an interview that Moon had consumed ketamine pills, together with a large volume of brandy.

The remaining three band members then played a short jam, before going into "See Me, Feel Me", without drums, with vocalist Roger Daltrey adding a tambourine for percussion. The song received a huge response, and Pete Townshend apologized to the crowd and thanked them for putting up with a three-quarter-strength band, saying "I think it should be us applauding you". Townshend then asked the crowd, "Can anybody play the drums?" He repeated the question, adding, "I mean somebody good!"

At this time, Halpin and Danese were at the left edge of the stage, and Danese told the security staff, "He can play!" In truth, Halpin was lacking practice and had not played drums in a year, but Danese attracted the attention of the concert's promoter, Bill Graham.

Graham just looked at me and said, "Can you do it?" And I said, "Yes," straight out. Townshend and Daltrey look around at me and they're as surprised as I am, because Graham put me up there.

Halpin was given a small shot of brandy for his nerves before taking his place behind his first drum kit since leaving Iowa.

Then I got really focused, and Townshend said to me, "You'll be fine. I'm going to lead you. I'm going to cue you.

Townshend shook Halpin's hand as he sat down. Moon's drum roadie, Mick Double, pointed out to Halpin that the hi-hat pedal was locked closed because Moon instead used both feet for his two bass drums. Daltrey introduced Halpin to the audience as "Scott", and went straight into the riff of "Smokestack Lightning". This was a very loose blues jam, Halpin's competent drum work fitting in well enough, and it shortly became "Spoonful". Less successful, however, was his contribution to the more complex "Naked Eye", and he struggled to provide the contrasting tempos, despite Townshend attempting to give him instructions. Halpin did not appear at all flustered, though, and established a steady beat throughout. The show ended after "Naked Eye", and Halpin took a center-stage bow with Daltrey, Townshend, and bass guitarist John Entwistle. Afterwards, he was taken backstage, along with his friend Mike, joined the band for a drink and snacks, and was given a Who concert jacket, which Halpin said was stolen from him later that night. Despite Moon's collapse, the concert lasted around the same length as most Who gigs at this time.

Halpin said he was told he would be paid $1,000 for the gig, but he never got a check. He did, however, get a thank you note from Townshend years later.

In later interviews, Daltrey talked about the evening, saying: "Pete took Keith's passing out on stage in his stride, he kind of expected it might happen one day, but I was bloody angry with Keith for days afterwards. I thought he'd let everyone down." Daltrey also praised Halpin's ability, saying that the "papers missed it. He did a good job". Interviewed by Rolling Stone, Halpin admired the Who's great stamina, saying: "I only played three numbers and I was dead."

== Death ==
From 1995 until his death, Halpin resided in Bloomington, Indiana, with his wife Robin and son, James. He died on February 9, 2008, of an inoperable non-malignant brain tumor.

On January 27, 2009, the Who posted a tribute and a link on their official website announcing a blog in Halpin's memory. In September 2017, an event to celebrate Halpin's life and work was held in Bloomington.
