= Drowned (song) =

Song by the Who

from the album Quadrophenia
- Released: 19 October 1973
- Recorded: May 1972 and June 1973
- Studio: Olympic, London (except "The Kitchen" in Battersea, London in Ronnie Lane's Mobile Studio)
- Genre: Rock; hard rock
- Length: 5:26
- Label: Track/Polydor (UK); Track/MCA (US)
- Songwriter: Pete Townshend
- Producers: The Who; Kit Lambert; Glyn Johns

"Drowned" is a song written by Pete Townshend, the guitarist for the Who, for their sixth studio album, Quadrophenia (1973).

== Lyrics and music ==
Music critic Chris Charlesworth describes "Drowned" as a "tough blues-based rocker". He states that the band loved to play it live since it was less complex than other songs from Quadrophenia. Rolling Stone critic Dave Marsh describes the song as among the most interesting on the album. Who biographer John Atkins views the song as having "such purity of essence" that it may be the "quintessential Quadrophenia performance". He describes it as being "simple and direct" without needed "cleverness, dramatic musical effects or complex arrangements".

The oldest song featuring on Quadrophenia ("Joker James", though hailing from the Tommy era, did not feature on the album), "Drowned" was initially written as an ode to Meher Baba in early 1970. Townshend sang it facing the tomb of Meher Baba on his first visit to India in January 1972.

"When the tragic hero of Q[uadrophenia] sings it, it is desperate and nihilistic. In fact, it's a love song, God's love being the ocean and our 'selves' being the drops of water that make it up. Meher Baba said, 'I am the Ocean of Love.' I want to drown in that ocean, the 'drop' will then be an ocean itself."

— Pete Townshend

In Quadrophenia, "Drowned" tells of how Jimmy contemplates drowning himself in the water, in the midst of his disappointment at not being able to see his hero, the Ace Face. At the end, seagulls, crowd noises and waves can be heard, along with Pete Townshend walking along singing the sixth verse of "Sea and Sand". Mike Segretto interprets the water in the song as a metaphor for God and the song itself as a metaphor for the search for spirituality, or the "quest for a tributary leading to God". Steve Grantley and Alan G. Parker interpret the song similarly. According to them, in the song Jimmy sees the ocean "as a symbol of cleansing redemption". Atkins interprets the song as representing the "freedom of release", both in the lyrics and in the music. Atkins also notes that in the song Jimmy adopts a "wider philosophy than mod conformism", which is his objective through much of the album.

The piano part was borrowed from Joe Cocker's song "Hitchcock Railway". Charlesworth praises Chris Stainton's "great piano work."

== Recording ==
In an amazing coincidence, the studio that "Drowned" was recorded in was flooded just after the song was recorded.

When recording this song it rained so hard in Battersea where our studio is that the walls were flowing with sheets of water. Chris Stainton played piano in a booth and when the take was finished he opened the door and about 500 gallons gushed out! Another glorious coincidence.

— Pete Townshend

== Live performances ==
"Drowned" is one of the most played songs by the Who from Quadrophenia, being played throughout their tours, and because it required no backing tapes, it was often performed as a full band jam. Though Roger Daltrey sang it on the original recording and the original Quadrophenia tour in 1973, Pete Townshend took over lead vocals after the death of Keith Moon in 1978, while Daltrey played a blues harmonica throughout the song. From the 1996-97 tours to 2012, it was played as an acoustic-guitar-only solo performance by Townshend. The 2012-2013 Quadrophenia and More tour featured a full band arrangement of "Drowned" with Townshend on lead vocals.

=== The Who albums and videos featuring "Drowned" ===
In order of release;

- Quadrophenia
- Hooligans
- Thirty Years of Maximum R&B Live
- Live at the Royal Albert Hall/The Who & Special Guests: Live at the Royal Albert Hall
- Tommy and Quadrophenia Live
- Live from Toronto
- Quadrophenia Live in London

== Cover versions ==
The jam band Phish covered "Drowned" and the rest of Quadrophenia at their Halloween 1995 concert, which can be heard on Live Phish Volume 14. "Drowned" and the song "Sea and Sand" are also on their live album New Year's Eve 1995 – Live at Madison Square Garden, and Phish have played an extended version of "Drowned" in several of their concerts since.

== Personnel ==
- Roger Daltrey – lead vocals
- Pete Townshend – guitar
- John Entwistle – bass guitar, French horn
- Keith Moon – drums
- Chris Stainton – piano
