= Encore Series =

Album

The Encore Series are concert recordings developed initially in 2002 through a partnership between the Who and TheMusic.com. The series was created as legal alternative to bootlegs of major artists' complete concert tours. Each series is authorised by the artists, and recorded directly from the artists' sound board. The recordings are typically released as a series of individual CD albums, one recording for each tour date, along with a boxed set containing each show's recording. All profits from the series go to charitable causes.

== Releases ==
- The Who – Encore Series 2002, Encore Series 2004, Encore Series 2006, Encore Series 2007, Live at Lyon, and Live in Boston
- Duran Duran – Encore Series 2003
- Peter Gabriel – Encore Series 2003, Encore Series 2004, Encore Series 2007, Encore Series 2009, Encore Series 2012, Encore Series 2013, Encore Series 2014 and Encore Series 2014-winter.
- Genesis – Encore Series 2007 and Live over Europe 2007
