= Sea and Sand =

Song by The Who

Song by the Who

from the album Quadrophenia
- Released: 1973
- Length: 5:01
- Label: MCA
- Songwriter: Pete Townshend

"Sea and Sand" is a song by the English rock band the Who. It was released on the group's 1973 rock opera album Quadrophenia, where it is the second track of the third side of the record.

== Lyrics and music ==
The first song to take place once Quadrophenia's narrative moves to Brighton, "Sea and Sand" portrays opera protagonist Jimmy's affinity for the beach as an escape from the unpleasant realities of home and life, as well as his memories from past mod gatherings at Brighton. With singing by both Roger Daltrey and Pete Townshend, slow dreamy parts and fast angry parts, and a coda that reprises the early Who single "I'm the Face", "Sea and Sand" is almost a mini-opera unto itself, and is one of the album's most characteristic tracks. It is one of four songs on the album to reference the mod movement.

"Sea and Sand" also marks a point of reflection in the narrative. After the protagonist leaves home, he is left on the beach. He reflects about his inadequacy in love and inability to fit in at home or with the other tickets and faces within the Mod subculture. The song also speaks to Townshend's growing alienation from his band and the music scene as a whole. As such, it serves as a telling sign of the years to come and the state of the Who during and directly after this period.

Arriving at Brighton, Jimmy brightens up a bit...get the pun? He talks about rows at home and is a little sarcastic as he recalls the evening on the beach with his former girlfriend. This is 1965 and the Mod scene is already falling apart - and what does he do but go to Brighton just to remember. The crazy days when 300,000 Mod kids from London descended on that little beach town were only three weeks ago, but he's already living in the past.

— Pete Townshend

== Reception ==
While not released as a single, the song gained significant airplay on progressive rock radio; Richard Neer of WNEW-FM in New York labeled it the album's best. "Sea and Sand" remains a fan favourite, and the line "Here by the sea and sand/Nothing ever goes as planned" is a well-remembered Who lyric. Indeed, following The Who's 1996 performances of Quadrophenia at Madison Square Garden, fans sung that and other lines from the song as they were leaving the arena.

== Covers ==
The song was memorably treated by keyboardist Page McConnell of the jam band Phish in their 1995 concert album, Phish: New Year's Eve 1995 - Live at Madison Square Garden. An acoustic version was released in 2001 on the album The Legends Collection: Acoustic.
