= The Who & Special Guests: Live at the Royal Albert Hall =

- Directed by: Dick Carruthers
- Produced by: Pierre Lamoureux
- Starring: The Who; Roger Daltrey; John Entwistle; Pete Townshend; John Bundrick; Zak Starkey; Nigel Kennedy; Paul Weller; Eddie Vedder; Bryan Adams; Noel Gallagher; Kelly Jones
- Music by: The Who
- Production company: Image
- Distributed by: Image
- Release dates: 25 September 2001 (U.S.); 28 July 2003 (UK)
- Running time: 144 min.
- Country: United Kingdom
- Language: English

The Who & Special Guests: Live at the Royal Albert Hall is a concert film of the Who's concert on 27 November 2000 at the Royal Albert Hall in London to benefit the Teenage Cancer Trust. A number of special guests joined the band on stage to perform the band's hits. The concert was also released on CD as Live at the Royal Albert Hall (2003).

== Songs performed ==
1. "I Can't Explain"
2. "Anyway, Anyhow, Anywhere"
3. "Pinball Wizard"
4. "Relay"
5. "My Wife"
6. "The Kids Are Alright"
7. "Bargain"
8. "Magic Bus"
9. "Who Are You"
10. "Baba O'Riley" (with Nigel Kennedy)
11. "Drowned"
12. "Heart to Hang Onto"
13. "So Sad About Us" (Pete Townshend and Paul Weller)
14. "I'm One" (with Eddie Vedder)
15. "Behind Blue Eyes" (with Bryan Adams)
16. "You Better You Bet"
17. "The Real Me"
18. "5:15"
19. "Won't Get Fooled Again" (with Noel Gallagher)
20. "Substitute" (with Kelly Jones)
21. "Let's See Action" (with Eddie Vedder)
22. "My Generation"
23. "See Me, Feel Me/Listening to You" (with Eddie Vedder and Bryan Adams)

Note: "Mary Anne with the Shaky Hand" and "Getting in Tune" (with Eddie Vedder) were also performed, but were not released on the DVD. They were later included on the audio CD release of this show.

== Special features ==
Also included on the DVD is backstage and rehearsal footage, an interview with Roger Daltrey, and a multi-angle view of "Pinball Wizard".

== Certifications ==
Region	Certification	Certified units/sales
Australia (ARIA)	Platinum	15,000^{^}
^{^} Shipments figures based on certification alone.
