= Quadrophenia =

Studio album by the Who
- Released: 26 October 1973
- Recorded: May–June 1972; May–September 1973
- Studios: Olympic, Ramport and Ronnie Lane's Mobile Studio, London
- Genres: Hard rock; art rock
- Length: 81:42
- Labels: Track (UK); Track/MCA (US)
- Producer: The Who

The Who chronology
Meaty Beaty Big and Bouncy (1971)	Quadrophenia (1973)	Odds & Sods (1974)

Singles from Quadrophenia
- 1. "5:15" Released: October 1973 (UK); 2. "Love, Reign o'er Me" Released: October 1973 (US); 3. "The Real Me" Released: January 1974

Quadrophenia is the sixth studio album by the English rock band the Who, released as a double album on 26 October 1973 by Track Records. It is the group's third rock opera, the previous two being the "mini-opera" song "A Quick One, While He's Away" (1966) and the album Tommy (1969). Set in London and Brighton in 1965, the story follows a young mod named Jimmy and his search for self-worth and importance. Quadrophenia is the only Who album entirely written by Pete Townshend.

The group started work on the album in 1972 in an attempt to follow up Tommy and Who's Next (1971), both of which had achieved substantial critical and commercial success. Recording was delayed while bassist John Entwistle and singer Roger Daltrey recorded solo albums and drummer Keith Moon worked on films. Because their new studio was not finished in time, the group had to use Ronnie Lane's Mobile Studio. The album makes significant use of Townshend's multi-track synthesizers and sound effects, as well as Entwistle's layered horn parts. Relationships between the group and manager Kit Lambert broke down irretrievably during recording, and he had left the band's service by the time the album was released.

Quadrophenia was released to a positive reception in both the UK and the US, but the resulting tour was marred with problems with backing tapes replacing the additional instruments on the album, and the stage piece was retired in early 1974. It was revived in 1996 with a larger ensemble, and a further tour took place in 2012. The album made a positive impact on the mod revival movement of the late 1970s, and the resulting 1979 film adaptation was successful. The album has been reissued on compact disc several times, and seen several remixes that corrected some perceived flaws in the original release.

== Plot ==
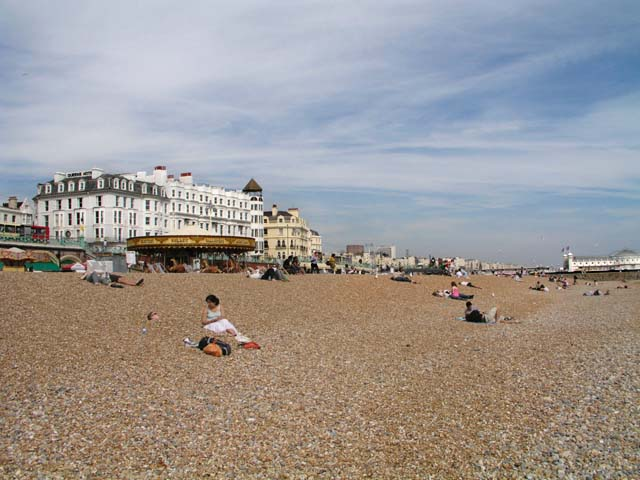
The second half of Quadrophenia takes place on and around Brighton Beach.

The original release of Quadrophenia came with a set of recording notes for reviewers and journalists that explained the basic story and plot.

The narrative centres on a young working-class mod named Jimmy. He likes drugs, beach fights and romance, and becomes a fan of the Who after a concert in Brighton, but is disillusioned by his parents' attitude towards him, dead-end jobs and an unsuccessful trip to see a psychiatrist. He clashes with his parents over his use of amphetamines, and has difficulty finding regular work and doubts his own self-worth, quitting a job as a dustman after only two days. Though he is happy to be "one" of the mods, he struggles to keep up with his peers, and his girlfriend leaves him for his best friend.

After destroying his scooter and contemplating suicide, he decides to take a train to Brighton, where he had enjoyed earlier experiences with fellow mods. However, he discovers the "Ace Face" who led the gang now has a menial job as a bellboy in a hotel. He feels everything in his life has rejected him, steals a boat, and uses it to sail out to a rock overlooking the sea. On the rock and stuck in the rain, he contemplates his life. The ending is left ambiguous as to what happens to Jimmy.

== Background ==
The year 1972 was the least active year for the Who since they had formed. The group had achieved great commercial and critical success with the albums Tommy and Who's Next, but were struggling to come up with a suitable follow-up. The group recorded new material with Who's Next collaborator Glyn Johns in May 1972, including "Is It in My Head" and "Love Reign O'er Me" which were eventually released on Quadrophenia, and a mini-opera called "Long Live Rock – Rock Is Dead", but the material was considered too derivative of Who's Next and sessions were abandoned. In an interview for Melody Maker, guitarist and bandleader Pete Townshend said, "I've got to get a new act together… People don't really want to sit and listen to all our past." He had become frustrated that the group had been unable to produce a film of Tommy (a film version of Tommy was eventually released in 1975) or Lifehouse (the abortive project that resulted in Who's Next), and decided to follow Frank Zappa's idea of producing a musical soundtrack that could produce a narrative in the same way as a film. Unlike Tommy, the new work had to be grounded in reality and tell a story of youth and adolescence that the audience could relate to.

Townshend became inspired by "Long Live Rock – Rock Is Dead"'s theme and in autumn 1972 began writing material, while the group put out unreleased recordings including "Join Together" and "Relay" to keep themselves in the public eye. In the meantime, bassist John Entwistle released his second solo album, Whistle Rymes, singer Roger Daltrey worked on solo material, and Keith Moon featured as a drummer in the film That'll Be the Day. Townshend had met up with "Irish" Jack Lyons, one of the original Who fans, which gave him the idea of writing a piece that would look back on the group's history and its audience. He created the character of Jimmy from an amalgamation of six early fans of the group, including Lyons, and gave the character a four-way split personality, which led to the album's title (a play on schizophrenia). Unlike other Who albums, Townshend insisted on composing the entire work, though he deliberately made the initial demos sparse and incomplete so that the other group members could contribute to the finished arrangement.

Work was interrupted for most of 1972 in order to work on Lou Reizner's orchestral version of Tommy. Daltrey finished his first solo album, which included the hit single "Giving It All Away", fueling rumours of a split in the press. Things were not helped when Daltrey discovered that managers Kit Lambert and Chris Stamp had large sums of money unaccounted for and suggested they should be fired, which Townshend resisted.

== Recording ==
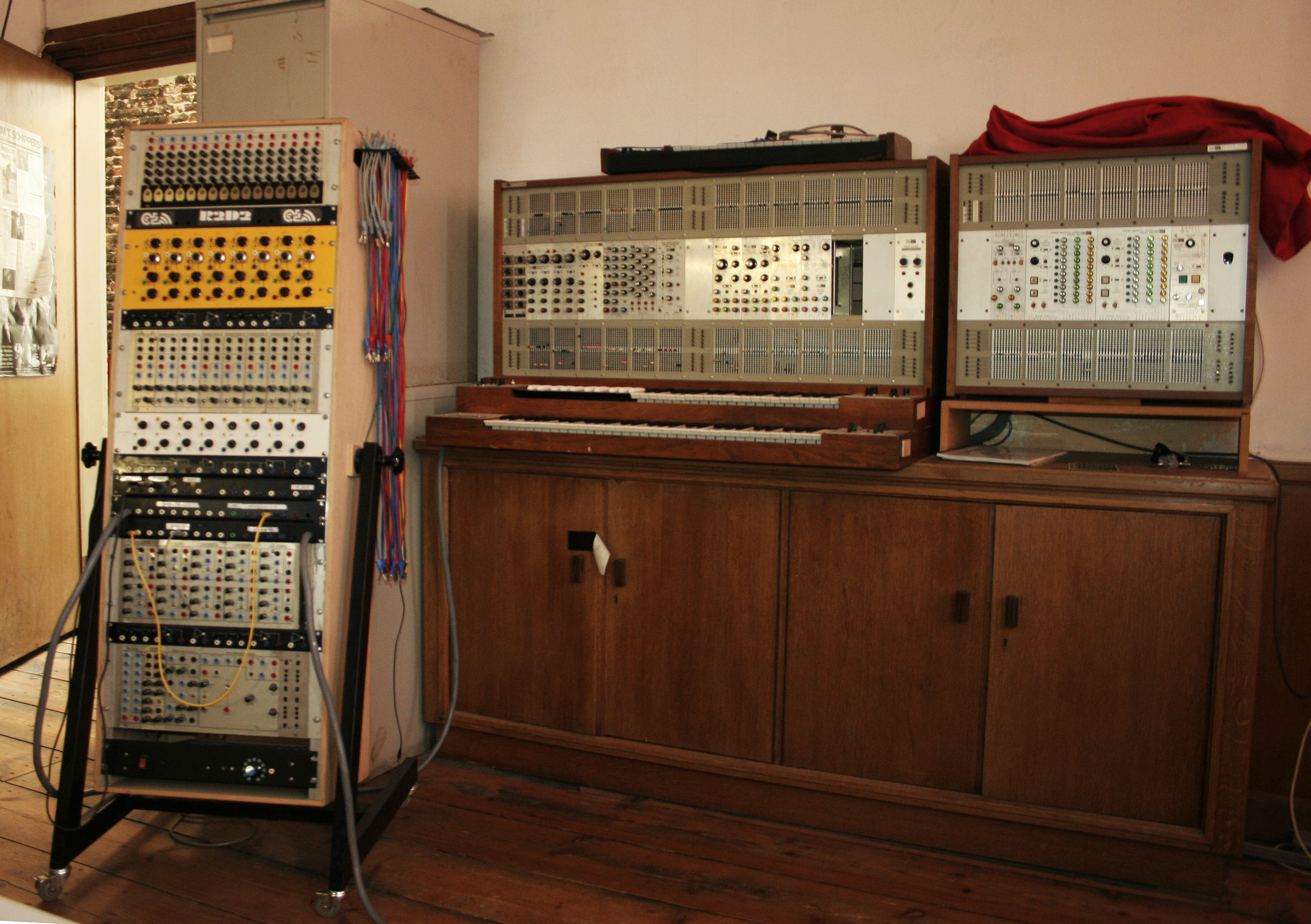
Pete Townshend used the ARP 2500 synthesizer extensively on Quadrophenia, and several tracks include the instrument overdubbed many times.

In order to do justice to the recording of Quadrophenia, the group decided to build their own studio, Ramport Studios in Battersea. Work started on building Ramport in November 1972, but five months later it still lacked an adequate mixing desk that could handle recording Quadrophenia. Instead, Townshend's friend Ronnie Lane, bassist for Faces, loaned his mobile studio for the sessions. Lambert ostensibly began producing the album in May, but missed recording sessions and generally lacked discipline. By mid-1973, Daltrey demanded that Lambert leave the Who's services. The band recruited engineer Ron Nevison, who had worked with Townshend's associate John Alcock, to assist with engineering.

To illustrate the four-way split personality of Jimmy, Townshend wrote four themes, reflecting the four members of the Who. These were "Bell Boy" (Moon), "Is It Me?" (Entwistle), "Helpless Dancer" (Daltrey) and "Love Reign O'er Me" (Townshend). Two lengthy instrumentals on the album, the title track and "The Rock", contain the four themes, separately and together. The instrumentals were not demoed but built up in the studio. Who author John Atkins described the instrumental tracks as "the most ambitious and intricate music the group ever undertook."

Most tracks involved each of the group recording their parts separately; unlike earlier albums, Townshend had left space in his demos for other band members to contribute, though most of the synthesizers on the finished album came from his ARP 2500 synthesizer and were recorded at home. The only song arranged by the band in the studio was "5:15". According to Nevison, the ARP 2500 was impossible to record in the studio, and changing sounds was cumbersome due to a lack of patches, which required Townshend to work on these parts at home, working late into the night. To obtain a good string section sound on the album, Townshend bought a cello and over two weeks learned how to play it well enough to be recorded.

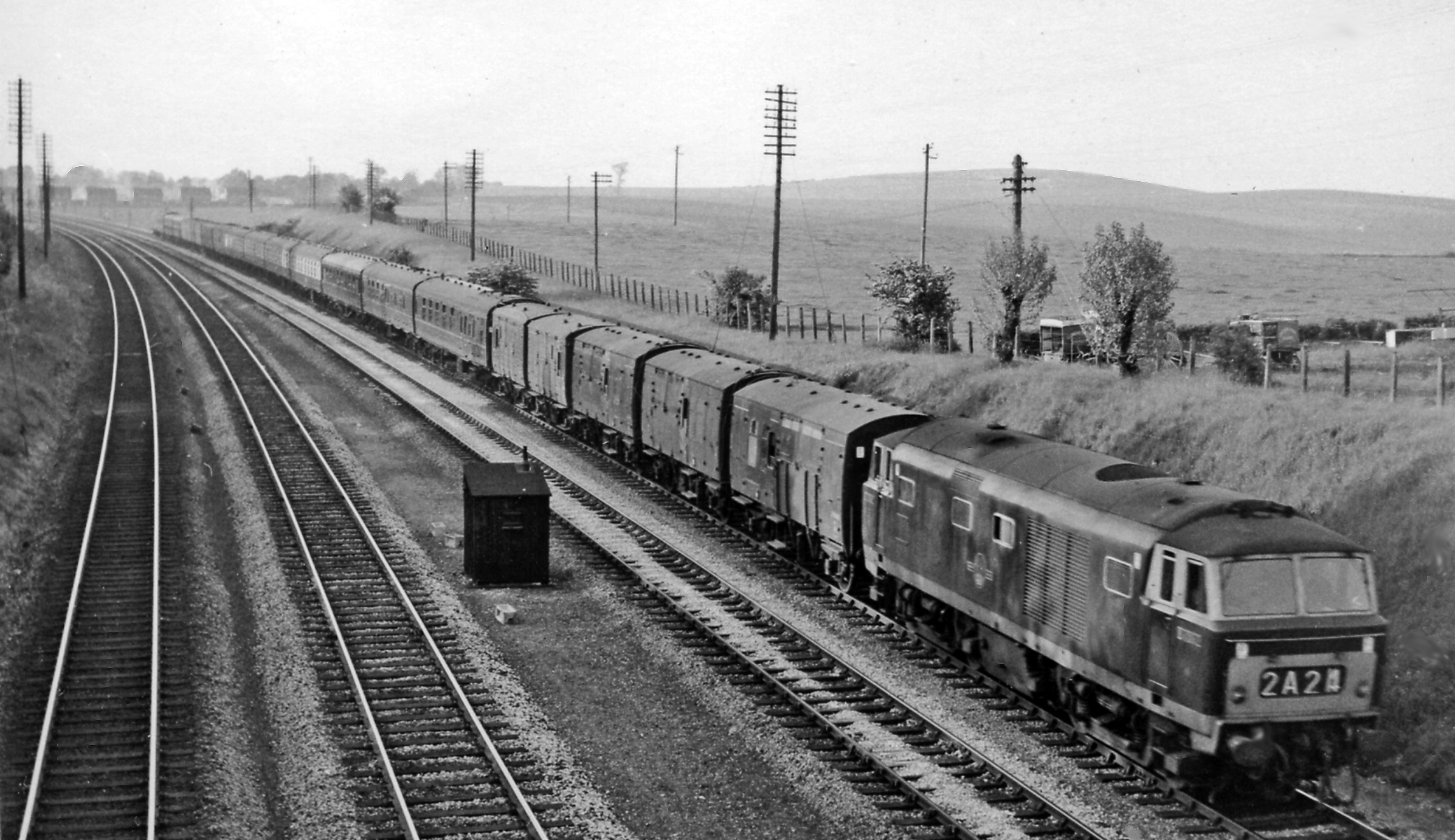
Townshend recorded the whistle of a diesel train near his home in Goring-on-Thames as one of the album's sound effects.

Entwistle recorded his bass part to "The Real Me" in one take on a Gibson Thunderbird and spent several weeks during the summer arranging and recording numerous multi-tracked horn parts. Having been forced to play more straightforwardly by Johns on Who's Next, Moon returned to his established drumming style on Quadrophenia. He contributed lead vocals to "Bell Boy", where he deliberately showcased an exaggerated narrative style. For the finale of "Love, Reign O'er Me", Townshend and Nevison set up a large group of percussion instruments, which Moon played before kicking over a set of tubular bells, which can be heard on the final mix.

During the album production, Townshend made many field recordings with a portable reel-to-reel recorder. These included waves washing on a Cornish beach and the doppler whistle of a diesel train recorded near Townshend's house at Goring-on-Thames. The ending of "The Dirty Jobs" includes a musical excerpt from The Thunderer, a march by John Philip Sousa, which Nevison recorded while watching a brass band play in Regent's Park. Assembling the field recordings in the studio was problematic; at one point, during "I Am the Sea", nine tape machines were running sound effects. According to Nevison, Townshend produced the album single-handedly, adding that "everything started when Pete got there, and everything finished when Pete left". Townshend began mixing the album in August at his home studio in Goring along with Nevison.

== Release ==
The album was preceded by the single "5:15" in the UK, which benefited from a live appearance on Top of the Pops on 4 October 1973 and was released the next day. It reached No. 20 in the charts. In the US, "Love Reign O'er Me" was chosen as the lead single.

Quadrophenia was originally released in North America on 26 October and in the UK on 29 October, but fans found it difficult to find a copy due to a shortage of vinyl caused by the OPEC oil embargo. In the UK, Quadrophenia reached No. 2, being held off the top spot by David Bowie's Pin Ups. (Note: Ironically, Pin Ups contained cover versions of the Who songs "I Can't Explain" and "Anyway, Anyhow, Anywhere".) The album reached No. 2 on the US Billboard chart, the highest position of any Who album in that country, being kept from No. 1 by Elton John's Goodbye Yellow Brick Road.

The album was originally released as a two-LP set with a gatefold jacket and a booklet containing lyrics, a text version of the story, and photographs taken by Ethan Russell illustrating it. MCA Records re-released the album as a two-CD set in 1985 with the lyrics and text storyline on a thin fold-up sheet but none of the photographs. The album was reissued as a remastered CD in 1996, featuring a reproduction of the original album artwork. The original mix had been criticised in particular for Daltrey's vocals being buried, so the 1996 CD was completely remixed by Jon Astley and Andy Macpherson.

In 2011, Townshend and longtime Who engineer Bob Pridden remixed the album, resulting in a deluxe five-disc box set. Unlike earlier reissues, this set contains two discs of demos, including some songs that were dropped from the final running order of the album, and a selection of songs in 5.1 surround sound. The box set came with a 100-page book including an essay by Townshend about the album sessions, with photos. At the same time, the standard two-CD version was re-released with a selection of the demos as bonus content; some Disc Two tracks were moved to Disc One to accommodate space for these demos. In 2014, the album was released on Blu-ray Audio featuring a brand-new remix of the entire album by Townshend and Pridden in 5.1 surround sound as well the 2011 Deluxe Edition stereo remix and the original 1973 stereo LP mix.

== Critical reception ==
Professional ratings
Review scores
Source	Rating
AllMusic	5/5 stars
Christgau's Record Guide	A−
Clash	10/10
Digital Spy	4/5 stars
The Encyclopedia of Popular Music	4/5 stars
MusicHound Rock	4/5
The Rolling Stone Album Guide	4/5 stars

Critical reaction to Quadrophenia was positive. Melody Maker's Chris Welch wrote "rarely have a group succeeded in distilling their essence and embracing a motif as convincingly", while Charles Shaar Murray described the album in New Musical Express as the "most rewarding musical experience of the year". Reaction in the US was generally positive, though Dave Marsh, writing in Creem gave a more critical response. Lenny Kaye wrote in Rolling Stone that "the Who as a whole have never sounded better" but added, "on its own terms, Quadrophenia falls short of the mark". In a year-end top albums list for Newsday, Robert Christgau ranked it seventh, and found it exemplary of how 1973's best records "fail to reward casual attention. They demand concentration, just like museum and textbook art."

Retrospective reviews were also positive. Writing in Christgau's Record Guide: Rock Albums of the Seventies (1981), Christgau regarded Quadrophenia as more of an opera than Tommy, possessing a brilliantly written albeit confusing plot, jarring but melodic music, and compassionate lyrics about "everykid as heroic fuckup, smart enough to have a good idea of what's being done to him and so sensitive he gets pushed right out to the edge anyway." Chris Jones, writing for BBC Music, said "everything great about The Who is contained herein." In 2013, Billboard, reviewing the album for its 40th anniversary, said: "Filled with performances packed with life and depth and personality, 'Quadrophenia' is 90 minutes of the Who at its very best." The album has sold 1 million copies and has been certified Platinum by the Recording Industry Association of America. In 2000 Q magazine placed Quadrophenia at No. 56 in its list of the 100 Greatest British Albums Ever. The album has been ranked at No. 267 on Rolling Stone magazine's list of the 500 greatest albums of all time. It is also ranked at No. 86 on VH1's list of the 100 greatest albums of all time.

Townshend now considers Quadrophenia to be the last great album that the Who recorded. In 2011, he said the group "never recorded anything that was so ambitious or audacious again", and implied that it was the last album to feature good playing by Keith Moon.

== Live performances ==
=== 1973–1974 tour ===
The band toured in support of Quadrophenia but immediately encountered difficulties playing the material live. To achieve the rich overdubbed sound of the album on stage, Townshend wanted Chris Stainton (who had played piano on some tracks) to join as a touring member. Daltrey objected to this and believed the Who's performances should only have the four core members. To obtain the required instrumentation without additional musicians, the group elected to employ taped backing tracks for live performance, supervised and operated by their regular live sound engineer Bob Pridden, as they had already done for "Baba O'Riley" and "Won't Get Fooled Again". Initial performances were however plagued by malfunctioning equipment. Once the tapes started, the band had to play to them, which constrained their styles. Moon, in particular, found playing Quadrophenia difficult as he was forced to stick to a click track instead of watching the rest of the band. The group only allowed two days of rehearsals with the tapes before touring, one of which was abandoned after Daltrey punched Townshend following an argument.

The tour started on 28 October 1973. The original plan had been to play most of the album, but after the first gig at Stoke-on-Trent, the band dropped "The Dirty Jobs", "Is It in My Head" and "I've Had Enough" from the set. Both Daltrey and Townshend felt they had to describe the plot in detail to the audience, which took up valuable time on stage. A few shows later in Newcastle upon Tyne, the backing tapes to "5:15" came in late. Townshend stopped the show, grabbed Bob Pridden, who was controlling the mixing desk, and dragged him onstage, shouting obscenities at him. Townshend subsequently picked up some of the tapes and threw them over the stage, kicked his amplifier over, and walked off. The band returned 20 minutes later, playing older material. Townshend and Moon appeared on local television the following day and attempted to brush things off. The Who played two other shows in Newcastle without incident.

The US tour started on 20 November at the Cow Palace in San Francisco. The group were nervous about playing Quadrophenia after the British tour, especially Moon. Before the show, he was offered some tranquillisers from a fan. Just after the show started, the fan collapsed and was hospitalised. Moon's playing, meanwhile, became incredibly erratic, particularly during Quadrophenia where he did not seem to be able to keep time with the backing tapes. Towards the end of the show, during "Won't Get Fooled Again", he passed out over his drumkit. After a 20-minute wait, Moon reappeared onstage, but after a few bars of "Magic Bus", collapsed again, and was immediately taken to hospital. Scot Halpin, an audience member, convinced promoter Bill Graham to let him play drums, and the group closed the show with him. Moon had a day to recover, and by the next show at the Los Angeles Forum, was playing at his usual strength. The group began to get used to the backing tapes, and the remainder of gigs for the US tour were successful.

The tour continued in February 1974, with a short series of gigs in France. The final show at the Palais de Sports in Lyon on the 24th was the last time Quadrophenia was played as a stage piece with Moon, who died in 1978. Townshend later said that Daltrey "ended up hating Quadrophenia – probably because it had bitten back". However, a small selection of songs remained in the set list; live performances of "Drowned" and "Bell Boy" filmed at Charlton Athletic football ground on 18 May were later released on the 30 Years of Maximum R&B box set.

=== 1996–1997 tour ===
In June 1996, Daltrey, Townshend and Entwistle revived Quadrophenia as a live concert. They performed at Hyde Park, London as part of the Prince's Trust "Masters of Music" benefit concert, playing most of the album for the first time since 1974. The concert was not billed as the Who, but credited to the three members individually. The performance also included Gary Glitter as the Godfather, Phil Daniels as the Narrator and Jimmy, Trevor MacDonald as the newsreader, Adrian Edmondson as the Bell Boy and Stephen Fry as the hotel manager. The musical lineup included Townshend's brother Simon, Zak Starkey on drums (his first appearance with the Who), guitarists David Gilmour (who played the bus driver) and Geoff Whitehorn, keyboardists John "Rabbit" Bundrick and Jon Carin, percussionist Jody Linscott, Billy Nicholls leading a two-man/two-woman backing vocal section, and five brass players. During rehearsals, Daltrey was struck in the face by Glitter's microphone stand, and performed the concert wearing an eyepatch.

A subsequent tour of the US and UK followed, employing most of the same players but with Billy Idol replacing Edmondson, Simon Townshend replacing Gilmour and P. J. Proby replacing Glitter during the second half of the tour. 85,000 fans saw the ensemble perform Quadrophenia at Madison Square Garden over six nights in July 1996. A recording from the tour was subsequently released in 2005 as part of Tommy and Quadrophenia Live.

=== 2010s tours ===
The Who performed Quadrophenia at the Royal Albert Hall on 30 March 2010 as part of the Teenage Cancer Trust series of ten gigs. This one-off performance of the rock opera featured guest appearances from Pearl Jam's Eddie Vedder and Kasabian's Tom Meighan.

In November 2012, the Who started a U.S. tour of Quadrophenia, dubbed "Quadrophenia and More". The group played the entire album without any guest singers or announcements with the then regular Who line-up (including Starkey and bassist Pino Palladino, who replaced Entwistle following his death in 2002) along with five additional musicians. The tour included additional video performances, including Moon singing "Bell Boy" from 1974 and Entwistle's bass solo in "5:15" from 2000. After Starkey injured his wrist, session drummer Scott Devours replaced him for part of the tour with minimal rehearsal. The tour progressed, with Devours drumming, to the UK in 2013, ending in a performance at Wembley Arena in July.

In September 2017, Townshend embarked on a short tour with Billy Idol, Alfie Boe, and an orchestra entitled "Classic Quadrophenia".

== Adaptations ==
=== Film ===
Quadrophenia was revived for a film version in 1979, directed by Franc Roddam. The film attempted to portray an accurate visual interpretation of Townshend's vision of Jimmy and his surroundings, and included Phil Daniels as Jimmy and Sting as the Ace Face. Unlike the Tommy film, the music was largely relegated to the background, and was not performed by the cast as in a rock opera. The film soundtrack included three additional songs written by Townshend, which were Kenney Jones' first recordings as an official member of the Who. The film was a commercial and critical success, as it conveniently coincided with the mod revival movement of the late 1970s.

=== Other productions ===
There have been several amateur productions of a Quadrophenia musical. In 2007, the Royal Welsh College of Music & Drama performed a musical based on the original album at the Sherman Theatre, Cardiff, featuring a cast of 12 backed by an 11-piece band.

In October 1995, the rock group Phish, with an additional four-man horn section, performed Quadrophenia in its entirety as their second Halloween musical costume at the Rosemont Horizon in the Chicago suburb of Rosemont, Illinois. The recording was later released as a part of Live Phish Volume 14. The band also covered the tracks "Drowned" and "Sea and Sand" on their live album New Year's Eve 1995 – Live at Madison Square Garden.

In June 2015, Townshend produced an orchestral version of the album entitled Classic Quadrophenia. The album was orchestrated by his partner Rachel Fuller and conducted by Robert Ziegler, with instrumentation provided by the Royal Philharmonic Orchestra. Tenor Alfie Boe sang the lead role, supported by the London Oriana Choir, Billy Idol, Phil Daniels, and Townshend.

A ballet based on the album called Quadrophenia – A Mod Ballet premiered at the Theatre Royal, Plymouth on 28 May 2025 before touring the UK (including a run at Sadler's Wells Theatre, London) which was directed by Rob Ashford and choreographed by Paul Roberts. The backdrop of the ballet was the 2015 Classic Quadrophenia album.

== Track listing ==
=== Original release ===
All tracks are written by Pete Townshend.

Side one
No.	Title	Lead vocals	Length
1.	"I Am the Sea"	Roger Daltrey	2:09
2.	"The Real Me"	Daltrey	3:21
3.	"Quadrophenia"	(instrumental)	6:14
4.	"Cut My Hair"	Townshend (verses); Daltrey (chorus)	3:45
5.	"The Punk and the Godfather"	Daltrey (verses and chorus); Townshend (bridge)	5:11
Total length:			20:40

Side two
No.	Title	Lead vocals	Length
1.	"I'm One"	Townshend	2:38
2.	"The Dirty Jobs"	Daltrey	4:30
3.	"Helpless Dancer" (Roger's theme)	Daltrey	2:34
4.	"Is It in My Head?"	Daltrey (verses and bridge); John Entwistle (chorus)	3:44
5.	"I've Had Enough"	Daltrey; Townshend	6:15
Total length:			19:41

Side three
No.	Title	Lead vocals	Length
1.	"5:15"	Daltrey; Townshend (intro and coda)	5:01
2.	"Sea and Sand"	Daltrey; Townshend	5:02
3.	"Drowned"	Daltrey	5:28
4.	"Bell Boy" (Keith's theme)	Daltrey; Keith Moon	4:56
Total length:			20:27

Side four
No.	Title	Lead vocal	Length
1.	"Doctor Jimmy" (including John's theme, "Is It Me")	Daltrey	8:37
2.	"The Rock"	(instrumental)	6:38
3.	"Love, Reign o'er Me" (Pete's theme)	Daltrey	5:49
Total length:			21:04 81:42

Notes:

- "The Punk and the Godfather" is retitled to "The Punk Meets the Godfather" on American pressings of the album.
- "Helpless Dancer" includes the intro to "The Kids Are Alright" from My Generation (1965).

== 2011 Super Deluxe Edition track listing ==
Quadrophenia was reissued as a super deluxe edition on 14 November 2011.

For its super deluxe reissue, Quadrophenia was reissued with:

- Original 1973 album 2-CD; 2011 remaster of the original 1973 album
- Demos from Pete Townshend's archive 2-CD; Demos that were dubbed as "The Director's Cut" bonus tracks (It was originally reported that "Ambition" was set to be a part of these demos, where it was placed between "Joker James" and "Punk", but it was ultimately not included in the set.)
- Replica single 1–45; a reproduction of the "5:15"/"Water" single with the original picture sleeve
- Quadrophenia EP 1-DVD; a selection of 8 songs from the original album remixed into 5.1 Surround Sound
- 100 page hardback book includes rare photos, memorabilia from the period (which were housed in a separate card envelope), replica of the original Track Records promotional poster, and new liner notes by Pete Townshend, including a 13,000 word essay, revealing studio diaries, and track by track guide to the demos

This super deluxe edition was released as the Director's Cut.

All songs are written by Pete Townshend.

Discs one and two: Original album

=== Demos from Pete Townshend's archive ===
CD three: The Demos
No.	Title	Recording date	Length
1.	"The Real Me"	written and recorded in October 1972	4:24
2.	"Quadrophenia – Four Overtures"	in 1973	6:20
3.	"Cut My Hair"	written in June 1972	3:28
4.	"Fill No. 1 – Get Out and Stay Out"	12 November 1972	1:22
5.	"Quadrophenic – Four Faces"	in July 1972	4:02
6.	"We Close Tonight"	in July 1972	2:41
7.	"You Came Back"	in July 1972	3:16
8.	"Get Inside"	written in April 1972	3:09
9.	"Joker James"	in July 1972	3:41
10.	"Punk"	18 November 1972	4:56
11.	"I'm One"	15 November 1972	2:37
12.	"Dirty Jobs"	25 July 1972	3:45
13.	"Helpless Dancer"	in 1973	2:16
Total length:			43:38

CD four: The Demos
No.	Title	Recording date	Length
1.	"Is It in My Head?"	30 April 1972	4:12
2.	"Anymore"	listed as recorded on 10 November 1971, but probably a misprint; actual year would have been 1972	3:19
3.	"I've Had Enough"	written and recorded on 17 December 1972	6:21
4.	"Fill No. 2"	12 November 1972	1:30
5.	"Wizardry"	in August 1972	3:10
6.	"Sea and Sand"	written and recorded on 1 November 1972	4:13
7.	"Drowned"	in March 1970	4:14
8.	"Is It Me?"	20 March 1973	4:37
9.	"Bell Boy"	3 March 1973	5:03
10.	"Doctor Jimmy"	27 July 1972	7:28
11.	"Finale – The Rock"	between 25 March and 1 May 1973	7:57
12.	"Love Reign O'er Me"	10 May 1972	5:10
Total length:			57:14

=== Quadrophenia EP in 5.1 ===
DVD: Quadrophenia in Surround Sound
No.	Title	Length
1.	"I Am the Sea"
2.	"The Real Me"
3.	"Quadrophenia"
4.	"I've Had Enough"
5.	"5:15"
6.	"Doctor Jimmy"
7.	"The Rock"
8.	"Love Reign O'er Me"

=== Bonus single ===
Side one
No.	Title	Length
1.	"5:15" (Single Edit)	4:48

Side two
No.	Title	Length
1.	"Water"	4:39

== Personnel ==
Taken from the sleeve notes:

The Who

- John Entwistle – bass guitar, horns, backing vocals, co-lead vocals on 'Is It in My Head?'
- Roger Daltrey – lead vocals (all except 'Quadrophenia' (instrumental), 'I'm One' (Townshend) and 'The Rock' (instrumental)), co-lead vocals on 'Cut My Hair'
- Keith Moon – drums, percussion, co-lead vocals on 'Bell Boy'
- Pete Townshend – guitars, keyboards, banjo on 'I've Had Enough', cello on "I Am the Sea" and "Cut My Hair", backing vocals, lead vocals on 'Cut My Hair' and 'I'm One', co-lead vocals on 'The Punk and the Godfather', 'I've Had Enough' '5:15', and 'Sea and Sand'

Additional musicians

- John Curle – newsreader voice on "Cut My Hair"
- Chris Stainton – piano on "The Dirty Jobs", "5:15", and "Drowned"

Production

- The Who – production
- Kit Lambert – pre-production, executive production
- Pete Townshend – pre-production, sound effects
- Chris Stamp – executive production
- Pete Kameron – executive production
- Ron Nevison – engineering, special effects
- Ron Fawcus – mixing continuity, engineering assistance
- Bob Pridden – studio earphone
- Rod Houison – special effects
- Graham Hughes – front cover design and photography
- Ethan Russell – art direction, insert photography
- Jon Astley – remixing (1996 reissue)
- Bob Ludwig – remastering (1996 reissue)
- Richard Evans – design and art direction (1996 reissue and 2011 super deluxe edition)

== Charts ==
=== Weekly charts ===
1973–1974 weekly chart performance for Quadrophenia
Chart (1973–1974)	Peak position
Australian Albums (Kent Music Report)	7
Austrian Albums (Ö3 Austria)	8
Canada Top Albums/CDs (RPM)	2
German Albums (Offizielle Top 100)	7
Italian Albums (Musica e Dischi)	12
UK Albums (Official Charts)	2
US Billboard 200	2

2011 weekly chart performance for Quadrophenia
Chart (2011)	Peak position
Dutch Albums (Album Top 100)	87

2014 weekly chart performance for Quadrophenia
Chart (2014)	Peak position
Italian Albums (FIMI)	60

2025 weekly chart performance for Quadrophenia
Chart (2025)	Peak position
Greek Albums (IFPI)	14

=== Year-end charts ===
1974 year-end chart performance for Quadrophenia
Chart (1974)	Position
German Albums (Offizielle Top 100)	25

== Certifications ==
Certifications for Quadrophenia
Region	Certification	Certified units/sales
Canada (Music Canada)	Platinum	100,000^{^}
France (SNEP)	Gold	100,000^{*}
United Kingdom (BPI)	Gold	100,000^{^}
United States (RIAA)	Platinum	1,000,000^{^}
^{*} Sales figures based on certification alone.^{^} Shipments figures based on certification alone.
