= The Who discography =

Cataloguing of published recordings by the Who

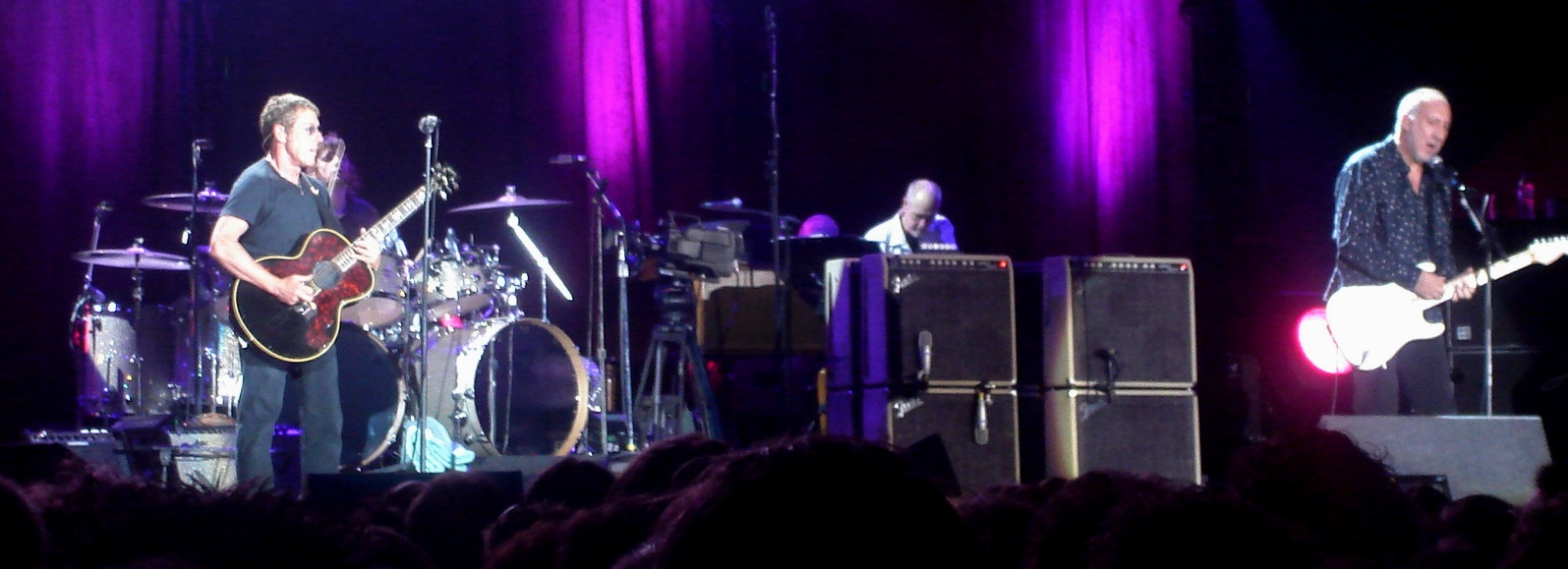
- Studio albums: 12
- Extended plays: 4
- Soundtrack albums: 4
- Live albums: 18
- Compilation albums: 36
- Singles: 58
- Video albums: 25
- Music videos: 12

The discography of the English rock band the Who consists of 12 studio albums, 18 live albums, four soundtrack albums, 36 compilation albums, four extended plays, 58 singles and 25 video albums.

The Who have been with several labels over the years. In the United Kingdom and elsewhere outside North America, they were signed originally to Brunswick Records. In 1966, they moved to Polydor Records and took the rights to their Brunswick recordings with them. They created and moved to Track Records the following year with distribution by Polydor. They left Track in 1974 and returned to Polydor directly, remaining with the label ever since.

In North America, they were originally on Decca Records. They moved to Atco Records for one single in 1966 before returning to Decca later that year. In 1972 the US Decca label was absorbed into MCA Records. The band changed North American labels again in 1981, to Warner Bros. Records. The label released Face Dances and It's Hard and their singles, before the Who disbanded. In later years, MCA would acquire the US rights to the Warner Bros. albums. In 2003, MCA Records (now under common ownership with Polydor, under Universal Music Group) was folded into Geffen Records. Geffen now controls the US rights to the Who's catalogue up through It's Hard. Their 2006 comeback album, Endless Wire, was released through Universal Republic in the US.

== Albums ==
=== Studio albums ===
Title	Album details	Peak chart positions										Certifications (sales thresholds)
Title	Album details	UK	AUS	CAN	FRA	GER	NLD	NOR	SWE	SWI	US	Certifications (sales thresholds)
My Generation (UK) The Who Sings My Generation (US)	Released: 3 December 1965 (UK); 25 April 1966 (US); Label: Brunswick (UK) and Decca (US)	5	153	—	—	14	—	—	—	—	—	UK: Gold
A Quick One (UK) Happy Jack (US)	Released: 9 December 1966 (UK); April 1967 (US); Label: Reaction (UK) and Decca (US)	4	163	13	—	—	—	19	—	—	67	
The Who Sell Out	Released: 15 December 1967; Label: Track (UK) and Decca (US)	13	8	160	3	—	—	—	—	48	48	UK: Silver
Tommy	Released: 19 May 1969; Label: Track (UK) and Decca (US)	2	8	6	2	50	5	—	—	—	4	UK: Gold; FRA: Gold; NZ: Gold; US: 2× Platinum
Who's Next	Released: 2 August 1971 (US); 27 August 1971 (UK); Label: Track (UK) and Decca (US)	1	3	5	2	14	2	6	—	39	4	UK: Platinum; US: 3× Platinum
Quadrophenia	Released: 26 October 1973 (US); 2 November 1973 (UK); Label: Track (UK) and MCA (US)	2	7	2	—	—	3	3	—	—	2	UK: Gold; FRA: Gold; US: Platinum
The Who by Numbers	Released: 3 October 1975; Label: Polydor (UK) and MCA (US)	7	29	9	3	8	—	—	—	40	8	UK: Gold; CAN: Gold; US: Platinum
Who Are You	Released: 21 August 1978; Label: Polydor (UK) and MCA (US)	6	9	2	7	49	29	21	27	—	2	UK: Gold; CAN: 2× Platinum; US: 2× Platinum
Face Dances	Released: 16 March 1981; Label: Polydor (UK) and Warner Bros. (US)	2	9	1	12	29	16	19	17	—	4	UK: Silver; US: Platinum
It's Hard	Released: September 1982; Label: Polydor (UK) and Warner Bros. (US)	11	55	3	—	—	43	28	47	—	8	CAN: Gold; US: Gold
Endless Wire	Released: 30 October 2006; Label: Polydor (UK) and Republic (US)	9	63	10	62	34	77	23	—	51	7	UK: Gold
Who	Released: 6 December 2019; Label: Polydor (UK and US)	3	64	2	43	5	38	—	27	5	2	UK: Gold

=== Live albums ===
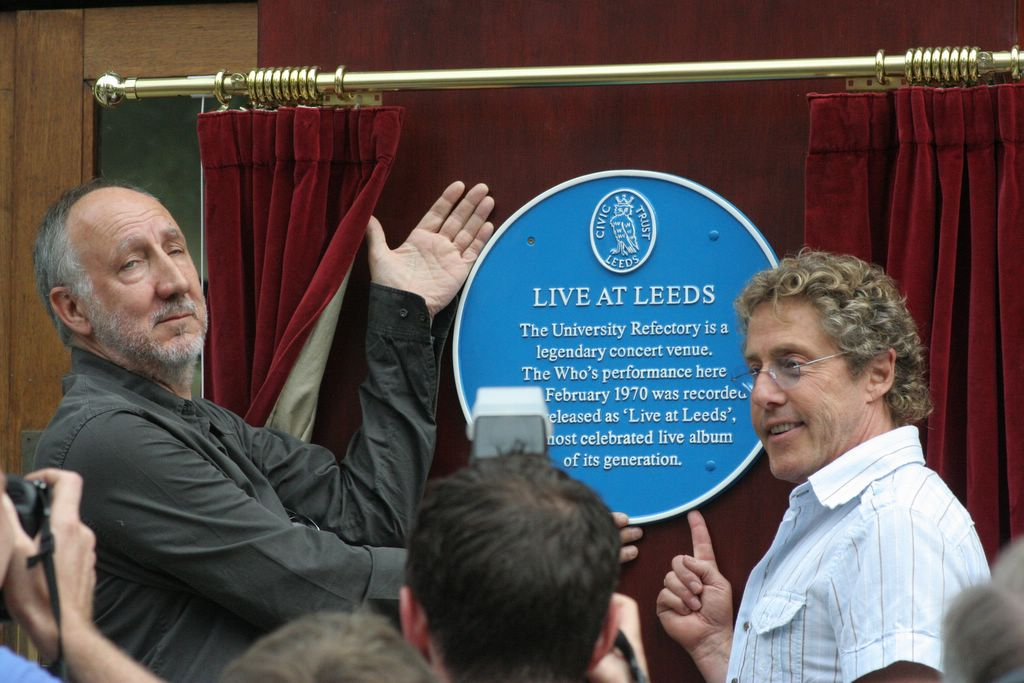
Townshend and Daltrey at Leeds University Refectory in June 2006 unveiling a Leeds Civic Trust Blue Plaque commemorating the recording venue of The Who's Live at Leeds gig in February 1970.

Title	Album details	Peak chart positions									Certifications
Title	Album details	UK	AUS	CAN	GER	NLD	NOR	US	US Cash Box	Record World	Certifications
Live at Leeds	Released: 16 May 1970; Label: Track (UK) and Decca (US)	3	6	2	8	5	13	4	4	3	UK: Gold; US: 2× Platinum
Who's Last	Released: December 1984; Label: MCA (UK and US)	48	—	56	—	—	—	81	—	—	UK: Gold
Join Together	Released: March 1990; Label: Virgin (UK) and MCA (US)	59	119	—	—	—	—	188	—	—	
Live at the Isle of Wight Festival 1970	Released: 29 October 1996; Label: Sony (UK) and Columbia/Legacy (US)	84	—	—	—	—	—	194	—	—	
BBC Sessions	Released: 15 February 2000; Label: Polydor (UK) and MCA (US)	24	—	—	—	—	—	101	—	—	
Blues to the Bush	Released: 19 March 2000; Label: Polydor (UK) and MCA (US)	—	—	—	—	—	—	—	—	—	
Live at the Royal Albert Hall	Released: 5 December 2003; Label: Polydor (UK) and MCA (US)	72	—	—	43	95	—	—	—	—	
Live from Toronto	Released: 21 April 2006; Label: Immortal (Europe only)	—	—	—	—	—	—	—	—	—	
View from a Backstage Pass	Released: 5 November 2007; Label: thewho.com	—	—	—	—	—	—	—	—	—	
Greatest Hits Live	Released: 18 January 2010; Label: Polydor (UK) and Geffen (US)	—	—	—	—	—	—	—	—	—	
Live at Hull 1970	Released: 19 November 2012; Label: Polydor (UK) & Geffen (US)	68	—	—	—	—	—	—	—	—	
Quadrophenia Live in London	Released: 10 June 2014; Label: Universal (UK and US)	28	—	—	—	—	—	118	—	—	
Live in Hyde Park	Released: 6 November 2015; Label: Eagle (UK and US)	—	—	—	—	—	—	—	—	—	
Live at the Isle of Wight Festival 2004	Released: 6 February 2017; Label: Eagle (UK and US)	—	—	—	—	—	—	—	—	—	
Tommy Live at the Royal Albert Hall	Released: 13 October 2017; Label: Eagle (UK and US)	—	—	—	—	—	—	—	—	—	
Live at the Fillmore East 1968	Released: 20 April 2018; Label: Polydor (UK) and Geffen (US)	15	—	—	26	—	—	—	—	—	
The Who With Orchestra Live at Wembley	Released: 31 March 2023; Label: Polydor (UK and US)	—	—	—	12	—	—	—	—	—	
Live at Shea Stadium 1982	Released: 1 March 2024; Label: Mercury Records (UK and US)	—	—	—	—	—	—	—	—	—	
Live at the Oval 1971	Released: 22 August 2025; Label: UMe	40	—	—	28	—	—	147	—	—	
Live at Eden Project	Released: 29 May 2026; Label: earMUSIC	—	—	—	—	—	—	—	—	—	
"—" denotes albums that were released but did not chart, albums not released in a particular territory, or chart information is not available.

=== Soundtrack albums ===
Title	Album details	Peak chart positions		Certifications
Title	Album details	UK	US	Certifications
Tommy	Released: 19 March 1975; Label: Polydor (UK) and MCA (US)	21	2	UK: Gold; CAN: Gold; US: Gold
The Kids Are Alright	Released: 8 June 1979; Label: Polydor (UK) and MCA (US)	26	8	UK: Gold; CAN: Gold; US: Platinum
Quadrophenia	Released: September 1979; Label: Polydor (UK) and MCA (US)	23	46	UK: Gold
Amazing Journey: The Story of The Who	Released: 24 March 2008; Label: Geffen (US only)	—	—	
"—" denotes albums that did not chart, or was not released in that country.

=== Compilation albums ===
Title	Album details	Peak chart positions										Certifications
Title	Album details	UK	AUS	BEL	CAN	ESP	IRE	NOR	US	US Cash Box	Record World	Certifications
Magic Bus: The Who on Tour	Released: September 1968; Label: Decca (US only)	—	—	—	—	—	—	—	39	—	31	
Direct Hits	Released: October 1968; Label: Track (UK only)	—	—	—	—	—	—	—	—	—	—	
Backtrack 8: A Quick One (Part of Track Records' Backtrack series, reissue of A Quick One)	Released: November 1970; Label: Track (UK only)	—	—	—	—	—	—	—	—	—	—	
Backtrack 9: The Who Sell Out (Part of Track Records' Backtrack series, reissue of The Who Sell Out)	Released: November 1970; Label: Track (UK only)	—	—	—	—	—	—	—	—	—	—	
Backtrack 14: The Ox (Part of Track Records' Backtrack series, Who tracks written or co-written by John Entwistle)	Released: November 1970; Label: Track (UK only)	—	—	—	—	—	—	—	—	—	—	
Meaty Beaty Big and Bouncy	Released: November 1971; Label: Track (UK) and Decca (US)	9	27	—	—	—	—	—	11	14	9	US: Platinum
Tommy Part 1 (Reissue of Tommy LP1)	Released: 12 May 1972; Label: Track (UK only)	—	—	—	—	—	—	—	—	—	—	
Tommy Part 2 (Reissue of Tommy LP2)	Released: 16 June 1972; Label: Track (UK only)	—	—	—	—	—	—	—	—	—	—	
A Quick One/The Who Sell Out (2×LP reissue)	Released: 1974; Label: Track (UK) and MCA (US)	—	—	—	—	—	—	—	—	—	—	
Odds & Sods	Released: 4 October 1974; Label: Track (UK) and MCA (US)	10	47	—	—	—	—	—	15	—	14	UK: Silver; US: Gold
Magic Bus: The Who On Tour/The Who Sings My Generation (2×LP reissue)	Released: 1974; Label: MCA (US only)	—	—	—	—	—	—	—	185	—	—	
The Story of The Who	Released: 24 September 1976; Label: Polydor (UK only)	2	—	—	—	—	—	—	—	—	—	UK: Gold
Phases	Released: May 1981; Label: Polydor (UK only)	—	—	—	—	—	—	—	—	—	—	
Hooligans	Released: October 1981; Label: MCA (US only)	—	—	—	—	—	—	—	52	—	73	US: Gold
Who's Greatest Hits	Released: May 1983; Label: MCA (US only)	—	—	—	—	—	—	—	94	—	—	US: 2× Platinum
Rarities Volume I & Volume II	Released: August 1983; Label: Polydor (UK only)	—	—	—	—	—	—	—	—	—	—	
The Singles	Released: October 1984; Label: Polydor (UK only)	—	—	—	—	—	—	—	—	—	—	
The Who Collection	Released: 30 September 1985; Label: Polydor (UK only)	44	—	—	—	—	—	—	—	—	—	UK: Gold
Who's Missing	Released: November 1985; Label: MCA (UK and US)	44	—	—	—	—	—	—	116	—	—	
Two's Missing	Released: April 1987; Label: MCA (UK and US)	—	—	—	—	—	—	—	—	—	—	
Who's Better, Who's Best	Released: March 1988; Label: Polydor (UK) and MCA (US)	10	51	45	—	—	—	—	—	—	—	UK: Gold; US: Gold
Thirty Years of Maximum R&B	Released: 5 July 1994; Label: Polydor (UK) and MCA (US)	48	138	—	—	—	—	—	170	—	—	US: Gold
My Generation: The Very Best of The Who	Released: 27 August 1996; Label: Polydor (UK) and MCA (US)	11	—	—	—	—	—	—	—	—	—	UK: Gold; US: Gold
20th Century Masters – The Millennium Collection: The Best of The Who	Released: 13 April 1999; Label: Universal (US only)	—	—	—	—	—	—	—	—	—	—	US: Platinum
The Ultimate Collection	Released: 11 June 2002; Label: Polydor (UK) and MCA (US)	17	150	—	—	—	65	11	31	—	—	UK: Platinum; US: Platinum
Then and Now 1964—2004	Released: 30 March 2004; Label: Polydor (UK) and Geffen (US)	5	96	—	—	67	21	—	57	—	—	UK: 2× Platinum; NZ: Gold
The 1st Singles Box	Released: 2 May 2004; Label: Polydor (Europe only)	154	—	—	—	1	—	—	—	—	—	
Then and Now 1964—2007	Released: 11 June 2007; Label: Polydor (UK only)	9	—	—	—	—	—	—	—	—	—	
Greatest Hits	Released: 21 December 2009; Label: Polydor (UK) and Geffen (US)	12	170	69	—	—	—	—	19	—	—	
Greatest Hits & More	Released: 13 February 2010; Label: Polydor (UK only)	20	—	—	—	—	—	—	—	—	—	UK: Gold
Icon	Released: 5 April 2011; Label: Geffen (US only)	—	—	—	—	—	—	—	—	—	—	
Icon 2	Released: 5 April 2011; Label: Geffen (US only)	—	—	—	—	—	—	—	—	—	—	
Pinball Wizard: The Collection	Released: 28 May 2012; Label: Spectrum (UK only)	—	—	—	—	—	—	—	—	—	—	UK: Gold
The Who Hits 50!	Released: 27 October 2014; Label: Polydor (UK) and Geffen (US)	11	—	—	44	—	—	—	—	—	—	UK: Platinum
Maximum A's & B's: The Complete Singles	Released: 27 October 2017; Label: Polydor (UK only)	—	—	—	—	—	—	—	—	—	—	
Essential	Released: 16 October 2020; Label: Universal (UK only)	—	—	—	—	—	—	—	—	—	—	
"—" denotes albums that were released but did not chart, albums not released in a particular territory, or chart information is not available.

== Extended plays ==
Title	EP details	Peak chart positions					
Title	EP details	UK	AUT	DEN	ESP	NZ	SWI
Ready Steady Who	Released: 11 November 1966; Label: Reaction (UK only)	1	—	—	—	—	—
Tommy	Released: 6 November 1970; Label: Track (UK only)	53 (Note: Chart position is from the official UK "Breakers List".)	—	—	—	—	—
Won't Get Fooled Again	Released: August 1988; Label: Polydor Records (UK only)	91	—	—	—	—	—
Wire & Glass	Released: 17 July 2006; Label: Polydor (Europe and Australasia)	—	31	3	9	39	83

== Singles ==
Year	Song	B-side	Chart positions											Certifications	Album
Year	Song	B-side	UK	AUS	CAN	FRA	GER	NLD	NZ	SWI	US Hot 100	US Cash Box	US Main	Certifications	Album
1964	"Zoot Suit" (credited to The High Numbers)	"I'm the Face" (credited to The High Numbers)	—	—	—	—	—	—	—	—	—	—	—		Non-album singles
1964	"I Can't Explain"	"Bald Headed Woman"	8	87	—	14	—	—	—	—	93	57	—		Non-album singles
1965	"Anyway, Anyhow, Anywhere"	"Daddy Rolling Stone" (UK) "Anytime You Want Me" (US)	10	—	—	38	—	—	—	—	—	—	—		Non-album singles
1965	"My Generation"	"Shout and Shimmy" (UK) (non-album track) "Out in the Street" (US)	2	2	3	13	6	7	—	—	74	99	—	UK: Platinum	My Generation
1966	"Substitute"	"Circles" or "Waltz for a Pig" or "Instant Party" (UK) "Waltz for a Pig" (US)	5	5	—	24	13	2	3	—	—	—	—		Non-album single
1966	"A Legal Matter"	"Instant Party" (non-album track)	32	83	—	—	—	20	—	—	—	—	—		My Generation
1966	"The Kids Are Alright"	"The Ox" (UK) "A Legal Matter" (US)	41	—	—	—	—	—	—	—	106	85	—		My Generation
1966	"I'm a Boy"	"In the City"	2	11	23	14	10	6	2	—	—	—	—		Non-album single
1966	"La-La-La-Lies"	"The Good's Gone"	—	—	—	—	—	—	—	—	—	—	—		My Generation
1966	"Happy Jack"	"I've Been Away" (UK) "Whiskey Man" (US)	3	4	1	21	4	5	6	—	24	13	—		Happy Jack (US)
1967	"Pictures of Lily"	"Doctor, Doctor"	4	7	36	27	5	5	14	—	51	60	—		Non-album singles
1967	"The Last Time"	"Under My Thumb"	44	—	—	—	—	—	—	—	—	—	—		Non-album singles
1967	"I Can See for Miles"	"Someone's Coming" (non-album track) (UK) "Mary Anne with the Shaky Hand" (US)	10	20	4	74	37	28	13	—	9	8	—		The Who Sell Out
1968	"Call Me Lightning"	"Dr. Jekyll and Mr Hyde"	—	30	35	—	—	38	—	—	40	38	—		Hooligans (Compilation album from 1981)
1968	"Dogs"	"Call Me Lightning"	25	93	—	78	40	—	—	—	—	—	—		Hooligans (Compilation album from 1981)
1968	"Magic Bus"	"Someone's Coming" (US) "Dr. Jekyll and Mr. Hyde" (UK)	26	20	6	—	20	—	13	—	25	10	—		Magic Bus: The Who on Tour
1969	"Pinball Wizard"	"Dogs, Pt. 2" (non-album track)	4	45	6	89	25	12	8	15	19	15	—	UK: Gold	Tommy
1969	"I'm Free"	"We're Not Gonna Take It"	—	83	26	71	18	20	—	—	37	30	—		Tommy
1970	"The Seeker"	"Here for More"	19	—	21	34	18	15	—	—	44	30	—		Non-album single
1970	"Summertime Blues"	"Heaven and Hell" (non-album studio recording)	38	—	8	58	19	25	—	—	27	14	—		Live at Leeds
1970	"Young Man Blues"	"Substitute"	—	—	38	—	—	—	—	—	—	—	—		Live at Leeds
1970	"See Me, Feel Me"	"Overture"	—	70	4	—	—	16	—	—	12	8	—		Tommy
1971	"Won't Get Fooled Again"	"I Don't Even Know Myself" (non-album track)	9	14	7	—	27	8	—	—	15	9	—	UK: Gold	Who's Next
1971	"Let's See Action"	"When I Was a Boy"	16	59	—	33	43	25	—	—	—	—	—		Non-album single
1971	"Behind Blue Eyes"	"My Wife"	—	—	23	—	—	—	—	—	34	24	—	UK: Silver	Who's Next
1972	"Baba O'Riley"	"My Wife"	—	80	—	—	—	11	—	—	—	—	—	UK: Platinum	Who's Next
1972	"Join Together"	"Baby Don't You Do It" (live)	9	58	18	49	23	27	—	9	17	28	—		Non-album singles
1972	"Relay"	"Waspman"	21	—	50	28	28	29	—	—	39	33	—		Non-album singles
1973	"5:15"	"Water" (non-album track)	20	—	—	—	46	—	—	—	—	—	—		Quadrophenia
1973	"Love, Reign o'er Me"	"Water" (non-album track)	—	—	31	—	—	—	—	—	76	54	—		Quadrophenia
1974	"The Real Me"	"I'm One"	—	—	—	—	—	—	—	—	92	82	—		Quadrophenia
1974	"Postcard"	"Put the Money Down"	—	—	—	—	—	—	—	—	—	64	—		Odds & Sods
1974	"Long Live Rock"	"Pure and Easy"	—	—	—	—	—	—	—	—	—	—	—		Odds & Sods
1975	"Squeeze Box"	"Success Story"	10	45	1	68	—	—	26	—	16	11	—		The Who by Numbers
1976	"Slip Kid"	"Dreaming from the Waist"	—	—	—	72	—	—	—	—	—	—	—		The Who by Numbers
1976	"Substitute"	"I'm a Boy"/"Pictures of Lily" (first UK 12" single release)	7	—	—	—	—	—	—	—	—	—	—		The Story of The Who
1978	"Who Are You"	"Had Enough"	18	23	7	—	—	44	23	—	14	9	—	UK: Silver	Who Are You
1978	"Trick of the Light"	"905"	—	—	—	—	—	—	—	—	—	—	—		Who Are You
1979	"Long Live Rock"	"I'm the Face"/"My Wife" (UK) "My Wife" (US)	48	—	—	47	—	—	—	—	54	66	—		The Kids Are Alright
1979	"5:15"	"I'm One"	—	—	—	—	—	—	—	—	45	53	—		Quadrophenia
1981	"You Better You Bet"	"The Quiet One"	9	21	4	61	—	12	38	—	18	15	1		Face Dances
1981	"Don't Let Go the Coat"	"You"	47	—	—	—	—	—	—	—	84	77	—		Face Dances
1982	"Athena"	"A Man Is a Man" (UK) "It's Your Turn" (US)	40	—	5	—	—	—	—	—	28	31	3		It's Hard
1982	"Eminence Front"	"One at a Time"	—	—	—	—	—	—	—	—	68	—	5		It's Hard
1983	"It's Hard"	"Dangerous"	—	—	—	—	—	—	—	—	—	—	39		It's Hard
1984	"Twist and Shout" (live)	"I Can't Explain"	87	—	—	—	—	—	—	—	—	—	—		Who's Last
1988	"My Generation"	"Substitute"/"Baba O'Riley"	68	88	—	—	—	—	—	—	—	—	—		Who's Better, Who's Best
1988	"Won't Get Fooled Again"	"Substitute"/"Baba O'Riley"	91	—	—	—	—	—	—	—	—	—	—	UK: Gold	Who's Better, Who's Best
1988	"Join Together" (live)	"I Can See for Miles" (live)/"Behind Blue Eyes" (live)	100	—	—	—	—	—	—	—	—	—	—		Join Together
1996	"My Generation"	"Pinball Wizard" (live)/"Boris the Spider"/"My Generation" (Deep Love Remix)	31	—	—	—	—	—	—	—	—	—	—		Non-album single
2004	"Real Good Looking Boy"	"Old Red Wine"	—	—	—	—	—	—	—	—	—	—	—		Then and Now
2006	"Wire & Glass"	"Mirror Door"	—	51	9	—	58	—	39	83	—	—	—		Endless Wire
2006	"It's Not Enough"	"Tea & Theatre"	—	—	—	—	—	—	—	—	—	—	37		Endless Wire
2012	"Baba O'Riley"/"See Me, Feel Me"/"My Generation" (live)	"Early Morning Cold Taxi" (from 30 Years of Maximum R&B)	55	—	—	—	—	—	—	—	—	—	—		A Symphony of British Music
2014	"Be Lucky"	—	—	—	—	—	—	—	—	—	—	—	—		The Who Hits 50!
2019	"Ball and Chain"	—	—	—	—	—	—	—	—	—	—	—	—		Who
2019	"All This Music Must Fade"	—	—	—	—	—	—	—	—	—	—	—	—		Who
2019	"I Don't Wanna Get Wise"	—	—	—	—	—	—	—	—	—	—	—	—		Who
"—" denotes albums that did not chart.

== Other charted songs ==
List of charted songs, with selected chart positions
Title	Year	Peak chart positions			Album
Title	Year	US Main	SWE	DEN	Album
"Bucket 'T'"	1967	—	1	9	Ready Steady Who
"Another Tricky Day"	1981	6	—	—	Face Dances
"Daily Records"	1981	36	—	—	Face Dances
"Did You Steal My Money?"	1981	38	—	—	Face Dances
"How Can You Do It Alone?"	1981	50	—	—	Face Dances
"You"	1981	51	—	—	Face Dances
"Cry If You Want"	1982	34	—	—	It's Hard
"Dangerous"	1982	38	—	—	It's Hard

== Other appearances ==
=== Studio contributions ===
Year	Song	Album
1979	"Get Out and Stay Out", "Four Faces", and "Joker James"	Quadrophenia (soundtrack)
1991	"Saturday Night's Alright for Fighting"	Two Rooms: Celebrating the Songs of Elton John & Bernie Taupin

=== Live appearances ===
Year	Songs	Album
1981	"Baba O'Riley", "Sister Disco", "Behind Blue Eyes", and "See Me, Feel Me"	Concerts for the People of Kampuchea
2001	"Who Are You", "Baba O'Riley", and "Won't Get Fooled Again"	The Concert for New York City

== Guest appearances ==
- The Who performed the songs "Fire" and "Dig" from Pete Townshend's sixth solo studio album The Iron Man: The Musical by Pete Townshend, which was released in 1989.

== Videography ==
=== Film adaptations ===
- Tommy (1975)
- Quadrophenia (1979)

=== Documentaries ===
- The Kids Are Alright (1979) – UK: Platinum
- Classic Albums: The Who – Who's Next (2000)
- Amazing Journey: The Story of The Who (2008)
- Sensation: The Story of Tommy (2013)
- Lambert & Stamp (2014)

=== Concerts ===
- Who Rocks America (1983)
- Who's Better, Who's Best (1988) – AUS: 2× Platinum, CAN: Platinum, US: Gold
- The Who Featuring Tommy (1989) – UK: Gold, US: Platinum
- Thirty Years of Maximum R&B Live (1994) – UK: Gold
- Who's Tommy: The Amazing Journey (1994) – UK: Gold
- Live at the Isle of Wight Festival 1970 (1998) – UK: Platinum, AUS: Gold, CAN: Platinum, US: Platinum
- The Who & Special Guests: Live at the Royal Albert Hall (2001) – UK: Platinum, AUS: Platinum, US: Platinum
- Live in Boston (2003)
- Tommy and Quadrophenia Live (2005) – UK: Gold, *AUS: Gold, *US: 3× Platinum
- The Vegas Job (2006) – UK: Gold, CAN: Platinum
- Live from Toronto (2006)
- The Who at Kilburn: 1977 (2008)
- The Who Live In Texas '75 (2012)
- Quadrophenia Live in London (2014)
- The Who Live at Shea Stadium 1982 (2015)
- The Who Live in Hyde Park (2015)
- Live at the Isle of Wight Festival 2004 (2017)
- Tommy Live at the Royal Albert Hall (2017)

=== Other appearances ===
- Monterey Pop (1968)
- Woodstock (1969)
- Concert for Kampuchea (1980)
- The Rolling Stones Rock and Roll Circus (1996)
- The Concert for New York City (2001)
- The Concert for Sandy Relief (2012)

=== Music videos ===
Year	Title	Album
1964	"I Can't Explain"	non-album
1966	"Substitute"	non-album
1966	"The Kids Are Alright"	My Generation
1966	"Happy Jack"	Happy Jack (US)
1968	"Call Me Lightning"	non-album
1970	"The Seeker"	non-album
1972	"Join Together"	non-album
1978	"Who Are You"	Who Are You
1981	"You Better You Bet"	Face Dances
1981	"Don't Let Go the Coat"	Face Dances
1981	"Another Tricky Day"	Face Dances
1982	"Eminence Front"	It's Hard

== See also ==
- List of songs recorded by the Who
- Pete Townshend discography
- John Entwistle discography
- Roger Daltrey discography
- Keith Moon discography
