= List of songs recorded by the Who =

Songs recorded by The Who

The following table lists songs and instrumentals recorded by the rock band the Who since its formation in 1964. For details of releases (singles, albums, etc) see the Who discography.

== Songs ==
Name of song, featured performers, writer(s), original release, and year of release
Song	Writer(s)	Lead vocal(s)	Original release	Year	Ref.
"1921"	Pete Townshend	Townshend	Tommy	1969	
"5:15"	Townshend	Roger Daltrey; Townshend	Quadrophenia	1973	
"905"	John Entwistle	Entwistle	Who Are You	1978	
"A Legal Matter"	Townshend	Townshend	My Generation	1965	
"A Little Is Enough" (cover, live)	Townshend	Townshend	Join Together	1990	
"A Man in a Purple Dress"	Townshend	Daltrey	Endless Wire	2006	
"A Man Is a Man"	Townshend	Daltrey	It's Hard	1982	
"A Quick One, While He's Away"	Townshend	Daltrey; Entwistle; Townshend	A Quick One	1966	
"The Acid Queen"	Townshend	Townshend	Tommy	1969	
"After the Fire" (cover, live)	Townshend	Daltrey	The Blues to the Bush	2000	
"All This Music Must Fade"	Townshend	Daltrey; Townshend	Who	2019	
"Amazing Journey"	Townshend	Daltrey	Tommy	1969	
"Another Tricky Day"	Townshend	Daltrey	Face Dances	1981	
"Anytime You Want Me" (cover)	Garnet Mimms; Jerry Ragovoy	Daltrey	Non-album single (B-side to "Anyway, Anyhow, Anywhere" in the US)	1965	
"Anyway, Anyhow, Anywhere"	Daltrey; Townshend	Daltrey	Non-album single	1965	
"Armenia City in the Sky"	Speedy Keen	Daltrey; Keen	The Who Sell Out	1967	
"Athena"	Townshend	Daltrey; Townshend	It's Hard	1982	
"Baba O'Riley"	Townshend	Daltrey; Townshend	Who's Next	1971	
"Baby Don't You Do It" (cover, live)	Holland-Dozier-Holland	Daltrey	Non-album single (B-side to "Join Together")	1972	
"Bald Headed Woman" (cover)	Shel Talmy	Daltrey	Non-album single (B-side to "I Can't Explain")	1964	
"Ball and Chain"	Townshend	Daltrey	Who	2019	
"Barbara Ann" (cover)	Fred Fassert	Keith Moon	Ready Steady Who	1966	
"Bargain"	Townshend	Daltrey; Townshend	Who's Next	1971	
"Batman Theme" (cover)	Neal Hefti	Daltrey; Entwistle; Moon; Townshend	Ready Steady Who	1966	
"Be Lucky"	Townshend	Daltrey	The Who Hits 50!	2014	
"Beads On One String"	Townshend; Josh Hunsacker	Daltrey	Who	2019	
"Behind Blue Eyes"	Townshend	Daltrey	Who's Next	1971	
"Bell Boy"	Townshend	Daltrey; Moon	Quadrophenia	1973	
"Bernie's Holiday Camp"	Townshend	Ann-Margret; Alison Dowling; Oliver Reed	Tommy (soundtrack)	1975	
"Black Widow's Eyes"	Townshend	Daltrey	Endless Wire	2006	
"Blue, Red and Grey"	Townshend	Townshend	The Who by Numbers	1975	
"Bony Moronie" (cover, live)	Larry Williams	Daltrey	Won't Get Fooled Again	1988	
"Boris the Spider"	Entwistle	Entwistle	A Quick One	1966	
"Break the News"	Simon Townshend	Daltrey	Who	2019	
"Bucket T" (cover)	Dean Torrence; Roger Christian; Donald J. Altfeld	Moon	Ready Steady Who	1966	
"Cache Cache"	Townshend	Daltrey	Face Dances	1981	
"Call Me Lightning"	Townshend	Daltrey	Non-album single	1968	
"Champagne"	Townshend	Ann-Margret	Tommy (soundtrack)	1975	
"Christmas"	Townshend	Daltrey; Townshend	Tommy	1969	
"Circles"	Townshend	Daltrey	Ready Steady Who	1966	
"C'mon Everybody" (cover, live)	Eddie Cochran; Jerry Capehart	Daltrey	Live at the Fillmore East 1968	2018	
"Cobwebs and Strange"	Moon	Instrumental	A Quick One	1966	
"Cooks County"	Townshend	Daltrey; Townshend	It's Hard	1982	
"Cousin Kevin"	Entwistle	Entwistle	Tommy	1969	
"Cousin Kevin Model Child"	Townshend (credited as Entwistle)	Moon	Odds & Sods (1998 remaster)	1998	
"Cry If You Want"	Townshend	Daltrey	It's Hard	1982	
"Cut My Hair"	Townshend	Townshend; Daltrey	Quadrophenia	1973	
"Daddy Rolling Stone" (cover)	Otis Blackwell	Daltrey	Non-album single (B-side to "Anyway, Anyhow Anywhere" in the UK)	1965	
"Daily Records"	Townshend	Daltrey	Face Dances	1981	
"Dancing in the Street" (cover, live)	Marvin Gaye; William "Mickey" Stevenson; Ivy Jo Hunter	Daltrey; Entwistle	BBC Sessions	2000	
"Dangerous"	Entwistle	Daltrey	It's Hard	1982	
"Danny and My Ponies"	Townshend	Townshend	Who (deluxe edition)	2019	
"Detour"	Townshend	Daltrey	Who	2019	
"Did You Steal My Money"	Townshend	Daltrey	Face Dances	1981	
"Dig"	Townshend	Daltrey	Join Together (originally on The Iron Man: The Musical by Pete Townshend)	1990	
"Dogs"	Townshend	Daltrey	Non-album single	1968	
"Dogs (Part Two)"	Moon	Instrumental	Non-album single (B-side to "Pinball Wizard")	1969	
"Don't Look Away"	Townshend	Daltrey	A Quick One	1966	
"The Dirty Jobs"	Townshend	Daltrey	Quadrophenia	1973	
"Disguises"	Townshend	Daltrey	Ready Steady Who	1966	
"Do You Think It's Alright?"	Townshend	Daltrey	Tommy	1969	
"Doctor, Doctor"	Entwistle	Entwistle	Non-album single (B-side to "Pictures of Lily")	1967	
"Doctor Jimmy"	Townshend	Daltrey	Quadrophenia	1973	
"Don't Let Go the Coat"	Townshend	Daltrey	Face Dances	1981	
"Dr. Jekyll & Mr. Hyde"	Entwistle	Entwistle	Non-album single (B-side to "Call Me Lightning")	1968	
"Dreaming from the Waist"	Townshend	Daltrey	The Who by Numbers	1975	
"Drowned"	Townshend	Daltrey	Quadrophenia	1973	
"Early Morning Cold Taxi"	Daltrey; Dave "Cyrano" Langston	Daltrey	Thirty Years of Maximum R&B	1994	
"Eminence Front"	Townshend	Townshend	It's Hard	1982	
"Empty Glass"	Townshend	Townshend	Who Are You (1996 remaster)	1996	
"Endless Wire"	Townshend	Townshend	Endless Wire	2006	
"Eyesight to the Blind (The Hawker)"	Sonny Boy Williamson II	Daltrey	Tommy	1969	
"Face the Face" (cover, live)	Townshend	Townshend	Join Together	1990	
"Faith in Something Bigger"	Townshend	Daltrey	Odds & Sods	1974	
"Fiddle About"	Entwistle	Entwistle	Tommy	1969	
"Fire" (cover, guest appearance)	Arthur Brown; Vincent Crane; Mike Finesilver; Peter Ker	Daltrey	The Iron Man: The Musical by Pete Townshend	1989	
"Fortune Teller" (cover)	Allen Toussaint (under the pseudonym Naomi Neville)	Daltrey; Entwistle	Thirty Years of Maximum R&B	1994	
"Four Faces"	Townshend	Townshend	Quadrophenia (soundtrack)	1979	
"Fragments"	Townshend; Lawrence Ball	Daltrey	Endless Wire	2006	
"Fragments of Fragments"	Townshend; Lawrence Ball	Townshend	Endless Wire	2006	
"Get Out and Stay Out"	Townshend	Townshend	Quadrophenia (soundtrack)	1979	
"Getting in Tune"	Townshend	Daltrey	Who's Next	1971	
"Girl's Eyes"	Moon	Moon	Thirty Years of Maximum R&B	1994	
"Glittering Girl"	Townshend	Townshend	The Who Sell Out (1995 remaster)	1995	
"Glow Girl"	Townshend	Daltrey	Odds & Sods	1974	
"Go to the Mirror!"	Daltrey; Townshend	Daltrey; Townshend	Tommy	1969	
"God Speaks of Marty Robbins"	Townshend	Townshend	Endless Wire	2006	
"Got Nothing to Prove"	Townshend	Townshend	Who (deluxe edition)	2019	
"Goin' Down" (cover, live)	Don Nix	Daltrey	Two's Missing	1987	
"Going Mobile"	Townshend	Townshend	Who's Next	1971	
"Good Lovin'" (cover, live)	Rudy Clark; Arthur Resnick	Daltrey	BBC Sessions	2000	
"The Good's Gone"	Townshend	Daltrey	My Generation	1965	
"Greyhound Girl" (cover, live)	Townshend	Townshend	The Who Live at Lyon (Endless Wire bonus CD)	2006	
"Guitar and Pen"	Townshend	Daltrey	Who Are You	1978	
"Had Enough"	Entwistle	Daltrey; Entwistle	Who Are You	1978	
"Happy Jack"	Townshend	Entwistle; Daltrey	Non-album single	1966	
"Heart to Hang Onto" (cover, live)	Townshend	Townshend	Live at the Royal Albert Hall	2000	
"Heat Wave" (cover)	Holland-Dozier-Holland	Daltrey	A Quick One	1966	
"Heaven and Hell"	Entwistle	Entwistle	Non-album single (B-side to "Summertime Blues")	1970	
"Heinz Baked Beans"	Entwistle	Entwistle	The Who Sell Out	1967	
"Helpless Dancer"	Townshend	Daltrey	Quadrophenia	1973	
"Here For More"	Daltrey	Daltrey	Non-album single (B-side to "The Seeker")	1970	
"Here 'Tis" (cover)	Ellas McDaniel	Daltrey	Thirty Years of Maximum R&B	1994	
"Hero Ground Zero"	Townshend	Daltrey	Who	2019	
"How Can You Do It Alone"	Townshend	Daltrey	Face Dances	1981	
"How Many Friends"	Townshend	Daltrey	The Who by Numbers	1975	
"However Much I Booze"	Townshend	Townshend	The Who by Numbers	1975	
"I Am the Sea"	Townshend	Instrumental	Quadrophenia	1973	
"I Can See for Miles"	Townshend	Daltrey	The Who Sell Out	1967	
"I Can't Explain"	Townshend	Daltrey	Non-album single	1964	
"I Can't Reach You"	Townshend	Townshend	The Who Sell Out	1967	
"I Don't Even Know Myself"	Townshend	Daltrey	Non-album single (B-side to "Won't Get Fooled Again")	1971	
"I Don't Mind" (cover)	James Brown	Daltrey	My Generation	1965	
"I Don't Wanna Get Wise"	Townshend	Daltrey	Who	2019	
"I Like Nightmares"	Townshend	Townshend	Face Dances (1997 remaster)	1997	
"I Need You"	Moon	Moon	A Quick One	1966	
"I Was"	Townshend	Instrumental	Tommy (2003 remaster)	2003	
"I'll Be Back"	Townshend	Townshend	Who	2019	
"I'm a Boy"	Townshend	Daltrey; Townshend	Non-album single	1966	
"I'm a Man" (cover)	Ellas McDaniel	Daltrey	My Generation	1965	
"I'm Free"	Townshend	Daltrey	Tommy	1969	
"I'm One"	Townshend	Townshend	Quadrophenia	1973	
"I'm the Face"	Peter Meaden	Daltrey	Non-album single (B-side to "Zoot Suit")	1964	
"Imagine a Man"	Townshend	Daltrey	The Who by Numbers	1975	
"In a Hand or a Face"	Townshend	Daltrey	The Who by Numbers	1975	
"In the City"	Entwistle; Moon	Entwistle; Moon	Non-album single (B-side to "I'm a Boy")	1966	
"In the Ether"	Townshend	Townshend	Endless Wire	2006	
"In the Hall of the Mountain King" (cover)	Edvard Grieg	Instrumental	The Who Sell Out (1995 remaster)	1995	
"Instant Party Mixture"	Townshend	Daltrey	My Generation (2002 remaster)	2002	
"Is it in My Head?"	Townshend	Daltrey	Quadrophenia	1973	
"It's a Boy"	Townshend	Townshend	Tommy	1969	
"It's Hard"	Townshend	Daltrey	It's Hard	1982	
"It's in You"	Townshend	Daltrey	Face Dances (1997 remaster)	1997	
"It's Not Enough"	Townshend; Rachel Fuller	Daltrey	Endless Wire	2006	
"It's Not True"	Townshend	Daltrey	My Generation	1965	
"It's Your Turn"	Entwistle	Daltrey	It's Hard	1982	
"I've Been Away"	Entwistle	Entwistle	Non-album single (B-side to "Happy Jack" in the UK)	1966	
"I've Had Enough"	Townshend	Daltrey; Townshend	Quadrophenia	1973	
"I've Known No War"	Townshend	Daltrey	It's Hard	1982	
"Jaguar"	Townshend	Moon; Townshend	Thirty Years of Maximum R&B	1994	
"Join Together"	Townshend	Daltrey	Non-album single	1972	
"Joker James"	Townshend	Daltrey	Quadrophenia (soundtrack)	1979	
"Just You and Me, Darling" (cover, live)	Brown	Daltrey	BBC Sessions	2000	
"The Kids Are Alright"	Townshend	Daltrey	My Generation	1965	
"La-La-La-Lies"	Townshend	Daltrey	My Generation	1965	
"Land of Hope and Glory" (cover)	Edward Elgar	Townshend	A Quick One (1995 remaster)	1995	
"The Last Time" (cover)	Mick Jagger; Keith Richards	Daltrey	Non-album single	1967	
"Leaving Here"	Holland–Dozier–Holland	Daltrey	Who's Missing	1985	
"Let's See Action"	Townshend	Daltrey; Townshend	Non-album single	1971	
"Little Billy"	Townshend	Daltrey; Townshend	Odds & Sods	1974	
"Love Ain't for Keeping"	Townshend	Daltrey	Who's Next	1971	
"Long Live Rock"	Townshend	Townshend; Daltrey	Odds & Sods	1974	
"Love is Coming Down"	Townshend	Daltrey	Who Are You	1978	
"Love, Reign o'er Me"	Townshend	Daltrey	Quadrophenia	1973	
"Lubie (Come Back Home)" (cover)	Paul Revere Dick; Mark Lindsay	Daltrey	Who's Missing	1985	
"Magic Bus"	Townshend	Daltrey	Non-album single	1968	
"Man with Money" (cover)	The Everly Brothers	Daltrey	A Quick One (1995 remaster)	1995	
"Mary Anne with the Shaky Hand"	Townshend	Daltrey; Townshend	The Who Sell Out	1967	
"Medac"	Entwistle	Entwistle	The Who Sell Out	1967	
"Melancholia"	Townshend	Daltrey	Thirty Years of Maximum R&B	1994	
"Mike Post Theme"	Townshend	Daltrey	Endless Wire	2006	
"Miracle Cure"	Townshend	Townshend	Tommy	1969	
"Mirror Door"	Townshend	Daltrey	Endless Wire	2006	
"Motoring" (cover)	Ivy Jo Hunter; Phil Jones; William "Mickey" Stevenson	Daltrey	Two's Missing	1987	
"Much Too Much"	Townshend	Daltrey	My Generation	1965	
"Music Must Change"	Townshend	Daltrey	Who Are You	1978	
"My Generation"	Townshend	Daltrey	My Generation	1965	
"My Way" (cover)	Cochran; Capehart	Daltrey	Odds & Sods (1998 remaster)	1998	
"My Wife"	Entwistle	Entwistle	Who's Next	1971	
"Naked Eye"	Townshend	Daltrey; Townshend	Odds & Sods	1974	
"New Song"	Townshend	Daltrey	Who Are You	1978	
"No Road Romance"	Townshend	Townshend	Who Are You (1996 remaster)	1996	
"Now I'm a Farmer"	Townshend	Daltrey; Townshend; Moon	Odds & Sods	1974	
"Odorono"	Townshend	Townshend	The Who Sell Out	1967	
"Old Red Wine"	Townshend	Daltrey	Then and Now	2004	
"One at a Time"	Entwistle	Entwistle	It's Hard	1982	
"One Life's Enough"	Townshend	Daltrey	It's Hard	1982	
"Our Love Was"	Townshend	Townshend	The Who Sell Out	1967	
"Out in the Street"	Townshend	Daltrey	My Generation	1965	
"Overture"	Townshend	Townshend	Tommy	1969	
"The Ox"	Moon; Entwistle; Townshend; Nicky Hopkins	Instrumental	My Generation	1965	
"Pick Up the Peace"	Townshend	Daltrey	Endless Wire	2006	
"Pictures of Lily"	Townshend	Daltrey	Non-album single	1967	
"Pinball Wizard"	Townshend	Daltrey; Townshend	Tommy	1969	
"Please, Please, Please" (cover)	Brown; Johnny Terry	Daltrey	My Generation	1965	
"Postcard"	Entwistle	Entwistle	Odds & Sods	1974	
"The Punk and the Godfather"	Townshend	Daltrey; Townshend	Quadrophenia	1973	
"Pure and Easy"	Townshend	Daltrey; Townshend	Odds & Sods	1974	
"Put the Money Down"	Townshend	Daltrey	Odds & Sods	1974	
"Quadrophenia"	Townshend	Instrumental	Quadrophenia	1973	
"The Quiet One"	Entwistle	Entwistle	Face Dances	1981	
"Rael 1"	Townshend	Daltrey	The Who Sell Out	1967	
"Rael 2"	Townshend	Townshend	Thirty Years of Maximum R&B	1994	
"Real Good Looking Boy"	Townshend; Luigi Creatore; Hugo Peretti; George David Weiss	Daltrey	Then and Now	2004	
"The Real Me"	Townshend	Daltrey	Quadrophenia	1973	
"Relax"	Townshend	Daltrey	The Who Sell Out	1967	
"Relay"	Townshend	Daltrey	Non-album single	1972	
"Road Runner" (cover, live)	Ellas McDaniel	Daltrey	Who's Next (2003 remaster)	2003	
"The Rock"	Townshend	Instrumental	Quadrophenia	1973	
"Rockin' In Rage"	Townshend	Daltrey	Who	2019	
"Rough Boys" (cover, live)	Pete Townshend	Townshend	Join Together	1990	
"Run, Run, Run"	Townshend	Daltrey	A Quick One	1966	
"Sally Simpson"	Townshend	Daltrey	Tommy	1969	
"Sand"	Townshend	Townshend	Who (deluxe edition)	2019	
"Saturday Night's Alright for Fighting" (cover)	Elton John; Bernie Taupin	Daltrey	Two Rooms: Celebrating the Songs of Elton John & Bernie Taupin	1991	
"Sea and Sand"	Townshend	Daltrey	Quadrophenia	1973	
"See Me, Feel Me"	Townshend	Daltrey	Tommy	1969	
"See My Way"	Daltrey	Daltrey	A Quick One	1966	
"The Seeker"	Townshend	Daltrey	Non-album single	1970	
"Sensation"	Townshend	Townshend	Tommy	1969	
"Shakin' All Over" (cover, live)	Johnny Kidd; Guy Robinson	Daltrey	Live at Leeds	1970	
"She Rocked My World"	Townshend	Daltrey	Who	2019	
"Shout and Shimmy" (cover)	Brown	Daltrey	Non-album single (B-side to "My Generation")	1965	
"Silas Stingy"	Entwistle	Entwistle	The Who Sell Out	1967	
"Sister Disco"	Townshend	Daltrey; Townshend	Who Are You	1978	
"Slip Kid"	Townshend	Daltrey	The Who by Numbers	1975	
"Smash the Mirror"	Townshend	Daltrey	Tommy	1969	
"Sodding About"	Entwistle; Moon; Townshend	Instrumental	The Who Sell Out (1995 remaster)	1995	
"Somebody Saved Me"	Townshend	Daltrey	Face Dances (1997 remaster)	1997	
"Someone's Coming"	Entwistle	Daltrey	Non-album single (B-side to "I Can See for Miles" in the UK)	1967	
"The Song Is Over"	Townshend	Townshend; Daltrey	Who's Next	1971	
"Sound Round"	Townshend	Daltrey	Endless Wire	2006	
"So Sad About Us"	Townshend	Daltrey	A Quick One	1966	
"Sparks"	Townshend	Instrumental	Tommy	1969	
"Spoonful" (cover)	Willie Dixon	Daltrey	Live at the Isle of Wight Festival 1970	1996	
"Squeeze Box"	Townshend	Daltrey	The Who by Numbers	1975	
"Street Song"	Townshend	Daltrey	Who	2019	
"Substitute"	Townshend	Daltrey	Non-album single	1966	
"Success Story"	Entwistle	Daltrey; Entwistle	The Who by Numbers	1975	
"Summertime Blues" (cover, live)	Cochran; Capehart	Daltrey; Entwistle	Live at Leeds	1970	
"Sunrise"	Townshend	Townshend	The Who Sell Out	1967	
"Tattoo"	Townshend	Daltrey; Townshend	The Who Sell Out	1967	
"There's a Doctor"	Townshend	Townshend	Tommy	1969	
"They Are All in Love"	Townshend	Daltrey	The Who by Numbers	1975	
"They Made My Dream Come True"	Townshend	Townshend	Endless Wire	2006	
"This Gun Will Misfire"	Townshend	Townshend	Who (deluxe edition)	2019	
"Tea and Theatre"	Townshend	Daltrey	Endless Wire	2006	
"Time Is Passing"	Townshend	Daltrey	Odds & Sods (1998 remaster)	1998	
"Tommy Can You Hear Me?"	Townshend	Daltrey; Townshend; Entwistle	Tommy	1969	
"Tommy's Holiday Camp"	Townshend (credited as Moon)	Townshend	Tommy	1969	
"Too Much of Anything"	Townshend	Daltrey	Odds & Sods	1974	
"Trilby's Piano"	Townshend	Townshend	Endless Wire	2006	
"Trick of the Light"	Entwistle	Daltrey	Who Are You	1978	
"Trying to Get Through"	Townshend	Townshend	Tommy (2003 remaster)	2003	
"Twist and Shout" (cover)	Phil Medley; Bert Russell	Entwistle	Who's Last	1984	
"Two Thousand Years"	Townshend	Daltrey	Endless Wire	2006	
"Under My Thumb" (cover)	Jagger; Richards	Daltrey	Non-album single (B-side to "The Last Time")	1967	
"Underture"	Townshend	Instrumental	Tommy	1969	
"Unholy Trinity"	Townshend	Daltrey	Endless Wire	2006	
"Waspman"	Moon	Moon	Non-album single (B-side to "Relay")	1972	
"Water"	Townshend	Daltrey	Non-album single (B-side to "5:15")	1973	
"We Close Tonight"	Townshend	Entwistle; Moon	Odds & Sods (1998 remaster)	1998	
"We Got a Hit"	Townshend	Daltrey	Endless Wire	2006	
"Welcome"	Townshend	Daltrey	Tommy	1969	
"We're Not Gonna Take It"	Townshend	Daltrey	Tommy	1969	
"When I Was a Boy"	Entwistle	Entwistle	Non-album single (B-side to "Let's See Action")	1971	
"Whiskey Man"	Entwistle	Entwistle	A Quick One	1966	
"Who Are You"	Townshend	Daltrey	Who Are You	1978	
"Why Did I Fall for That"	Townshend	Daltrey	It's Hard	1982	
"Wire & Glass"	Townshend	Daltrey	Wire & Glass	2006	
"Won't Get Fooled Again"	Townshend	Daltrey	Who's Next	1971	
"You"	Entwistle	Daltrey	Face Dances	1981	
"You Better You Bet"	Townshend	Daltrey	Face Dances	1981	
"You Stand by Me"	Townshend	Townshend	Endless Wire	2006	
"Young Man Blues" (cover, live)	Mose Allison	Daltrey	Live at Leeds	1970	
"Zoot Suit"	Peter Meaden	Daltrey	Non-album single	1964	
