= Maximum As & Bs =

Box set by the Who
- Released: 27 October 2017
- Labels: Polydor; UMC

The Who chronology
The Who Hits 50! (2014)	Maximum As & Bs (2017)	Live at the Fillmore East 1968 (2018)

Maximum As & Bs: The Complete Singles is a box set by the English rock band the Who, released on 27 October 2017 by Polydor Records and Universal Music Enterprises subsidiary UMC. It collects singles and extended play (EP) tracks from the Who's entire career, spanning their debut single as the High Numbers, "Zoot Suit/I'm the Face" (1964), to "Be Lucky" from The Who Hits 50! (2014).

== Critical reception ==
AllMusic's Stephen Thomas Erlewine called non-album tracks such as "The Seeker", "Don't Know Myself", "Let's See Action", "Join Together", and "Relay" "some of [Pete] Townshend's best songs."

== Track listing ==
All tracks are written by Pete Townshend, except where noted.

Disc one
No.	Title	Writer(s)	Length
1.	"Zoot Suit" (as The High Numbers) (single, 1964)	Peter Meaden	1:59
2.	"I'm the Face" (as The High Numbers) (B-side to "Zoot Suit")	Meaden	2:33
3.	"I Can't Explain" (single, 1964)		2:04
4.	"Bald Headed Woman" (B-side to "I Can't Explain")	Shel Talmy	2:09
5.	"Anyway, Anyhow, Anywhere" (single, 1965)	Townshend; Roger Daltrey	2:42
6.	"Daddy Rolling Stone" (B-side to "Anyway, Anyhow, Anywhere")	Otis Blackwell	2:48
7.	"My Generation" (from My Generation, single released 1965)		3:18
8.	"Shout and Shimmy" (B-side to "My Generation")	James Brown	3:17
9.	"Circles/Instant Party" (from The Who Sings My Generation, planned single cancelled)		3:12
10.	"Instant Party Mixture" (B-side to cancelled "Circles/Instant Party" single)		3:28
11.	"A Legal Matter" (from My Generation, single released 1966)		2:49
12.	"The Kids Are Alright" (from My Generation, single released 1966)		3:05
13.	"The Ox" (from My Generation, B-side to "The Kids Are Alright")	Townshend; John Entwistle; Keith Moon; Nicky Hopkins	3:49
14.	"La-La-La-Lies" (from My Generation, single released 1966)		2:15
15.	"The Good's Gone" (from My Generation, B-side to "La-La-La-Lies")		4:01

Disc two
No.	Title	Writer(s)	Length
1.	"Substitute" (single, 1966)		3:47
2.	"Circles" (B-side to "Substitute")		2:29
3.	"Waltz for a Pig" (as The Who Orchestra) (B-side to "Substitute")		2:25
4.	"I'm a Boy" (single, 1966)		2:41
5.	"In the City" (B-side to "I'm a Boy")	Moon; Entwistle	2:22
6.	"Disguises" (from Ready Steady Who, 1966)		3:12
7.	"Batman" (from Ready Steady Who)	Neal Hefti	1:25
8.	"Bucket 'T'" (from Ready Steady Who)	Don Altfeld; Roger Christian; Dean Torrence	2:10
9.	"Barbara Ann" (from Ready Steady Who)	Fred Fassert	2:01
10.	"Happy Jack" (single, 1966)		2:11
11.	"I've Been Away" (B-side to "Happy Jack")	Entwistle	2:09
12.	"Pictures of Lily" (single, 1967)		2:45
13.	"Doctor, Doctor" (B-side to "Pictures of Lily")	Entwistle	3:01
14.	"The Last Time" (single, 1967)	Jagger–Richards	2:51
15.	"Under My Thumb" (B-side to "The Last Time")	Jagger–Richards	2:38
16.	"I Can See for Miles" (from The Who Sell Out, single released 1967)		4:04
17.	"Someone's Coming" (B-side to "I Can See for Miles")	Entwistle	2:31
18.	"Dogs" (single, 1968)		3:06
19.	"Call Me Lightning" (B-side to "Dogs")		2:25
20.	"Magic Bus" (single, 1968)		3:19
21.	"Dr. Jekyll and Mr. Hyde" (B-side to "Magic Bus")	Entwistle	2:35

Disc three
No.	Title	Writer(s)	Length
1.	"Pinball Wizard" (from Tommy, single released 1969)		3:01
2.	"Dogs Part Two" (B-side to "Pinball Wizard")	Moon	2:27
3.	"The Seeker" (single, 1970)		3:13
4.	"Here for More" (B-side to "The Seeker")	Daltrey	2:25
5.	"Summertime Blues" (from Live at Leeds, single released 1970)	Eddie Cochran; Jerry Capehart	3:24
6.	"Heaven and Hell" (B-side to "Summertime Blues")	Entwistle	3:34
7.	"See Me, Feel Me/Listening to You" (from Tommy, single released 1970)		3:38
8.	"Overture" (from Tommy, B-side to "See Me, Feel Me/Listening to You")		4:01
9.	"Christmas" (from Tommy, promotional single released 1970)		1:56
10.	"I'm Free" (from Tommy, single released 1969)		2:41
11.	"Won't Get Fooled Again" (from Who's Next, single released 1971)		3:38
12.	"Don't Know Myself" (B-side to "Won't Get Fooled Again")		5:00
13.	"Let's See Action" (single, 1971)		3:58
14.	"When I Was a Boy" (B-side to "Let's See Action")	Entwistle	3:29
15.	"Join Together" (single, 1972)		4:22
16.	"Baby Don't You Do It" (B-side to "Join Together")	Holland–Dozier–Holland	6:15
17.	"Relay" (single, 1972)		3:35
18.	"Waspman" (B-side to "Relay")	Moon	3:03

Disc four
No.	Title	Writer(s)	Length
1.	"5:15" (from Quadrophenia, single released 1973)		4:20
2.	"Water" (B-side to "5:15")		4:39
3.	"Listening to You/See Me, Feel Me" (from Tommy soundtrack, 1975)		4:18
4.	"Overture" (from Tommy soundtrack)		5:02
5.	"Squeeze Box" (from The Who by Numbers, single released 1975)		2:41
6.	"Success Story" (from The Who by Numbers, B-side to "Squeeze Box")	Entwistle	3:23
7.	"Who Are You" (from Who Are You, single released 1978)		5:02
8.	"Had Enough" (from Who Are You, single released 1978)	Entwistle	4:31
9.	"Long Live Rock" (from Odds & Sods, single released 1979)		3:59
10.	"My Wife" (live) (B-side to "Long Live Rock")	Entwistle	3:28
11.	"5:15" (from Quadrophenia soundtrack, single released 1979)		4:50
12.	"I'm One" (from Quadrophenia soundtrack, B-side to "5:15")		2:41
13.	"You Better You Bet" (from Face Dances, single released 1981)		3:58
14.	"The Quiet One" (from Face Dances, B-side to "You Better You Bet")	Entwistle	3:08
15.	"Don't Let Go the Coat" (from Face Dances, single released 1981)		3:44
16.	"You" (from Face Dances, B-side to "Don't Let Go the Coat")	Entwistle	4:31

Disc five
No.	Title	Writer(s)	Length
1.	"Athena" (from It's Hard, single released 1982)		3:49
2.	"A Man Is a Man" (from It's Hard, B-side to "Athena")		3:54
3.	"Eminence Front" (from It's Hard, single released 1982)		5:41
4.	"It's Your Turn" (from It's Hard, B-side to "Eminence Front")	Entwistle	3:41
5.	"Twist and Shout" (live) (from Who's Last, single released 1984)	Phil Medley; Bert Russell	3:59
6.	"I Can't Explain" (live) (from Who's Last, B-side to "Twist and Shout")		2:39
7.	"Bony Moronie" (live) (from Won't Get Fooled Again, 1988)	Larry Williams	3:33
8.	"Join Together" (live) (from Join Together, single released 1990)		5:19
9.	"I Can See for Miles" (live) (from Join Together, B-side to "Join Together")		3:54
10.	"Behind Blue Eyes" (live) (from Join Together, B-side to "Join Together")		3:37
11.	"Real Good Looking Boy" (from Then and Now, single released 2004)	Townshend; Luigi Creatore; Hugo Peretti; George David Weiss	5:41
12.	"Old Red Wine" (from Then and Now, B-side to "Real Good Looking Boy")		3:43
13.	"Sound Round" (from Wire & Glass, 2006)		1:22
14.	"Pick Up the Peace" (from Wire & Glass)		1:27
15.	"Endless Wire" (from Wire & Glass)		1:51
16.	"We Got a Hit" (from Wire & Glass)		1:18
17.	"They Made My Dream Come True" (from Wire & Glass)		1:12
18.	"Mirror Door" (from Wire & Glass)		4:14
19.	"Be Lucky" (from The Who Hits 50!, single released 2014)		3:17
20.	"I Can't Explain" (2014 stereo remix) (B-side to Record Store Day "Be Lucky" single, 2015)		2:05
