= The Who Hits 50! (album) =

Compilation album by the Who
- Released: 27 October 2014
- Recorded: 1964–2014
- Genre: Rock; power pop; hard rock
- Length: 155:21
- Label: Geffen (US/Canada); Polydor (UK)

The Who chronology
Quadrophenia Live in London (2014)	The Who Hits 50! (2014)	Live at the Fillmore East 1968 (2018)

Singles from The Who Hits 50!
- 1. "Be Lucky" Released: September 2014

Professional ratings
Review scores
Source	Rating
AllMusic	4.5/5 stars

The Who Hits 50! is a compilation of singles by the English rock band the Who, released on 27 October 2014 by Polydor Records. The two-disc set contains every single released by the band in the United Kingdom, with the exceptions of: "A Legal Matter" and "La-La-La-Lies" from 1966; and "Long Live Rock" and the remake of "I'm One" from 1979. At the same time it also contains every single by the band released in the United States throughout their career, with the exceptions of: "The Real Me" from 1974; the reissue of "Substitute" from 1976; and "Long Live Rock" from 1979. A condensed single-disc standard edition appeared as well, both versions in conjunction with the band's 50th anniversary and associated tour of the same name. The album is notable for containing singles generally not included on other compilation albums, such as the band's Rolling Stones cover "The Last Time" done as an act of solidarity while Mick Jagger and Keith Richards were facing an incarceration period, along with other lesser-known singles "Dogs" and "Call Me Lightning".

The first disc includes every song from the compilation Meaty Beaty Big and Bouncy (1971) with the exception of "A Legal Matter", and the second disc includes "Be Lucky", a track released as a single in support of the compilation and recorded during 2014 sessions for a proposed new studio album. The song is the first new material released by the Who since their eleventh studio album, Endless Wire (2006).

The selections were remastered by Jon Astley, and the cover art by Richard Evans and packaging reflects the band's association with the pop art of the 1960s. On the two-disc set, the liner notes incorrectly list Pete Townshend as the writer of the track "Trick of the Light" when it was in fact written by John Entwistle.

== Track listing ==
=== Original release ===
All tracks are written by Pete Townshend, except where noted.

Disc one
No.	Title	Writer(s)	Original album	Length
1.	"Zoot Suit" (billed as the High Numbers)	Peter Meaden	1964 single	1:59
2.	"I Can't Explain"		1964 single	2:05
3.	"Anyway, Anyhow, Anywhere"	Townshend, Roger Daltrey	1965 single	2:43
4.	"My Generation"		My Generation, 1965	3:18
5.	"Substitute"		1966 single	3:45
6.	"The Kids Are Alright"		extended version; found on My Generation (UK)	3:06
7.	"I'm a Boy" (mono version)		1966 single	2:38
8.	"Happy Jack"		1966 single (UK); Happy Jack (US), 1966	2:14
9.	"Boris the Spider"	John Entwistle	A Quick One, 1966	2:30
10.	"Pictures of Lily"		1967 single	2:44
11.	"The Last Time"	Mick Jagger, Keith Richards	1967 single	2:59
12.	"I Can See for Miles" (single stereo LP version)		The Who Sell Out, 1967	4:08
13.	"Call Me Lightning"		B-side to "Dogs" single (UK); 1968 single (US)	2:19
14.	"Dogs"		1968 single	3:01
15.	"Magic Bus" (mono extended version)		1968 single (UK); Magic Bus: The Who on Tour (US), 1968; extended version from Meaty Beaty Big and Bouncy, 1971	4:36
16.	"Pinball Wizard"		Tommy, 1969	3:03
17.	"I'm Free"		Tommy	2:41
18.	"The Seeker"		1970 single; later released on Meaty Beaty Big and Bouncy	3:12
19.	"Summertime Blues"	Eddie Cochran, Jerry Capehart	Live at Leeds, 1970	3:22
20.	"See Me, Feel Me" (single version)		Tommy	3:30
21.	"Won't Get Fooled Again" (single version)		Who's Next, 1971	3:40
22.	"Let's See Action"		1971 single	3:57
23.	"Bargain"		Who's Next	5:33
24.	"Behind Blue Eyes"		Who's Next	3:42
Total length:				77:20

Disc two
No.	Title	Writer(s)	Original album	Length
1.	"Baba O'Riley"		Who's Next	5:08
2.	"Join Together"		1972 single	4:22
3.	"Relay"		1972 single	3:52
4.	"5:15"		Quadrophenia, 1973	4:48
5.	"Love, Reign o'er Me"		Quadrophenia	5:56
6.	"Postcard"	Entwistle	Odds & Sods, 1974	3:27
7.	"Squeeze Box"		The Who by Numbers, 1975	2:40
8.	"Slip Kid"		The Who by Numbers	4:36
9.	"Who Are You" (edited album version)		Who Are You, 1978	5:14
10.	"Trick of the Light"	Entwistle	Who Are You	4:27
11.	"You Better You Bet"		Face Dances, 1981	5:37
12.	"Don't Let Go the Coat"		Face Dances	3:44
13.	"Athena"		It's Hard, 1982	3:46
14.	"Eminence Front"		It's Hard	5:39
15.	"It's Hard"		It's Hard	3:47
16.	"Real Good Looking Boy" (radio edit)	Townshend, Hugo Peretti, Luigi Creatore, George David Weiss	Then and Now, 2004	3:55
17.	"It's Not Enough"	Townshend, Rachel Fuller	Endless Wire, 2006	4:03
18.	"Be Lucky"		new song, 2014	3:19
Total length:				78:25

=== Single disc standard edition ===
No.	Title	Writer(s)	Original album	Length
1.	"Zoot Suit" (billed as the High Numbers)	Meaden	1964 single	1:59
2.	"I Can't Explain"		1964 single	2:05
3.	"Anyway, Anyhow, Anywhere"	Townshend, Daltrey	1965 single	2:43
4.	"My Generation"		My Generation	3:18
5.	"Substitute"		1966 single	3:45
6.	"I'm a Boy" (mono version)		1966 single	2:38
7.	"Happy Jack"		1966 single (UK); Happy Jack (US)	2:14
8.	"Pictures of Lily"		1967 single	2:44
9.	"I Can See for Miles" (single stereo LP version)		The Who Sell Out	4:08
10.	"Magic Bus" (mono extended version)		1968 single (UK); Magic Bus: The Who on Tour (US); extended version from Meaty Beaty Big and Bouncy	4:36
11.	"Pinball Wizard"		Tommy	3:00
12.	"The Seeker"		1970 single; later released as part of Meaty Beaty Big and Bouncy	3:12
13.	"Won't Get Fooled Again" (single version)		Who's Next, 1971	3:40
14.	"Baba O'Riley"		Who's Next	5:08
15.	"Bargain"		Who's Next	5:33
16.	"Join Together"		1972 single	4:22
17.	"5:15" (single version)		Quadrophenia, 1973	4:48
18.	"Squeeze Box"		The Who by Numbers, 1975	2:40
19.	"Who Are You" (single version)		Who Are You, 1978	5:14
20.	"Real Good Looking Boy" (radio edit)	Townshend, Hugo Peretti, Luigi Creatore, George David Weiss	Then and Now, 2004	3:55
21.	"Be Lucky"		new song, 2014	3:19

== Personnel ==
- Roger Daltrey – lead vocals, percussion, harmonica, rhythm guitar
- John Entwistle – vocals, bass guitar, brass instruments, keyboards on disc one and disc two through "It's Hard" except "The Last Time"
- Kenney Jones – drums, percussion on disc two "You Better You Bet" through "It's Hard"
- Keith Moon – drums, percussion on disc one and disc two through "Trick of the Light"
- Pete Townshend – vocals, six and twelve-string acoustic and electric guitars, keyboards, synthesizer, jews harp, harmonica, accordion, banjo; bass guitar on "The Last Time"

Additional musicians

- Dave Arbus – violin on "Baba O'Riley
- Rod Argent – piano on "Who Are You"
- John "Rabbit" Bundrick – keyboards, backing vocals on "You Better You Bet", "Athena", "It's Hard", and "It's Not Enough"
- Jolyon Dixon – acoustic guitar on "It's Not Enough"
- Andy Fairweather-Low – backing vocals on "Who Are You"
- Rachel Fuller – keyboards on "It's Not Enough"
- Peter Huntington – drums on "It's Not Enough"
- The Ivy League – backing vocals, handclaps, piano on "I Can't Explain"
- Greg Lake – bass guitar on "Real Good Looking Boy"
- Billy Nicholls – backing vocals on "Be Lucky"
- Pino Palladino – bass guitar on "Be Lucky"
- Jimmy Page – twelve-string rhythm guitar on "I Can't Explain"
- Stuart Ross – bass guitar on "It's Not Enough"
- Chris Stainton – piano on "5:15"
- Zak Starkey – drums, percussion on "Real Good Looking Boy" and "Be Lucky"
- Simon Townshend – guitars, keyboards, backing vocals on "Real Good Looking Boy" and "Be Lucky"
- Mick Talbot – keyboards on "Be Lucky"

Design

- Richard Evans – album cover design, art direction
- John Kosh - Who logo design

== Charts ==
Chart performance for The Who Hits 50!
Chart (2014–2016)	Peak position
Austrian Albums (Ö3 Austria)	69
Belgian Albums (Ultratop Flanders)	142
Belgian Albums (Ultratop Wallonia)	175
Canadian Albums (Billboard)	44
Dutch Albums (Album Top 100)	95
Irish Albums (IRMA)	76
Scottish Albums (OCC)	14
UK Albums (OCC)	11
US Billboard 200	93
US Top Hard Rock Albums (Billboard)	5
US Top Rock Albums (Billboard)	19

== Certifications ==
Certifications for The Who Hits 50!
Region	Certification	Certified units/sales
United Kingdom (BPI)	Platinum	300,000^{‡}
^{‡} Sales+streaming figures based on certification alone.
