= Thirty Years of Maximum R&B =

Box set by the Who
- Released: 5 July 1994
- Recorded: 1964–1991
- Genre: Rock
- Length: 295:54
- Label: Polydor; MCA; Geffen

The Who chronology
Join Together (1990)	Thirty Years of Maximum R&B (1994)	My Generation: The Very Best of The Who (1996)

Professional ratings
Review scores
Source	Rating
AllMusic	3/5 stars
The Encyclopedia of Popular Music	5/5 stars
MusicHound	4/5
Music Week	4/5 stars
Q	5/5 stars
Rolling Stone	5/5 stars
The Rolling Stone Album Guide	3/5 stars

Thirty Years of Maximum R&B is a box set by the English rock band the Who, released by Polydor Records internationally and by MCA Records in the U.S.; since 2003, it has been issued in America by Geffen Records. The set consists of four CDs that span the Who's career from their early days when they were known as The High Numbers 1964 to their 1991 cover of Elton John's "Saturday Night's Alright for Fighting". It contains well-known tracks from studio albums, rarities, interviews, commercials, and sketches. A video titled Thirty Years of Maximum R&B Live was also released in 1994.

== Track listing ==
All songs written by Pete Townshend except where noted. Any tracks with ** are commercials or dialogues recorded for BBC radio. Background music on 'Poetry Cornered' is 'Laguna Sunrise' taken from Black Sabbath's 1972 album, Black Sabbath Vol. 4.

=== Disc one ===
No.	Title	Original release	Length
1.	"Pete Dialogue" (Live at the Long Beach Arena, 10 December 1971)	Previously unreleased	0:21
2.	"I'm the Face" (Peter Meaden; as The High Numbers)	1964 single B-side	2:27
3.	"Here 'Tis" (Ellas McDaniel; as The High Numbers)	Previously unreleased	2:08
4.	"Zoot Suit" (Meaden; as The High Numbers)	1964 single A-side	1:57
5.	"Leaving Here" (Holland-Dozier-Holland; erroneously credited as The High Numbers)	Who's Missing	2:47
6.	"I Can't Explain"	1965 single A-side	2:03
7.	"Anyway, Anyhow, Anywhere" (Townshend, Roger Daltrey;)	1965 single A-side	2:38
8.	"Daddy Rolling Stone" (Otis Blackwell)	UK B-side of "Anyway, Anyhow, Anywhere"	2:49
9.	"My Generation"	My Generation	3:17
10.	"The Kids Are Alright"	My Generation	3:05
11.	"The Ox" (Townshend, Keith Moon, John Entwistle, Nicky Hopkins)	My Generation	3:37
12.	"A Legal Matter"	My Generation	2:46
13.	"Pete Dialogue" (Live at Leeds University, 1970)	Live at Leeds	0:57
14.	"Substitute" (Live at Leeds University, 1970)	Live at Leeds	2:08
15.	"I'm a Boy ("No Horns" remix)"	Previously unreleased	2:36
16.	"Disguises"	Ready Steady Who	3:20
17.	"Happy Jack Jingle"	Previously unreleased	0:31
18.	"Happy Jack"	1966 single A-side	2:11
19.	"Boris the Spider" (John Entwistle)	A Quick One	2:27
20.	"So Sad About Us"	A Quick One	2:59
21.	"A Quick One, While He's Away" (Original studio version/Live at the Rolling Stones Rock 'n' Roll Circus, 1968)	Previously unreleased remix	9:39
22.	"Pictures of Lily"	1967 single A-side	2:43
23.	"Early Morning Cold Taxi" (Dave "Cy" Langston, Daltrey)	Previously unreleased	3:03
24.	"Coke 2**"	Previously unreleased	0:48
25.	"(This Could Be) The Last Time" (Mick Jagger, Keith Richards)	1967 single A-side	2:59
26.	"I Can't Reach You"	The Who Sell Out	3:03
27.	"Girl's Eyes" (Moon)	Previously unreleased	3:06
28.	"Bag O'Nails**"	Previously unreleased	0:05
29.	"Call Me Lightning"	1968 single A-side	2:20

=== Disc two ===
No.	Title	...	Length
1.	"Rotosound Strings**"	The Who Sell Out	0:06
2.	"I Can See for Miles"	The Who Sell Out	4:14
3.	"Mary Anne with the Shaky Hand"	The Who Sell Out	2:07
4.	"Armenia City in the Sky" (Speedy Keen)	The Who Sell Out	3:13
5.	"Tattoo"	The Who Sell Out	2:41
6.	"Our Love Was"	The Who Sell Out	3:06
7.	"Rael 1"	The Who Sell Out	5:42
8.	"Rael 2"	Previously unreleased	0:52
9.	"Track Records/Premier Drums**" ("Track Records" previously unreleased)	The Who Sell Out	0:31
10.	"Sunrise"	The Who Sell Out	3:03
11.	"Russell Harty Dialogue**"	The Kids Are Alright	0:21
12.	"Jaguar"	Previously unreleased	2:03
13.	"Melancholia"	Previously unreleased	3:18
14.	"Fortune Teller" (Naomi Neville)	previously unreleased	2:18
15.	"Magic Bus"	1968 single A-side	3:16
16.	"Little Billy"	Odds & Sods	2:16
17.	"Dogs"	1968 single A-side	3:01
18.	"Overture"	Tommy	3:53
19.	"The Acid Queen"	Tommy	3:33
20.	"Abbie Hoffman Incident" (Live at Woodstock, 1969)	Previously unreleased	0:16
21.	"Sparks" (Live at Woodstock, 1969)	The Kids Are Alright	3:53
22.	"Pinball Wizard"	Tommy	3:00
23.	"I'm Free"	Tommy	2:38
24.	"See Me, Feel Me" (Original studio version/Live at Leeds University, 1970)	Previously unreleased remix	3:31
25.	"Heaven and Hell" (Entwistle)	1970 B-side of "Summertime Blues"	3:33
26.	"Pete Dialogue" (Live at Leeds University, 1970)	Live at Leeds	0:36
27.	"Young Man Blues" (Mose Allison)	Live at Leeds	4:38
28.	"Summertime Blues (Remix)" (Eddie Cochran, Jerry Capehart)	Live at Leeds	3:22

=== Disc three ===
No.	Title	...	Length
1.	"Shakin' All Over" (Fred Heath)	Live at Leeds	4:06
2.	"Baba O'Riley"	Who's Next	4:56
3.	"Bargain" (Live at the San Francisco Civic Auditorium, 1971)	Who's Missing	4:54
4.	"Pure and Easy"	Odds & Sods	5:10
5.	"The Song Is Over"	Who's Next	6:09
6.	"Studio Dialogue"	Previously unreleased	0:47
7.	"Behind Blue Eyes"	Who's Next	3:39
8.	"Won't Get Fooled Again"	Who's Next	8:30
9.	"The Seeker"	1970 single A-side	3:21
10.	"Bony Moronie" (Larry Williams; live at the Young Vic Theater, London, 1971)	Won't Get Fooled Again (EP)	3:18
11.	"Let's See Action"	1971 single A-side	3:54
12.	"Join Together"	1972 single A-side	4:22
13.	"Relay"	1972 single A-side	4:00
14.	"The Real Me" (1979 re-recording)	Previously unreleased	3:29
15.	"5:15" (Single edit)	Quadrophenia	4:18
16.	"Bell Boy"	Quadrophenia	4:54
17.	"Love, Reign o'er Me"	Quadrophenia	4:51

=== Disc four ===
No.	Title	...	Length
1.	"Long Live Rock"	Odds & Sods	3:54
2.	"Life with the Moons**"	Previously unreleased	1:43
3.	"Naked Eye" (Live at the Young Vic Theatre, London, 1971)	Previously unreleased	5:00
4.	"University Challenge**"	Previously unreleased	0:30
5.	"Slip Kid"	The Who By Numbers	4:09
6.	"Poetry Cornered**"	Previously unreleased	0:39
7.	"Dreaming from the Waist" (Live at the Swansea Football Ground, 1976)	Previously unreleased	4:08
8.	"Blue Red and Grey"	The Who By Numbers	2:45
9.	"Life with the Moons 2**"	Previously unreleased	0:46
10.	"Squeeze Box"	The Who By Numbers	2:39
11.	"My Wife" (Entwistle; live at the Swansea Football Stadium, 1976)	Previously unreleased	4:14
12.	"Who Are You"	Who Are You	5:00
13.	"Music Must Change"	Who Are You	4:36
14.	"Sister Disco"	Who Are You	4:19
15.	"Guitar and Pen"	Who Are You	5:48
16.	"You Better You Bet"	Face Dances	5:33
17.	"Eminence Front"	It's Hard	5:26
18.	"Twist and Shout" (Bert Russell, Phil Medley; live at Shea Stadium, New York 1982)	Previously unreleased	3:01
19.	"I'm a Man" (McDaniel; live at Radio City Music Hall, New York, 1989)	Previously unreleased	6:11
20.	"Pete Dialogue" (Live at the Fillmore West, San Francisco, 1969)	Previously unreleased	0:37
21.	"Saturday Night's Alright (For Fighting)" (Elton John, Bernie Taupin)	Two Rooms: Celebrating the Songs of Elton John & Bernie Taupin	4:33

== Chart performance ==
Chart performance for Who's Better, Who's Best
Chart (1988)	Peak position
Australian Albums (ARIA)	138
Scottish Albums (OCC)	60
UK Albums (OCC)	48
US Billboard 200	170

== Certifications ==
Certifications for Who's Better, Who's Best
Region	Certification	Certified units/sales
United States (RIAA)	Gold	500,000^{^}
^{^} Shipments figures based on certification alone.

== Personnel ==
The Who

- Roger Daltrey - vocals, harmonica, percussion, guitar
- Kenney Jones - drums on "The Real Me", "You Better You Bet", "Eminence Front", and "Twist and Shout"
- John Entwistle - bass guitar, horns, piano, vocals
- Keith Moon - drums and percussion (all except noted), vocals on "Bell Boy" and "Girl's Eyes"
- Pete Townshend - guitars, synthesizer, piano, organ, vocals

Additional musicians

- Jon Astley - drums on "Saturday Night's Alright (For Fighting)"
- Steve "Boltz" Bolton - guitar on "I'm a Man"
- John "Rabbit" Bundrick - keyboards on "The Real Me" and "I'm a Man"
- Jody Linscott - percussion on "I'm a Man"
- Jimmy Page - guitar on "I Can't Explain"
- Simon Phillips - drums on "I'm a Man"

Design

- Design & Art Direction by Richard Evans
