= Quadrophenia Alley =

Historic film location, Brighton, England

Coordinates: 50.8202601°N 0.1393227°W

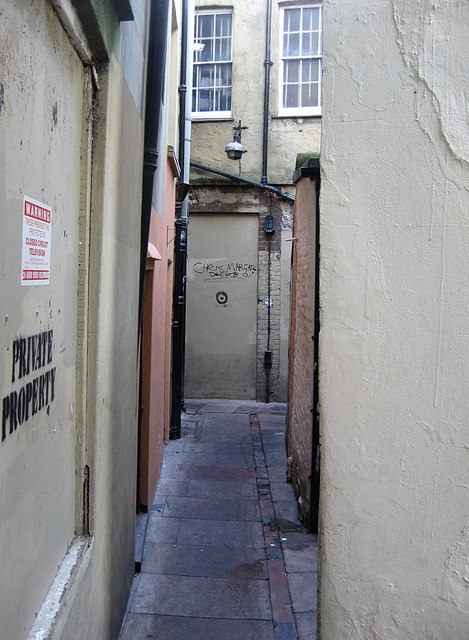

Quadrophenia Alley is located between number 10 and 11 East Street Brighton and was the location for a scene in the 1979 film Quadrophenia. The Alley has become a shrine to the Mod movement, and people come from all over the world to find this alleyway. The cult film was set in Brighton in 1964, the period of the Mods and Rockers.

In May 1964, masses of Mods and Rockers descended from London onto Brighton Beach, resulting in a mass fight that shocked the nation. It ended with people throwing bins, deckchairs, and stones. Several people were jailed after the incident; many were arrested and put in cells under Brighton Town Hall, now the Old Police Cells Museum.

This riot was the inspiration for Quadrophenia, starring Phil Daniels, Leslie Ash and Sting, depicting the clash, and much of it was filmed on location in the city. The narrow and easily overlooked Quadrophenia Alley was the setting of an escape from the police and a romantic encounter in the film.

Quadrophenia Alley, as it has become known, featured during a key scene in the film. People actually come from all over the world to find this alleyway, where two lovers escape the police and fall through a doorway into a yard.

The Alley is often covered in Mod-related graffiti and has become one of the most visited tourist attractions in the town.
