= Zoot Suit/I'm the Face =

"Zoot Suit"

Single by the High Numbers (The Who)
- B-side: "I'm the Face"
- Released: 3 July 1964
- Recorded: June 1964
- Studio: Fontana, London, England
- Genre: Mod
- Length: 1:59
- Label: Fontana
- Songwriter: Peter Meaden
- Producers: Chris Parmeinter; Peter Meaden

The High Numbers (The Who) singles chronology
"Zoot Suit" (1964)	"I Can't Explain" (1964)

"Zoot Suit" b/w "I'm the Face" was the first single by the English rock band the Who, who recorded it under the name the High Numbers in an attempt to appeal to a mod audience, as both songs embraced mod culture – a zoot suit being a fashionable item of clothing for mods, and a "Face" being mod slang for a well-respected member of mod society.

"Zoot Suit" was written by Peter Meaden, the band's first manager. The song is a direct copy of "Misery" by the American R&B group the Dynamics, while the B-side, "I'm the Face", is a copy of Slim Harpo's "I Got Love If You Want It". The single was meant for a mod audience, but failed to chart. The band changed their name back to The Who, found new management, and released their own composition "I Can't Explain", which became a top ten hit in the United Kingdom.

== Album/single appearances ==
"I'm the Face" appeared on Odds & Sods in 1974 (2:37 full-length version in stereo).

"I'm the Face" was again released as a B-side single to "Long Live Rock" along with a live version of "My Wife" for the UK single but was dropped on the U.S. single.

Both "Zoot Suit" and "I'm the Face" appeared on the soundtrack to the 1979 film based on the Who's 1973 album Quadrophenia (fade-out versions in mono, 1:59 and 2:32, respectively). The chorus of the song "Cut My Hair" from Quadrophenia contains a line quoting "Zoot Suit" ("Zoot suit, white jacket with side vents five inches long").

"Zoot Suit" b/w "I'm the Face" was reissued in 1980 and reached No. 49 in the UK.

"Zoot Suit" (short mono version) is the opening track from the compilation album The Who Hits 50! released in October 2014.

Both songs were featured on the Thirty Years of Maximum R&B box set (short remixed stereo versions).

"I'm the Face" appeared on Odds & Sods 1998 remix/remaster re-release (short remixed stereo version). It was released in 2015 in 24/96 high resolution as a HD track for download (Odds & Sods album on HD tracks, 2:37 full-length stereo version).

Both songs appeared on the Quadrophenia soundtrack 2000 remix/remaster re-release (short remixed stereo versions).

Both songs (short mono versions) were featured on the first (Fontana) 45 single in the Brunswick singles box set, subsequently released as the first two tracks (also the short mono versions) on the "Maximum A's & B's" CD box set (2017) comprising all the Fontana/Brunswick/Reaction/Track/Polydor singles.

Both songs were released on the Odds & Sods 2020 Record Store Day limited edition 2LP (both in full-length versions in stereo).
