= Quadrophenia (soundtrack) =

1979 soundtrack album by the Who

Quadrophenia (Music from the Soundtrack of The Who film)
- Soundtrack album art work for the Quadrophenia filmscore

Soundtrack album by the Who
- Released: September 1979
- Recorded: 1961–1979
- Genre: Hard rock; R&B
- Length: 74.12
- Label: Polydor

The Who chronology
The Kids Are Alright (1979)	Quadrophenia (Music from the Soundtrack of The Who film) (1979)	Face Dances (1981)

Singles from Quadrophenia
- 1. "5:15" Released: September 1979

Professional ratings
Review scores
Source	Rating
Christgau's Record Guide	B
The Encyclopedia of Popular Music	4/5 stars

Quadrophenia is the soundtrack album of the 1979 film Quadrophenia, which refers to the 1973 rock opera Quadrophenia. It was initially released on Polydor Records in 1979 as a cassette and LP and was re-released as a compact disc in 1993 and 2001. The album was dedicated to Peter Meaden, a prominent Mod and first manager of the Who, who had died a year prior to the album's release.

The album contains ten of the seventeen tracks from the original rock opera Quadrophenia. These are different mixes than those that appear on the 1973 album as they were remixed (including newly recorded Steinberger bass guitar parts) in 1979 by John Entwistle. The most notable difference is the track "The Real Me" (used for the title sequence of the film) which features a different and more prominent bass track, more prominent vocals and a more definite ending, which was part of the original recording but faded out on the previous mix. Most of the tracks are also edited to be slightly shorter. The soundtrack also includes three tracks by the Who that did not appear on the 1973 album – "Four Faces", "Get Out and Stay Out" and "Joker James". The latter two songs marked Kenney Jones's first on-record appearance with the Who after taking over on drums for the late Keith Moon. "Four Faces" was one of two outtakes recorded during the original 1973 sessions but unused at the time – The other being "We Close Tonight", which eventually was released on the remastered version of Odds & Sods.

== Track listing ==
All songs performed by the Who unless noted.

Side one

1. "I Am the Sea" – 2:03
2. "The Real Me" – 3:28
3. "I'm One" – 2:40
4. "5:15" – 4:50
5. "Love Reign O'er Me" – 5:11

Side two

1. "Bell Boy" – 4:55
2. "I've Had Enough" – 6:11
3. "Helpless Dancer" – 0:18
4. "Doctor Jimmy" – 7:26

Side three

1. "Zoot Suit" (The High Numbers) – 2:00
2. "Hi-Heel Sneakers" (Cross Section) – 2:46
3. "Get Out and Stay Out" – 2:26
4. "Four Faces" – 3:20
5. "Joker James" – 3:13
6. "The Punk and the Godfather" – 5:21

Side four

1. "Night Train" (James Brown) – 3:38
2. "Louie Louie" (The Kingsmen) – 2:41
3. "Green Onions" (Booker T. & the M.G.'s) – 2:46
4. "Rhythm of the Rain" (The Cascades) – 2:28
5. "He's So Fine" (The Chiffons) – 1:52
6. "Be My Baby" (The Ronettes) – 2:30
7. "Da Doo Ron Ron" (The Crystals) – 2:09

=== 1993 CD reissue ===
A version of the album was released on CD in 1993 (as Songs from Quadrophenia) featuring only the tracks performed by the High Numbers and the Who. The album keeps the Who tracks in the same order as the original double album and begins with the two High Numbers tracks. (Note: Prior to deciding on the name the Who they were called the High Numbers for a short period in summer 1964.)

1. "I'm the Face" (The High Numbers) – 2:31
2. "Zoot Suit" (The High Numbers) – 2:00
3. "I Am the Sea" – 2:03
4. "The Real Me" – 3:30
5. "I'm One" – 2:40
6. "5:15" – 4:51
7. "Love Reign O'er Me" – 5:11
8. "Bell Boy" – 4:57
9. "I've Had Enough" – 6:12
10. "Helpless Dancer" – 0:23
11. "Doctor Jimmy" – 7:32
12. "Get Out and Stay Out" – 2:28
13. "Four Faces" – 3:21
14. "Joker James" – 3:14
15. "The Punk and the Godfather" – 5:28

=== 2000 CD reissue ===
A version of the album was released on CD in 2000 (as Music from the Soundtrack of the Who Film Quadrophenia) restoring the track listing to its original configuration, and adding "I'm the Face" to the running order.

1. "I Am the Sea" – 2:03
2. "The Real Me" – 3:28
3. "I'm One" – 2:40
4. "5:15" – 4:50
5. "Love Reign O'er Me" – 5:11
6. "Bell Boy" – 4:55
7. "I've Had Enough" – 6:11
8. "Helpless Dancer" – 0:22
9. "Doctor Jimmy" – 7:31
10. "Zoot Suit" (The High Numbers) – 2:00
11. "Hi-Heel Sneakers" (Cross Section) – 2:46
12. "Get Out and Stay Out" – 2:26
13. "Four Faces" – 3:20
14. "Joker James" – 3:13
15. "The Punk and the Godfather" – 5:21
16. "Night Train" (James Brown) – 3:38
17. "Louie Louie" (The Kingsmen) – 2:41
18. "Green Onions" (Booker T. & the M.G.'s) – 2:46
19. "Rhythm of the Rain" (The Cascades) – 2:28
20. "He's So Fine" (The Chiffons) – 1:52
21. "Be My Baby" (The Ronettes) – 2:30
22. "Da Doo Ron Ron" (The Crystals) – 2:09
23. "I'm the Face" (The High Numbers) – 2:29

== Personnel ==
- Roger Daltrey – lead vocals
- Pete Townshend – guitar, keyboards, synthesizers, lead and backing vocals
- John Entwistle – bass, brass overdubs, backing vocals
- Keith Moon – drums, co-lead vocals on "Bell Boy"
- Kenney Jones – drums on "Get Out and Stay Out" and "Joker James"

Production

- John Entwistle – Musical Director
- Mike Shaw – Music Co-ordinator
- Dave "Cyrano" Langston – Recording and Remix Engineer
- Remastered (2018) by Jon Astley

Design

- Sleeve design by Richard Evans
- Photography by Frank Connor
- Co-ordination by Chris Chappel

== Charts ==
Chart performance for Quadrophenia
Chart (1979)	Peak position
UK Albums (OCC)	23
US Billboard Pop Albums	46
