= The Dynamics =

American R&B group

The Dynamics were an American R&B group from Detroit, Michigan.

The Dynamics were formed in the early 1960s. Their first hit was 1963's "Misery", which formed the basis for the Who's first record, "Zoot Suit".

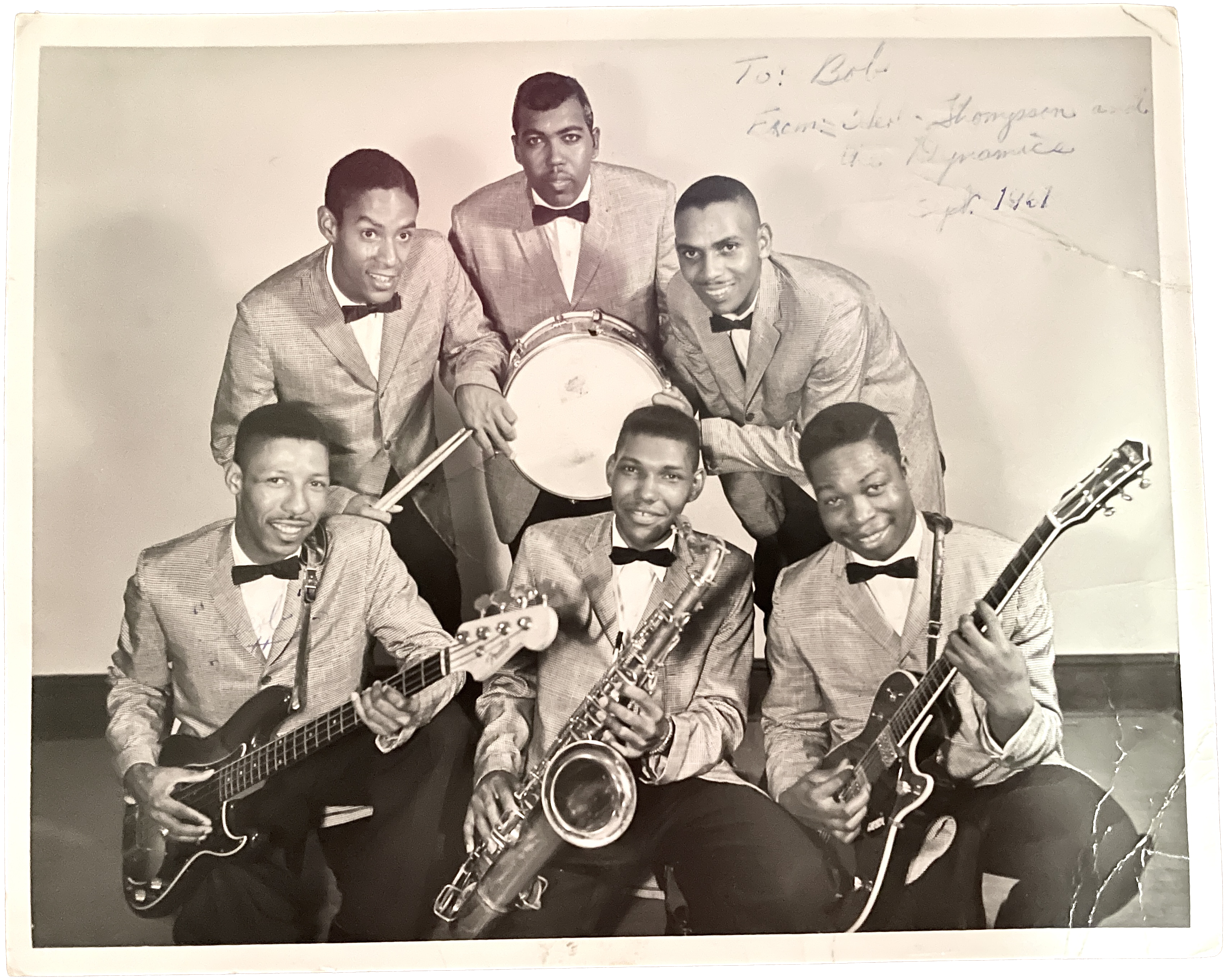
The Dynamics

In the late 1960s the group was managed by Ted White, who married Aretha Franklin. The group released two full-length albums and charted three hits on the U.S. R&B charts in 1973–74.

Their first album was recorded in Memphis and featured a number of Memphis session musicians – Reggie Young on guitar, Bobby Emmons on organ, Bobby Wood on piano, Mike Leech on bass, and Gene Chrisman on drums.

== Members ==
- Isiah "Zeke" Harris (Deceased)
- George White
- Fred Baker
- Samuel Stevenson
- Zerben R. Hicks

The Dynamics are still going strong with Carnell "Silver" Butler and Fred Williams.

== Discography ==
- First Landing (Cotillion Records, 1969)
- What a Shame (Black Gold Records, 1973) U.S. R&B Albums #52
- Last Landing (HackTone Records, 1975) - reissue

== Charting singles ==
- "Misery" (1963) Billboard Hot 100 #44
- "Ice Cream Song" (1969) Billboard Hot 100 #59; Canada - RPM #48
- "Funkey Key" (1973) R&B #49
- "What a Shame" (1973) R&B #40
- "She's for Real (Bless You)" R&B #92
