= 5:15 =

1973 single by The Who

- German single sleeve

Single by the Who

from the album Quadrophenia
- B-side: "Water"
- Released: 5 October 1973
- Recorded: 27 June 1973
- Genre: Rock; glam rock
- Length: 5:00 (album version); 4:48 (single mix)
- Label: Track (UK); MCA (US)
- Songwriter: Pete Townshend
- Producer: The Who

The Who singles chronology
"Relay" (1972)	"5:15" (1973)	"Love, Reign o'er Me" (1973)

Official audio
- "5:15" on YouTube

"5:15" (sometimes written "5.15" or "5'15") is a song written by Pete Townshend of the English rock band the Who. Part of the band's second rock opera, Quadrophenia (1973), the song was also released as a single and reached No. 20 on the UK singles chart, while the 1979 re-release (accompanying the film and soundtrack album) reached No. 45 on the Billboard Hot 100.

Although written as "5.15" on the single covers in some countries, on the back cover of Quadrophenia (the album from which the song is taken) it is written as "5:15", and some single covers render it that way.

== Background ==
The lyrics of "5:15" describe Quadrophenia's protagonist, Jimmy, travelling to Brighton on a train. The song's writer, Pete Townshend, said of the song's lyrics:

His train journey down to Brighton, sandwiched between two city gents is notable for the rather absurd number of purple hearts he consumes in order to while away the time. He goes through a not entirely pleasant series of ups and downs as he thinks about the gaudier side of life as a teenager that we see in newspapers like the News of the World. '5:15' was written in Oxford Street and Carnaby Street while I was killing time between appointments. I must try it again sometime, it seems to work!

— Pete Townshend

No demo recording of the song exists, as the track was written in the studio on the day the song was recorded. The whistle heard on the track was recorded after Townshend's driver bribed a British train driver with five pounds to sound the train's whistle as it pulled out, despite breaking the station rules.

"5:15" was released as a single in Britain and Europe shortly before the release of Quadrophenia in October 1973. Backed with the Lifehouse outtake "Water", the single charted at No. 20 in Britain and No. 46 in Germany. The single was not released in America, where "Love, Reign o'er Me" and "The Real Me" were chosen as singles instead. Roger Daltrey later commented on the song's single release, "Really, it was the only single on Quadrophenia we could have released." The 7-inch vinyl single mix differs from the wider soundscape of the album mix and appears as a narrower closed stereo; however, the overall dynamics are just as powerful. This particular mix is not available on CD. All compilations making claim to the single mix have used the album mix version and cut to a variety of different running time lengths plus or minus a few seconds. "Water", the B-side, is a track recorded during the April–May 1970 sessions at I.B.C. and Eel Pie Studios, and was originally intended for an EP, later made available on the deluxe reissue of Odds & Sods.

== Lyrics ==
In the song, the narrator, Jimmy, who has taken the 5:15 train to Brighton and consumed a lot of drugs, recollects in a stream of consciousness his life with the Mods, the cultural movement to which he belongs (even if he has dropped out for now), and their duels with the Rockers. Jimmy's memories are extremely disjointed, consisting mainly of anger, confusion, violence, sexual frustration, and rootlessness.

"5:15", like many of the songs from Quadrophenia, is self-referential – "M-m-m-my generation" is a line, repeated from the band's earlier single – and thus represents an angrily self-centred, teenage disconnection from society, family and the opposite sex. Jimmy was "born in the war" (that is, at the time of World War II and its aftermath) and does not understand why he should care about it (or anything) in the context of his extravagant Mod values.

== Soundtrack version ==
"5:15"
- US single sleeve

Single by The Who

from the album Quadrophenia (soundtrack)
- B-side: "I'm One"
- Released: September 1979
- Songwriter: Pete Townshend
- Producer: The Who

The Who singles chronology
"Long Live Rock" (1979)	"5:15" (1979)	"You Better You Bet" (1981)

In 1979, "5:15" and nine other tracks from Quadrophenia were remixed by John Entwistle for the soundtrack of the film adaptation of the original rock opera. This version of "5:15" was released as a single in September 1979 to promote the album, reaching No. 45 on the Billboard Hot 100 in America. Record World said of this version that "All the thunderous fury that so often dominates The Who's music is everpresent."

== Live performances ==
Live performances of "5:15" sometimes included, in addition to the Who's four members, a full brass section and a piano. During the Who reunion tour from 1999 to 2002, bassist John Entwistle played a solo in mid-song, lasting several minutes, only accompanied by drummer Zak Starkey. During the Who's 2012 Quadrophenia tour, long after Entwistle's death in 2002, his bass solo was featured by showing footage from a 2000 performance at the Royal Albert Hall while Starkey played live.

== Personnel ==
The Who

- Roger Daltrey – lead vocals
- Pete Townshend – guitar, backing and lead vocals
- John Entwistle – bass guitar, trumpet, backing vocals
- Keith Moon – drums

Featuring

- Chris Stainton – piano

== See also ==
- "On the 5:15"
