= Richard Evans (designer) =

English album cover designer

- Born: 30 March 1945 (age 81); Wilmslow, Cheshire, England
- Occupations: Graphic designer; art director; illustrator
- Years active: 1968–present

Richard Evans (born 30 March 1945) is a graphic designer, art director and illustrator. He studied fashion and textile design at Nottingham School of Art and graphic design and illustration at Leicester College of Art.

On leaving art school in 1968, he began what was to be a brief career as a fashion illustrator, mainly for teen magazines Petticoat and Honey, published by Fleetway Publications. In 1971 he formed fashion footwear company Daisy Roots Shoes with a showroom in Beauchamp Place, Knightsbridge, London and a retail shop in Harrods Way In boutique, designing and producing high fashion footwear for the hip rock generation featuring stacked heel and platform shoes and boots in brightly coloured leathers and exotic reptile skins. His footwear was favoured by the likes of Elton John, George Harrison, The Osmonds, Roxy Music, Redbone and Rory Gallagher.

He worked as a graphic designer and illustrator in the mid- to late-1970s at design studio Hipgnosis with Storm Thorgerson and Aubrey Powell, designers of many classic rock album covers for Pink Floyd, Paul McCartney and Wings, Led Zeppelin, Peter Gabriel, Bad Company, 10cc, Genesis, Black Sabbath and many others. It was at Hipgnosis that Evans honed his skills as an album cover designer.

Evans has produced album covers and designs for many artistes including The Doors, Public Image Limited, Pete Townshend, Nik Kershaw, Robert Plant, Alison Krauss, Black Sabbath, Judas Priest, Pink Floyd, Paul McCartney, The Kinks, Godley & Creme, Agnetha Fältskog, Deep Purple, Roger Daltrey, Bad Company, World Party, Emerson Lake & Palmer, Jeff Wayne, Scorpions, King Sunny Adé, Al Stewart, Bill Wyman, Louis Armstrong and Van Morrison, plus designs for a diverse range of musical genres.

He is mostly known for his design work for The Who, with whom he has worked since 1976, including album covers for The Kids Are Alright (1979), Quadrophenia (1979), Hooligans (1981), Who's Missing (1985), Two's Missing (1987), Who's Better, Who's Best (1988), Join Together (1990), Thirty Years of Maximum R&B (1994), My Generation: The Very Best of the Who (1996), Blues to the Bush (2000), The Ultimate Collection (2002), Live at the Royal Albert Hall (2003), The 1st Singles Box (2004), Wire & Glass (2006), Endless Wire (2006), View from a Backstage Pass (2007), Amazing Journey: The Story of The Who (soundtrack) (2008), Live at Hull 1970 (2012), The Who's 50th anniversary tour logo and album The Who Hits 50! (2015), The Brunswick Singles 1965-1966 (2015), The Reaction Singles 1966 (2015), The Track Singles 1967-1973 (2015), The Polydor Singles 1975-2015 (2016), Live at the Isle of Wight Festival 1970 (2017), Maximum As & Bs (2017), Live at the Fillmore East 1968 (2018), The Who's Tommy Orchestral (2019) by Roger Daltrey, The Who With Orchestra Live at Wembley (2023). and Live at the Oval 1971 (2025).

He has designed super deluxe edition box sets of Quadrophenia Director's Cut (2011), Tommy (2013), My Generation (2016), The Who Sell Out (2021), Who's Next / Lifehouse (2023) and Who Are You (2025). His design for The Who Sell Out Super Deluxe Edition box set won the Best CD Deluxe Set in the Making Vinyl Packaging Awards (2021).

Evans is the author of The Art of the Album Cover, published by Chartwell Books/ Compendium
