= Be Lucky =

2014 single by The Who

Single by the Who

from the album The Who Hits 50!
- Released: 25 September 2014
- Recorded: Summer 2014
- Studio: British Grove Studios (London); Yellow Fish Studios (Brighton)
- Length: 3:16
- Songwriter(s): Pete Townshend
- Producer(s): Dave Eringa

The Who singles chronology
"It's Not Enough" (2006)	"Be Lucky" (2014)	"Ball and Chain" (2019)

"Be Lucky" is a song by the English rock band the Who, written by Pete Townshend and recorded for the band's compilation album The Who Hits 50! released in 2014 and was proposed for a following album. The song was the first new material released by the Who in the eight years since their 2006 studio album Endless Wire. The royalties from "Be Lucky" benefited Teen Cancer America, a US outgrowth of Roger Daltrey's successful UK charity, the Teenage Cancer Trust.

== Personnel ==
The Who

- Roger Daltrey – lead vocals; backing vocals
- Pete Townshend – guitars; backing vocals

Additional musicians

- Billy Nicholls – backing vocals
- Pino Palladino – bass guitar
- Zak Starkey – drums
- Mick Talbot – keyboards
- Simon Townshend – backing vocals

== Production ==
- Richard Evans – cover design
