= Live at the Fillmore East 1968 =

Live album by the Who
- Released: 20 April 2018
- Recorded: April 6, 1968
- Venue: Fillmore East
- Genre: Rock; hard rock
- Length: 93:04
- Label: Polydor

The Who chronology
Maximum As & Bs (2017)	Live at the Fillmore East 1968 (2018)	Who (2019)

Live at the Fillmore East 1968 is a live album by the English rock band the Who. It was recorded at the Fillmore East, New York City on Saturday 6 April 1968 and released on 20 April 2018 as a double album on CD, and a triple album on LP.

The band had originally been booked to play four shows over two nights, April 5–6, but fears of social unrest over the recent assassination of Dr. Martin Luther King a few days earlier led to the decision to play just one show per night. Both shows were recorded by manager Kit Lambert for a potential live album, although technical issues led to most of the first show being unusable. Tapes from both the shows were cut to acetate and nearly released, but the project was ultimately canceled; boots of the acetate appeared a few years later, leading to clamor for a belated official release.

The eventual release contains all the songs played at the April 6 show with the exception of openers "Substitute" and "Pictures of Lily", as only fragments had been captured. A 33-minute version of "My Generation" was brand-new, not having been heard on versions of the show taken from the original acetate. Another difference from the boot copy was the performance of "A Quick One", which on the acetate had stemmed from the show on April 5 and contained an oblique reference to the assassination of MLK at its close. Most of the original between-song dialogue was preserved, including Townshend humorously cussing out the original Village Theater and praising its new name and ownership.

Professional ratings
Review scores
Source	Rating
AllMusic	4.5/5 stars

== Track listing ==
All songs written by Pete Townshend except where noted.

Disc one

1. "Summertime Blues" (Eddie Cochran, Jerry Capehart) – 4:15
2. "Fortune Teller" (Naomi Neville) – 2:38
3. "Tattoo" – 2:58
4. "Little Billy" – 3:38
5. "I Can't Explain" – 2:28
6. "Happy Jack" – 2:18
7. "Relax" – 11:57
8. "I'm a Boy" – 3:23
9. "A Quick One, While He's Away" – 11:15
10. "My Way" (Cochran, Capehart) – 3:16
11. "C'mon Everybody" (Cochran, Capehart) – 1:55
12. "Shakin' All Over" (Johnny Kidd, Guy Robinson) – 6:55
13. "Boris the Spider" (John Entwistle) – 2:34

Disc two

1. "My Generation" – 33:05

== Personnel ==
=== The Who ===
- Roger Daltrey – lead vocals
- Pete Townshend – guitars, backing vocals
- John Entwistle – bass guitar, backing vocals
- Keith Moon – drums

=== Additional personnel ===
- Kit Lambert – Recording and producer
- Bob Pridden and Richard Whittaker – Restoration and mixing
- Jon Astley – Mastering
- Richard Evans – Design & art direction
- Linda McCartney – Photographs of the Who at the Fillmore East
- Andy Neill – Essay
