= Postcard (The Who song) =

Single by the Who

from the album Odds & Sods
- B-side: "Put the Money Down" (US) "I'm the Face" (France)
- Released: 23 November 1974
- Recorded: At Eel Pie Studios (also known as Pete Townshend's garage in Twickenham) late May 1970 with additional horns produced and played by John Entwistle and recorded at Ramport Studios, London 1974.
- Genre: Rock
- Length: 3:31
- Label: Track/MCA
- Songwriter: John Entwistle
- Producer: The Who

The Who singles chronology
"The Real Me" (1974)	"Postcard" (1974)	"Squeeze Box" (1975)

"Postcard" is a song by the English rock band the Who, that was written, and sung by the band's bassist John Entwistle. It appears on the Who's album Odds & Sods (1974).

Released as a single, in the United States, it reached the Cash Box charts on 23 November 1974, peaking at No. 64. It was the first song written by Entwistle that was released as the A-side of a Who single.

== Background and history ==
John Entwistle said about the album:

We thought we'd just have a go at some of these bootlegs. They release really bad bootlegs of these songs all the time. I've heard three of them which were made in the States and they're really bad quality. They obviously will last only about three plays before the acetate disintegrates. We thought it was about time we released a bootleg of our own. I tried to arrange it like a parallel sort of Who career -- what singles we might have released and what album tracks we might have released.

Pete Townshend said about the song:

'Postcard' is a John Entwistle song about touring on the road. He describes in luscious detail the joys and delights of such romantic venues as Australia (pause to fight off temporary attack of nausea), America (pause to count the money) and, of course, that country of the mysterious and doubting customs official, Germany (pause, whether they like it or not, for 'God Save The Queen'). Listen out for the field sound effects ACTUALLY RECORDED IN THE COUNTRIES WE TOURED. 'Postcard' was originally recorded in my house for a maxi single. They were EPs that only cost as much as a single. Ours unfortunately never got released.

I engineered this one with one hand on the controls and the other on the guitar. That's why I only play one chord throughout the whole song.

The Who FAQ author Mike Segretto describes it as "a fun travelogue of the Who's roadwork, penned with the droll wit we've come to expect from John Entwistle." The lyrics tell the various countries the band had visited on tour. Chris Charlesworth describes the song as having an "up tempo rock rhythm". Billboard described it as a "commercially oriented cut" with a "good, fun storyline". Cash Box said that "the disk goes back to 1971 but the Kings of English rock are as relevant on this disk as if it were cut last week." Record World said that this "melodic rocker is now stamped for '75 glory."

"Postcard" was originally recorded for potential release on a maxi single in 1970, but that version only ended up being released in Japan. For the version released on Odds & Sods, Entwistle remixed the song and recorded a new bass guitar part.
