= Odds & Sods =

Compilation album by the Who
- Released: 4 October 1974
- Recorded: 1964–1973
- Genre: Rock
- Length: 40:23
- Label: Track (UK); Track/MCA (US)
- Producer: Glyn Johns, Kit Lambert, Peter Meaden, Chris Parmenter, Shel Talmy, The Who
- Compiler: John Alcock, John Entwistle

The Who chronology
Quadrophenia (1973)	Odds & Sods (1974)	Tommy (1975)

Singles from Odds & Sods
- 1. "Postcard" Released: November 1974

Professional ratings
Review scores
Source	Rating
AllMusic	3.5/5 stars
Christgau's Record Guide	B
The Encyclopedia of Popular Music	4/5 stars
MusicHound	3.5/5
Pitchfork	10/10
Rolling Stone	(satisfactory)
The Rolling Stone Album Guide	3/5 stars
Tom Hull	B

Odds & Sods is an album of studio outtakes by the English rock band the Who. It was released by Track Records in the UK on 28 September 1974, and by Track/MCA in the US on 12 October 1974. Ten of the recordings on the original eleven-song album were previously unreleased. The album reached No. 10 on the UK charts and No. 15 in the US.

The recordings were compiled by Who bassist John Entwistle. Two LPs of songs were considered in 1974, but only one LP was released at the time. "It could have been a double album, there was that much material", Entwistle said. It was one of the first examples of artists compiling such unreleased recordings. The Who, as well as many other artists, later released similar albums, such as Who's Missing.

== Background ==
In the autumn of 1973, while Roger Daltrey, Pete Townshend and Keith Moon were preparing for the Tommy film, Entwistle was put in charge of completing an album to counter the rampant bootlegging that arose from the Who's concerts. "If John Entwistle had never seen Who's Zoo", observed that bootleg's cover artist William Stout, "we might not have had the legitimate Who release of Odds & Sods".

"I tried to arrange it like a parallel sort of Who career – what singles we might have released and what album tracks we might have released", Entwistle explained. He and the producer of his solo albums, John Alcock, compiled Odds & Sods from various unreleased Who tapes.

Townshend wrote liner notes in 1974 that included frank opinions of the quality of the songs. The notes were omitted from some copies of the original LP but included on the 1998 remastered CD. The latter featured material from the unreleased second LP.

== Songs ==
"Postcard", the only song on the original album written by Entwistle, was also released as a single. This track had new overdubs and a remix for the 1974 release. This track as well as "Now I'm a Farmer" and "Naked Eye" had been planned for an EP release in 1970, which was cancelled.

"Put the Money Down", "Too Much of Anything" and "Pure and Easy" were from the aborted Lifehouse project which the band worked on during 1971 and 1972.

"Little Billy" was written in 1968 by Townshend for the American Cancer Society, but it never saw the light of day because it never left the office of the executive Townshend submitted it to. "Glow Girl" and "Faith in Something Bigger" were also recorded in 1968 for an unfinished studio album.

"I'm the Face" (which is a reworking of the Slim Harpo classic "Got Love If You Want It") was the Who's first record, when they were still performing as the High Numbers. It was recorded and first released in 1964. Only a few hundred copies of the original single were pressed. The song was remixed in stereo for the 1974 album.

"Long Live Rock" comes from a 1972 Who recording session. This track was later featured in the Who film "The Kids Are Alright", and released as a single in 1979.

=== Additional material ===
The mix of "Under My Thumb" on the 1998 remastered CD is a special stereo remix produced but not used for the Thirty Years of Maximum R&B box set that omits the original fuzzbox guitar part.

The studio version of "Young Man Blues" on the re-issue is not the sampler version of The House that Track Built, but a slower out-take (seemingly due to the tape playing at the wrong speed) from the same sessions as the Sampler Version, which was finally released in an alternate mix on the 2013 deluxe version of Tommy. The iTunes American Store lists this version of "Young Man Blues" as an "Alternate Studio Version" and at the end Kit Lambert is heard to remark: "No, that one didn't really work".

The 2011 reissue featuring the original analog mixes has some different takes than the 1998 version. For example, "Young Man Blues" is a different take than the 1998 remix.

== Release history ==
On 29 August 2020, the album was re-released as a limited edition coloured double vinyl LP. The first disc consists of the 1974 release. The second consists of various tracks, many of which were included in the expanded 1998 CD reissue, some of which were included on other releases, and others available for the first time on the 2020 release.

== Track listing ==
All songs written by Pete Townshend except where noted.

=== Original album ===
Side one
No.	Title	Writer(s)	Recording date and location	Length
1.	"Postcard"	John Entwistle	August 14, 1973; Eel Pie Studios	3:27
2.	"Now I'm a Farmer"		August 16, 1973; Eel Pie Studios	3:59
3.	"Put the Money Down"		June 6, 1972; Olympic Studios	4:14
4.	"Little Billy"		February 11, 1968; IBC Studios	2:15
5.	"Too Much of Anything"		during May 1971; Olympic Studios	4:26
6.	"Glow Girl"		January 1968; De Lane Lea Studios	2:20
Total length:				20:41

Side two
No.	Title	Writer(s)	Recording date and location	Length
1.	"Pure and Easy"		March 1971; Stargroves	5:23
2.	"Faith in Something Bigger"		January 4, 1968; CBS Studios	3:03
3.	"I'm the Face" (The High Numbers)	Peter Meaden	June 1964; Fontana Studios, London	2:32
4.	"Naked Eye"		August 16, 1973; Eel Pie	5:10
5.	"Long Live Rock"		June 5, 1972; Olympic Studios	3:54
Total length:				20:02

=== 1998 remaster ===
No.	Title	Writer(s)	Length
1.	"I'm the Face" (The High Numbers)	Peter Meaden	2:32
2.	"Leaving Here"	Brian Holland, Lamont Dozier, Eddie Holland	2:12
3.	"Baby Don't You Do It"	Holland, Dozier, Holland	2:27
4.	"Summertime Blues" (studio version)	Eddie Cochran, Jerry Capehart	3:13
5.	"Under My Thumb"	Mick Jagger, Keith Richards	2:44
6.	"Mary Anne with the Shaky Hand"		3:21
7.	"My Way"	Cochran, Capehart	2:26
8.	"Faith in Something Bigger"		3:03
9.	"Glow Girl"		2:24
10.	"Little Billy"		2:17
11.	"Young Man Blues" (alternate version)	Mose Allison	2:44
12.	"Cousin Kevin Model Child"	John Entwistle	1:24
13.	"Love Ain't for Keeping" (Pete Townshend on lead vocals)		4:03
14.	"Time Is Passing" (Mono mix created from the left channel of the original stereo mix)		3:29
15.	"Pure and Easy"		5:21
16.	"Too Much of Anything"		4:21
17.	"Long Live Rock"		3:56
18.	"Put the Money Down"		4:29
19.	"We Close Tonight"		2:56
20.	"Postcard"	Entwistle	3:30
21.	"Now I'm a Farmer"		4:06
22.	"Water"		4:39
23.	"Naked Eye"		5:26
Total length:			77:03

=== CD Reissue 2011 (SHM-CD) ===
In December 2011, Universal Japan issued the original analogue mix for the album on CD with the songs reflecting the order of the original vinyl. The bonus tracks that were issued previously on the 1998 CD remix reissue were added after the original running order of the album. These bonus tracks used the original analogue mixes where possible rather than the remixes prepared for the 1998 expanded CD reissue. The reissue was remastered by Jon Astley.

No.	Title	Length
1.	"Postcard"	3:35
2.	"Now I'm a Farmer"	4:11
3.	"Put the Money Down"	4:04
4.	"Little Billy"	2:15
5.	"Too Much of Anything"	4:24
6.	"Glow Girl"	2:15
7.	"Pure and Easy"	5:25
8.	"Faith in Something Bigger"	3:07
9.	"I'm the Face"	2:31
10.	"Naked Eye"	5:16
11.	"Long Live Rock"	3:56
12.	"Leaving Here"	2:15
13.	"Baby Don't You Do It"	2:30
14.	"Summertime Blues" (studio version)	3:16
15.	"Under My Thumb"	2:47
16.	"Mary Anne with the Shaky Hand"	2:10
17.	"My Way"	2:27
18.	"Young Man Blues"	2:45
19.	"Cousin Kevin Model Child"	1:25
20.	"Love Ain't for Keeping"	4:07
21.	"Time Is Passing"	3:30
22.	"We Close Tonight"	2:55
23.	"Water"	4:42
Total length:		75:48

=== 2020 RSD edition ===
Side one
No.	Title	Writer(s)	Year of Recording	Length
1.	"Postcard"	John Entwistle	1970, 1974	3:35
2.	"Now I'm a Farmer"		1970	4:11
3.	"Put the Money Down"		1972, 1974	4:05
4.	"Little Billy"		1968	2:15
5.	"Too Much of Anything"		1971, 1972	4:26
6.	"Glow Girl"		1968	2:13

Side two
No.	Title	Writer(s)	Year of Recording	Length
1.	"Pure and Easy"		1971	5:25
2.	"Faith in Something Bigger"		1968	3:08
3.	"I'm the Face" (The High Numbers)	Peter Meaden	1964	2:37
4.	"Naked Eye"		1970	5:19
5.	"Long Live Rock"		1972	4:00

Side three
No.	Title	Writer(s)	Place of Origin	Length
1.	"Zoot Suit" (The High Numbers)	Peter Meaden	Non-album single, 1964	2:08
2.	"Here 'Tis" (The High Numbers, recorded in 1964)	Ellas McDaniel	Thirty Years of Maximum R&B, 1994	2:11
3.	"Leaving Here" (acetate version, recorded in 1965)	Holland–Dozier–Holland	Odds & Sods (1998 remaster), 1998	2:13
4.	"Baby Don't You Do It" (acetate version, recorded in 1965)	Holland–Dozier–Holland	Odds & Sods (1998 remaster), 1998	2:29
5.	"Young Man Blues" (studio version)	Mose Allison	The House That Track Built, 1969	2:47
6.	"Dogs Part Two"	Keith Moon	Non-album B-side, 1969	2:28
7.	"Here For More"	Roger Daltrey	Non-album B-side, 1970	2:27
8.	"The Seeker" (full length version, recorded in 1970)		Previously unreleased, 2020	4:02

Side four
No.	Title	Writer(s)	Place of Origin	Length
1.	"Heaven and Hell"	John Entwistle	Non-album B-side, 1970	3:34
2.	"I Don't Even Know Myself" (original EP version, recorded in 1970)		Then and Now (Japanese release), 2004	4:09
3.	"When I Was A Boy"	John Entwistle	Non-album B-side, 1971	3:31
4.	"Waspman"	Keith Moon	Non-album B-side, 1972	3:06
5.	"We Close Tonight" (recorded in 1973)		Odds & Sods (1998 remaster), 1998	3:03
6.	"Water" (recorded in 1970)		Non-album B-side, 1973	4:42

== Personnel ==
The Who

- Roger Daltrey – lead vocals, backing vocals, harmonica
- Pete Townshend – guitar, piano, synthesiser, backing and lead vocals
- John Entwistle – bass, brass, backing and lead vocals
- Keith Moon – drums, occasional vocals

Production

- John Entwistle – album compilation
- John Alcock – album compilation
- Peter Meaden – production
- Chris Parmenter – production
- Kit Lambert – production
- Glyn Johns – associate production
- Roger Daltrey – sleeve concept
- Graham Hughes – album cover design, photography, design concept
- Pete Townshend – liner notes
- Jon Astley – 1998 reissue producer
- Chris Charlesworth – executive producer, 1998 reissue
- Bill Curbishley – executive producer, 1998 reissue
- Robert Rosenberg – executive producer, 1998 reissue
- Richard Evans – design & art direction, 1998 reissue and 2020 RSD edition
- Andy MacPherson – mixing, 1998 reissue

== Charts ==
Chart (1974)	Peak position
Australian Albums (Kent Music Report)	47
UK Albums (OCC)	10
US Billboard 200	15

== Certifications ==
Region	Certification	Certified units/sales
United Kingdom (BPI)	Gold	100,000^{^}
United States (RIAA)	Gold	500,000^{^}
^{^} Shipments figures based on certification alone.
