= Won't Get Fooled Again (EP) =

EP by the Who
- Released: August 1988
- Recorded: 1967–1979
- Genre: Rock
- Length: 18:29
- Label: Polydor
- Producer: Various

The Who chronology
Who's Better, Who's Best (1988)	Won't Get Fooled Again (1988)	Join Together (1990)

The Who EP chronology
Ready Steady Who (1966)	Won't Get Fooled Again (1988)	Wire & Glass (2006)

Won't Get Fooled Again is an extended play of songs by the English rock band the Who, released in August 1988 by Polydor Records. This EP was only released in the United Kingdom.

== Track listing ==
No.	Title	Writer(s)	Length
1.	"Won't Get Fooled Again: Produced by The Who; Associate producer: Glyn Johns; Recorded at the Rolling Stones Mobile Studio and Olympic Studios, 1971"	Pete Townshend	8:32
2.	"Bony Moronie: Produced by John Williams; Recorded at the Rolling Stones Mobile Studio live at the Young Vic, 1971"	Larry Williams	3:34
3.	"Dancing in the Street: Recorded live in Philadelphia, 1979"	William Stevenson, Marvin Gaye	3:54
4.	"Mary Anne with the Shaky Hand: Produced by Kit Lambert; Recorded at the Talent Masters Studio, 1967"	Townshend	2:29
Total length:			18:29
