= The Real Me (song) =

Original song written and composed by Peter Townshend

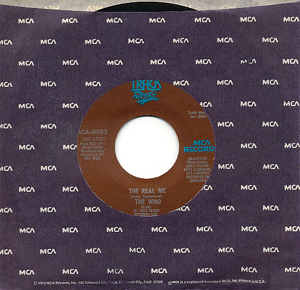

Single by the Who

from the album Quadrophenia
- B-side: "I'm One" (US/Canada) "Doctor Jimmy" (France/Belgium)
- Released: 12 January 1974
- Recorded: May 1972
- Genre: Hard rock; arena rock
- Length: 3:20 (album version); 3:30 (Quadrophenia soundtrack version/single version)
- Label: Track/MCA
- Songwriter: Pete Townshend
- Producer: The Who

The Who singles chronology
"Love, Reign o'er Me" (1973)	"The Real Me" (1974)	"Postcard" (1974)

"The Real Me" is a song written by Pete Townshend on the Who's second full-scale rock opera, Quadrophenia in 1973. This is the second track on the album, although it is the first with lyrics. It concerns a boy named Jimmy, a young English Mod with four distinct personalities. The song describes how he angrily deals with several individuals to identify "the real me". The song was released as a single (backed with "I'm One") in the United States and Canada in 1974.

The song is known for its virtuosic bass performance by John Entwistle. According to a 1996 interview with Entwistle by Goldmine Magazine, the bass part was recorded on the first take. Entwistle claimed he was "joking around" when he played the part, but the band loved it and used it in the final version.

Aside from the verses about the psychiatrist, mother and preacher, Townshend's original demo of the song on his solo album Scoop 3 includes another verse about rock and roll in general. The arrangement of the song is also much slower than what it would end up as in Quadrophenia.

Townshend has always referred to it as "Can You See the Real Me", rather than the more accepted abbreviated title.

Record World said that "this tune exhibits the form that makes the group the premier British rockers" and praised the "fine rhythm work from bassist Entwistle and drummer Moon."

== Live history ==
The band first performed "The Real Me" on their 1973 tour promoting the Quadrophenia album, as a medley with the tape track "I Am the Sea", and it was played up until the end of their next French tour the following year, this time without "I Am the Sea". For that purpose, it was released as a single (backed with "Doctor Jimmy") in France and Belgium in 1974. It was not played again until the 1979 tour, where it frequently used to close concerts. It remained a fixture of the Who's concerts until 1981, and was again played on their 1989 reunion tour. It was included in every concert of the 1996–1997 tour, on which Quadrophenia was played in its entirety. The Who continued to play the song until John Entwistle's death in 2002. After not performing it for several years, the band began including it in their live shows again in 2007 with the bass part, now performed by Pino Palladino, being less prominent than in the original version. It was featured in every performance on the 2012–2013 "Quadrophenia and More" tour, which again featured the entire album, and was performed on the 2019 “Moving On!” tour, where the core band was augmented by a 40-piece orchestra.

The band have been known to stretch the song out with an extended instrumental jam. A notable example occurred at the Rainbow Theatre in London on 3 February 1981, when the song reached 12 minutes. These extended jams have become far less frequent since Entwistle's death.

== Other album appearances ==
"The Real Me" was featured in the 1979 movie based on Quadrophenia as well as its soundtrack album, with a new bass track and a conclusive ending as opposed to the segue on the original album. It was also featured on the 2002 Who compilation The Ultimate Collection, with a slightly modified opening.

The following Who albums and DVDs feature "The Real Me", either as a studio or live recording:

- Quadrophenia
- Quadrophenia (soundtrack)
- Hooligans
- Thirty Years of Maximum R&B – A previously unreleased funkier and slightly slower reworking of the song recorded in 1979 with Kenney Jones on drums.
- Blues to the Bush
- The Ultimate Collection
- Live at the Royal Albert Hall
- The Who & Special Guests: Live at the Royal Albert Hall
- Tommy and Quadrophenia Live
- Encore Series 2007 (certain concerts only)
- Greatest Hits Live

== Reception ==
Cash Box predicted that this would be the Who's biggest single since "Won't Get Fooled Again".

== Personnel ==
- Roger Daltrey – lead vocals
- Pete Townshend – guitar
- John Entwistle – bass guitar, French horns
- Keith Moon – drums

== Cover versions ==
The song was covered by heavy metal band W.A.S.P. in 1989 and released as the second single from their fifth album, The Headless Children. The song was a hit in Britain and reached No. 23, on the UK Singles chart. An accompanying video was also made and released.

Rock band Phish played the song as part of their complete performance of the Quadrophenia album on 31 October 1995. It was released as LivePhish vol 14. They played it again about 2 months later sandwiched in the original song, Bathtub Gin, on 29 December 1995 in Worcester, MA.

It was also covered by Pearl Jam during The Who Tribute on VH1 in 2008. In August 2009, Pearl Jam performed the song at the Shepherd's Bush Empire, with Simon Townshend on guitar.

Guy Pratt, bassist for Pink Floyd cover band Nick Mason's Saucerful of Secrets and longtime fan of the Who, plays the distinctive bassline from "The Real Me" during the organ solo in performances of "See Emily Play". This can be heard on the Live at the Roundhouse album.
