= Long Live Rock =

Song by The Who

Single by the Who

from the album Odds & Sods
- B-side: "My Wife: (live); "I'm the Face"
- Released: 12 April 1979 (UK); June 1979 (US)
- Recorded: 1972
- Genre: Hard rock
- Length: 3:56
- Label: Polydor 2121 383 (UK)
- Songwriter: Pete Townshend
- Producer: The Who

The Who UK singles chronology
"Who Are You" / "Had Enough" (1978)	"Long Live Rock" (1979)	"5.15" (1979)

The Who US singles chronology
"Trick of the Light" (1979)	"Long Live Rock" (1979)	"5.15" (1979)

"Long Live Rock" is a 1979 single by the English rock band the Who, written by Pete Townshend and originally recorded in 1972. A different version of the song was performed by Billy Fury's character in the 1973 film That'll Be the Day (a film which starred Who drummer Keith Moon).

The original Who recording was first released on the 1974 album Odds & Sods, which collected unreleased studio outtakes. It was subsequently released as a single in 1979.

== Background ==
"Long Live Rock" was to have been included in Rock Is Dead—Long Live Rock!, a 1972 Who album which was also to have had an accompanying television special, before the album was shelved. Pete Townshend said of the song:

Well there are dozens of these self conscious hymns to the last fifteen years appearing now and here's another one. This was featured briefly in the film for which Keith made his acting debut, That'll Be The Day. Billy Fury sang it. This is most definitely the definitive version. I had an idea once for a new album about the history of The Who called Rock Is Dead—Long Live Rock!. That idea later blossomed into Quadrophenia.

The lyrics of the song describe a concert at the Rainbow Theatre in Finsbury Park, north London.

== Release ==
Following its appearance on Odds & Sods, the song saw a 1974 single release in Israel, Italy (where it was backed with "Pure and Easy") and Japan (where it was backed with "Put the Money Down"). "Long Live Rock" also was featured during the credits of the Who's documentary, The Kids Are Alright (1979). Following this appearance, the song was released as a single in Britain, America, and many other countries. The single reached No. 48 in Britain, as well as No. 54 on the US Billboard Hot 100 and number 66 on the Cashbox charts.

Record World said that "All the elements of the patented Who sound are here, and the song is commercial enough to match last year's 'Won't Get Fooled Again.'"

A live version recorded by the Who at the BBC was released on their album BBC Sessions (2000).

== Charts ==
Chart performance for "Long Live Rock"
Chart (1979)	Peak position
UK Singles (Official Charts)	48
US Billboard Hot 100	54
US Cashbox	66
