= Peter Meaden =

- Born: Peter Alexander Edwin Meaden; 11 November 1941
- Died: 29 July 1978 (aged 36)
- Occupations: Publicist; manager
- Formerly of: The Who; Jimmy James and the Vagabonds; The Crystals; Chuck Berry; The Rolling Stones; Steve Gibbons; Arrows; Captain Beefheart

Peter Alexander Edwin Meaden (11 November 1941 – 29 July 1978) was an English publicist for various musicians and the first manager for the Who. He was a prominent figure in the English Mod subculture of the early 1960s. He is sometimes referred to as the "Mod Father" or "Mod God", reflecting his influence on the Mod subculture.

== Life and career ==
Meaden was born to Stanley and Rosina Meaden (née Alexander) on 11 November 1941. He had one brother, Gerald. As a teenager, Meaden worked in a restaurant before embracing the mod subculture and establishing himself as a face (a recognizable trend-setter within the mod scene). Meaden was involved with Bob Dylan and the Rolling Stones, and was roommates with Mick Jagger. He was often seen around The Scene, a night club in Ham Yard, Soho, London. Meaden was business partner to Andrew Loog Oldham, who was for a while the Rolling Stones manager. Meaden also managed the band Arrows in the early 1970s.

After becoming manager of The Who, Meaden reinvented the band to attract a mod following, changing their name to The High Numbers. He wrote The High Numbers' first and only single, "Zoot Suit”; the B-side of which was "I’m The Face". The songs are set to the tunes of "Got Love If You Want It" by Slim Harpo and "Misery" by the Dynamics, respectively. Meaden wrote new lyrics, incorporating mod-related themes such as fashion and dancing. The single didn't become a hit, and most of the copies that sold were bought by Meaden in a chart fix. After losing control of the band, he went on to manage Jimmy James & The Vagabonds, and worked as a publicist for the Crystals, Chuck Berry and the Rolling Stones.

In January 1968, Meaden briefly represented the American rock musician Captain Beefheart and his group the Magic Band. The group was visiting London for their first United Kingdom performances. Because Meaden had not obtained the necessary work permits in advance, the musicians were detained at customs and denied entry to the country. After temporarily returning to Germany the group was able to work out their immigration status and return to Britain a few days later. By that time they had severed their relationship with Meaden. This incident is fully detailed in the 2002 book Captain Beefheart: The Biography.

After years of drug abuse and a nervous breakdown, Meaden died at his parents' home in Edmonton, London, of a barbiturate overdose in 1978. He is buried in Southgate cemetery, North London, and his funeral was fully paid for by the Who, even though they were unable to attend. Three years before his death he gave an interview with Steve Turner of NME, in which he made the legendary quote, "Modism, Mod living, is an aphorism for clean living under difficult circumstances." Meaden's parents are deceased. His brother, Gerald, died in 2023.

== Bibliography ==
- Captain Beefheart: The Biography by Mike Barnes, Cooper Square Press, (March 2002), 408 pages, ISBN 978-1780380766
- I'm The Face: The Official Peter Meaden Story by John Hellier & Pete Wilky, Wapping Wharf, (Nov 2016), 287 pages, ISBN 978-0995653306
