= Rarities Volume I & Volume II =

1983 compilation album by the Who

- The Volume I album cover, the Volume II album cover also identical, with the exception of the "1966–1968" text, replaced with "1970–1973".

Compilation album by the Who
- Released: 14 August 1983
- Genre: Rock
- Length: Total: 77:15; Vol. 1: 37:09; Vol. 2: 40:06
- Label: Polydor

The Who chronology
Who's Greatest Hits (1983)	Rarities Volume I & Volume II (1983)	The Singles (1984)

Professional ratings
Review scores
Source	Rating
The Encyclopedia of Popular Music	3/5 stars

Rarities Volume I & Volume II is a two-album series collecting songs by the English rock band the Who, released on 14 August 1983 by Polydor Records in the United Kingdom.

== Release history ==
The first release in this series was a single LP titled Join Together - Rarities issued by Polydor in Australia and New Zealand in 1982. This album contained Who songs from UK singles released between 1970 and 1973 that had not previously appeared on LP.

In 1983, after the announcement of the Who's Last Tour, Polydor UK expanded on the original concept by compiling two albums of hard-to-find Who tracks. All of them had previously appeared on singles or EPs. The albums were titled Rarities Vol. 1 "1966–1968" and Rarities Vol. 2 "1970–1973".

The Volume 2 release contains the same content as the earlier Join Together – Rarities album.

After the LP releases the same material was re-released on a single CD. Some copies of the CD version were defective and were replaced by the manufacturer. Defective copies may still be in circulation.

== Track listing ==
=== Rarities Volume I ===
All tracks are written by Pete Townshend, except where noted.

Side one
No.	Title	Original release	Length
1.	"Circles"	Ready Steady Who, 1966	2.26
2.	"Disguises"	Ready Steady Who	3.07
3.	"Batman" (Neal Hefti)	Ready Steady Who	1.23
4.	"Bucket T" (Dean Torrence, Roger Christian, Donald J. Altfeld)	Ready Steady Who	2.06
5.	"Barbara Ann" (Fred Fassert)	Ready Steady Who	1.57
6.	"In the City" (John Entwistle, Keith Moon)	B-side of "I'm a Boy", 1966	2.21
7.	"I've Been Away" (Entwistle)	UK B-side of "Happy Jack", 1966	2.04
8.	"Doctor, Doctor" (Entwistle)	B-side of "Pictures of Lily", 1967	2.57

Side two
No.	Title	Original release	Length
1.	"The Last Time" (Mick Jagger/Keith Richards)	UK non-album single, 1967	2.47
2.	"Under My Thumb" (Mick Jagger/Keith Richards)	B-side of "The Last Time"	2.30
3.	"Someone's Coming" (John Entwistle)	B-side of "I Can See for Miles", 1967; U.S. B-side of "Magic Bus", 1968	2.23
4.	"Mary Anne with the Shaky Hand"	U.S. B-side of "I Can See for Miles", 1967	3.11
5.	"Dogs"	Non-album single, 1968	3.20
6.	"Call Me Lightning"	B-side of "Dogs"; U.S. A-side	2.21
7.	"Dr. Jekyll and Mr. Hyde" (John Entwistle)	UK B-side of "Magic Bus"; U.S. B-side of "Call Me Lightning"	2.34

=== Rarities Volume II ===
Side one
No.	Title	Original release	Length
1.	"Join Together"	Non-album single, 1972	4:15
2.	"I Don't Even Know Myself"	B-side of "Won't Get Fooled Again", 1971	4:54
3.	"Heaven and Hell" (Entwistle)	B-side of "Summertime Blues", 1970	3:30
4.	"When I Was a Boy" (Entwistle)	B-side of "Let's See Action", 1971	3:30
5.	"Let's See Action (Nothing Is Everything)"	Non-album single, 1971	3:53

Side two
No.	Title	Original release	Length
1.	"Relay"	Non-album single, 1972	3:49
2.	"Waspman" (Moon)	B-side of "Relay"	3:02
3.	"Here for More" (Roger Daltrey)	B-side of "The Seeker", 1970	2:24
4.	"Water"	B-side of "5:15" and "Love, Reign o'er Me", 1973	4:31
5.	"Baby Don't You Do It" (Eddie Holland, Lamont Dozier, Brian Holland)	B-side of "Join Together"	6:18

== Personnel ==
- Roger Daltrey – lead vocals, harmonica
- Pete Townshend – guitar, keyboards, backing vocals
- John Entwistle – bass, brass instrument, backing vocals
- Keith Moon – drums

Additional musicians

- Nicky Hopkins – keyboards
