= The Singles (The Who album) =

Compilation album by the Who
- Released: November 1984
- Recorded: 13 October 1965 – 4 November 1980
- Genre: Rock
- Length: 58:26; 2011 Japanese Reissue: 93:30
- Label: Polydor

The Who chronology
Rarities Volume I & Volume II (1983)	The Singles (1984)	Who's Last (1984)

Professional ratings
Review scores
Source	Rating
The Encyclopedia of Popular Music	3/5 stars

The Singles is a compilation of singles by the English rock band the Who, released in November 1984 by Polydor Records. It was not released in the United States or Canada, and it lacks a number of early singles.

The version of "I Can See for Miles" contained herein is not the classic single version, but a BBC live recording with a loud, overdubbed bass track.

== Track listing ==
All songs written by Pete Townshend except where noted.

Side one
No.	Title	Writer(s)	Length
1.	"Substitute"		3:45
2.	"I'm a Boy"		2:37
3.	"Happy Jack"		2:14
4.	"Pictures of Lily"		2:43
5.	"I Can See for Miles" (BBC Recording)		4:05
6.	"Magic Bus"		3:20
7.	"Pinball Wizard"		3:00
8.	"My Generation"		3:18
9.	"Summertime Blues" (Live)	Jerry Capehart, Eddie Cochran	3:22

Side two
No.	Title	Length
1.	"Won't Get Fooled Again" (Single version)	3:38
2.	"Let's See Action" (Nothing Is Everything)	3:57
3.	"Join Together"	4:22
4.	"5:15" (Single version)	4:48
5.	"Squeeze Box"	2:40
6.	"Who Are You" (Single version)	5:00
7.	"You Better You Bet"	5:37

- Japanese pressings contain the mono version of "Magic Bus" (from the UK single)

In December 2011, The Singles was reissued as a 2-CD set in Japan on SHM-CD by Universal.

=== 2011 Japanese reissue track listing ===
Disc 1

1. "I Can't Explain" – 2:06
2. "Anyway, Anyhow, Anywhere" (Townshend, Roger Daltrey) – 2:42
3. "My Generation" – 3:20
4. "Substitute" – 3:49
5. "I'm a Boy" – 2:43
6. "Happy Jack" – 2:13
7. "Pictures of Lily" – 2:46
8. "The Last Time" (Mick Jagger, Keith Richards) – 2:55
9. "I Can See for Miles" – 4:06
10. "Dogs" – 3:07
11. "Magic Bus" – 4:37
12. "Pinball Wizard" – 3:05
13. "See Me, Feel Me" (Single version) – 3:25
14. "The Seeker" – 3:13

Disc 2

1. "Summertime Blues" (Live) (Capehart, Cochran) – 3:25
2. "Won't Get Fooled Again" (Single version) – 3:39
3. "Let's See Action" – 4:00
4. "Join Together" – 4:25
5. "Relay" – 3:56
6. "Long Live Rock" – 3:58
7. "5:15" – 4:54
8. "Squeeze Box" – 2:43
9. "Who Are You" (Alternate mix) – 5:10
10. "You Better You Bet" – 5:39
11. "Don't Let Go the Coat" – 3:45
12. "Athena" – 3:49
