= My Generation: The Very Best of The Who =

Greatest hits album by the Who
- Released: 27 August 1996
- Recorded: 1964–1980
- Genre: Rock
- Length: 76:17
- Label: Polydor
- Producer: Jon Astley

The Who chronology
Thirty Years of Maximum R&B (1994)	My Generation: The Very Best of The Who (1996)	20th Century Masters – The Millennium Collection: The Best of the Who (1999)

Professional ratings
Review scores
Source	Rating
The Encyclopedia of Popular Music	5/5 stars
MusicHound	2.5/5
The Rolling Stone Album Guide	3.5/5 stars

My Generation: The Very Best of The Who is one of the Who's many greatest hits collections, released by Polydor Records internationally and MCA Records in the United States in 1996. Its release coincided with the release of the remastered original albums (omitting My Generation for contractual reasons) and thus contained the newly remastered versions of the songs, and some also remixed.

== Track listing ==
All songs written by Pete Townshend except where noted.

1. "I Can't Explain" – 2:04
  - 1964 single
  - Producer: Shel Talmy
2. "Anyway, Anyhow, Anywhere" (Townshend/Roger Daltrey) – 2:40
  - 1965 single
  - Producer: Shel Talmy
3. "My Generation" – 3:18
  - 1965 single then on My Generation, 1965
  - Producer: Shel Talmy
4. "Substitute" – 3:47
  - 1966 single
  - Producer: Pete Townshend
5. "I'm a Boy" – 2:36
  - 1966 single
  - Producer: Kit Lambert
6. "Boris the Spider" (John Entwistle) – 2:27
  - from A Quick One, 1966
  - Producer: Kit Lambert
7. "Happy Jack" – 2:11
  - 1966 single then on the U.S. release of A Quick One called Happy Jack, 1966
  - Producer: Kit Lambert
8. "Pictures of Lily" – 2:45
  - 1967 single
  - Producer: Kit Lambert
9. "I Can See for Miles" – 4:21
  - 1967 single then on The Who Sell Out, 1967
  - Producer: Kit Lambert
10. "Magic Bus" – 3:15
  - 1968 UK single; from the U.S. compilation Magic Bus: The Who on Tour, 1968
  - Producer: Kit Lambert
11. "Pinball Wizard" – 3:00
  - from Tommy, 1969
  - Producer: Kit Lambert
12. "The Seeker" – 3:22
  - 1970 single
  - Producer: Kit Lambert, The Who
13. "Baba O'Riley" – 5:07
  - from Who's Next, 1971
  - Producer: The Who, Glyn Johns
14. "Won't Get Fooled Again" – 8:32
  - from Who's Next
  - Producer: The Who, Glyn Johns
15. "Let's See Action" – 4:02
  - 1971 single
  - Produced by The Who; Associate Producer: Glyn Johns
16. "5:15" – 4:49
  - from Quadrophenia, 1973
  - Producer: The Who, Kit Lambert & Glyn Johns
17. "Join Together" – 4:22
  - 1972 single
  - Produced by The Who, Associate Producer: Glyn Johns
18. "Squeeze Box" – 2:40
  - from The Who by Numbers, 1975
  - Producer: Glyn Johns
19. "Who Are You" (Single edit) – 5:02
  - from Who Are You, 1978
  - Producer: Glyn Johns & Jon Astley
20. "You Better You Bet" – 5:37
  - from Face Dances, 1981
  - Producer: Bill Szymczyk

== Sales chart performance ==
Chart performance for Who's Better, Who's Best
Chart (1996)	Peak position
Scottish Albums (OCC)	13
UK Albums (OCC)	11

== Certifications ==
Region	Certification	Certified units/sales
United Kingdom (BPI)	Gold	100,000^{^}
United States (RIAA)	Gold	500,000^{^}
^{^} Shipments figures based on certification alone.

== Personnel ==
- Roger Daltrey – lead vocals
- John Entwistle – bass guitar, vocals
- Kenney Jones – drums, percussion on "You Better You Bet"
- Keith Moon – Drums, percussion on all except "You Better You Bet"
- Pete Townshend – guitar, synthesizer, keyboards, vocals

Design

- Design & Art Direction by Richard Evans
