= Who's Better, Who's Best (video) =

Video by the Who
- Released: 1988
- Recorded: 1964-1982
- Length: 60:00
- Label: Universal

Who's Better, Who's Best is a collection of videos by the English rock band the Who released in 1988 as the companion to the compilation album of the same name.

== Songs performed ==
1. "My Generation"
  - Broadcast on Beat-Club
  - Recorded at the Marquee Club on 2 March 1967
2. "I Can't Explain"
  - Original promo video
  - Recorded at various London locales in 1964 and 1965
3. "Anyway, Anyhow, Anywhere"
  - Consists of 8mm concert films shot by Jon Rubin
  - Recorded at various New York City locales in 1967 and 1968
4. "Substitute"
  - Original promo video
  - Recorded in Covent Garden on 21 March 1966
5. "The Kids Are Alright"
  - Original promo video
  - Recorded in Hyde Park in July or August 1966
6. "I'm a Boy"
  - Broadcast on Beat-Club
  - Recorded in Planten un Blomen on 15 January 1967
7. "Happy Jack"
  - Original promo video
  - Recorded at the offices of New Action Ltd. (The Who's management company) on 19 December 1966
8. "Pictures of Lily"
  - Broadcast on Beat-Club
  - Recorded at Bremen Fern-Studio on 1 April 1967
9. "Magic Bus"
  - Tram bus footage recorded in October 1968
  - Concert footage recorded in Voorburg, the Netherlands on 10 March 1973
10. "You Better You Bet"
  - Original promo video
  - Recorded at Shepperton Studios in March 1981
11. "I Can See For Miles"
  - Broadcast on The Smothers Brothers Comedy Hour
  - Recorded at various locations in 1967
  - Cuts following the guitar solo on VHS editions.
12. "Pinball Wizard"
  - Excerpt from Woodstock film
  - Recorded at the Woodstock Music and Art Fair on 17 August 1969
13. "I'm Free"
  - Concert footage directed by Chris Stamp
  - Recorded at the London Coliseum on 14 December 1969
14. "See Me, Feel Me"
  - Excerpt from Woodstock film
  - Recorded at the Woodstock Music and Art Fair on 17 August 1969
15. "Join Together"
  - Original promo video
  - Recorded at The London Studios on 25 June 1972
16. "Who Are You"
  - Excerpt from The Kids Are Alright film
  - Recorded at Ramport Studios on 4 May 1978
17. "Won't Get Fooled Again"
  - Excerpt from The Kids Are Alright film
  - Recorded at Shepperton Studios on 25 May 1978

== Special features ==
1. "Don't Let Go the Coat"
  - Original promo video
  - Recorded at Shepperton Studios in March 1981
2. "Another Tricky Day"
  - Original promo video
  - Recorded at Shepperton Studios in March 1981
3. "Eminence Front"
  - Original promo video
  - Recorded at the Capital Centre in September 1982

These bonus clips are only on the DVD version released a few years later.

== Certifications ==
Certifications for Who's Better, Who's Best
Region	Certification	Certified units/sales
Australia (ARIA)	2× Platinum	30,000^{^}
^{^} Shipments figures based on certification alone.
