= Who's Last =

1984 album

Live album by the Who
- Released: November 1984
- Recorded: 10 October – 14 December 1982
- Genre: Rock
- Length: 78:13
- Label: MCA
- Producer: Cy Langston

The Who chronology
The Singles (1984)	Who's Last (1984)	The Who Collection (1985)

Singles from Who's Last
- 1. "Twist and Shout (Live) / I Can't Explain (Live)" Released: November 1984

Alternative cover

Who's Last is the second live album by the English rock band the Who, recorded in 1982 during what was then billed as the band's "farewell tour". Thus, this album, released in 1984, was to be the band's last album.

== Background ==
Most of Who's Last album was taken from the band's 14 December 1982 show at Richfield Coliseum outside of Cleveland, Ohio, which was their "last concert in the USA" (as Pete Townshend can be heard saying after "Won't Get Fooled Again") this time around. Four songs come from different sources (verified by meticulous comparison with soundboard and audience recordings and videos from that tour). "Behind Blue Eyes" is from the 10 October show at Brendan Byrne Arena in East Rutherford; "Magic Bus" and "Summertime Blues" are from the 20 October show at the Kingdome in Seattle; and "Substitute" is from the 27 October show at Jack Murphy Stadium in San Diego.

Notable by their absence from this recording, released by MCA two years after the tour, are songs from the band's two then recent Warner Bros. Records albums, Face Dances and It's Hard, although they played "The Quiet One" (from Face Dances) and several songs from It's Hard every night on the tour.

Five songs from this tour were released as bonus tracks to the 1997 editions of Face Dances ("The Quiet One" from the Shea Stadium on 13 October 1982), and It's Hard ("It's Hard", "Eminence Front", "Dangerous" and "Cry If You Want" from Toronto on 17 December 1982, the first three of which were later included on the 2007 release Live from Toronto. While that album is from the same tour, it does not contain any of the performances on Who's Last.

== Critical reception ==
Professional ratings
Review scores
Source	Rating
AllMusic	2/5 stars
The Encyclopedia of Popular Music	2/5 stars
MusicHound	1.5/5
The Rolling Stone Album Guide	1/5 stars

Reviewing for AllMusic, critic Stephen Thomas Erlewine wrote of the album "it's a damn long way from Live at Leeds to Who's Last, and the distance between the two extremes is nothing short of stunning. Who's Last is so lifeless and lackluster that it's hard to believe the same band released both records. It may not be a graceful way to end the Who's career, but it's hard to imagine a better testament to why it was time for the band to come to an end." Rolling Stone called the album a "pointless...contractually obligated release from a tired, directionless band on its half-hearted farewell tour."

== Track listing ==
All songs written by Pete Townshend, except where noted.

Side one
No.	Title	Recording date	Length
1.	"My Generation"	14 December 1982, Richfield Coliseum, Richfield Township, Ohio	3:23
2.	"I Can't Explain"	14 December 1982, Richfield Coliseum, Richfield Township, Ohio	2:35
3.	"Substitute"	27 October 1982, Jack Murphy Stadium, San Diego, California	2:57
4.	"Behind Blue Eyes"	10 October 1982, Brendan Byrne Arena, East Rutherford, New Jersey	3:40
5.	"Baba O'Riley"	14 December 1982, Richfield Coliseum, Richfield Township, Ohio	5:37

Side two
No.	Title	Recording date	Length
1.	"Boris the Spider" (John Entwistle)	14 December 1982, Richfield Coliseum, Richfield Township, Ohio	2:41
2.	"Who Are You"	14 December 1982, Richfield Coliseum, Richfield Township, Ohio	6:35
3.	"Pinball Wizard"	14 December 1982, Richfield Coliseum, Richfield Township, Ohio	2:52
4.	"See Me Feel Me/Listening to You"	14 December 1982, Richfield Coliseum, Richfield Township, Ohio	4:41

Side three
No.	Title	Recording date	Length
1.	"Love Reign O'er Me"	14 December 1982, Richfield Coliseum, Richfield Township, Ohio	5:13
2.	"Long Live Rock"	14 December 1982, Richfield Coliseum, Richfield Township, Ohio	3:34
3.	"Reprise"	14 December 1982, Richfield Coliseum, Richfield Township, Ohio	1:38
4.	"Won't Get Fooled Again"	14 December 1982, Richfield Coliseum, Richfield Township, Ohio	11:21

Side four
No.	Title	Recording date	Length
1.	"Doctor Jimmy"	14 December 1982, Richfield Coliseum, Richfield Township, Ohio	4:56
2.	"Magic Bus"	20 October 1982, Kingdome, Seattle, Washington	6:54
3.	"Summertime Blues" (Eddie Cochran, Jerry Capehart)	20 October 1982, Kingdome, Seattle, Washington	3:07
4.	"Twist and Shout" (Phil Medley, Bert Russell)	14 December 1982, Richfield Coliseum, Richfield Township, Ohio	3:59

== Personnel ==
The Who

- Roger Daltrey – vocals, rhythm guitar, harmonica
- Pete Townshend – lead guitar, vocals
- John Entwistle – bass guitar, vocals
- Kenney Jones – drums

Additional musicians

- Tim Gorman – piano, keyboards, synthesizer, backing vocals

Production

- Dave "Cyrano" Langston – production, engineer, mixing
- Bill Smith – cover design
- Gavin Cochrane – photography
- Neal Preston – photography

== Charts ==
Chart (1984)	Peak position
Canada Top Albums/CDs (RPM)	56
UK Albums (Official Charts)	48
US Billboard 200	81

== Certifications ==
Region	Certification	Certified units/sales
United Kingdom (BPI)	Gold	100,000^{‡}
^{‡} Sales+streaming figures based on certification alone.
