= 20th Century Masters – The Millennium Collection: The Best of the Who =

1999 compilation album by the Who

Compilation album by the Who
- Released: 6 April 1999
- Genre: Rock
- Length: 60:37
- Label: Universal Music, Geffen Records

The Who chronology
My Generation: The Very Best of The Who (1996)	20th Century Masters – The Millennium Collection: The Best of the Who (1999)	BBC Sessions (2000)

The Who chronology
Greatest Hits & More (2011)	Icon (2011)	Live at Hull 1970 (2012)

20th Century Masters – The Millennium Collection: The Best of The Who is a compilation album by the English rock band the Who, released on 6 April 1999. In 2011, the album was re-issued as Icon, under the Icon album series with two bonus tracks: "I Can't Explain" and "Baba O'Riley". A deluxe two-CD set called Icon 2 was also released, followed by a vinyl edition in 2020, which added "Anyway, Anyhow, Anywhere".

== Reception ==
Professional ratings
Review scores
Source	Rating
AllMusic	2.5/5 stars
The Rolling Stone Album Guide	2.5/5 stars

=== 20th Century Masters: The Millennium Collection ===
Stephen Thomas Erlewine of AllMusic said that the collection was not sufficient for any buyer: "serious fans will want something more extensive" and "neophytes would be best served by more well-chosen collections".

=== Icon ===
Professional ratings
Review scores
Source	Rating
AllMusic	3/5 stars

== Track listing ==
All tracks are written by Pete Townshend.

20th Century Masters – The Millennium Collection: The Best of the Who track listing
No.	Title	Length
1.	"My Generation"	3:19
2.	"Happy Jack"	2:11
3.	"I Can See for Miles"	4:22
4.	"Magic Bus"	3:17
5.	"Pinball Wizard"	3:02
6.	"Squeeze Box"	2:43
7.	"Behind Blue Eyes"	3:42
8.	"Who Are You"	6:17
9.	"Join Together"	4:24
10.	"Won't Get Fooled Again"	8:34
Total length:		60:37

=== Icon track listing ===
All tracks are written by Pete Townshend.

Icon track listing
No.	Title	Length
1.	"I Can't Explain"	2:05
2.	"My Generation"	3:19
3.	"Happy Jack"	2:11
4.	"I Can See for Miles"	4:22
5.	"Magic Bus"	3:17
6.	"Pinball Wizard"	3:02
7.	"Squeeze Box"	2:43
8.	"Baba O'Riley"	5:00
9.	"Behind Blue Eyes"	3:42
10.	"Who Are You"	6:17
11.	"Join Together"	4:24
12.	"Won't Get Fooled Again"	8:34
Total length:		67:42

=== Icon 2 track listing ===
All tracks are written by Pete Townshend, except where noted.

CD 1
No.	Title	Length
1.	"I Can't Explain"	2:05
2.	"My Generation"	3:19
3.	"The Kids Are Alright"	3:05
4.	"Substitute"	3:47
5.	"Happy Jack"	2:11
6.	"Pictures of Lily"	2:44
7.	"I Can See For Miles"	4:22
8.	"Magic Bus"	3:17
9.	"Pinball Wizard"	3:02
10.	"I'm Free"	2:39
11.	"The Seeker"	3:12
12.	"Won't Get Fooled Again"	8:34

CD 2
No.	Title	Writer(s)	Length
1.	"Baba O'Riley"		5:00
2.	"Behind Blue Eyes"		3:42
3.	"Let's See Action"		3:57
4.	"Join Together"		4:24
5.	"5:15"		5:00
6.	"Love, Reign o'er Me"		6:01
7.	"Squeeze Box"		2:43
8.	"Who Are You"		6:17
9.	"You Better You Bet"		5:36
10.	"Eminence Front"		5:39
11.	"Real Good Looking Boy"	Townshend, Luigi Creatore, Hugo Peretti, George David Weiss	5:42
12.	"It's Not Enough"	Townshend, Rachel Fuller	4:02

== Certifications ==
Certifications for 20th Century Masters – The Millennium Collection: The Best of the Who
Region	Certification	Certified units/sales
United States (RIAA)	Platinum	1,000,000^{^}
^{^} Shipments figures based on certification alone.
