= The Who Collection =

- Volume One

Greatest hits album series by the Who
- Released: 30 September 1985
- Recorded: 1964–1980
- Genre: Rock
- Length: 125.35
- Label: Polydor
- Producer: Jon Astley; Glyn Johns; Kit Lambert; The Who

The Who chronology
Who's Last (1984)	The Who Collection (1985)	Who's Missing (1985)

Volume Two

The Who Collection is a compilation album by the English rock band the Who, released on 30 September 1985 by Polydor Records. It is notable for containing a unique remix of "Won't Get Fooled Again" and for being one of the few compact disc appearances of the extended version of "Magic Bus".

The original vinyl release was a double LP package. On compact disc it first appeared as a double-CD set, then later as two single individually numbered volumes.

== Track listing ==
All songs written by Pete Townshend, except where noted

Volume One

Side one
No.	Title	Writer(s)	Original release	Length
1.	"I Can't Explain"		Non album single (1964/1965)	2:07
2.	"Anyway, Anyhow, Anywhere"	Roger Daltrey, Townshend	Non album single (1965)	2:42
3.	"My Generation"		My Generation (1965)	3:17
4.	"Substitute"		Non album single (1966)	3:49
5.	"A Legal Matter"		My Generation	2:49
6.	"The Kids Are Alright"		My Generation	3:05
7.	"I'm a Boy"		Non album single (1966)	2:39
8.	"Happy Jack"		Non album single (1966)	2:13
9.	"Boris the Spider"	John Entwistle	A Quick One (1966)	2:29
10.	"Pictures of Lily"		Non album single (1967)	2:44
11.	"I Can See for Miles"		The Who Sell Out (1967)	4:08

Side two
No.	Title	Original release	Length
1.	"Won't Get Fooled Again"	Who's Next (1971)	8:32
2.	"The Seeker"	Non album single (1970)	3:12
3.	"Let's See Action"	Non album single (1971)	3:57
4.	"Join Together"	Non album single (1972)	4:22
5.	"Relay"	Non album single (1972)	3:54
6.	"Love, Reign o'er Me"	Quadrophenia (1973)	6:01
7.	"Squeeze Box"	The Who By Numbers (1975)	2:41

Volume Two

Side three
No.	Title	Writer(s)	Original release	Length
1.	"Who Are You" (Single Edit)		Who Are You (1978)	5:04
2.	"Long Live Rock"		Odds & Sods (1974)	3:59
3.	"5:15" (Single Edit)		Quadrophenia	4:19
4.	"You Better You Bet" (Omitted from CD release)		Face Dances (1981)	5:36
5.	"Magic Bus" (Extended Mix)		Non album single (1968); Meaty Beaty Big and Bouncy (1971)	4:36
6.	"Summertime Blues" (Live)	Eddie Cochran, Jerry Capehart	Live at Leeds (1970)	3:27
7.	"Shakin' All Over" (Live)	Johnny Kidd, Gus Robinson	Live at Leeds	4:31

Side four
No.	Title	Original release	Length
1.	"Pinball Wizard"	Tommy (1969)	3:01
2.	"The Acid Queen"	Tommy	3:35
3.	"I'm Free"	Tommy	2:40
4.	"We're Not Gonna Take It"	Tommy	7:03
5.	"Baba O'Riley"	Who's Next	4:59
6.	"Behind Blue Eyes"	Who's Next	3:41
7.	"Bargain"	Who's Next	5:33

== Chart ==
Chart (1985)	Peak position
UK Albums (OCC)	44

== Certifications ==
Region	Certification	Certified units/sales
United Kingdom (BPI)	Gold	100,000^{^}
^{^} Shipments figures based on certification alone.
