= Live from Toronto (The Who album) =

2006 album

Live album by the Who
- Released: 21 April 2006
- Recorded: 17 December 1982, Maple Leaf Gardens, Toronto, Ontario, Canada
- Genre: Hard rock
- Length: 106:43
- Label: Immortal

The Who chronology
Endless Wire (2006)	Live from Toronto (2006)	View from a Backstage Pass (2007)

Professional ratings
Review scores
Source	Rating
AllMusic	3/5 stars

Live from Toronto is a double live album by the English rock band the Who recorded during the last concert of the It's Hard Tour at Maple Leaf Gardens in Toronto, 17 December 1982. These performances were originally broadcast live on cable TV and FM radio across the U.S. and Canada. It was later released in the early 1980s on VHS video tape.

Keyboard player Tim Gorman performed with the Who on the 1982 tour. Tim reunited with the group in 2006 to record overdubs for the re-release of this material.

This 2006 edition of the concert was also released as a DVD. Both the DVD and double CD are legal releases, but they are not considered to be "authorized" products by the band and/or its management.

== Track listing CD ==
All songs written by Pete Townshend except where noted.

Disc one

1. "My Generation" – 2:48
2. "I Can't Explain" – 2:30
3. "Dangerous" (John Entwistle) – 3:39
4. "Sister Disco" – 5:13
5. "The Quiet One" (Entwistle) – 4:22
6. "It's Hard" – 4:57
7. "Eminence Front" – 5:36
8. "Baba O'Riley" – 5:19
9. "Boris the Spider" (Entwistle) – 3:22
10. "Drowned" – 8:11
11. "Love Ain't for Keeping" – 2:40

Disc two

1. "Pinball Wizard" – 2:47
2. "See Me, Feel Me" – 4:14
3. "Who Are You" – 6:28
4. "5:15" – 6:27
5. "Love, Reign O'er Me" – 4:47
6. "Long Live Rock" – 5:06
7. "Won't Get Fooled Again" – 10:07
8. "Naked Eye" – 7:00
9. "Squeeze Box" – 2:52
10. "Young Man Blues" (Mose Allison) – 4:38
11. "Twist and Shout" (Bert Russell, Phil Medley) – 3:40

== Track listing DVD ==
All songs written by Pete Townshend except where noted.

DVD

1. "My Generation" – 2:48
2. "I Can't Explain" – 2:30
3. "Dangerous" (John Entwistle) – 3:39
4. "Sister Disco" – 5:13
5. "The Quiet One" (Entwistle) – 4:22
6. "It's Hard" – 4:57
7. "Eminence Front" – 5:36
8. "Baba O'Riley" – 5:19
9. "Boris the Spider" (Entwistle) – 3:22
10. "Drowned" – 8:11
11. "Love Ain't for Keeping" – 2:40
12. "Pinball Wizard" – 2:47
13. "See Me, Feel Me" – 4:14
14. "Who Are You" – 6:28
15. "5:15" – 6:27
16. "Love, Reign O'er Me" – 4:47
17. "Long Live Rock" – 5:06
18. "Won't Get Fooled Again" – 10:07
19. "Naked Eye" – 7:00
20. "Squeeze Box" – 2:52
21. "Young Man Blues" (Mose Allison) – 4:38
22. "Twist and Shout" (Bert Russell, Phil Medley) – 3:40

== Personnel ==
The Who

- Roger Daltrey – lead vocals, rhythm guitar, harmonica
- Pete Townshend – lead guitar, backing and lead vocals
- John Entwistle – bass, backing and lead vocals
- Kenney Jones – drums

Additional musicians

- Tim Gorman – keyboards
