= Who's Better, Who's Best =

1988 compilation album by the Who

Greatest hits album by the Who
- Released: 7 March 1988
- Recorded: 1964–1980
- Genre: Rock
- Length: 59:49
- Labels: Polydor (UK); MCA (US)
- Producers: Jon Astley; Glyn Johns; Kit Lambert; Bill Szymczyk; Shel Talmy; The Who

The Who chronology
Two's Missing (1987)	Who's Better, Who's Best (1988)	Won't Get Fooled Again EP (1988)

Professional ratings
Review scores
Source	Rating
AllMusic	4/5 stars
The Encyclopedia of Popular Music	4/5 stars
MusicHound Rock	2/5
The Rolling Stone Album Guide	3/5 stars
Tom Hull	A−

Who's Better, Who's Best: This Is the Very Best of the Who is a 1988 compilation album by the English rock band the Who. A compilation of videos also titled Who's Better, Who's Best was released in 1988 as well.

== Track listing ==
All tracks composed by Pete Townshend, except where noted.

1. "My Generation" – 3:16
2. "Anyway, Anyhow, Anywhere" (Townshend, Roger Daltrey) – 2:39
3. "The Kids Are Alright" – 2:45
4. "Substitute" – 3:46
5. "I'm a Boy" – 2:38
6. "Happy Jack" – 2:12
7. "Pictures of Lily" – 2:42
8. "I Can See for Miles" – 4:06
9. "Who Are You" (single edit) – 5:03
10. "Won't Get Fooled Again" (single edit) – 3:38
11. "Magic Bus" – 3:19
12. "I Can't Explain" – 2:04
13. "Pinball Wizard" – 2:59
14. "I'm Free" – 2:40
15. "See Me, Feel Me" – 3:30
16. "Squeeze Box" – 2:40
17. "Join Together" (coda omitted) – 4:19
18. "You Better You Bet" – 5:37

The track listing refers to "Won't Get Fooled Again" as an "Extended Version". The track is in fact an edited version released as a single on the American release and the full version on the British release.

The track listing for the UK CD edition included unedited versions of "The Kids Are Alright" (3:05) and "Won't Get Fooled Again" (8:31). The front cover also differed, showing the band performing live in 1973.

"Baba O'Riley" is a bonus track on CD copies.

== Personnel ==
- Roger Daltrey – vocals
- Pete Townshend – guitars, keyboards, vocals
- John Entwistle – bass guitar. vocals
- Keith Moon – drums
- Kenney Jones – drums on "You Better You Bet"

Design

- Cover design, US and UK versions, by Richard Evans
- Cover photography by Ethan Russell
- Sleeve notes by Richard Barnes

== Chart performance ==
Chart performance for Who's Better, Who's Best
Chart (1988)	Peak position
Australian Albums (ARIA)	51
Belgian Albums (Ultratop Wallonia)	45
UK Albums (Official Charts)	10

== Certifications ==
Certifications for Who's Better, Who's Best
Region	Certification	Certified units/sales
United Kingdom (BPI)	Gold	100,000^{^}
United States (RIAA)	Gold	500,000^{^}
^{^} Shipments figures based on certification alone.
