= Thirty Years of Maximum R&B Live =

- Produced by: Nick Ryle, Robert Rosenberg & Bill Curbishley
- Starring: The Who
- Music by: The Who
- Production company: Universal Pictures
- Distributed by: MCA
- Release date: 6 July 1994
- Running time: 150 min.
- Language: English

Thirty Years of Maximum R&B Live is a 1994 compilation video by the English rock band the Who. The compilation covers the band live from 1965 to 1989 and is edited together with interviews with band members Roger Daltrey, John Entwistle, and Pete Townshend. A 4-disc compilation boxset called Thirty Years of Maximum R&B released in 1994 is also available.

The DVD was released in 2001 and was eventually re-released (renamed Maximum R&B Live) as a 2-disc package with the bonus content of the Rockpalast concert from 28 March 1981. The Tanglewood Music Shed songs from 1970 have been removed and replaced by songs from London Colliseum 1969, Kilburn 1977, and Shea Stadium 1982.

== Songs performed (initial release) ==
1. "Anyway, Anyhow, Anywhere" (Richmond Athletic Grounds, 1965)
2. "So Sad About Us" (Marquee Club, 1967)
3. "A Quick One, While He's Away" (Monterey Pop Festival, 1967)
4. "Happy Jack" (London Coliseum, 1969)
5. "Heaven and Hell" (Tanglewood Music Shed, 1970)
6. "I Can't Explain" (Tanglewood Music Shed, 1970)
7. "Water" (Tanglewood Music Shed, 1970)
8. "Young Man Blues" (Isle of Wight Festival, 1970)
9. "I Don’t Even Know Myself" (Isle of Wight Festival, 1970)
10. "My Generation" (Voorburg, 1973)
11. "Substitute" (Charlton Athletic Football Grounds, 1974)
12. "Drowned" (Charlton Athletic Football Grounds, 1974)
13. "Bell Boy" (Charlton Athletic Football Grounds, 1974)
14. "My Generation Blues" (Charlton Athletic Football Grounds, 1974)
15. "Dreaming from the Waist" (Richfield Coliseum, 1975)
16. "Sister Disco" (Shepperton Studios, 1979)
17. "Who Are You" (Shepperton Studios, 1979)
18. "5:15" (International Amphitheatre, 1979)
19. "My Wife" (International Amphitheatre, 1979)
20. "Music Must Change" (International Amphitheatre, 1979)
21. "Pinball Wizard" (International Amphitheatre, 1979)
22. "Behind Blue Eyes" (Hammersmith Odeon, 1979)
23. "Love Reign O'er Me" (Shea Stadium, 1982)
24. "Boris the Spider" (Giants Stadium, 1989)
25. "I Can See for Miles" (Giants Stadium, 1989)
26. "See Me, Feel Me" (Giants Stadium, 1989)

== 2009 re-release track listing ==
Disc 1

1. "Anyway, Anyhow, Anywhere" (Richmond Blues & Jazz Festival, 1965)
2. "So Sad About Us" (Marquee Club, 1967)
3. Finnish TV Archive Performance
4. "A Quick One, While He’s Away" (Monterey Pop Festival, 1967)
5. "Happy Jack" (London Coliseum, 1969)
6. "I Can't Explain" (London Coliseum, 1969)
7. "Young Man Blues" (Isle of Wight Festival, 1970)
8. "I Don't Even Know Myself" (Isle of Wight Festival, 1970)
9. "My Generation" (Voorburg, 1973)
10. Interviews (Cow Palace 1973 Clip)
11. "Substitute" (Charlton Football Club, 1974)
12. "Drowned" (Charlton Football Club, 1974)
13. "Bell Boy" (Charlton Football Club, 1974)
14. "My Generation Blues" (Charlton Football Club, 1974)
15. "Dreaming from the Waist" (Cleveland, 1975)
16. "Baba O'Riley" (Kilburn, 1977)
17. Keith Moon Tributes
18. "Sister Disco" (Shepperton Studios, 1979)
19. "Who Are You" (Shepperton Studios, 1979)
20. "5:15" (International Amphitheatre, Chicago, 1979)
21. "My Wife" (International Amphitheatre, Chicago, 1979)
22. "Music Must Change" (International Amphitheatre, Chicago, 1979)
23. "Pinball Wizard" (International Amphitheatre, Chicago, 1979)
24. "Behind Blue Eyes" (Concert for Kampuchea 1979)
25. "Love Reign O'er Me" (Shea Stadium, 1982)
26. "Won't Get Fooled Again" (Shea Stadium, 1982)
27. "Boris the Spider" (Giants Stadium, 1989)
28. "I Can See for Miles" (Giants Stadium, 1989)
29. "See Me, Feel Me" (Giants Stadium, 1989)

Disc 2: Live at Rockpalast 28 March 1981

1. "Substitute"
2. "I Can't Explain"
3. "Baba O'Riley"
4. "The Quiet One"
5. "Don't Let Go the Coat"
6. "Sister Disco"
7. "You Better You Bet"
8. "Drowned"
9. "Behind Blue Eyes"
10. "Another Tricky Day"
11. "Pinball Wizard"
12. "Who Are You"
13. "5:15"
14. "My Generation"
15. "Won't Get Fooled Again"
16. "Summertime Blues"
17. "Twist and Shout"
18. "See Me, Feel Me"
