= It's Hard (song) =

1982 single by The Who

Single by the Who

from the album It's Hard
- B-side: "Dangerous"
- Released: February 1983
- Recorded: June 1982
- Studio: Turn Up-Down Studio at Glyn Johns' home in Surrey, England
- Length: 3:47
- Label: Polydor (UK); Warner Bros. (US)
- Songwriter: Pete Townshend
- Producer: The Who

The Who singles chronology
"Eminence Front" (1982)	"It's Hard" (1983)	"Twist and Shout (live)" (1984)

Official audio
- "It's Hard" on YouTube

"It's Hard" is a song written by Pete Townshend that featured on the English rock band the Who's tenth studio album, It's Hard (1982), of which it was the title track. It was released as the third and final vinyl single from the album in 1983, backed with the John Entwistle written song "Dangerous", but failed to chart, although it reached number 39 on the US Billboard Hot Mainstream Rock Tracks. This would become the last Who single of new material until "Real Good Looking Boy" in 2004, and the last album single by them until "Black Widow's Eyes", two years later.

== Background ==
The lyrics to "It's Hard" were written long before the actual song. It was originally presented to the Who in 1981 for the Who's previous studio album, Face Dances, in the form of a demo called "Popular", but the band's reaction was cool towards it, as the album was nearly finished at the time. The music of "Popular" was later re-written and the lyrics slightly altered and the song, as "It's Hard", was shown to the Who again and this time featured on the album. Pete Townshend said of the song:

This one I've had for quite a long time as a lyric written on a piece of paper...I was imagining myself as a kind of Johnny Cash figure and talking about bravado and angst and, you know, it's easy to complain and it's easy to bluff. It's very hard to do.

Townshend also said of the band's reaction to "Popular":

The band reaction was lukewarm; we were close to ending the album and were all unsure of what was happening. I later removed the 'Popular' chorus, replaced it with 'It's Hard' and managed to sell another song!

The original demo of "Popular" is featured on the Pete Townshend solo compilation album Scoop, which was released in 1983. The original mix featured an error in Townshend's opening guitar solo, which was fixed in the 1997 remix.

== Lyrics and music ==
The lyrics of "It's Hard" describe how hard life can be. Steve Grantley and Alan G. Parker comment that the song begins by sounding like the theme is the hardships by those who are not well off, "but it turns out to be a self-pitying, repetitive lament about the protagonist's own bad luck." Who biographer John Atkins also describes the lyrics as "self-pitying".

Grantley and Parker say the song has "a certain rocking energy" but they consider the riff to be a ripoff of Bruce Springsteen's 1978 song "Badlands."

== Critical reception ==
Cashbox called it "standard Who fare", saying that while Daltrey lists the reasons life is hard, Townsend's guitar interlude and harmony vocals "smooth out the rough goings".

Atkins considers "It's Hard" to be "routine", unoriginal and lacking in inspiration, describing it as "predictable, bland soft rock with weak chord work. Atkins considered its forebear, "Popular", to be "equally insipid". Chris Charlesworth calls "It's Hard" a "cliché ridden effort" and particularly criticizes the song's lack of energy. Mike Segretto regards the song as "middling". Grantley and Parker regard it as one of the "highlights" of the It's Hard album, but criticize the riff being taken from Springsteen and that Townshend is now "simply moaning about how tough it is at the top" rather than, as he did previously, voicing the concerns of the "inarticulate young working class".

== Live history ==
"It's Hard" was only performed live on the tour promoting the album in 1982. Lead vocalist Roger Daltrey played "It's Hard" on rhythm guitar when the Who performed it live, which was very unusual. It was played at every concert on the tour, and featured a short full-band jam at the end. The version from the tour's final show at Toronto's Maple Leaf Gardens on 17 December is included as a bonus track on the 1997 rerelease of It's Hard.

=== The Who albums and videos featuring "It's Hard" ===
In order of release:

- It's Hard
- The Who Rocks America
- Live from Toronto

== Personnel ==
The Who

- Roger Daltrey – lead vocals, rhythm guitar in live performances
- Pete Townshend – rhythm and lead guitars, backing vocals
- John Entwistle – bass guitar
- Kenney Jones – drums

Additional musicians

- Tim Gorman – synthesiser
