= Magic Bus =

Magic Bus may refer to:

== Arts and entertainment ==
- "Magic Bus" (song), a 1968 song by the Who
- Magic Bus: The Who on Tour, a 1968 album by the Who
- "Magic Bus (Intro)", a 2002 song by Kottonmouth Kings from Rollin' Stoned
- Magic Bus (studio), a Japanese animation studio

== Transport ==
- Magic Bus (Stagecoach), a bus service in the United Kingdom
- Bus 142, on the Stampede Trail near Healy, Alaska, United States

== Miscellaneous ==
- Magic Bus formation at Red Rock Canyon National Conservation Area in Nevada, U.S.

== See also ==
- The Magic School Bus, a series of children's books and a TV series
- Furthur (bus), a bus used by Ken Kesey and his Merry Pranksters during their 1964 Magic Trip
