= Call Me Lightning =

Call Me Lightning may refer to:

- Call Me Lightning (band), an indie rock band from Milwaukee, Wisconsin
- "Call Me Lightning" (song), a 1968 song by The Who
