= Who's Greatest Hits =

1983 album

Greatest hits album by the Who
- Released: May 1983
- Length: 50:47
- Label: MCA
- Producer: Glyn Johns

The Who chronology
It's Hard (1982)	Who's Greatest Hits (1983)	Rarities Volume I & Volume II (1983)

Professional ratings
Review scores
Source	Rating
AllMusic	3/5 stars
MusicHound	2/5

Who's Greatest Hits is a 1983 greatest hits compilation album by the English rock band the Who released in the US. It includes the rare track "Relay", presented here in its original full length. An earlier appearance on Hooligans has shortened it by almost 30 seconds. The vinyl LP also includes the original single version of "Won't Get Fooled Again". On the CD it's the full-length album version. Who's Greatest Hits has sold over 2 million copies and was certified 2× platinum by the Recording Industry Association of America.

== Track listing ==
All songs written by Pete Townshend except where noted.

Side one

1. "Substitute" – 3:50
2. "The Seeker" – 3:14
3. "Magic Bus" – 3:25
4. "My Generation" – 3:19
5. "Pinball Wizard" – 3:03
6. "Happy Jack" – 2:12
7. "Won't Get Fooled Again" – 8:33

Side two

1. "My Wife" (John Entwistle) – 3:36
2. "Squeeze Box" – 2:43
3. "Relay" – 3:48
4. "5:15" (Single version) – 4:53
5. "Love Reign o'er Me" (Edited version) – 3:07
6. "Who Are You" (Single version) – 5:02

== Charts ==
Original album
Chart (1983)	Peak position
US Billboard 200	94

== Certifications ==
Region	Certification	Certified units/sales
United States (RIAA)	2× Platinum	2,000,000^{^}
^{^} Shipments figures based on certification alone.
