= You (The Who song) =

Song by The Who

Song by the Who

from the album Face Dances
- Released: 16 March 1981
- Recorded: July–December 1980
- Studio: Odyssey (London)
- Genre: Heavy metal
- Length: 4:31
- Label: Polydor; Warner Bros.
- Songwriter: John Entwistle
- Producer: Bill Szymczyk

Official audio
- "You" on YouTube

"You" is a song by the English rock band the Who, written by bassist John Entwistle and sung by Roger Daltrey. It is one of two songs written by Entwistle for Face Dances (the Who's first studio album without drummer Keith Moon); the other song being "The Quiet One". "You" was released as the B-side on the "Don't Let Go the Coat" single and reached #51 on the US Top Album Rock Tracks.

== Background ==
The song was intended to appear on one of Entwistle's solo studio albums, but drummer Kenney Jones (who replaced the deceased Moon) convinced him to use the song for the Who. Jones said "When I first joined (the Who), John (Entwistle) and I used to go down to Shepperton and just work out and have a play. He was working on this song and trying to arrange it, we both sort of arranged it together. I just loved it so much, he was going to put it on his solo album, and I said 'I think that's a definite Who song. You can't do that.' I made him sit on it for a year until we actually started recording. I'm so pleased I did it is definitely one of those exciting songs."

"You" was never performed live by the Who but it was played by Entwistle's solo bands.

== Critical reception ==
Authors Alan Parker and Steve Grantley said that the song was "possibly the worst lyrics John ever penned". They also said that the lyrics "highlight just how desperate for material the band were". Freelance writer Mike Segretto wrote that "You" was "a heavy-metal drag that may be the worst thing in the entire Who discography."
