= Dr. Jekyll and Mr. Hyde (song) =

Single by the Who

from the album Magic Bus: The Who on Tour
- A-side: "Call Me Lightning" (US); "Magic Bus" (UK)
- Released: 16 March 1968 (US); 18 September 1968 (UK)
- Recorded: 5 January 1968
- Studio: IBC, London
- Genre: Psychedelic rock
- Length: 2:38 (UK version); 2:24 (US version)
- Label: Decca (US); Track (UK)
- Songwriter: John Entwistle
- Producer: Kit Lambert

The Who US singles chronology
"I Can See for Miles" (1967)	"Dr. Jekyll and Mr. Hyde" (1968)	"Magic Bus" (1968)

The Who UK singles chronology
"Dogs" (1968)	"Dr. Jekyll and Mr. Hyde" (1968)	"Pinball Wizard" (1969)

"Dr. Jekyll and Mr. Hyde" is a song by the English rock band the Who. It was written by the band's bassist, John Entwistle.

== Background and composition ==
The song is about drummer Keith Moon's drinking problems. This is the first of two songs from The Who written about Keith Moon, the second being "Doctor Jimmy" from the album Quadrophenia. Who biographer John Atkins calls it "a macabre tribute to Keith Moon."

This song, as well as "Boris the Spider" and "Silas Stingy" all had lyrics that suited children. Kit Lambert had the idea of making a kids' album composed entirely of songs like these, but it never saw the light of day.

== Release ==
"Dr. Jekyll and Mr. Hyde" had been considered as a possible single release, along with "Call Me Lightning", but it was released as the B-side of "Call Me Lightning" instead. Atkins laments this decision, stating that although its horror film imagery was not ideal for a single, it was far better than "Call Me Lightning". He considers it one of Entwistle's best songs, saying that the "music and performance combine to create a perfectly chilling horror-comic gothic mood piece." Charlesworth states that the song "succeeds admirably".

Two very different versions of this song exist. The first one, running 2:24, is the B-side to the US single "Call Me Lightning". It is still available on the 1968 compilation album Magic Bus: The Who on Tour. The second version, which exceeds the former's length by 14 seconds, was the B-Side to the UK single "Magic Bus". This version has a more prominent guitar line, as well as spooky "Mr. Hyde" effects (the voice John Entwistle had used in chorus of the song "Boris the Spider") and can be found on the Japanese release of the Who's Missing/Two's Missing compilation released in 2011.

== Reception ==
"Dr. Jekyll and Mr. Hyde" has been compared to a Hammer horror film. The lyrics describe the good and evil elements within a single character, reminiscent of Robert Louis Stevenson's novel Strange Case of Dr Jekyll and Mr Hyde. The music incorporates a "scarey opening" and has a melody led by Entwistle's bass guitar line, which Chris Charlesworth describes as "menacing" and Atkins describes as "grinding". It also contains a French horn solo that Charlesworth describes as "spooky". Atkins describes the melody as being "strongly inventive".

Cash Box called "Dr. Jekyll and Mr. Hyde" a "psychedelified throbber on the lid that could attract added attention".
