= Two's Missing =

1987 album

Compilation album by the Who
- Released: April 1987
- Recorded: 1965–1972
- Genres: Rock; power pop; blues
- Length: 44:39
- Label: MCA
- Producers: Glyn Johns; Kit Lambert; Shel Talmy; The Who

The Who chronology
Who's Missing (1985)	Two's Missing (1987)	Who's Better, Who's Best (1988)

Professional ratings
Review scores
Source	Rating
AllMusic	3/5 stars
MusicHound	2.5/5

Two's Missing is a compilation album by the English rock band the Who.

== Album content ==
Released in 1987 on vinyl, cassette and CD, Two's Missing gathered singles and EP tracks that hadn't appeared on album or CD. The album cover design is by Richard Evans.

== Reissues ==
The album was reissued on CD in Japan as a limited edition release on 24 December 2011 with four additional tracks carried over from the Japan-only bonus CD of Then and Now, as a two-CD set together with Who's Missing. Two's Missing was remastered by Jon Astley.

== Track listing ==
Side one
No.	Title	Writer(s)	Length
1.	"Bald Headed Woman" (mono)	Shel Talmy	2:09
2.	"Under My Thumb" (mono)	Mick Jagger, Keith Richards	2:35
3.	"My Wife" (live recording)	John Entwistle	6:38
4.	"I'm a Man"	Ellas McDaniel	3:11
5.	"Dogs" (mono)	Pete Townshend	3:05
6.	"Dogs (Part 2)"	Keith Moon	2:26
7.	"Circles (revised version)" (mono)	Townshend	2:09

Side two
No.	Title	Writer(s)	Length
1.	"The Last Time" (mono)	Jagger, Richards	2:50
2.	"Water"	Townshend	4:32
3.	"Daddy Rolling Stone"	Otis Blackwell	2:48
4.	"Heat Wave" (original version)	Holland-Dozier-Holland	2:40
5.	"Goin' Down" (Live)	Don Nix	3:41
6.	"Motoring"	Ivy Jo Hunter, Phil Jones, William "Mickey" Stevenson	2:50
7.	"Waspman"	Keith Moon	3:05

Japanese CD Reissue Bonus Tracks
No.	Title	Writer(s)	Length
15.	"Dr. Jekyll and Mr. Hyde" (U.S. mono single version)	Entwistle	2:26
16.	"Call Me Lightning" (mono)	Townshend	2:24
17.	"Melancholia"	Townshend	3:08
18.	"Eyesight to the Blind" (alternate vocal version)	Sonny Boy Williamson II	2:16
19.	"I Don't Even Know Myself" (cancelled EP version)	Townshend	4:10
