= Another Tricky Day =

Song by The Who

Song by the Who

from the album Face Dances
- Released: 16 March 1981
- Recorded: July – December 1980
- Studio: Odyssey (London)
- Genre: Rock
- Length: 4:55
- Label: Polydor; Warner Bros.
- Songwriter: Pete Townshend
- Producer: Bill Szymczyk

Music video
- "Another Tricky Day" on YouTube

"Another Tricky Day" is the ninth track on the Who's ninth studio album, Face Dances (1981), written by their lead guitarist Pete Townshend. The song reached #6 on the US Top Album Rock Tracks although, never given a commercial single release.

== Background ==
According to Townshend, keyboardist John Bundrick, who was playing with the Who on tour, inspired the song. The lyrics of the track claim that there is "no social crisis", saying that this so-called dilemma is "just another tricky day". Steve Grantley and Alan Parker, authors of the book The Who by Numbers: The Story of the Who Through Their Music, compare the track's lyrical content to the Rolling Stones' 1969 song, "You Can't Always Get What You Want". They also say that the track is "still a pragmatic and optimistic note on which to end [Face Dances]." The editors of Rolling Stone described the song as "a defiant yet complex tune about music's power amid life's problems." Author Chris Charlesworth described the lyrics as "pessimistic" while acknowledging that the song was "more interesting than most on Face Dances." In 2015, the editors of Rolling Stone rated "Another Tricky Day" as the Who's 48th all-time greatest song.

"Another Tricky Day" generally has received positive reviews. Rolling Stone's Tom Carson said "In 'Another Tricky Day,' the constant shifts of melodic focus – a rhythm guitar unraveling here; a rumble of bass, a quick harmony or swatch of rippling keyboards there – express the song's life-goes-on theme. The changes of mood from line to line – rebellious, fatalistic, confident, worried – are all held together by the chorus: 'This is no social crisis. . . Just gotta get used to it. With its carefully modulated dynamics and Daltrey's finest singing, "Another Tricky Day" approaches perfection, effortlessly achteving (sic.) the calm within the storm that most of the record strains for." Grantley and Parker said that the track "is the real high point of Face Dances" and that "the band have regained much of the swagger of old... just in time".

"Another Tricky Day" was included on the UK version of the compilation album The Ultimate Collection (2002).

== Music video ==
A music video in the same style as the videos for "You Better You Bet" and "Don't Let Go the Coat" was made at the same session as the videos for the singles, even though the song was not later released as a single.

== Live history ==
Some lyrics of "Another Tricky Day" first appeared live in a 1980 jam of "Dance It Away" that the Who performed. It was then played live on several tours, including the band's 1981 tour, as well as their 2002 and 2004 tours. Roger Daltrey performed the song on his 2022 UK tour. It has also been a part of the Who's setlist on their 2022 North America Tour.
