= Rock Is Dead—Long Live Rock! =

Studio album

Studio album (unreleased) by the Who
- Recorded: May–June 1972
- Genre: Rock

Rock Is Dead—Long Live Rock was the title of an unreleased 1972 autobiographical album by the English rock band the Who. In the liner notes for the Who's 1974 rarities collection Odds & Sods, guitarist and lead songwriter Pete Townshend said, "I had an idea once for a new album about the history of The Who called Rock Is Dead—Long Live Rock. That idea later blossomed into Quadrophenia." The sessions for the album spanned from 19 May to 6 June at Olympic Studios in London. Rock Is Dead—Long Live Rock was to be produced by the Who and Glyn Johns and scheduled for release in October 1972, but although the album was nearly completed (according to Townshend) the band felt as though it sounded too much like their 1971 LP Who's Next. Townshend later stated that Rock Is Dead—Long Live Rock was also going to be a TV special about the Who.

== Track listing ==
Proposed track listings, created by the band during the 1972 sessions for the album, are in existence. In addition, a tape of Pete Townshend's demos for the album was compiled. The songs are (including recording and release dates for the Who recordings where applicable):

1. "Relay" – Recorded on 26 May 1972, released as a single 25 November.
2. "Get Inside" – Probably not recorded by the Who. The demo was later released on the Quadrophenia box set of 2011.
3. "Women's Liberation" (AKA "Riot In The Female Jail") – Demo unofficially released on Pete Townshend's "The Genuine Scoop" 5-CD bootleg.
4. "Love, Reign o'er Me" – Recorded in May 1972, completed 8 June 1973 released on Quadrophenia on 18 October 1973, released as a single 27 October 1973.
5. "Long Live Rock" – Recorded 5 June 1972, first released on Odds and Sods in 1974, released as a single in November 1979.
6. "Is It In My Head?" – Recorded in May 1972, released on Quadrophenia on 18 October 1973.
7. "Put The Money Down" – Recorded 6 June 1972, vocals completed in 1974 and released on Odds and Sods.
8. "Can't You See I'm Easy" – Demo unofficially released on Pete Townshend's "The Genuine Scoop" 5-CD bootleg.
9. "Join Together With The Band" – Recorded on 22 May 1972, released as a single 16 June as "Join Together"

Also, "Ambition" was performed by Pete Townshend on an episode of In the Attic; he claimed the Who recorded a version during these sessions which was never released. It was originally intended to be released online in conjunction with the Quadrophenia box set, but was later omitted.

== Personnel ==
- Roger Daltrey: lead vocals
- Pete Townshend: guitar, piano, synthesizer, harmonica, Jew's harp, vocals
- John Entwistle: bass guitar, vocals
- Keith Moon: drums, percussion
