= I've Known No War =

1982 song by The Who

Song by the Who

from the album It's Hard
- Released: 4 September 1982
- Recorded: 1982
- Studio: Turn Up-Down Studio at Glyn Johns' home in Surrey, England
- Genre: Rock
- Length: 5:46
- Label: Polydor (UK); Warner Bros. (US original); MCA (US reissue)
- Songwriter: Pete Townshend
- Producer: Glyn Johns

Official audio
- "I've Known No War" on YouTube

"I've Known No War" is a song by the English rock band the Who, originally released on their tenth studio album, It's Hard (1982). Written by Pete Townshend, the song reflects personal thoughts on the Cold War, and contains lyrics referring to the end of the Second World War:

Galbraith took his pen to break down the men of the German Army defeated
On the nineteenth day of a spring day in May, Albert Speer was deleted
And as soon as the battle was over, I was born in victorious clover
And I've never been shot at or gassed never tortured or stabbed

And I'm sure – I'll never know war

Townshend felt confident about the song, even stating that he felt it was possibly one of the best tracks the Who ever did.

Parke Puterbaugh of Rolling Stone magazine stated that the song was the key to the album, as he wrote in his 1982 review of It's Hard:

'I've Known No War,' [is] a song that could become an anthem to our generation much the way 'Won't Get Fooled Again' did a decade ago. 'I've Known No War' is one conscientious objector's statement of defiant opposition, tempered by the realities of the present day. To wit, that a nuclear war, despite our best pacifistic inclinations, is in the hands of a few men who will simply decide to push a button, and that the ensuing annihilation will be sudden, certain and eternal.
