= Don't Let Go the Coat =

1981 single by the Who

Single by the Who

from the album Face Dances
- B-side: "You"
- Released: 1 May 1981
- Recorded: 1980
- Studio: Odyssey (London)
- Genre: Country rock
- Length: 3:44
- Label: Polydor (UK); Warner Bros. (US)
- Songwriter: Pete Townshend
- Producer: Bill Szymczyk

The Who singles chronology
"You Better You Bet" (1981)	"Don't Let Go the Coat" (1981)	"Athena" (1982)

Promo music video
- "Don't Let Go the Coat" on YouTube

"Don't Let Go the Coat" is a song written by Pete Townshend and first released on the Who's ninth studio album Face Dances (1981).

It was released as a single following up on the first single from Face Dances, "You Better You Bet", but did not achieve the same success, reaching number 47 in the UK and number 84 in the US. It has also been released on several compilation albums, and Pete Townshend himself released an alternate version of the song on his compilation album Another Scoop (1987).

== Music and lyrics ==
Several authors, including Stephen Thomas Erlewine, regard the lyrics of "Don't Let Go the Coat" as an ode to the Indian spiritual master Meher Baba. The title then refers to Meher Baba's charge that his disciples "hang fast to the hem of my robe," where the robe is a metaphor for his teachings. Alternatively, the song could refer to Pete Townshend's parents, who were the ones who would pick him up when Townshend descended into drugs and alcohol. But regardless, the song strikes themes of spiritual torment, fear of abandonment and the need to keep faith, beginning with the lines:

I can't be held responsible for blown behavior
I've lost all contact with my only saviour

Musically, "Don't Let Go the Coat" has a country rock flavor. Authors Steve Grantley and Alan Parker describe the guitar sound as being similar to that of the Pretenders, and note that Townshend's acoustic guitar solo has Spanish inflections.

== Music video ==
A music video for the song was produced in black and white, featuring the band and keyboardist John Bundrick playing onstage. The video played twice on MTV's first day of broadcast on 1 August 1981 as the 50th and 116th video to air on the channel. The Who made the video on the same set as their videos for "You Better You Bet" and "Another Tricky Day".

== Critical reception ==
Record World described the chorus as "nifty", Townshend's guitar solo as "tasteful" and Roger Daltrey's lead vocal as "gentle".

John Atkins acknowledges that the song is melodic, but claims that it is bland and notes that it has less energy than "You Better You Bet". Grantley and Parker, while praising the "pristine production" by Bill Szymczyk, note that the song "never really gets out of first gear." Chris Charlesworth asserts that lead vocalist Roger Daltrey's bravado is ill-suited to the song's confession of inadequacy and unworthiness. Erlewine, however, claims that "Don't Let Go the Coat" is "one of [Townshend's] better odes to Meher Baba."

== Other releases ==
"Don't Let Go the Coat" was included on The Ultimate Collection compilation album in some countries in 2002. A promotional video of the song appeared on Who's Better, Who's Best in 1988. A live video performance from 1981 was included on the DVD set Thirty Years of Maximum R&B Live. Townshend released a version of "Don't Let Go the Coat", with himself on lead vocals, on his compilation album Another Scoop (1987). Spin favorably contrasted this version with that of the Who, noting in particular Townshend's "newfound rock exuberance".

== Charts ==
Chart (1981)	Peak position
UK Singles Chart	47
US Billboard Hot 100	84
