= Ready Steady Who =

EP by the Who
- Released: 11 November 1966
- Recorded: 12 February – 11 October 1966
- Studios: IBC, Olympic and Pye, London
- Genre: Rock
- Length: 11:05
- Label: Reaction
- Producers: Kit Lambert; The Who

The Who chronology
My Generation (1965)	Ready Steady Who (1966)	A Quick One (1966)

The Who EP chronology
Ready Steady Who (1966)	Won't Get Fooled Again (1988)

Ready Steady Who is the first extended play (EP) by the English rock band the Who, released on 11 November 1966, about a month prior to their album A Quick One. The title refers to a Ready Steady Go! TV special the band had recently appeared in, but the EP contains different recordings from those performed on the TV show.

== EP profile ==
The record features two original songs by Pete Townshend on one side and three cover versions on the other, all of which were previously recorded by Jan and Dean; the theme from the Batman TV series, the duo's own "Bucket T", and the Regents' "Barbara Ann". As well as performing "Barbara Ann" with Jan Berry, Dean Torrence had suggested the Beach Boys record it and sang lead on their version (uncredited), and the Who's cover follows this arrangement. Despite what the title implies, the EP was not recorded on Ready Steady Go!; it is a studio recording and is unaffiliated with the television show.

All of the songs are available as bonus tracks on the 1995 reissue CD of A Quick One, except for "Circles", which differs from the version on the 2002 deluxe version of the My Generation LP, and can be found on Two's Missing.

The original EP credits the song "Batman" to Jan Berry, Don Altfeld (misspelled as "Altfield") and Fred Weider. However, the song was actually written by Neal Hefti, and the Who's cover version is of the original rather than Jan and Dean's reworking. The credit was corrected in the liner notes to the 1995 CD release of A Quick One.

An abridged version of "My Generation" was recorded for the EP but was not included. This version was later included as a bonus track on the 1995 remaster of A Quick One. The main difference between this version and the original is that it is heavily abridged and that the hail of feedback that ends the original serves as a transition into a chaotic rendition of Edward Elgar's "Land of Hope and Glory". In the album's liner notes the song is credited to both Townshend and Elgar.

== Recording ==
"Kit [Lambert] didn't slide naturally into the seat of producing the Who – he kind of arrived in the position of producing the Who because we desperately needed a producer."

— Pete Townshend, ZigZag magazine

Recording of the songs that would eventually end up on Ready Steady Who was sporadic during 1966, and sessions took place at three different studios. The first song to be recorded for the EP was a re-working of Townshend's composition "Circles", which had originally been recorded with Shel Talmy producing in January 1966. The session took place on 12 February 1966 at Olympic Studios on Carlton Street, London. Not having been notified about the session, the Who's manager Kit Lambert failed to attend, resulting in Townshend producing the recording. (Note: Though produced by Pete Townshend, the session was credited as being produced by the Who.) The session also produced the Who's fourth single, "Substitute", which reached number 5 in the Record Retailer chart. (Note: The re-recorded version of "Circles" saw a limited release as the B-side of "Substitute" on 4 March 1966. The single was only on sale for four days before being withdrawn because of a legal injunction by Shel Talmy.)

The Who would not return to the studio until June 1966, when on the 14th they worked on the backing tracks of two more Townshend compositions, "I'm a Boy" and "Disguises", at both IBC and Pye Studios. The recordings were specifically made for the band to mime on the finale of the BBC show A Whole Scene Going the following day, but the band liked the compositions enough to continue work on them. Because of a hectic tour schedule, the Who didn't get a chance to continue work on the songs until a nightly session between 31 July and 1 August, where they finished overdubs and mixing of the tracks. This session was at IBC Studios and marked the first time Kit Lambert produced the group.

Two of the EP's three cover songs were recorded during a session at IBC and Pye Studios with Lambert producing on 31 August 1966. The songs recorded during the session were "Barbara Ann" and "Batman", along with covers of Martha and the Vandellas and the Everly Brothers. Two distinct versions of "Batman" were recorded, one instrumental and one vocal, though only the former has been released. The final song recorded for Ready Steady Who, "Bucket 'T'", was taped on 11 October 1966 at IBC Studios. Swedish state television broadcaster Sveriges Television had arranged for one of their directors, Peter Goldmann, to film the Who's work in the studio during that day. (Note: The footage primarily depicts Entwistle's horn overdubs and the vocal track being recorded, along with an interview with Townshend. It was broadcast on Sweden's only national television channel SVT1 on 2 February 1967.)

== Release and reception ==
Professional ratings
Review scores
Source	Rating
AllMusic	3/5 stars

The EP was released on 11 November 1966 exclusively in the United Kingdom in mono only. It reached number one on the British EP chart, a position it would hold for four non-consecutive weeks on 17 December 1966, and once again on 7 January 1967.

As the EP was not issued in the United States at the time, the tracks were long considered rare collectibles. Although the tracks "Disguises" and "Bucket 'T'" saw a release on the 1968 compilation album Magic Bus: The Who on Tour, the remainder of the tracks would not see official US releases until the deluxe edition of A Quick One and Two's Missing.

"Bucket 'T'" was released as a single in several European countries. It fared well especially in Sweden, where it stayed on the charts for seven weeks, and peaked at number one for a week in February 1967.

Upon its release, it garnered mixed to positive reviews. In a retrospective review, AllMusic critic Richie Unterberger states that "it seemed undecided as to whether it was a joke cover record, or a home for leftovers" and thought that "it ended up a little bit of both".

== Track listing ==
Side 1
No.	Title	Writer(s)	Length
1.	"Disguises"	Pete Townshend	3:10
2.	"Circles"	Townshend	2:27

Side 2
No.	Title	Writer(s)	Length
1.	"Batman"	Neal Hefti, erroneously credited to Jan Berry, Don Altfeld, Fred Weider	1:22
2.	"Bucket 'T'"	Altfeld, Roger Christian, Dean Torrence	2:07
3.	"Barbara Ann"	Fred Fassert	1:59

== Personnel ==
- Roger Daltrey – vocals
- Pete Townshend – electric guitar, vocals
- John Entwistle – bass, French horn, vocals
- Keith Moon – drums, vocals

== Charts ==
Weekly chart performance for Ready Steady Who
Chart (1966–67)	Peak position
UK Melody Maker Singles chart	44
UK New Musical Express Singles chart	30
UK Record Retailer EP chart	1
