= Circles (The Who song) =

Song by the Who

Song by the Who

from the EP Ready Steady Who
- Released: 4 March 1966
- Recorded: 12–13 January 1966
- Genre: Power pop
- Label: Reaction ("Substitute" B-side UK single release); Decca (The Who Sings My Generation US release); Brunswick 05956 (Unreleased single)
- Songwriter: Pete Townshend
- Producers: Shel Talmy, the Who

"Circles" (also released as "Circles (Instant Party)", "Instant Party (Circles)" and "Instant Party") is a song by the English rock band the Who. The song, initially planned to be a Who single, saw a complicated release history. There are versions produced by the Who and by Shel Talmy.

== Background ==
"Circles" was written as an attempt to find a different sound after the band's debut album, My Generation. Upon finding out from Pete Townshend that bassist John Entwistle could play trumpet, the band's manager, Kit Lambert, decided to allow the band to try creating a song featuring Entwistle's horns:

When we recorded our first LP and wanted a bit of a different sound, Pete told our manager, Kit Lambert, that I could play trumpet. He thought Pete was joking at first but then said he'd give it a try. I showed him I could play the trumpet and in the end we used French horn.

== Release ==
"Circles", backed with "Instant Party Mixture", was originally planned for release as the follow-up single to the band's smash hit "My Generation", on the Brunswick label, in February 1966. The tracks were recorded at IBC Studios on January 11th, and the UK music press announced the upcoming single the following week. However, the band secretly broke their contract with producer Shel Talmy soon after these recordings, and re-recorded the song on February 4th, at Olympic Studios as the B-side to their new UK single "Substitute", also recorded this day. To get Talmy in court as soon as possible, and to ensure the new record could be sold, "Circles" was chosen as the B-side so that Talmy could claim breach of copyright. However, after the initial batch of singles had been pressed, management decided to repress the single with the name "Instant Party" as the B-side, in the hope that only copies with "Circles" listed would be withdrawn, if any court action would demand so. This in effect would mean Substitute would still be on sale in shops, as it was hoped nobody would notice that 'Instant Party' was actually the same song.

Talmy quickly took legal action against the band for breaking their contract with him, as well as breach of contract over the use of a song he had originally produced for them. This led to the court not only stopping all sales of the single, regardless of the B-side label, but also placing a recording ban on the Who until the end of the proceedings, meaning the single could not be sold. Management had not anticipated this and were shocked, as the lack of sales over the next few days could prove costly to its chart success.

This prompted Kit Lambert or Robert Stigwood to ask Ginger Baker if his band had any instrumentals recorded that they could use, to get around the ban. They had, and he sold the untitled track for £500. The following week, Substitute was back on sale with the now named "Waltz for a Pig", the instrumental by the Graham Bond Organisation on the B-side, credited to the Who Orchestra. The court action was settled on 25 March. Townshend later said of the legal action Talmy took against the group:

We did two versions of "Circles", which were both identical because they were both copies of my demo. Shel [Talmy] put in a High Court injunction, saying there was copyright in the recording. In other words, if you're a record producer and you produce a song with a group, and you make a creative contribution, then you own that sound... He took it to the high-court judge and he said things like 'And then on bar thirty-six I suggested to the lead guitarist that he play a diminuendo, forget the adagio, and play thirty-six bars modulating to the key of E flat,' which was all total bullshit – he used to fall asleep at the desk...

After the ban was lifted, all three versions of the single – with "Circles" / "Instant Party" on the B-side as well as the new "Waltz for a Pig" – could be found in stores. It would appear that "Waltz" was the most common found copy, with 'Circles' being the rarest. Talmy decided to react to the band's upcoming releases over the next year, by quickly releasing 'new' Who singles the same day as the bands 'Official' singles, by taking tracks from the 'My Generation' album in the hope of taking over sales.

The first version of the song was included by Talmy as the closing track on their first US album The Who Sings My Generation, substituting "I'm a Man". The second version of "Circles" was also released on the band's EP, Ready Steady Who in November 1966, as well as on some European releases as the B-side to "Dogs". This version of the song did not see an official US release until the 1987 rarities album Two's Missing. When Substitute was released as a single in the US, the only B-side was "Waltz for a Pig".

A home demo version recorded by Townshend appeared on his 1983 solo compilation release Scoop.

The song "Instant Party Mixture", which was originally meant to be the B-side to "Circles", was finally released as a bonus track on the 2002 reissue of the My Generation album.

== Covers ==
In 1966, the English band the Fleur de Lys released their version (Immediate Records IM032) produced by Glyn Johns. The song was also covered and released as a B-side in 1992 by Cell.
