= Phases (The Who album) =

Box set by the Who
- Released: May 1981
- Recorded: 1964–1978
- Genre: Rock
- Length: 424:30
- Label: Polydor

The Who chronology
Face Dances (1981)	Phases (1981)	Hooligans (1981)

Phases is a box set compiling the first eight studio albums by the English rock band the Who, as well as the Live at Leeds album, in LP form. This box set was released in the United Kingdom and West Germany.

== Track listing ==
All albums are identical to their initial United Kingdom releases.

1. My Generation
2. A Quick One
3. The Who Sell Out
4. Tommy
5. Live at Leeds
6. Who's Next
7. Quadrophenia
8. The Who by Numbers
9. Who Are You
