= Athena (song) =

Song by The Who

Single by the Who

from the album It's Hard
- B-side: "A Man Is a Man" (UK); "It's Your Turn" (US)
- Released: August 1982
- Recorded: June 1982
- Studio: Turn Up-Down Studio at Glyn Johns' home in Surrey, England
- Genre: Rock
- Length: 3:46
- Label: Polydor (UK); Warner Bros. (US)
- Songwriter: Pete Townshend
- Producer: Glyn Johns

The Who singles chronology
"Don't Let Go the Coat" (1981)	"Athena" (1982)	"Eminence Front" (1982)

"Athena" (the working title being "Theresa") is a song written by Pete Townshend and recorded by the Who. It appears as the first track on the band's tenth studio album It's Hard, released in 1982. Written for actress Theresa Russell, the song was the first single from It's Hard. The single was a moderate success, entering the US Billboard Hot 100 on 4 September, reaching No. 28 (their final top 40 hit in the US) and the UK Singles Charts on 2 October, reaching No. 40.

== Background ==
"Athena" was written by Pete Townshend after an encounter with the American actress Theresa Russell. After seeing a Pink Floyd performance on their The Wall Tour, with Russell and her friend, Bill Minkin, Townshend was rejected by the actress when he attempted to romance her. Townshend said of the incident:

The song was written after I had been to see The Wall with my friend Bill Minkin and the actress Theresa Russell who was about to marry the film director Nic Roeg with whom I hoped to work on a new version of Lifehouse. I got drunk as usual, but I had taken my first line of cocaine that very evening before meeting her and decided I was in love. When I came to do the vocal on the following day [Feb. 15, 1980] I was really out of my mind with frustration and grief because she didn't reciprocate.

Under the working title "Theresa", the song's name was changed to "Athena". Despite this alteration, Townshend still felt the song was too personal, claiming, "It was just too revealing." Roger Daltrey, however, disliked the song for this change.

No, I never liked that song ["Athena"]. It's a great record. I think what happened with that song, it was originally called "Theresa" and then Pete was talking to me about Nick Roeg's girlfriend and how he fancied her, and that song was written about her - but then it changed into 'She's a bomb' and I think I've got a psychological problem with it. I listened to it on the record the other day, and it's a great record; there's so much energy on that thing but I still don't think there's a center to that song. The fact that he changed the title in that and didn't stick to what it was supposed to be lost its center to me.

— Roger Daltrey, News of the World, 2010

A demo for the original "Theresa" was first recorded and presented to the Who by Pete Townshend during the Face Dances sessions. However, the song was not used until It's Hard.

On "Athena" Roger Daltrey and Townshend share lead vocals. John Entwistle also adds horns to the track. Kenney Jones said of his drumming on the song, "I had a nice time playing that song. I got to have some fun with its arrangement."

== Release ==
"Athena" was released as the first single from It's Hard, backed with "A Man Is a Man" in Britain and "It's Your Turn" in America. The single achieved moderate chart success, reaching #3 on the US Billboard Mainstream Rock and number 28 on the US Billboard Hot 100, but received good airplay on album-oriented rock and later classic rock radio formats. "Athena" also reached number 40 on the UK Singles Chart, making it both the band's last UK and US top 40 single. The single also reached number five in Canada.

Billboard described it as a "comparatively lilting love song set to a fast but fluid track" and said it was "one of the Who's most melodic and warmhearted" songs.

In addition to appearing on It's Hard, "Athena" also was released on both The Ultimate Collection (2002) [British edition, not the American edition], and the deluxe edition of The Who Hits 50! (2014) compilation albums.

== Live performances ==
The Who only played "Athena" a total of ten times on the band's 1982 tour, and have not played the song again ever since.

On 30 October 2017, at Ruth Eckerd Hall in Clearwater, Florida, Roger Daltrey performed "Athena" live for the first time in 35 years.
