= Icon (album series) =

Series of compilation albums

Icon is a series of compilation albums released by Universal Music Enterprises, a division of Universal Music Group, the largest music publisher in the world.

The series began in 2010. Among the artists whose recordings have been included are Billy Ray Cyrus, Cher, Kenny Rogers, Joe Cocker, Michael Jackson, Nirvana and Queen. It also includes artists by the former EMI Records and Capitol Records labels once they were absorbed by UMG in 2013.

== Albums ==
=== Mainstream ===
- Icon (The Beach Boys album) (2013)
- Icon (Billy Currington album) (2011)
- Icon (Billy Ray Cyrus album) (2011)
- Icon (Blink-182 album) (2013)
- Icon (Bryan Adams album) (2010)
- Icon (Cher album) (2011)
- Icon (Captain & Tennille album) (2013)
- Icon (Chris LeDoux album) (2013)
- Icon (Eric Clapton album) (2011)
- Icon (Fall Out Boy album) (2012)
- Icon (Gary Allan album) (2012)
- Icon (George Strait album) (2011)
- Icon: Number Ones (Janet Jackson album; 2010)
- Icon (Ja Rule album), (2012)
- Icon (Joe Cocker album) (2011)
- Icon (John Lennon album) (2014)
- Icon (Josh Turner album) (2011)
- Icon (Limp Bizkit album) (2011)
- Icon (Liz Phair album) (2014)
- Icon (Luba album) (2014)
- Icon (Lynyrd Skynyrd album) (2010)
- Icon (Megadeth album) (2014)
- Icon (Mike Oldfield album) (2012)
- Icon (New Found Glory album) (2013)
- Icon (Nirvana album) (2010)
- Icon (Paula Abdul album) (2013)
- Icon (Chanté Moore album) (2014)
- Icon: Best of Puddle of Mudd (2010)
- Icon (Queen album) (2013)
- Icon (Reba McEntire album) (2014)
- Icon (Ringo Starr album) (2014)
- Icon (Rush album) (2010)
- Icon 2 (Rush album) (2011)
- Icon (Sheryl Crow album) (2011)
- Icon (Tanya Tucker album) (2014)
- Icon (The Tea Party album) (2014)
- Icon (Thin Lizzy album) (2011)
- Icon (Vince Gill album) (2010)
- Icon (Village People album) (2014)
- Icon (Whitesnake album) (2015)
- Icon 2 (The Who album) (2011)

=== Reissues ===
- Icon: Tough Love: Best of the Ballads (Aerosmith)
- Icon: Timeless...The Musical Legacy (Badfinger)
- Icon: What Hits!? (Red Hot Chili Peppers)
- Icon: Show Us Your Hits (The Bloodhound Gang)
- Icon (ABBA album) (2010), a reissue of 20th Century Masters – The Millennium Collection: The Best of ABBA
- Icon (KISS album) (2010) a reissue of 20th Century Masters – The Millennium Collection: The Best of Kiss
- Icon (No Doubt album) (2010), a reissue of The Singles 1992–2003
- Icon (The Who album) (2011), a reissue of 20th Century Masters – The Millennium Collection: The Best of the Who
- Icon (Michael Jackson album) (2012), a reissue of 20th Century Masters – The Millennium Collection: The Best of Michael Jackson

=== Capitol CMG releases ===
Capitol Christian Music Group, a division of Universal Music Group, released 23 albums for the Icon series. 11 releases occurred in 2013, while another 12 occurred in 2014:

- Icon: Aaron Neville (2013)
- Icon: Amy Grant (2013)
- Icon: Andy Griffith (2014)
- Icon: Anthony Burger (Live) (2014)
- Icon: BeBe and CeCe Winans (2014)
- Icon: CeCe Winans (2013)
- Icon: Gaither Vocal Band (2013)
- Icon: Hawk Nelson (2014)
- Icon: Jeremy Camp (2013)
- Icon: Keith Green (2013)
- Icon: KJ-52 (2014)
- Icon: Michael Card (2014)
- Icon: Newsboys (2013)
- Icon: Nichole Nordeman (2013)
- Icon: Phillips, Craig & Dean (2013)
- Icon: Rebecca St. James (2014)
- Icon: Steven Curtis Chapman (2013)
- Icon: Stryper (2014)
- Icon: The Goodmans (2014)
- Icon: The Mighty Clouds of Joy (2014)
- Icon: The O.C. Supertones (2014)
- Icon: Underoath (2014)
- Icon: Vanessa Bell Armstrong (2014)

=== Geffen Records releases ===
- Icon: Three Dog Night (2010)
- Icon: Neil Diamond (2010)
- Icon: The Mamas & The Papas (2011)
- Icon: Etta James (2011)
- Icon: B.B. King (2011)
- Icon: John Lee Hooker (2011)
- Icon: Muddy Waters (2011)
- Icon: Buddy Guy (2011)
- Icon: Chuck Berry (2011)
- Icon: Buddy Holly (2011)
