= Who's Missing (album) =

1985 album

Compilation album by the Who
- Released: November 1985
- Recorded: 1965–1971
- Genre: Rock
- Length: 41:07
- Label: MCA

The Who chronology
The Who Collection (1985)	Who's Missing (1985)	Two's Missing (1987)

Who's Missing is a compilation of rare and previously unreleased songs by the English rock band the Who. Its second part, Two's Missing, was released in April 1987.

The CD was reissued in Japan on 24 December 2011 with additional bonus tracks drawn from the Japanese only bonus disc for Then and Now, as a 2-CD set together with Two's Missing. The album was remastered by Jon Astley from the original analog master tapes.

== Critical reception ==
Professional ratings
Review scores
Source	Rating
AllMusic	3/5 stars
The Encyclopedia of Popular Music	2/5 stars
MusicHound	3/5

Reviewing for AllMusic critic Richie Unterberger wrote of the album: "Some of these [songs] are really good: the raucous 1965 cover of James Brown's 'Shout and Shimmy,' 'Heaven and Hell' (one of John Entwistle's better tunes), the 45 version of 'Mary Anne with the Shaky Hand,' the obscure Roger Daltrey tune 'Here for More.' Other cuts are pretty peripheral, like the '65 R&B version of 'Lubie (Come Back Home),' or the live version of 'Bargain.'"

== Track listing ==
Side one
No.	Title	Writer(s)	Length
1.	"Shout and Shimmy" (B-Side from UK versions of The Who – "My Generation")	James Brown	3:18
2.	"Leaving Here" (First official release)	Holland-Dozier-Holland	2:50
3.	"Anytime You Want Me" (B-side from US versions of The Who – "Anyway Anyhow Anywhere")	Jerry Ragovoy, Garnet Mimms	2:36
4.	"Lubie (Come Back Home)" (Cover of the '64 version of "Louie – Go Home" by Paul Revere & The Raiders. First official release)	Paul Revere, Mark Lindsay	3:40
5.	"Barbara Ann" (From Who – "Ready Steady Who")	Fred Fassert	2:01
6.	"I'm a Boy" (From The Who – "I'm A Boy"; original single mix with John Entwistle's French horn arrangement)	Pete Townshend	2:38
7.	"Mary Anne with the Shaky Hand" (From US versions of The Who – "I Can See for Miles"; original US single mono mix)	Townshend	3:17

Side two
No.	Title	Writer(s)	Length
1.	"Heaven and Hell" (B-side from US versions of The Who – "Summertime Blues")	John Entwistle	3:33
2.	"Here for More" (B-side from UK & US versions of The Who – "The Seeker")	Roger Daltrey	2:27
3.	"I Don't Even Know Myself" (B-side from UK & US versions of The Who – "Won't Get Fooled Again")	Townshend	4:59
4.	"When I Was a Boy" (B-side from The Who – "Let's See Action")	Entwistle	3:30
5.	"Bargain" (Live 1972. First official release)	Townshend	6:18

Japanese CD Reissue Bonus Tracks
No.	Title	Writer(s)	Length
13.	"Doctor, Doctor" (mono)	Entwistle	3:02
14.	"Someone's Coming"	Entwistle	2:32
15.	"Dr. Jekyll and Mr. Hyde" (mono)	Entwistle	2:39
16.	"Fortune Teller"	Naomi Neville	2:23
17.	"Postcard" (cancelled EP version)	Entwistle	3:27
18.	"Baby Don't You Do It" (live in San Francisco, California, 1971)	Holland-Dozier-Holland	9:38

== Artwork ==
The album cover design is by Richard Evans and is an acknowledgement of Peter Blake's Got a Girl (1960–61).
