= The Quiet One (song) =

Song by the Who

from the album Face Dances
- Released: 16 March 1981
- Recorded: July–December 1980
- Studio: Odyssey (London)
- Genre: Rock
- Length: 3:10
- Label: Polydor; Warner Bros.
- Songwriter: John Entwistle
- Producer: Bill Szymczyk

Official audio
- "The Quiet One" on YouTube

"The Quiet One" is a song by the English rock band the Who, written by bassist John Entwistle. It is one of two Entwistle contributions to the Who's first studio album without Keith Moon, Face Dances (1981). Entwistle's other contribution to Face Dances is "You", with Roger Daltrey on lead vocals.

"The Quiet One" is also a B-side for the first single from Face Dances, "You Better You Bet".

"You Better You Bet" reached number 18 on the US Billboard Hot 100, number 1 on the Billboard Top (Rock) Tracks, and number 9 in the UK.

The song was written by Entwistle to replace his song "My Wife" (from 1971's Who's Next) on tour, and he did so for the years of 1981 and the Who's Tour of 1982. However, in following tours, this song was never played again; "My Wife" was brought back.

Entwistle said about the song:

It's me trying to explain that I'm not really quiet. I started off being quiet and that's the pigeon hole I've been stuck in all these years. It started when I heard Kenney [Jones] playing a drum riff and I thought 'that would be really great for a song and give Kenney a chance to play that on stage.' So I got Kenney to put down about three minutes of that and I worked along with it and came up with the chorus of 'The Quiet One.' I wrote 'Quiet One' especially to replace 'My Wife' onstage. I had gotten tired of singing that and 'Boris the Spider.'

A live version of "The Quiet One" appears on a video The Who Live at Shea Stadium recorded on 13 October 1982. Audio recording of the song from the same concert was also released as a bonus track on the Who album Face Dances in 1997. Another live version of the song is featured on the DVD/double CD Live from Toronto capturing the Who's Farewell Concert on 17 December 1982, released in 2007.
