= Relay (song) =

Single by the Who
- B-side: "Waspman"
- Released: 25 November 1972 (US); 22 December 1972 (UK)
- Recorded: 26 May 1972
- Studio: Olympic Studios (Barnes, London)
- Genre: Rock; funk rock
- Length: 3:42 (US); 3:49 (UK)
- Label: Track; Decca (US); Track; Polydor (UK)
- Songwriter: Pete Townshend
- Producer: The Who

The Who singles chronology
"Join Together" (1972)	"Relay" (1972)	"5:15" (1973)

"Relay" (titled "The Relay" in the United States) is a song written by Pete Townshend, the guitarist of the Who, for the band's aborted Lifehouse project. The song was also released as a moderately successful single in 1972. It was also the last non-album single by the Who until "Real Good Looking Boy", 32 years later.

== Background ==
"Relay" was originally written as part of the unfinished Lifehouse rock opera, however, like "Join Together", it was not written until 1972, when Pete Townshend revisited the project, at Roger Daltrey's suggestion. In 1972, the song was resurrected to be used in Rock Is Dead—Long Live Rock!, another abandoned Who album that was to be released in 1972.

The song was recorded during the same sessions as "Join Together" and a demo of "Long Live Rock" in May 1972.

"Relay" was released as a single in late 1972, backed with the Keith Moon-penned track, "Waspman". The single charted in the Top 40 in both the UK and US, reaching No. 21 in the United Kingdom and No. 39 on the Billboard Hot 100 (and No. 33 on Cashbox). The single was the last of three singles relating to Lifehouse (but which did not appear on Who's Next), the others being "Let's See Action" and "Join Together".

Lead singer Roger Daltrey spoke positively of the song, saying "I love 'Relay'". Pete Townshend, however, felt that it sounded too similar to the band's other releases. He said of this:

I've got to get a new act together for the Who... we've got to get something fresh.

— Pete Townshend, Melody Maker

=== Live and alternate versions ===
In order to promote the single, "Relay" was performed on two British television shows, Russell Harty Plus and The Old Grey Whistle Test, in early 1973.

"Relay" was performed throughout the Who's 1972 tour, but was dropped from the setlist afterwards, and would not return until after Keith Moon's death; it was performed twice in the 1979 tour (once as an encore, once as a snippet) and frequently through the 1980 tour, before returning to the full setlist in 2000 and 2002. However, it was then dropped again until 2006, and remained in the setlist through 2009. Live performances from 2000 onwards were often performed in an extended format, frequently exceeding seven minutes.

== Lyrics and music ==
"Relay" begins with a strong guitar line fed through the sample and hold-controlled VCF of an ARP-2600 synthesiser, which persists throughout the song. It also features an ordinary electric guitar and acoustic guitar. Intended to feature near the end of Lifehouse, "Relay" is thought to refer to the final setting up of and spreading the word about the Lifehouse concert. The fictional Relay bears strong similarities to the modern Internet, and as such in concerts in the 21st century, Townshend introduces the song as being about the Internet.

Record World said that it "begins with an Isaac Hayes sound and breaks into a heavy rocker again evincing Townshend's humanistic consciousness."

== Release history ==
In addition to being released as a single in 1972, "Relay" has appeared on a number of albums. In order of release:

- Hooligans (labelled as "The Relay")
- Who's Greatest Hits
- Rarities Volume II
- The Who Collection
- Thirty Years of Maximum R&B
- BBC Sessions
- Live at the Royal Albert Hall/The Who & Special Guests: Live at the Royal Albert Hall
- Live in Boston
- The Who Hits 50!

== Chart performance ==
Chart (1972–1973)	Peak position
Belgium (Ultratop 50 Wallonia)	11
Canada (RPM)	50
Netherlands (Dutch Top 40)	29
UK Singles (OCC)	21
US Billboard Hot 100	39
West Germany (Media Control)	28
