= David Tindle =

British painter (born 1932)

- Born: 29 April 1932 (age 94); Huddersfield, Yorkshire, England
- Education: Coventry School of Art
- Known for: Painting

David Tindle RA (born 29 April 1932) is a British painter who was made a Royal Academician in 1979. He is a Fellow of St Edmund Hall where several of his paintings are in the Senior Common Room. In the Old Dining Hall hangs his portrait of the former Principal Justin Gosling. He is now living in Santa Maria del Giudice, near Lucca, in Italy.

== Early life ==
David Tindle was born 29 April 1932, in Huddersfield, Yorkshire. He studied at Coventry School of Art from 1945 to 1947.

== Teaching career ==
- 1959 – 1972 Tutor, Hornsey College of Art and Byam Shaw School of Art
- 1972 – 1983 Tutor, Royal College of Art
- 1985 – 1987 Ruskin Master of Drawing, Oxford University
