= Tim Gorman =

American musician (born 1952)

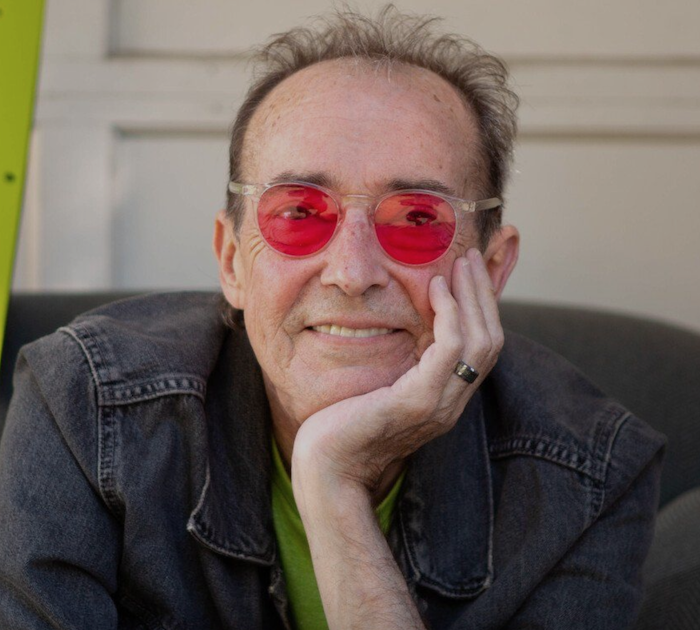
- Gorman in 2020

Background information
- Born: June 12, 1952; San Francisco, California, U.S.
- Died: March 26, 2025 (aged 72) Portland, Oregon, U.S.
- Education: University of Portland
- Genres: Rock; hard rock
- Occupations: Musician; composer; arranger; record producer
- Instruments: Keyboards; synthesizer; organ
- Years active: 1975–2016

Tim Gorman (June 12, 1952 – March 26, 2025) was an American pianist, composer, arranger and record producer. Gorman studied music composition at the University of Portland in Oregon, under Philippe De La Mare, himself a former student of Nadia Boulanger.

== Biography ==
Gorman graduated in 1974 and went on to work as a session musician, most notably from the 1980s until the present. His work along the way included collaborations with Duane Eddy, Paul Kantner, the Rolling Stones and the Who, and Jefferson Starship.

Gorman took part in the recording of the Who's album It's Hard and the subsequent tour in 1982.

In 1984, he was the keyboardist in The V.U. (sometimes called The View) Phoenix Rising album together with Kevin Chalfant (vocals), Ross Valory (bass guitar), Prairie Prince (drums) and Steff Burns (guitars), all of them musicians whose complete list of acts in which they were involved needed another specific page. Valory and Chalfant later joined again in The Storm which included other former Journey members plus Josh Ramos, a guest guitarist in the V.U. album. Phoenix Rising songs are dated 1984 but the album never saw the light till it was rescued and published by Frontiers in 2000.

His work with Paul Kantner goes back to the KBC Band during 1985 to 1987. He then took part in the Jefferson Airplane reunion in 1989. Gorman was one of several keyboardists on the reunion album and played live with the Airplane in the supporting tour. He was then a member of Kantner's band Wooden Ships, along with guitarist Mark "Slick" Aguilar in 1991 and 1992. Wooden Ships was joined on some of its later gigs by singer Darby Gould (formerly of World Entertainment War) and Airplane/Hot Tuna bassist Jack Casady.

This soon became the core line-up for the new incarnation of Jefferson Starship with the addition of drummer Prairie Prince and fiddler Papa John Creach, later rejoined by former Airplane co-founder Marty Balin. Gorman stayed with Jefferson Starship as a permanent member until 1995, appearing on the live album Deep Space / Virgin Sky and playing on two tracks for the studio album Windows of Heaven. He has teamed again with them occasionally on some of the Galactic Family Reunion concerts in 2006.

== Discography ==
=== The Who ===
- It's Hard [Tracks 5, 6, 8, 9 & 13-16] (1982)

- All subsequent studio version releases of "Eminence Front"

- Who's Last (1984)
- Thirty Years of Maximum R&B [Disc 4, tracks 17-18] (1994)
- Classical Daydreams (1996)
- Celtic Loop (1996)
- Live from Toronto (2006)
- Cowboy (1996)
