= Magic Bus: The Who on Tour =

Compilation album by the Who
- Released: September 1968
- Recorded: 1966–68
- Genres: Rock; pop
- Length: 30:48
- Label: Decca
- Producer: Kit Lambert

The Who US chronology
The Who Sell Out (1967)	Magic Bus: The Who on Tour (1968)	Tommy (1969)

Singles from Magic Bus: The Who on Tour
- 1. "Magic Bus" / "Someone's Coming" Released: 11 October 1968

Magic Bus: The Who on Tour is a compilation album by the English rock band the Who. It was released as the band's fourth album in the United States by Decca in September 1968 to capitalize on the success of their single of the same name. It is a compilation album of previously released material, and was not issued in the UK, although the album was also released at approximately the same time in Canada. It peaked at #39 on the Billboard 200.

The somewhat deceptive title implies that the songs were recorded live, but all recordings are studio tracks. The track list duplicates a few songs from the second and third US albums, but also contains single and EP tracks that were previously unavailable on a US album.

Members of the group (Pete Townshend in particular) have frequently expressed their dislike of this release. When the cover pictures were taken the group was not made aware by Decca that the shots would be used for a US album. Immediately following the modest success of this album, a similar but unrelated Who compilation, Direct Hits, was released in the UK by Track Records.

In 1974, the album was re-issued by MCA Records in the US and Canada as part of a budget-priced double album set which also included the 1966 US debut, The Who Sings My Generation. The reissue peaked at #185 on the Billboard 200. It was reissued on Compact disc by MCA Records in the 1980s, but it was not included among the remastered CD editions that were released in the 1990s.

Professional ratings
Review scores
Source	Rating
AllMusic	3/5 stars
The Encyclopedia of Popular Music	3/5 stars
MusicHound	2.5/5
Rolling Stone	(unfavourable)
The Rolling Stone Album Guide	2/5 stars

== Track listing ==
All songs written by Pete Townshend except where noted.

Side one
No.	Title	Writer(s)	Original release	Length
1.	"Disguises" (mono)		Ready Steady Who (EP), 1966	3:14
2.	"Run Run Run" (stereo)		A Quick One, 1966	2:44
3.	"Dr. Jekyll and Mr. Hyde" (mono)	John Entwistle	UK B-side of "Magic Bus", 1968	2:27
4.	"I Can't Reach You" (stereo)		The Who Sell Out, 1967	3:05
5.	"Our Love Was, Is" (stereo)		The Who Sell Out	3:09
6.	"Call Me Lightning" (mono)		UK B-side of "Dogs", 1968	2:25

Side two
No.	Title	Writer(s)	...	Length
7.	"Magic Bus" (American stereo version)		Single A-side	3:21
8.	"Someone's Coming" (mono)	Entwistle	UK B-side of "I Can See for Miles", US B-side of "Magic Bus"	2:33
9.	"Doctor, Doctor" (mono)	Entwistle	B-side of "Pictures of Lily", 1967	3:02
10.	"Bucket T" (mono)	Don Altfeld, Roger Christian, Dean Torrence	Ready Steady Who	2:11
11.	"Pictures of Lily" (mono)		Single A-side	2:43

== Personnel ==
The Who

- Roger Daltrey – lead vocals, harmonica
- Pete Townshend – backing vocals, electric guitar, acoustic guitar on "Magic Bus", lead vocals on "I Can't Reach You" and "Our Love Was, Is"
- John Entwistle – bass guitar, backing vocals, lead vocal on "Doctor Doctor" and "Dr. Jekyll and Mr. Hyde".
- Keith Moon – drums, backing vocals, lead vocal on "Bucket T"
