= Call Me Lightning (band) =

American indie rock band

- Origin: Milwaukee, Wisconsin, U.S.
- Genre: Indie rock
- Labels: Revelation; Frenchkiss; 25 Diamonds
- Website: callmelightning

Call Me Lightning is an American indie rock band from Milwaukee, Wisconsin, United States. The band's name is taken from the 1968 song "Call Me Lightning" by The Who. The band cites Minutemen as one of its foremost influences. The group released its first album, The Trouble We're In, on Revelation Records in 2004. In 2007, it released a second album, Soft Skeletons, on Frenchkiss Records. This was recorded at Steve Albini's Chicago studio, Electrical Audio. The band has received significant press coverage for both albums. In March 2007, the band was featured in Spin.

Their fourth LP, Human Hell, was released on the vinyl-only record label 25 Diamonds on March 1, 2014.

== Members ==
Current

- Nathan Lilley - vocals, guitar
- Tyler Chicorel - bass guitar
- Shane Hochstetler - percussion

Former

- Bill Kutsch - bass guitar, keyboards
- Kris Maedke-Russell - bass guitar

== Discography ==
- The Trouble We're In (Revelation Records, 2004)
- Soft Skeletons (Frenchkiss Records, 2007)
- Split 7" with Get Rad (Scenester Credentials, 2008)
- When I Am Gone My Blood Will Be Free (Dusty Medical Records, 2010)
- Human Hell (25 Diamonds 1 March 2014)
