= It's Hard =

Studio album by the Who
- Released: 4 September 1982
- Recorded: June 1982
- Studios: Turn Up-Down Studio at Glyn Johns' home in Surrey, England
- Genres: Rock; hard rock
- Length: 46:36
- Labels: Polydor; Warner Bros.
- Producer: Glyn Johns

The Who chronology
Hooligans (1981)	It's Hard (1982)	Who's Greatest Hits (1983)

Singles from It's Hard
- 1. "Athena" Released: August 1982; 2. "Eminence Front" Released: December 1982; 3. "It's Hard" Released: February 1983

It's Hard is the tenth studio album by the English rock band the Who. Released in September 1982, it was the final Who album to feature bassist John Entwistle, who died in 2002. It was also the second and final Who studio album with drummer Kenney Jones, as well as the last to be released on Warner Bros. Records in the US. It was released on Polydor Records in the UK, peaking at No. 11, and on Warner Bros. in the US where it peaked at No. 8 on the Billboard Pop Albums chart. The US rights to both this album and Face Dances subsequently reverted to the band, who then licensed them to MCA Records (later Geffen Records, itself once distributed by WB) for reissue. The album achieved gold status by the RIAA in the US in November 1982. It was their last album for over two decades until Endless Wire in 2006.

== Artwork ==
The album cover, designed and photographed by Graham Hughes, depicts a young boy playing an Atari Space Duel arcade game. This is intended as a reference to the song "Pinball Wizard", from the album Tommy.

== Background ==
The first track on the album, "Athena", peaked at No. 28 on the Billboard Pop Singles chart. "Dangerous", "It's Your Turn" and "One at a Time" were written by Entwistle, but he only sang lead vocals on "One at a Time" with Daltrey singing lead on the two others.

In 1997, MCA Records re-released the album with new mixes for several songs, correcting problems evident in the original mixes for "Athena" and "Eminence Front".

In 1994, Daltrey said "It's Hard should never have been released" and that he also had arguments with Townshend over the release of the album. He stated the record company wanted them to make a new record, then do a tour for the album, so in many ways they were forced to release it. In a 1985 interview, Townshend said, "Face Dances and It’s Hard were made by a band who were very unsure about whether or not they wanted to be making a record, and I think that’s a terrible doubt."

Alternate takes exist of "Eminence Front" featuring Roger Daltrey on lead vocals and "One Life's Enough" featuring Pete Townshend on lead vocals.

"I've Known No War" features the orchestra arrangement from the 1979 Quadrophenia film version of "I've Had Enough".

== Critical reception ==
Professional ratings
Review scores
Source	Rating
AllMusic	2/5 stars
Robert Christgau	C
The Encyclopedia of Popular Music	2/5 stars
MusicHound	1/5 stars
Rolling Stone	5/5 stars
The Rolling Stone Album Guide	2.5/5 stars

Critical reviews on its release in 1982 were polarized. Parke Puterbaugh of Rolling Stone gave it the magazine's highest rating (5 stars) and commented that it was "their most vital and coherent album since [the 1971 album] Who's Next". Puterbaugh also proclaimed that the song "I've Known No War" was "a song that could become an anthem to our generation much the way 'Won't Get Fooled Again' did a decade ago." Robert Christgau, on the other hand, icily disparaged the "prolix" nature and "operatic pretensions" of Townshend's musical ideas, as well as his "book-club poetry". Stephen Thomas Erlewine of AllMusic considered the album to be an "undistinguished final effort" with "few memorable melodies and little energy".

== Live performances ==
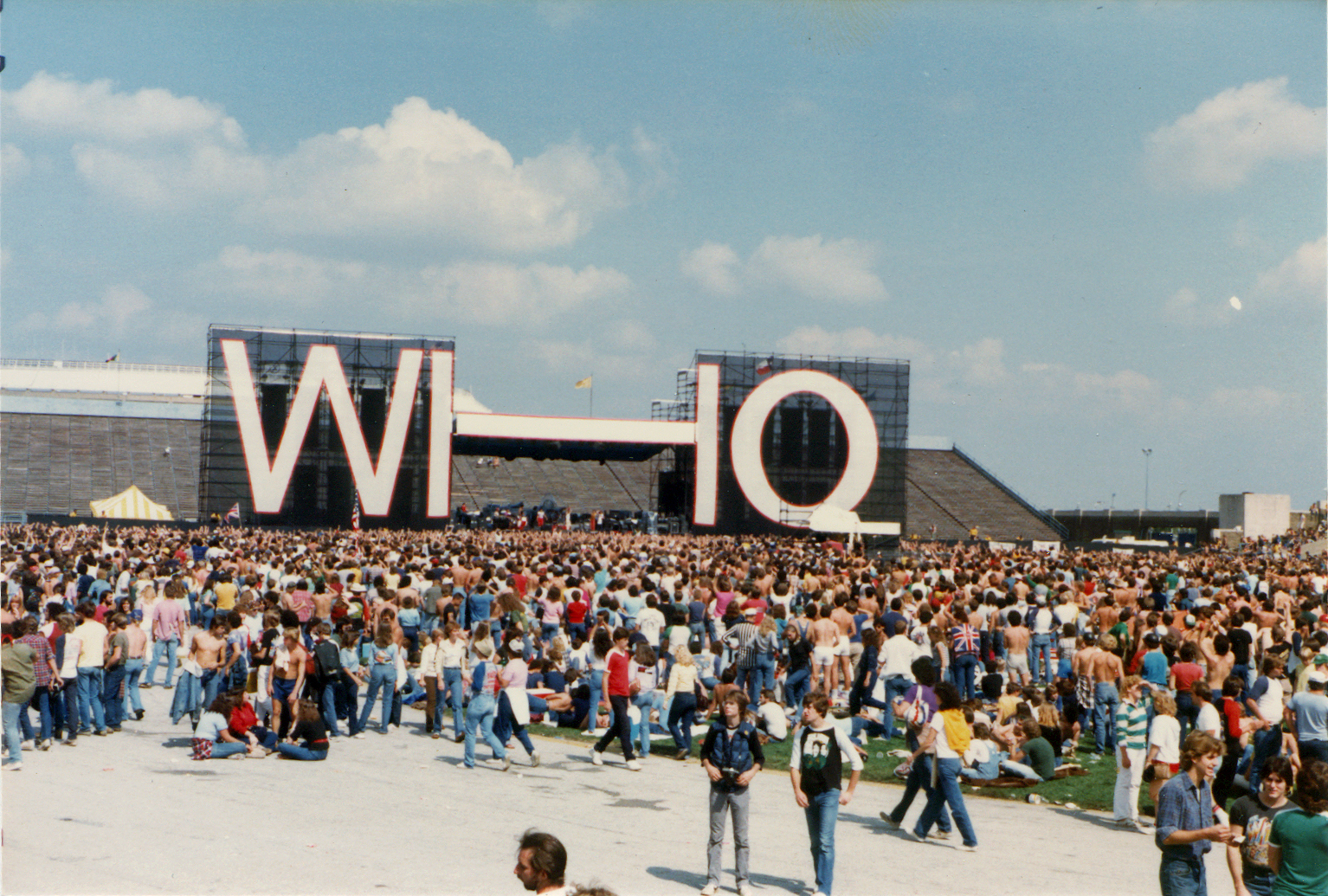
The stage before a September 1982 performance at John F. Kennedy Stadium in Philadelphia

Just over half of this album has been played live over the course of the band's career, most of the performances coming from the then farewell tour in 1982 supporting the album.

"Dangerous" was the first song from this album to be played live, as the third song on the band's first 1982 concert. Its live performances did not deviate too far from the studio cut.

"Athena" was played sporadically on the 1982 tour, sometimes as an encore and at other times in the regular set. The band hated playing the song and thought that their performance on it was not up to their standards, so they dropped it mid-tour.

"A Man Is a Man" was also played sporadically on the same tour, and its last performance also came during the same concert with the last performance of "Athena".

"It's Hard" was played throughout the entire 1982 tour and regularly featured a short full-band jam at its conclusion.

"Cooks County" was only played once, on 6 October 1982 at the Rosemont Horizon in Chicago, in place of "It's Hard". This was because the song was written by Townshend after seeing a television documentary on Chicago's Cook County Hospital.

"Eminence Front" was one of two songs (the other being "Cry If You Want") from this album to last until after the 1982 tour, and the only one to become a staple of the band's concerts. It was played in the tours of 1982, 1989, 1999, 2002, 2004, 2006–2007, 2008, 2009, 2014, 2015, 2016, 2017, 2019, and 2022.

"Cry If You Want" was played in every 1982 concert except one. These performances featured Townshend playing an extended guitar solo as an outro. In 2006, Daltrey requested that it be brought back, and it was for the first leg of the tour. However, it did not stay in the set list for long, only lasting three concerts. Later, the band would start incorporating it into their jams of "My Generation", albeit in a shorter and jazzier form, where it lasted until 2009. The song was briefly revived for The Who Hits 50! tour in late 2014.

== 2011 reissue ==
On 24 December 2011 the original mix of the album was reissued in Japan in a miniature replica of the original album art work. The album was remastered by Jon Astley for this reissue using Direct Stream Digital (DSD) to transfer the analog master tape to digital and included the bonus tracks added to the CD release of the album. The release was a limited edition in the SHM-CD format. The reissue included a picture of the original vinyl label.

== Track listing ==
All songs written by Pete Townshend except where noted. The 1997 digitally remastered reissue of It's Hard added four live tracks recorded on the last show of the Who's 1982 tour, on 17 December in Toronto.

Side one
No.	Title	Writer(s)	Length
1.	"Athena"		3:46
2.	"It's Your Turn"	John Entwistle	3:39
3.	"Cooks County"		3:46
4.	"It's Hard"		3:39
5.	"Dangerous"	Entwistle	3:17
6.	"Eminence Front"		5:37

Side two
No.	Title	Writer(s)	Length
7.	"I've Known No War"		5:46
8.	"One Life's Enough"		2:22
9.	"One at a Time"	Entwistle	2:55
10.	"Why Did I Fall for That"		3:21
11.	"A Man Is a Man"		3:54
12.	"Cry If You Want"		4:34

1997 reissue bonus tracks
No.	Title	Writer(s)	Length
13.	"It's Hard" (live)		4:56
14.	"Eminence Front" (live)		5:37
15.	"Dangerous" (live)	Entwistle	3:48
16.	"Cry If You Want" (live)		7:12

2022 reissue bonus tracks
No.	Title	Writer(s)	Length
13.	"Eminence Front" (Pete and Roger vocals)		5:29
14.	"Cry If You Want" (early alternate mix)		5:44
15.	"One Life's Enough" (Pete vocals)		2:23
16.	"Dangerous" (1997 unedited mix)	Entwistle	3:33

The 2022 reissue spread the album across 2 discs. The original album was put on three sides (1-4 on side one, 5-7 on side two, and 8-12 on side three), while the four bonus tracks were on side four.

== Personnel ==
=== The Who ===
- Roger Daltrey – lead vocals, rhythm guitar, backing vocals on "Eminence Front" and "One at a Time"
- Pete Townshend – lead and rhythm guitars, synthesisers on "Eminence Front" and "One Life's Enough", Yamaha E70 organ on "Eminence Front", piano on "One Life's Enough", backing vocals, lead vocals on "Eminence Front", co-lead vocals on "Athena" and "Cooks County"
- John Entwistle – bass guitar, horns, backing vocals, lead vocals on "One at a Time", synthesisers on "Dangerous" and "One At A Time"
- Kenney Jones – drums

=== Additional musicians ===
- Andy Fairweather Low – rhythm guitar on "It's Your Turn"
- Tim Gorman – synthesisers on "Dangerous", "One Life's Enough" and "One At A Time", organ on "Dangerous", Rhodes electric piano on "Eminence Front"

=== Production ===
- Glyn Johns – Producer, engineer
- Jon Astley – Executive producer
- Chris Charlesworth – CD reissue executive producer
- Bill Curbishley – Executive producer
- Doug Sax – Mastering
- Bob Ludwig – Remastering
- Robert Rosenberg – Executive producer
- Richard Evans – CD reissue design
- Graham Hughes – Design and photography

== Charts ==
Chart performance for It's Hard
Chart (1982)	Peak position
Australian Albums (Kent Music Report)	55
Canada Top Albums/CDs (RPM)	3
Dutch Albums (Album Top 100)	43
Norwegian Albums (VG-lista)	28
Swedish Albums (Sverigetopplistan)	47
UK Albums (Official Charts)	11
US Billboard 200	8

== Certifications ==
Certifications for It's Hard
Region	Certification	Certified units/sales
Canada (Music Canada)	Gold	50,000^{^}
United States (RIAA)	Gold	500,000^{^}
^{^} Shipments figures based on certification alone.
