= Waspman =

Instrumental by the Who
- Released: 16 June 1972 (United States); 23 December 1972 (United Kingdom)
- Recorded: 26 May 1972
- Studio: Olympic Studios (London)
- Genre: Rock
- Length: 3:09
- Label: Records; MCA
- Songwriter: Keith Moon
- Producers: The Who; Glyn Johns

"Waspman" is a mainly instrumental song by the Who, credited to their drummer Keith Moon. The song is the B-side to the Who's single "Relay" (entitled "The Relay" in the United States).

The song is supposedly a tribute to Link Wray, who became famous for his 1958 instrumental hit "Rumble" by Link Wray and his Ray Men. He introduced "the power chord, the major modus operandi of modern rock guitarists" such as Pete Townshend of the Who.

It is thought that John Entwistle wrote the song but gave the credit to Moon, as all members of the Who were supposed to write at least two B-sides, although Roger Daltrey only wrote one, "Here for More", the B-side for "The Seeker" in 1970.

== Origin and meaning of the song ==
"Waspman" originates from an incident in the late 1960s during one of the Who's many plane flights while touring. During some white-knuckle turbulence, Moon and a groupie escaped to the bathroom. Shortly after, Moon burst forth with the groupie's bra wrapped over his head and announced, "I'll save you! I'm Wasp Man!" In addition to writing this song, Keith Moon also bought a wasp costume and wore it whenever the mood struck him.
