= Eminence Front =

1982 single by the Who

- Cover of the cancelled UK single

Single by the Who

from the album It's Hard
- B-side: "One at a Time"
- Released: December 1982
- Recorded: 1982
- Studio: Turn Up-Down Studio at Glyn Johns' home in Surrey, England
- Genre: Arena rock; funk
- Length: 5:39
- Label: Polydor (UK); Warner Bros. (US)
- Songwriter: Pete Townshend
- Producer: Glyn Johns

The Who singles chronology
"Athena" (1982)	"Eminence Front" (1982)	"It's Hard" (1983)

Promo music video
- "Eminence Front" on YouTube

"Eminence Front" is a song by the English rock band the Who, written and sung by lead guitarist Pete Townshend. It appears on the band's tenth studio album It's Hard (1982). The single entered US Billboard Hot 100 on 25 December 1982, reaching number 68.

== Background and recording ==
In the song, Townshend sings about the delusions and drug use of the wealthy and hedonistic. The lyrics describe a party in which people hide from their problems behind a façade. Townshend has introduced the song in live performances with: "This song is about what happens when you take too much white powder; it's called 'Eminence Front'." In an interview, Townshend explained:

"Eminence Front" was written around a chord progression I discovered on my faithful Yamaha E70 organ. I hesitate to try to explain what it was about. It's clearly about the absurdity of drug-fueled grandiosity, but whether I was pointing the finger at myself or at the cocaine dealers of Miami Beach is hard to recall.

== Release ==
"Eminence Front" was scheduled to be released as a single in the UK by Polydor Records in 1982; the catalog number was WHO 7 but the single was never released. The picture sleeve, by Richard Evans, depicted a 1930s Art Deco house in Miami, Florida. The single in its picture sleeve was finally released in 2017 as part of the Who's box set The Polydor Singles 1975–2015. It was released as a promotional 12-inch single in both the US and UK, and as a 7-inch single in the US and Canada.

== Critical reception ==
In a wholly negative review of It's Hard, Robert Christgau gave faint praise to "Eminence Front" as the album's high point, sarcastically noting how the aging Townshend "discovers funk. Just in time. Bye." Cashbox said that it "rides along on Pete Townshend's cleanly slicing guitar and the band's patented synth sound" as well as a "strong bottom" from the drums and bass guitar. Rolling Stone ranked the song as the Who's tenth best song, stating, "'Eminence Front' showed they could connect Townshend's new wave-influenced solo work with the classic sound of Who's Next."

== Personnel ==
The Who

- Pete Townshend – lead and backing vocals, lead guitar, Yamaha E70 organ
- Roger Daltrey – rhythm guitar, backing vocals
- John Entwistle – bass guitar, backing vocals
- Kenney Jones – drums

Additional personnel

- Tim Gorman – Rhodes piano

== In popular culture ==
The song has been used by the National Basketball Association (NBA)'s Dallas Mavericks since the 2000–01 NBA season.

In 2025, "Eminence Front" appeared in the critically acclaimed psychological thriller series Severance; first during the reveal trailer for the second season, and in the ending credits of the third episode "Who is Alive?".

== Charts ==
=== Weekly charts ===
Chart (1982–1983)	Peak position
US Billboard Hot 100	68
US Mainstream Rock (Billboard)	5
