= Call Me Lightning (song) =

1968 song by The Who

Single by the Who

from the album Magic Bus: The Who on Tour
- A-side: "Dogs" (UK)
- B-side: "Dr. Jekyll and Mr. Hyde" (US)
- Released: 16 March 1968 (US); 14 June 1968 (UK)
- Recorded: January, 25/26 February 1968
- Studio: IBC Recording Studios (London, England); Gold Star Studios (Los Angeles, California)
- Genre: Pop rock; power pop
- Length: 2:25
- Label: Track (UK); Decca (US)
- Songwriter: Pete Townshend
- Producer: Kit Lambert

The Who singles chronology
"I Can See For Miles" (1967)	"Call Me Lightning" (1968)	"Magic Bus" (1968)

Official audio
- "Call Me Lightning" on YouTube

"Call Me Lightning" is a song written by Pete Townshend, guitarist of the English rock band the Who. Townshend first recorded a home demo of the song in 1964. The Who's recording was a single released in March 1968 and it later appeared on the Who's fourth American album Magic Bus: The Who on Tour.

In the United States "Call Me Lightning" was the follow-up single to the Top 10 hit "I Can See for Miles" and reached No. 40 on the Billboard Hot 100 on 4 May 1968, their 16th most successful single on the Hot 100.

Billboard described the single as a "pulsating rocker with a happy beat". Cashbox called it "an imaginative blend of rock-blues and rag" and praised "the potent group performance". Record World said it "should turn into sales lightning as The Who do it. Hard, driving beat at its best from the group."

The song features a prominent bass solo by John Entwistle. A promo film was made, and this later was included in the rockumentary film The Kids Are Alright (1979). "Call Me Lightning" was released in the United Kingdom as the B-side of the single "Dogs".

The US B-side, "Dr. Jekyll and Mr. Hyde", had been considered as a possible A-side single release, along with "Call Me Lightning", as the B-side. "Call Me Lightning" received a mediocre reception from Who fans, and biographer John Atkins feels that "Dr. Jekyll and Mr. Hyde" was a better song, even though its horror film imagery was unsuitable for a single. Cashbox called "Dr. Jekyll and Mr. Hyde" a "psychedelified throbber on the lid that could attract added attention".

The song was behind the naming of the American indie rock band Call Me Lightning.

== Charts ==
Chart (1968)	Peak position
Australia Kent Music Report	30
Canada RPM	35
Netherlands	38
New Zealand (Listener)	19
US Billboard Hot 100	40
US Cashbox Top 100	38
