= Dogs (The Who song) =

- German picture sleeve

Single by the Who
- B-side: "Call Me Lightning"
- Released: 14 June 1968 (UK)
- Recorded: 22 May 1968
- Studio: Advision Studios, London
- Genre: Power pop; psychedelic pop
- Length: 3:04
- Label: Track 604 023
- Songwriter: Pete Townshend
- Producer: Kit Lambert

The Who singles chronology
"I Can See for Miles" (1967)	"Dogs" (1968)	"Magic Bus" (1968)

"Dogs" is a UK single written by Pete Townshend and released by the Who in June 1968. It reached number 25 on the UK singles chart, lower than any single the band had released in several years. The B-side of the UK single was "Call Me Lightning". Both songs were originally released mixed in mono only, as they were not intended for album release.

== Background ==
The lyrics of "Dogs" were inspired by Townshend's friend Chris Morphet who had a fascination with greyhound racing. Morphet contributes harmonica and backing vocals. The song references two dogs who raced in the 1968 English Greyhound Derby, "Camira Flash" and "Yellow Printer".

"Dogs" was recorded at London's Advision Studios in May 1968. Townshend booked this studio as it was one of the first in the UK to install professional reel-to-reel eight-track equipment. Prior to this The Who had only recorded in the UK at studios with a maximum of four tracks.

Critics have suggested that the song is similar to "Lazy Sunday", which had been a recent hit. John Entwistle also thought it sounded like the Small Faces and that it would have been better if they had recorded it. Roger Daltrey concurred, stating that the song was Townshend's "tribute to Ronnie Lane" and that "it'd have been better if Pete had just given the song to Ronnie in the first place. As a Who record, it was all a bit frivolous for me." Townshend wrote that this was one of the songs recorded during a period when the group went "slightly mad."

A subsequent song "Dogs (Part Two)" was later released as the B-side of "Pinball Wizard" in 1969. Despite the titles the two songs are musically unrelated. "Dogs (Part Two)" is an instrumental credited to Keith Moon. Both "Dogs" songs were included on the 1987 U.S. collection Two's Missing. That album is out of print, but "Dogs" is available in a 1990s era stereo remix on the box set 30 Years of Maximum R&B; a stereo mix of "Dogs (Part Two)" was included on the bonus disc of the Tommy deluxe edition in 2003. It was once again released in mono as it was included in the two-disc edition of The Who Hits 50!.

== Critical reception ==
Uncut magazine describes the song as "mockney music-hall". Uncut praised its whimsy, imaginative arrangement and "tumultuous rhythm". Who biographer John Atkins praises its "soaring melodies, interesting chord changes and irresistible hook lines" and particularly praises "one really tremendous descending melody" at the 2:28 mark. Atkins claims that it is "probably the most underrated song ever released by The Who" and goes so far as to state that it "can be seen as a masterpiece of 1960s pop". On the contrary, author Mat Snow described the song as "amusing and zany but melodically unfocused".

== Personnel ==
- Roger Daltrey – lead vocals
- Pete Townshend – electric guitar, piano, co-lead vocals, backing vocals
- John Entwistle – bass guitar, co-lead vocals, backing vocals
- Keith Moon – drums, percussion
- Chris Morphet – harmonica, backing vocals
