= Face Dances =

1981 studio album by the Who

Studio album by the Who
- Released: 16 March 1981
- Recorded: July–December 1980
- Studio: Odyssey (London)
- Genres: Rock, hard rock
- Length: 38:53
- Labels: Polydor; Warner Bros.
- Producer: Bill Szymczyk

The Who chronology
Quadrophenia (1979)	Face Dances (1981)	Phases (1981)

Singles from Face Dances
- 1. "You Better You Bet" Released: 27 February 1981; 2. "Don't Let Go the Coat" Released: 1 May 1981

Professional ratings
Review scores
Source	Rating
AllMusic	3.5/5 stars
The Encyclopedia of Popular Music	2/5 stars
MusicHound	1.5/5 stars
Record Mirror	5/5 stars
Robert Christgau	B+
Rolling Stone	2.5/5 stars
The Rolling Stone Album Guide	3/5 stars

Face Dances is the ninth studio album by the English rock band the Who. It was released in 1981 by Warner Bros. in the United States (the band's first release on that label) and on Polydor in the United Kingdom. It is one of two Who studio albums with drummer Kenney Jones, who joined the band after Keith Moon's death three years earlier.

Despite mixed reviews from Rolling Stone and other critics, the album peaked at No. 4 on the US Billboard Top LPs & Tape chart and No. 2 on the UK Albums Chart.

== Title ==
The album was originally to be titled The Who, but the name Face Dances replaced it just before release. The phrase was inspired by a friend of Pete Townshend's who was rhythmically moving a match between her teeth, an action that Townshend jokingly termed "face dances". This incident is described in the first verse of Townshend's song "Face Dances, Pt. 2". He later realized that he had been inspired by the Face Dancers in Frank Herbert's Dune series: "It was only later that someone pointed out to me that in the Dune trilogy there are a group of characters called 'face dancers,' sort of like chameleons; they can change completely for special purposes. That must have stuck in my head because I really loved the first one."

== Album cover ==
The album cover features 16 paintings of the band members by 16 British painters, who were commissioned by Peter Blake, designer of the cover of the Beatles' album Sgt. Pepper's Lonely Hearts Club Band (1967). Artists include Tom Phillips, Richard Hamilton, Allen Jones, David Hockney, Clive Barker, R. B. Kitaj, Howard Hodgkin, Patrick Caulfield, David Inshaw, Mike Andrews, Joe Tilson, Patrick Procktor, David Tindle and Blake himself.

Photographer Gavin Cochrane took a reference photo of each of the four members of the band (Pete Townshend, Roger Daltrey, John Entwistle and Kenney Jones) which the 16 artists used to paint on 6 in × 6 in (150 mm × 150 mm) canvases the portraits of each member of the band for the front cover of Face Dances.

R. B. Kitaj did a charcoal portrait on Ingres paper of John Entwistle. Kitaj (1932–2007) was a Jewish American from Chagrin Falls, Ohio but made his home in England for many years and was elected to the Royal Academy in 1991 – the first American to do so since John Singer Sargent in the 1890s.

David Inshaw painted a portrait of Roger Daltrey that features on the cover of Face Dances. David Inshaw was a member of the Brotherhood of Ruralists along with Peter Blake and Jann Howarth and Graham and Annie Ovenden in the 1970s. In 1973, his painting 'The Badminton Game' was exhibited at the ICA Summer Exhibition and was subsequently acquired by the Tate.

Richard Hamilton did a portrait of Pete Townshend for the cover of Face Dances. Hamilton was one of the first British Pop artists, known for his painting and collage work. Hamilton was the cover designer of the Beatles' self-titled 1968 album and its poster insert. He was also known for his painting 'Swingeing London 67 (f)' which depicted Mick Jagger and art dealer Robert Fraser in handcuffs following their arrest on drug charges.

== Release ==
In 1993, Polydor re-released the album on CD. It only included the songs from the original LP.

In 1997, the album was remixed, remastered and rereleased by MCA with three outtakes as well as two live tracks. The live track "How Can You Do It Alone" is an edited version of the live performance.

"You Better You Bet" was the first single released from the album; its music video was one of the first music videos aired on MTV in 1981, and was the first to be repeated on the channel. "Don't Let Go the Coat" was the second single to be released from the album, and it also had its own music video. While a video was shot for "Another Tricky Day", the song was not released as a single commercially but it was a US Album Rock Top 10 track.

Face Dances celebrated its 40th anniversary with the release on 12 June 2021 on Record Store Day 1 of a 2-LP expanded coloured vinyl version (LP1 is blue and LP2 is yellow). Both discs have been mastered by Jon Astley at Close To The Edge and cut at half speed by Miles Showell at the Abbey Road Studios. The pressing was limited to 6500 copies. LP1 is the newly re-mastered version of the album, while LP2 has a side of studio out-takes and four live tracks from the band's 1981 Rockpalast show which appear for the first time on vinyl.

== Track listing ==
All tracks are written by Pete Townshend except where noted.

Side one
No.	Title	Writer(s)	Length
1.	"You Better You Bet"		5:36
2.	"Don't Let Go the Coat"		3:43
3.	"Cache Cache"		3:57
4.	"The Quiet One"	John Entwistle	3:09
5.	"Did You Steal My Money"		4:10

Side two
No.	Title	Writer(s)	Length
1.	"How Can You Do It Alone"		5:26
2.	"Daily Records"		3:27
3.	"You"	Entwistle	4:30
4.	"Another Tricky Day"		4:55
Total length:			38:53

1997 reissue bonus tracks
No.	Title	Writer(s)	Length
10.	"I Like Nightmares"		3:09
11.	"It's In You"		4:59
12.	"Somebody Saved Me" (Who version)		5:31
13.	"How Can You Do It Alone" (Live, 8 December 1979 at the International Amphitheatre in Chicago)		5:24
14.	"The Quiet One" (Live, 13 October 1982 at Shea Stadium in New York City)	Entwistle	4:28

2021 reissue bonus tracks
No.	Title	Writer(s)	Length
10.	"I Like Nightmares"		3:09
11.	"It's In You"		5:11
12.	"Somebody Saved Me" (Who version)		5:34
13.	"Dance It Away" (previously unreleased)		4:04
14.	"Don't Let Go the Coat" (alternate take with Pete Townshend lead vocal)		4:00
15.	"Don't Let Go the Coat" (live at Rockpalast, Grugahalle, Essen, West Germany, 28 March 1981)		3:51
16.	"You Better You Bet" (live at Rockpalast, Grugahalle, Essen, West Germany, 28 March 1981)		5:06
17.	"The Quiet One" (live at Rockpalast, Grugahalle, Essen, West Germany, 28 March 1981)	Entwistle	3:41
18.	"Another Tricky Day" (live at Rockpalast, Grugahalle, Essen, West Germany, 28 March 1981)		6:02

== Personnel ==
The Who

- Roger Daltrey – lead vocals
- Pete Townshend – guitar, keyboards, backing vocals, lead vocals on "I Like Nightmares", "Somebody Saved Me" and "How Can You Do It Alone (Live, 1979)"
- John Entwistle – bass, backing vocals, lead vocals on "The Quiet One"
- Kenney Jones – drums

Additional musicians

- John "Rabbit" Bundrick – keyboards

Production

- Allan Blazek – engineering
- Chris Charlesworth – executive producer
- Bill Curbishley – executive producer
- Greg Fulginiti – mastering
- Ted Jensen at Sterling Sound, NYC – mastering
- Bob Ludwig – remastering
- Jimmy Patterson – assistant engineering
- Teri Reed – assistant engineering
- Robert Rosenberg – executive producer
- Bill Szymczyk – production, engineering
- Jon Walls – AIR Studios, recording engineer

Artwork and design

- Michael Andrews – paintings
- Brian Aris – photography
- Clive Barker – paintings, photography, paintbox bronze on rear cover
- Peter Blake – album cover design, concept, paintings
- Patrick Caulfield – paintings
- Gavin Cochrane – photography
- Richard Evans – graphic design and cassette cover design
- Richard Hamilton – paintings
- David Hockney – paintings
- Howard Hodgkin – paintings
- David Inshaw – paintings
- Bill Jacklin – paintings
- Allen Jones – paintings
- R. B. Kitaj – paintings
- Tom Phillips – paintings
- Patrick Procktor – paintings
- Colin Self – paintings
- Joe Tilson – paintings
- David Tindle – paintings

In the order they are presented on the sleeve (left to right, top to bottom), the pictures are painted by:

Pete Townshend: Bill Jacklin, Tom Phillips, Colin Self and Richard Hamilton
Roger Daltrey: Michael Andrews, Allen Jones, David Inshaw and David Hockney
John Entwistle: Clive Barker, R. B. Kitaj, Howard Hodgkin and Patrick Caulfield
Kenney Jones: Peter Blake, Joe Tilson, Patrick Procktor and David Tindle

== Charts ==
Chart performance for Face Dances
Chart (1981)	Peak position
Australian Albums (Kent Music Report)	9
Canada Top Albums/CDs (RPM)	2
Dutch Albums (Album Top 100)	16
German Albums (Offizielle Top 100)	29
New Zealand Albums (RMNZ)	4
Norwegian Albums (VG-lista)	19
Swedish Albums (Sverigetopplistan)	17
UK Albums (Official Charts)	2
US Billboard 200	4

== Certifications ==
Certifications for Face Dances
Region	Certification	Certified units/sales
United Kingdom (BPI)	Silver	60,000^{^}
United States (RIAA)	Platinum	1,000,000^{^}
^{^} Shipments figures based on certification alone.
