= Odyssey Studios =

Former recording studio

Coordinates: 51.517°N 0.163°W

- Industry: Music, Recording studio
- Genre: Various
- Founded: 1979
- Defunct: 1989
- Headquarters: London, United Kingdom
- Products: Music

Odyssey Studios was a recording studio based near Marble Arch in London and opened in 1979. It was set up by Wayne Bickerton as an extension of State Records, the label he had set up with Tony Waddington and John Fruin in 1975. The studio closed in 1989 and the building was subsequently sold to Jazz FM.

== Albums recorded at Odyssey ==
Through the 1980s, many artists recorded at Odyssey Studios, including Cliff Richard, Paul McCartney, Kate Bush, George Michael, Spandau Ballet and Roger Daltrey. Trevor Jones' score for the feature film Labyrinth was also recorded there. The Pat Metheny Group recorded a portion of the score for the feature film The Falcon and the Snowman (1985) there.

Below is a list of some albums recorded either in part or entirely at Odyssey Studios.

Artist	Title
Marvin Gaye	In Our Lifetime
Roger Daltrey	Under a Raging Moon
XTC	Mummer
XTC	The Big Express
Roger Waters	Radio K.A.O.S.
Fashion	Twilight Of Idols
The Who	Face Dances
Alison Moyet	Alf
Phil Lynott	The Philip Lynott Album
King Crimson	Beat

== Set-up and equipment ==
Studio One in Odyssey was 1,400 square feet and had room for 50 musicians, which meant it could facilitate orchestral recordings and could be used for other activities such as video shoots. Studios 1 and 2 were equipped with MCI consoles and tape machines. Peter Jones (chief engineer) went to Fort Lauderdale, home of MCI, to commission all the equipment. At the time, they were the largest consoles that MCI had produced, and a hole in the factory wall was required to accommodate the extra length of the chassis. The studio was designed by Keith Slaughter and constructed on the "floating" principle to ensure total sound insulation. Studio Two, which was a mixing suite with capacity for 8 musicians, had an MCI 6000 48 Channel Desk which offered up to 48 tracks of recording, or the capacity to mixdown. Upstairs there was a radio facility, which offered a studio and separate control room plus a lounge area.

Odyssey was one of the first studios to install a satellite linkup, which effectively turned the studio into a miniature radio station and allowing it to broadcast any session live around the world.
