= You Better You Bet =

Song by The Who

Single by the Who

from the album Face Dances
- B-side: "The Quiet One"
- Released: 27 February 1981
- Recorded: 4 November 1980
- Studio: Odyssey (London)
- Genre: Rock
- Length: 5:36 (Album Version); 3:58 (Single Version)
- Label: Polydor (UK); Warner Bros. (US)
- Songwriter: Pete Townshend
- Producer: Bill Szymczyk

The Who singles chronology
"5.15" (1979)	"You Better You Bet" (1981)	"Don't Let Go the Coat" (1981)

Music video
- "You Better You Bet" on YouTube

"You Better You Bet" is a song by the English rock band the Who, appearing as the first track on their ninth studio album Face Dances (1981). It is sung by frontman Roger Daltrey with backing vocals from Pete Townshend and bassist John Entwistle.

"You Better You Bet" became a hit and one of the Who's most recognizable songs. It was the last single by the band that reached the top 20 on the Billboard Hot 100, reaching number 18. The track was at number one on the Billboard Top Tracks chart for five weeks beginning 4 April 1981. It was also their last single to hit the top ten in the UK Singles Chart, peaking at number 9.

== Background ==
"You Better You Bet" was written by Pete Townshend as a love song for his girlfriend at the time:

I developed ['You Better You Bet'] over several weeks of clubbing and partying. I had gone through a lean period in my marriage and was seeing the daughter of a friend of mine. I wanted it to be a good song because the girl I wrote it for is one of the best people on the planet.

Townshend also commented: "'You Better You Bet' was a very spontaneous lyric. A fairly spontaneous, peppy song; it's a pop song, really, it's just a pop song."

Roger Daltrey praised the song's vocal melody, comparing it to Elvis Presley: "A wonderful, wonderful song. The way the vocal bounces, it always reminds me of Elvis." Daltrey also noted: "'You Better You Bet' is still one of my favourite songs of all." Kenney Jones similarly spoke positively of the song, naming it the signature song from his period with the band and commenting, "That's most like me."

The song references the rock band T. Rex, as well as the group's own studio album Who's Next (1971), with the line: "I drunk myself blind to the sound of old T. Rex... and Who's Next." The synthesizer riff is performed on a Yamaha E70 home organ. Townshend's guitar part is performed on a Rickenbacker 360/12.

== Release ==
"You Better You Bet" was released as the first single from Face Dances in February 1981, backed with the John Entwistle-penned "The Quiet One". The single peaked at number 9 in the UK; in the US, it reached number 18. The single's relative underperformance is thought to have been because Warner Bros. Records had decided to boycott independent promoters in America, which resulted in less airplay for the track. Pete Townshend reflected on the single's success: "A surprise hit single for us... We even went back on Top of the Pops."

== Critical reception ==
"You Better You Bet" has seen positive critical reception since its release. Record World said that "flashy electronic keyboards usher in Roger Daltrey's souped up pop vocal." Rolling Stone ranked the song as the band's 32nd-best, stating, "Tough and to the point, 'You Better You Bet' reflects the way Townshend's enthusiasm for punk rock was tightening his songwriting. Addressed to his new girlfriend, it also hits a note of sly nostalgia when Daltrey sings about getting drunk "to the sound of old T. Rex.'" Mike DeGagne of AllMusic praised the song as "arguably the strongest track on Face Dances" and concluded, "The Who's use of synthesizers fit in perfectly with the beginning of the decade, while the song's alliterative chorus and clever use of sarcasm and wit gave it lyrical sustenance."

== Music video ==
A music video for the song was produced in black and white, featuring the band and keyboardist John Bundrick playing onstage. Upon the launch of MTV on 1 August 1981, it was the fourth video played; it was also the 55th, 98th, 141st, and 191st video to be aired, becoming the first video seen multiple times on the channel.

== Personnel ==
The Who

- Roger Daltrey – lead vocals
- Pete Townshend – guitar, keyboards, backing vocals
- John Entwistle – bass, backing vocals
- Kenney Jones – drums

Additional musicians

- John "Rabbit" Bundrick – keyboards

== Charts ==
=== Weekly charts ===
Chart (1981)	Peak position
Australia (Kent Music Report)	21
Belgium (Ultratop 50 Flanders)	9
Canada Top Singles (RPM)	4
France (IFOP)	61
Ireland (IRMA)	10
Netherlands (Dutch Top 40)	9
Netherlands (Single Top 100)	12
New Zealand (Recorded Music NZ)	23
UK Singles (Official Charts)	9
US Billboard Hot 100	18
US Mainstream Rock (Billboard)	1
US Cash Box Top 100	15

=== Year-end charts ===
Chart (1981)	Position
Belgium (Ultratop Flanders)	68
Netherlands (Dutch Top 40)	72
Netherlands (Single Top 100)	85

== See also ==
- List of Billboard Mainstream Rock number-one songs of the 1980s
