= Magic Bus (song) =

Single by the Who
- B-side: "Someone's Coming" (US); "Dr. Jekyll and Mr. Hyde" (UK)
- Released: 27 July 1968
- Recorded: 29 May 1968
- Studio: Advision, London
- Genre: Psychedelic rock; psychedelia
- Length: 3:15
- Label: Track (UK); Decca (US)
- Songwriter: Pete Townshend
- Producer: Kit Lambert

The Who UK singles chronology
"Dogs" (1968)	"Magic Bus" (1968)	"Pinball Wizard" (1969)

The Who US singles chronology
"Call Me Lightning" (1968)	"Magic Bus" (1968)	"Pinball Wizard" (1969)

Official audio
- "Magic Bus" on YouTube

"Magic Bus" is a song recorded by the English rock band the Who. It was written by their guitarist Pete Townshend during the time that their debut album My Generation was being recorded in 1965. However, it was not recorded until 1968, when it was released as a single on 27 July 1968 in the United States and Canada, followed by its release in the United Kingdom on 11 October 1968. It has become one of the band's most popular songs and has been a concert staple, although when released, the record only reached number 26 in the UK and number 25 in the United States. The song was included on their 1968 album Magic Bus: The Who on Tour.

The arrangement for "Magic Bus" uses a Latin percussion instrument called claves, which is a pair of small wooden sticks that make a distinctive high pitched sound when struck together. The Who used this instrument on the song "Disguises", which was recorded in 1966. The song makes use of the Bo Diddley beat.

== Background ==
The song was not recorded by the Who at the time it was written, but the band's management and music publisher circulated a Townshend demo recording of the song in 1966. A version was released as a single in the UK in April 1967 by an obscure band called the Pudding, in the UK on Decca and in the US on London's Press label. It was not a hit. Cash Box said that it has "a rhythmic reminiscence of 'Bo Diddley.'" Record World described it as an "intriguing ditty" with a "hypnotic lyric and melody".

The song is usually performed as a duet, where the "Rider", usually singer Roger Daltrey when live, is riding on the bus every day to see his girl. In the song he asks the "Driver", usually Townshend, if he can buy the bus from him, with the driver's initial answer being no. After haggling for a while, the driver finally lets him have it and he vows to drive it to his girlfriend's house every day.

Backing vocals were provided by the Who's sound engineer Bob Pridden and Jess Roden from the Alan Bown Set, whom Townshend credits with "that Steve Winwood-type voice".

The original LP and cassette of the Meaty Beaty Big and Bouncy compilation album featured a 4:28 longer alternate vocal take of "Magic Bus" in fake stereo which was not included on the original compact disc version because the true stereo or mono source could not be found for the long version of the song. However, on 25 July 2007, Universal Japan re-released the album in a mini-LP sleeve that includes the long alternate version of "Magic Bus" in fake stereo, as on the original album. This longer mix features an alternate vocal track, an extended middle section, and does not fade out at the end. (The original single length version did appear in true stereo only on the US "Magic Bus" LP.)

The song appeared in the band's 1979 film The Kids Are Alright taken from the 1968 single performance. It was subsequently released on The Kids Are Alright film soundtrack. That version is the mono single version, but slowed down, resulting in the song being a semi-tone lower in pitch and slightly longer at 3:21. The Polydor CD Remaster of The Kids Are Alright, issued in 2000, mistakenly states "Remixed stereo version", and should state "Remixed mono version". The 2014 compilation The Who Hits 50! features the alternate vocal long version at 4:34 in mono.

== Live performances and other uses ==
"Magic Bus" was first performed during the Who's 1968 tour and was part of the regular set from 1971 to 1976 (it was performed frequently in early-mid 1969 and less often in 1970). It has been played less frequently since Keith Moon's death in 1978, but it was frequently used as the closing song on the 2015-2016 The Who Hits 50! tour. When played live, the song typically featured a lengthy instrumental jam, with some performances lasting over 15 minutes.

A notable performance can be heard on the album Live at Leeds. This version stretches out to nearly eight minutes, with Roger Daltrey joining the jam playing harmonica. This recording was used during the musical montage sequence in the final act of Martin Scorsese's film Goodfellas as well as the opening sequence of Cameron Crowe's Jerry Maguire. Another notable performance of the song took place at The Vegas Job concert in 1999. The rhythm and beat of the song was significantly altered to a slower groove, and Townshend and Daltrey ad libbed a few verses. The harmonica jam returned again, and the song stretched out to nearly ten minutes. Another notable performance (recorded on 27 November 2000) appears on Live at the Royal Albert Hall, which morphs into a cover of "Country Line Special."

On the Thirty Years of Maximum R&B Live DVD, John Entwistle cited "Magic Bus" as his least favourite song to play, due to his bass part consisting almost entirely of the same note played repeatedly. Conversely, on the same release, Pete Townshend cited "Magic Bus" as his favourite song to play, "because of the rhythm."

The band claimed on several occasions during their 2009 tour of Australia and Japan that they were unable to play the song, with Townshend stating, "We can't play Magic Bus right now.... But if you shout loud enough... We definitely won't play it."

In 1985, Alvin and the Chipmunks covered the song for their TV series episode "The Prize Isn't Right".

Jazz musician Billy Iuso covered "Magic Bus" on his 2011 album Trippin'.

== Charts ==
=== Weekly charts ===
Chart (1968)	Peak position
Canada RPM Top Singles	6
New Zealand (Listener)	13
UK Singles	26
US Billboard Hot 100	25
US Cash Box Top 100	10

=== Year-end charts ===
Chart (1968)	Rank
Canada	75
US Cash Box	84
