= John Entwistle discography =

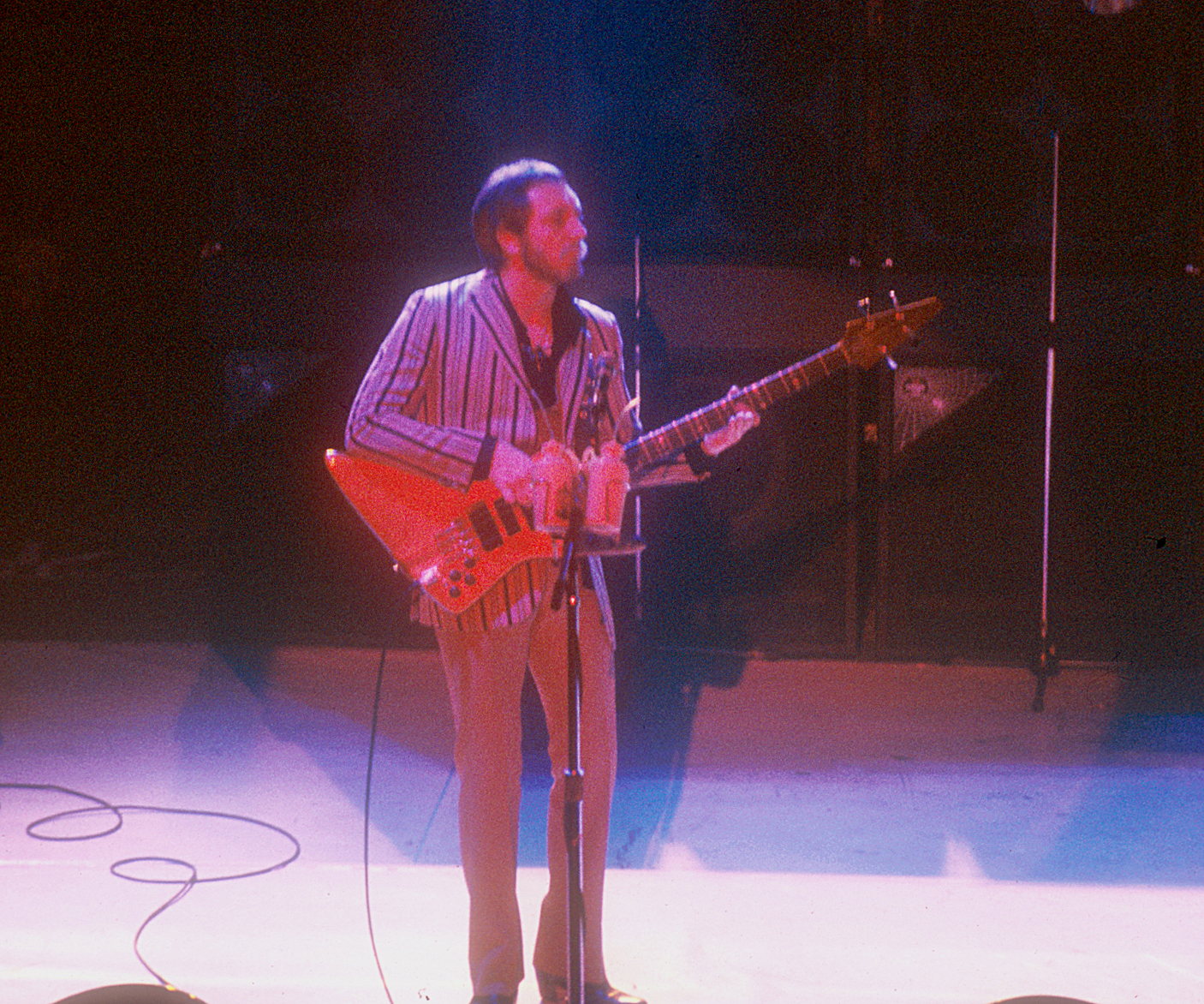
- Entwistle performing with the Who at the Manchester Apollo, 1981
- Studio albums: 7
- Live albums: 2
- Compilation albums: 4
- Singles: 9

The following is the solo discography of the English rock musician John Entwistle.

== Studio albums ==
Year	Title	Peak chart positions
Year	Title	US Billboard
1971	Smash Your Head Against the Wall	126
1972	Whistle Rymes	138
1973	Rigor Mortis Sets In	174
1975	Mad Dog	192
1981	Too Late the Hero	71
1996	The Rock	—
2000	Music from Van Pires	—
"—" denotes releases that did not chart

== Live albums ==
Year	Album
1996	King Biscuit Flower Hour Presents in Concert
1999	Left for Live

== Compilation albums ==
Year	Album
1996	Thunderfingers: The Best of John Entwistle
1996	Anthology
2005	So Who's the Bass Player? The Ox Anthology
2022	Rarities Oxhumed Volume 1

== Singles ==
Year	Title	Peak chart positions	
Year	Title	UK	US
1971	"I Believe in Everything"	—	—
1971	"My Size"	—	—
1972	"I Wonder"	—	—
1973	"Made in Japan"	—	—
1973	"Do the Dangle"	—	—
1975	"Mad Dog"	—	—
1981	"Too Late the Hero"	76	101
1981	"Talk Dirty"	—	—
2000	"When the Sun Comes Up"	—	—
"—" denotes releases that did not chart

== Other appearances ==
- "Here Comes the Sun" for Songs from the Material World: A Tribute to George Harrison

=== Session work ===
Year	Album	Artist
1975	Flash Fearless Vs. the Zorg Women, Pts. 5 & 6	N/A
1976	Any Road Up	Steve Gibbons Band
1977	One of the Boys	Roger Daltrey
1977	Fabulous Poodles	Fabulous Poodles
1977	Rough Mix	Pete Townshend and Ronnie Lane
1978	Mirror Stars	The Fabulous Poodles
1979	Framed	Dave Lambert
1980	McVicar	Roger Daltrey
1984	Un autre monde	Téléphone
1985	Eddie Hardin and Zak Starkey's Musical Version of Wind in the Willows	Eddie Hardin, Zak Starkey
1985	"You'll Never Walk Alone"	The Crowd (in aid of the Bradford City Disaster Fund)
1989	The Iron Man: The Musical by Pete Townshend	Pete Townshend
1991	When You're a Boy	Susanna Hoffs
1994	A Celebration: The Music of Pete Townshend and The Who	Roger Daltrey
1994	Halfway Back from Anywhere	Ian Brusby
1995	Looks Like Ringo, Sounds Like John	Wiseguys INTL.
1995	Ringo Starr and His Third All-Starr Band Volume 1	Ringo Starr & His All-Starr Band
1997	Baptizm of Fire	Glenn Tipton
2001	The Deep End, Volume 1	Gov't Mule
2002	The Pioneers with Special Guest Pioneer John Entwistle	The Pioneers
2006 (Posthumous)	Edge of the World	Glenn Tipton
