= So Who's the Bass Player? The Ox Anthology =

Compilation album by John Entwistle
- Released: 22 March 2005
- Genre: Rock
- Label: Sanctuary

John Entwistle chronology
Music from Van Pires (1997)	So Who's the Bass Player? The Ox Anthology (2005)

Professional ratings
Review scores
Source	Rating
AllMusic	link

So Who's the Bass Player? The Ox Anthology is a two-CD collection of the work of the late bassist for the Who, John Entwistle. It features rare recordings, spanning from the mid-1960s until his death in 2002. Included are songs written by Entwistle which were not included in some Who recordings, as well as songs which were rejected by the band originally.

The album is a compilation of Entwistle's solo career and is chronologically arranged, starting with selections from his debut studio album, Smash Your Head Against the Wall, (1971) through his last, an album of music from the 1997–1998 cartoon series Van-Pires (Music from Van-Pires, 2000), and also includes live performances.

Alice Cooper sings the lead vocals on two tracks, from Flash Fearless Vs. the Zorg Women, Pts. 5 & 6 (1975).

== Track listing ==
=== Disc one ===
1. "My Size"
2. "Pick Me Up (Big Chicken)"
3. "What Are We Doing Here?"
4. "Heaven and Hell"
5. "Ted End"
6. "Ten Little Friends"
7. "Apron Strings"
8. "Thinkin' It Over"
9. "Who Cares?"
10. "I Wonder"
11. "I Was Just Being Friendly"
12. "Do the Dangle"
13. "Made in Japan"
14. "Roller Skate Kate"
15. "Peg Leg Peggy"
16. "Lady Killer"
17. "Mad Dog"
18. "Cell Number 7" (Live)
19. "Whiskey Man" (Live)
20. "Boris the Spider" (Live)

=== Disc two ===
1. "My Wife (Live)
2. "I'm Flash" (with Alice Cooper Vocals)
3. "Space Pirates" (with Alice Cooper Vocals)
4. "To the Chop"
5. "Blast Off" (with Jim Dandy Vocals)
6. "Try Me"
7. "Talk Dirty"
8. "Too Late the Hero"
9. "Love Doesn't Last" (with Henry Small Vocals)
10. "Life After Love" (with Henry Small Vocals)
11. "The Real Me" (Live)
12. "Success Story" (Live)
13. "905" (Live)
14. "Had Enough (Live)"
15. "Bogey Man"
16. "Back on the Road"
17. "When the Sun Comes Up"
18. "Don't Be a Sucker"
