= King Biscuit Flower Hour Presents in Concert =

Live album by John Entwistle
- Released: 1998
- Recorded: March 15, 1975
- Venue: Spectrum, Philadelphia, Pennsylvania
- Genre: Rock; hard rock; rockabilly
- Length: 55:43
- Producer: King Biscuit Entertainment (In UK and US and Disky (In NL)) Remastered by Jon Astley and Andy Macpherson at Revolution Studios

John Entwistle chronology
Thunderfingers: The Best of John Entwistle (1996)	King Biscuit Flower Hour Presents in Concert (1998)	Left for Live (1999)

Professional ratings
Review scores
Source	Rating
AllMusic	3.5/5 stars

King Biscuit Flower Hour Presents in Concert is a live solo album by John Entwistle, who was the bassist for English rock band the Who. The album was recorded live for broadcast on the King Biscuit Flower Hour at the Spectrum in Philadelphia in March 1975, during a tour of North America, opening for Humble Pie.

It was produced, mixed, and mastered by Jon Astley and Andy Macpherson. They only played one song from Entwistle's current album Mad Dog ("Cell Number 7"), but included classic Who songs written by John Entwistle such as "Heaven and Hell", "My Wife" and "Whiskey Man." Other highlights included "My Size" and a cover version of Buddy Holly's "Not Fade Away." As a bonus track, the album includes an interview with Entwistle conducted by Steve Luongo (who worked on his next solo album Music from Van-Pires) and Bob Pridden. Many Ox fans have compared this album to The Who's live album Live at Leeds as it was remastered by the same personnel who remastered Live at Leeds. The album, though recorded in 1975, features a cover photo of Entwistle playing live in the 1980s or '90s.

== Track listings ==
All tracks written and composed by John Entwistle, except where indicated.

No.	Title	Length
1.	"Heaven and Hell"	4:54
2.	"Whiskey Man"	4:04
3.	"My Size"	3:48
4.	"Boris the Spider"	2:36
5.	"Not Fade Away" (Buddy Holly, Norman Petty)	6:30
6.	"Cell Number 7"	4:03
7.	"Who Cares?"	5:48
8.	"Gimme That Rock 'N' Roll"	4:18
9.	"My Wife"	6:03

=== 2005 reissue bonus track ===
No.	Title	Length
1.	"Interview"	13:39

== Personnel ==
- John Entwistle - lead vocals, bass guitar
- Graham Deakin - drums
- Robert A. Johnson - lead guitar, backing vocals
- Jeff Daily - saxophone
- Mike Deacan - keyboards
