= Thunderfingers: The Best of John Entwistle =

Compilation album by John Entwistle
- Released: 29 October 1996
- Recorded: 1971, 1972, 1973, 1975, 1981
- Genres: Rock; hard rock; rock & roll
- Label: Rhino
- Producer: Unknown

John Entwistle chronology
The Rock (1996)	Thunderfingers: The Best of John Entwistle (1996)	King Biscuit Flower Hour Presents in Concert (1998)

Professional ratings
Review scores
Source	Rating
AllMusic	4.5/5 stars

Thunderfingers: The Best of John Entwistle is a compilation album by John Entwistle, who was the bassist for the Who. The album was released in 1996 by Rhino Records. It was Entwistle's only record to be released by that company.

When AllMusic rated the album they said: "As a solo artist separate from the Who, John Entwistle has never been more than a cult figure. His solo music rocks harder than Pete Townshend's, and, at least initially, what he lacked as a singer he more than makes up for in the sheer weirdness of his lyrics. This 18-song collection may make a few converts, showcasing the best songs from five albums cut between 1971 through 1981."

== Track listings ==
All songs written by John Entwistle except those noted

No.	Title	Length
1.	"My Size"	3:47
2.	"Pick Me Up (Big Chicken)"	3:47
3.	"What Are We Doing Here?"	3:53
4.	"You're Mine"	4:43
5.	"I Believe in Everything"	3:10
6.	"Who Cares?"	4:30
7.	"Thinkin' It Over"	3:10
8.	"I Wonder"	2:58
9.	"Apron Strings"	3:47
10.	"The Window Shopper"	3:28
11.	"I Found Out"	3:50
12.	"I Feel Better"	4:46
13.	"Made in Japan"	3:57
14.	"Roller Skate Kate"	3:46
15.	"Mad Dog"	5:27
16.	"Drowning"	4:43
17.	"Fallen Angel"	4:42
18.	"Too Late the Hero"	7:27
