= Left for Live =

Live album by the John Entwistle Band
- Released: 13 July 1999
- Recorded: Recorded live throughout the United States during the 'Left for Dead' tour in 1998
- Genre: Rock; pop rock; hard rock
- Length: 1:08:32
- Label: J-Bird
- Producer: Steve Luongo; John Entwistle

The John Entwistle Band chronology
King Biscuit Flower Hour Presents in Concert (1998)	Left for Live (1999)	Music from Van-Pires (2000)

Left for Live is a live solo album by John Entwistle, who was the bassist for the Who.

In 1995, Entwistle put together a backing band with producer Steve Luongo that he christened as simply 'the John Entwistle Band'. The outfit also featured guitarist Godfrey Townsend and keyboardist Gordon Cotten with harmony vocals performed by all the members. The group documented their 1998 tour, during which they performed a mix of new, solo and classic songs from the Who.

The song "Under a Raging Moon" is written by John Parr (from St Elmo's Fire fame) and Julia Downes and is included on Roger Daltrey's 1985 solo album of the same name, the track is a tribute to the Who's drummer Keith Moon who died in 1978. It was said that Entwistle wanted to play this song instead of Won't Get Fooled Again at Live Aid with the Who but Pete Townshend disagreed so Entwistle wanted to record his own version instead as a tribute to Moon.

== Critical reception ==
When AllMusic rated the album they said, "John Entwistle may be the most esteemed bass guitarist in rock & roll – and he's a proven songwriter, too. But while Entwistle's thundering basslines and seminal synthesizer work helped make the Who the godfathers of arena rock, Left for Live is a sorry imitation. Most of the album is just generic bluster."

== Track listing ==
All songs written by John Entwistle except those noted

No.	Title	Length
1.	"Horror Rock" (Entwistle, Steve Luongo)	2:52
2.	"The Real Me" (Pete Townshend)	4:26
3.	"Darkerside of Night"	5:10
4.	"Success Story"	3:22
5.	"905"	4:50
6.	"I'll Try Again Today" (Entwistle, Luongo)	4:31
7.	"Under a Raging Moon" (Julia Downes, John Parr)	12:15
8.	"Endless Vacation" (Entwistle, Mark Hitt, Luongo)	3:36
9.	"Too Late the Hero"	7:15
10.	"Had Enough"	5:03
11.	"Shakin' All Over" (Frederick Heath)	6:13
12.	"Young Man Blues" (Mose Allison)	8:55

Deluxe Edition
No.	Title	Length
1.	"Bogeyman"	0:42
2.	"Horror Rock" (Including "Nightmare (Please Wake Me Up)")	3:32
3.	"The Real Me"	4:33
4.	"Sometimes"	4:22
5.	"My Size"	4:19
6.	"You"	4:14
7.	"Darker Side of Night"	5:36
8.	"Love Is A Heart Attack"	5:51
9.	"Success Story"	4:11
10.	"Trick of the Light"	6:13
11.	"Cousin Kevin"	4:14
12.	"Under a Raging Moon" (Including Drum Solo)	12:16
13.	"Boris the Spider"	5:04
14.	"905"	4:55
15.	"Had Enough"	5:05
16.	"Endless Vacation"	3:46
17.	"I'll Try Again Today"	4:31
18.	"Whiskey Man"	3:46
19.	"Too Late the Hero"	7:16
20.	"Young Man Blues"	8:38
21.	"Shakin' All Over" (Including Bass Solo)	6:17
22.	"Heaven and Hell" (Including "Horror Rock Reprise")	6:32
23.	"Summertime Blues"	3:43
24.	"My Wife"	6:36

== Personnel ==
- John Entwistle – lead vocals, backing vocals, eight-string bass guitar, bass guitar
- Godfrey Townsend – guitar, backing vocals
- Steve Luongo – drums, backing vocals
- Gordon Cotten – keyboards, backing vocals
