= Too Late the Hero =

Too Late the Hero may refer to:

- Too Late the Hero (film), a 1970 American war film directed by Robert Aldrich and starring Michael Caine, Cliff Robertson, Ian Bannen and Harry Andrews
- Too Late the Hero (album), a 1981 album by John Entwistle
- "Too Late the Hero" (song), a 1981 song by John Entwistle from the album of the same name
