= Dancing master =

Dancing master may refer to:

- The Dancing Master, a dance manual, first published by John Playford in 1651
- Dancing master, an early term for a dance teacher, or perhaps a choreographer
- The Compleat Dancing Master, a 1974 English folk rock album, by Ashley Hutchings with John Kirkpatrick and others
- "Dancing Master", a song on John Entwistle's 1981 album Too Late the Hero

== See also ==
- Dance
