= Endless Vacation =

Endless Vacation may refer to:

- "Endless Vacation", a song by the John Entwistle Band from the 2000 album Music from Van-Pires
- Endless Vacation, a 2015 EP by Annie
