= Do the Dangle =

Single by John Entwistle

from the album Rigor Mortis Sets In
- A-side: "Do the Dangle"
- B-side: "Gimme That Rock 'n' Roll"
- Released: May 1973 (UK); June 1973 (US)
- Recorded: October–November 1972
- Studio: Nova Sound (London)
- Genre: Rock; hard rock; rock and roll
- Length: 4:05
- Label: Track; MCA
- Songwriter: John Entwistle
- Producers: John Entwistle; John Alcock

John Entwistle singles chronology
"Made In Japan" (1973)	"Do the Dangle" (1973)	"Mad Dog" (1975)

Official audio
- "Do the Dangle" on YouTube

"Do the Dangle" is a song written and recorded by the English rock musician John Entwistle for his third solo studio album, Rigor Mortis Sets In (1973). The entire album is an affectionate homage to, or satire of, 1950s and 1960s rock and roll music. In addition to some actual "oldies", original compositions include "Roller Skate Kate" and "Peg Leg Peggy". The lyrics for the latter say that Peggy "really knows how to hop", a phrase originally used in rock songs to mean that a person was a skilled dancer, but in this case is a blackly humorous reference to Peggy having an artificial ("peg") leg.

The song is also found on Entwistle's compilation album So Who's the Bass Player? The Ox Anthology (2005).

The BBC said that "Do the Dangle" song "prospers" Entwistle's dark sense of humour, and that it is a "1950s" rock and roll homage about strangulation.

The song's opening lines list actual popular dances from the early to middle 1960s: the shake, boogaloo, mashed potatoes, hoochie-coo, twist, and funky chicken. All of these dances, and numerous others, were created after the huge international popularity of the aforementioned twist, which began in 1960 with the release of the song of the same name by Hank Ballard. A sound-alike cover version by Chubby Checker tremendously out-sold the original, and was the first recording to attain the number one position on Billboard magazine's Top 100 listing in two different years (1960 and 1961). The overall dance fad faded after 1965 when progressive rock music rapidly evolved away from lightweight subjects like dancing.

In "Do the Dangle", composer Entwistle sings of three new dances, invented by him in 1972 but described in the style which would have been used a decade earlier. These are the wheezy, the strike, and the dangle. Instructions for dancing the latter, from the lyrics, are:

"Here's a brand new dance with a brand new angle / It's the very last waltz, and it's called the Dangle / You tie a rope 'round your neck, then you stand on a chair / Then you kick it away, and you're dancing on air."

The dark humor of this ironically light-hearted description of suicide via strangulation ends with Entwistle urging his listeners, "Everybody get up and – swing!" This phrase too had been used in older songs as an exhortation to dance, but here conjures a vision of a body swinging from a rope.

Entwistle called this album Rigor Mortis Sets In and illustrated the cover with a photo of a coffin and a grave, implying that rock music was dying or dead, and that one could only look back at its earlier days of glory. In fact it was released just as a re-appreciation of older rock and roll was just getting started, which served to invigorate the careers of former singing stars and introduced their songs to a new audience. An early manifestation of this awareness was the performance of the group Sha Na Na (a nonsense phrase from the 1950s doo-wop song "Get a Job") who sang 1958's "At the Hop" at Woodstock in 1969. Popular music had changed so drastically in the previous ten years that the Woodstock audience could laugh knowingly at the perceived naïveté of the 1950s. The film American Graffiti, first shown in 1973 (the same year of Rigor Mortis Sets In) was the real instigation of the fad for the so-called "fabulous '50s" which also inspired the hit television series Happy Days. Although American Graffiti was set in 1962, its soundtrack featured 1950s music, to emphasise that society was about to change drastically the following year with the assassination of President John F. Kennedy and the subsequent upheavals in much of society.
