= Van-Pires =

- Created by: John Gentile; Anthony Gentile
- Developed by: Ron Kaehler
- Directed by: John Gentile and Anthony Gentile
- Starring: Marc Schwarz; Garikayi Mutambirwa; Melissa Marsala; Jason Hayes
- Country of origin: United States
- No. of episodes: 13

Production
- Executive producers: Brandon Pender, AGE Inc.
- Running time: approx. 30 minutes
- Production companies: Abrams/Gentile Entertainment; MSH Entertainment Corporation

Original release
- Network: First-run Syndication
- Release: September 14 – December 7, 1997

Van-Pires is a 1997 animated children's television series with live-action segments. It was produced by Abrams/Gentile (New York), with CGI animation being produced under MSH (San Francisco). The show was syndicated by The Summit Media Group.

Van-Pires also had portions of its soundtrack written and performed by John Entwistle of the rock band The Who and Steve Luongo, Entwistle's long-time friend, producer, and drummer in The John Entwistle Band with Noam Kaniel.

Van-Pires centers on a group of human teenagers who protect and defend the world from evil anthropomorphic junkyard vans and vehicles known as the "Van-Pires" by transforming into robotic anthropomorphic cars, calling themselves the "Motor-Vaters".

"When a mysterious meteor crashes into a lonely junkyard, derelict vans and cars take on human-like life. The Van-Pires suck the gas from innocent cars to feed their need for speed and drain the planet of all its fuel. Only four teenagers transformed by the meteor stand between the Van-Pires and a world sucked dry and running on empty. Part teen, part car, all hero. The Motor-Vaters must fight the night to save the day. So check your fear and get in gear, the Van-Pires are here!"

— opening narration

== Characters ==
=== Motor-Vaters ===
Four ordinary teens were accidentally caught in the path of a falling meteor. The meteor transformed them into heroic robotic guardians to protect the night from the evil forces of Tracula (a reference to "Dracula") and the rest of the Van-Pires. Each Motor-Vater has the ability to fly and they also share the same weaknesses as their enemies; like the Van-Pires, the Motor-Vaters require gas to sustain themselves and must avoid the sun at all costs. To transform, each hero gets into the driver's seat of his or her Carfin (a portmanteau of "car" and "coffin") and shouts, "Mission Ignition!"

- Axle (Jason Hayes) – The leader of the Motor-Vaters. He takes his role seriously and does what it takes to keep the team together. However, Axle can be too serious with his responsibilities either causing self-doubt when something goes awry or alienating one of the other Motor-Vaters. In his Motor-Vater form, Axle's color scheme is yellow with red fire designs. These colors are the same as his Carfin, which resembles a Lincoln convertible.
- Snap (Garikayi Mutambirwa) – Snap is a very laid back person but is ready to jump into action when trouble rises. Unlike the other Motor-Vaters (who speak exclusively in car puns), he speaks exclusively in a mangled form of African American Vernacular English. His Motor-Vater form is blue with a purple trim. Snap's Carfin is a blue hippie van.
- Nuke (Marc Schwarz) – Nuke is the team's strongman and thrill seeker. He has mastered the art of weaponized flatulence. His Motor-Vater form is green and modeled after a tow truck, complete with hook and crane. Nuke's Carfin is also a green tow truck.
- Rev (Melissa Marsala) – Rev is a tomboy, but she gets down and dirty just like the rest of the guys. Sometimes, Rev is not afraid to show off her feminine side. She is the target of both Nuke and Tracula's romantic affections, but she ignores them both because of her special relationship with her mentor Van He'll Sing. In her Motor-Vater form, she is a red and armed with a fire hose and axe. Her Carfin is a fire truck.

=== Allies ===
- Van He'll Sing (Unknown as the character is credited as playing himself) – The Motor-Vaters' friend and advisor. Van is an old hippie that runs Sunrise Salvage, a junkyard in which the gang works and hangs out. His name is derived from the famous Bram Stoker character Van Helsing.
- Gypsy – An old female gypsy cab with mufflers for arms. She shows up at random times and gives the Motor-Vaters advice in the form of riddles.
- Greaspot – The Motor-Vaters' pet. He is a neon-colored plastic tricycle with the behavioral instincts of a puppy dog. It is never explained why Greaspot does not thirst for fuel (though it is possible that, because he's a tricycle, he simply has no need for fuel) or why he does not turn to dust in the sun.

=== Van-Pires ===
The titular villains of the series are the Van-Pires. Unlike the Motor-Vaters, they lack human forms. Led by Tracula, they terrorize the night with an insatiable thirst for gasoline. Similar to vampires, Van-Pires feed off vehicles and can sire other Van-Pires to further their nefarious plans.

- Tracula (Jonathan Davis) – The leader of the Van-Pires, and the main villain of the series. Tracula is a purple monster truck that demands obedience from his minions.
- Cardaver – A rusty and decrepit hunchbacked Van-Pire modeled after a hearse.
- Ambula (Donna Daley) – A female ambulance with six arms modeled after the Bride of Frankenstein. She is armed with an assortment of surgical tools and anaesthesia. She has an Electra complex (with Tracula playing the role of Agamemnon and Rev playing the role of Clytemnestra).
- Automaniac – An ice cream truck with a clown motif. Automaniac appears goofy and harmless, but his arsenal of ice cream and balloon animals shows otherwise.
- Alucart – Tracula's son, constructed out of leftover auto parts and meant to be Tracula's heir. He befriends the Motor-Vaters, who dub him Alucart because it is his father's name backwards (in the same way that "Alucard" is Dracula spelled backwards). He only appeared in one episode and is based on Frankenstein's monster.

== Production ==
The animation was produced by San Francisco-based MSH Entertainment produced the CGI animation for the series using the Jethro Animation Management System while the live-action components and script development were handled by Abrams/Gentile Entertainment. The two companies entered into a joint venture in November 1996 to co-produce the first thirteen episodes.

All 13 episodes of the show had total budget of $5.2 million.

According to MSH Entertainment President, Jonathan Stathakis, the series was renewed for a second season and also sparked discussions about a possible feature film adaptation.

== Episodes ==
1. "Those Who Have the Fuel Shall Rule" (written by Anthony Gentile and John Gentile)
2. "Unleaded Zeppelin" (written by Anthony Gentile, John Gentile, and Lisa Morton)
3. "A Few Good Cars" (written by Anthony Gentile, John Gentile, Peter Stone, and Ron Kaehler)
4. "Mission Demolition" (AKA "Night of Destruction") (written by Anthony Gentile, John Gentile, Peter Stone, and Ron Kaehler)
5. "Bride of Tracula" (written by Anthony Gentile, John Gentile, and Ron Kaehler)
6. "Tailpipes from the Crypt" (written by Anthony Gentile, John Gentile, Peter Stone, and Ron Kaehler)
7. "Bad to the Cone" (written by Anthony Gentile, John Gentile, Peter Stone, and Ron Kaehler)
8. "Nukenstein" (written by Anthony Gentile, John Gentile, and Ron Kaehler)
9. "A Car is Born" (written by Anthony Gentile, John Gentile, and Lisa Morton)
10. "The Swarm Storm" (written by Anthony Gentile, John Gentile, Peter Stone, and Ron Kaehler)
11. "Rebel Without a Car" (written by Anthony Gentile, John Gentile, and Ron Kaehler)
12. "One Million Miles B.C." (written by Anthony Gentile, John Gentile, Peter Stone, and Ron Kaehler)
13. "Uncool Fuel" (written by Anthony Gentile and John Gentile)

== Broadcast ==
The series was broadcast through first-run syndication airing in 90% of markets through UPN, The WB, and Fox network affiliates.

The series was broadcast in the United States through broadcast syndication beginning September 13, 1997.

== Soundtrack ==
In 2000, the John Entwistle Band released Music from Van-Pires as an official album and soundtrack to the series. It was John Entwistle's last solo album before his death two years later.
