= Talk Dirty (John Entwistle song) =

Single by John Entwistle

from the album Too Late the Hero
- A-side: "Talk Dirty"
- B-side: "Try Me"
- Released: December 1981
- Recorded: Completed in May 1981
- Studio: Ramport (London)
- Genre: Rock; new wave
- Length: 4:08 (Too Late the Hero); 4:03 (So Who's the Bass Player? The Ox Anthology)
- Label: Atco (UK); WEA (UK)
- Songwriter: John Entwistle
- Producers: John Entwistle; Dave "Cyrano" Langston

John Entwistle singles chronology
| "Too Late the Hero" (1981) | "Talk Dirty" (1981) | "When the Sun Comes Up" (2000) |

Official audio
- "Talk Dirty" on YouTube

"Talk Dirty" is a song by the English rock musician John Entwistle, former bassist for the Who. It was released in September 1981 as a single from his fifth solo studio album, Too Late the Hero (1981), on which he is also joined by guitarist Joe Walsh (who was a member of three commercially successful bands such as the James Gang, Barnstorm and the Eagles). He was also joined by drummer Joe Vitale, who had a career dating back to the early 1970s.

The song received airplay in the United States on the album-oriented rock radio, and Entwistle had a November 1987 radio interview with the American broadcaster and media personality Howard Stern about it. It later proved to become Entwistle's highest charting single release, peaking at number 41 on the Billboard Mainstream Rock chart.

== Critical reception ==
When critic Chris Welch was reviewing the album (available on the 1997 release of the album) he stated (in length) that "'Talk Dirty' is the kind of concept that would get severely criticised by the politically correct. A snappy cowbell rhythm brings in an uptempo raver during which John falls into a kind of rap, telling his partner that he'd rather talk dirty than discuss the merits of Chopin, Shakespeare or Van Gogh"

== Compilation appearances ==
The song is also on Entwistle's 2005 compilation album, So Who's the Bass Player? The Ox Anthology the version on this album is faster than the release on Too Late the Hero.

== Personnel ==
Musicians

- John Entwistle — lead vocals, bass guitar, eight-string bass guitar, synthesizers
- Joe Walsh — lead guitar
- Joe Vitale — drums

== Charts ==
| Chart (1981) | Peak position |
|---|---|
| US Mainstream Rock (Billboard) | 41 |
