= A Walk Down Abbey Road =

2001–02 concert tour by Alan Parsons

- Tour by Alan Parsons
- Associated album: Varied
- Start date: 2001
- End date: 2002

Alan Parsons' A Walk Down Abbey Road was a concert tour that was launched in North America in 2001 to pay tribute to The Beatles and promote the hits of various headlining band members. Similar to Ringo Starr's All Starr Band tours, each successive year the band members swapped out and featured the songs of the new line-up.

The first set included all band members assembled to play each other's hits. The second set featured all Beatles songs performed by various band members depending on the specific tune and the strength and style of the performer.

An obvious play on concert-goers expectations with Who bassist John Entwistle in the group, the second song of the opening set was "Open My Eyes" from Todd Rundgren's first band, The Nazz. The chord pattern at the beginning is lifted directly from The Who's "I Can't Explain". It was one of Entwistle's last concert series as he died on 27 June 2002, one day before the scheduled first show of The Who's 2002 US tour.

== 2001 tour ==
=== Band ===
- Alan Parsons: vocals, guitar, keyboards
- Todd Rundgren: vocals, guitar, vocals
- Ann Wilson: vocals, guitar, vocals
- John Entwistle: bass guitar, vocals
- David Pack: guitar, vocals

Additional musicians:

- Godfrey Townsend: guitar, backing vocals (from John Entwistle Band)
- Steve Luongo: drums (from John Entwistle Band)
- John Beck

=== Set list: Set 1 ===
1. "Magical Mystery Tour (Pack, Wilson)
2. "Open My Eyes" (Rundgren)
3. "Eye In The Sky" (Parsons)
4. "Crazy On You" (Wilson)
5. "My Wife" (Entwistle)
6. "Hello, It's Me" (Rundgren)
7. "Don't Answer Me" (Parsons)
8. "Biggest Part Of Me" (Pack)
9. "How Much I Feel" (Pack)
10. "Bang the Drum All Day" (Rundgren)
11. "The Real Me" (Entwistle)
12. "Dreamboat Annie" (Wilson)
13. "Games People Play" (Parsons)
14. "Barracuda" (Wilson)
15. "My Generation" (Pack, Rundgren)

=== Set list: Set 2 ===
1. "Back in the U.S.S.R." (Pack)
2. "Lady Madonna" (Rundgren)
3. "I'm Down" (Wilson)
4. "The Fool on the Hill" (Pack)
5. "While My Guitar Gently Weeps" (Rundgren, Wilson)
6. "Here Comes the Sun" (Entwistle)
7. "Lucy in the Sky with Diamonds" (Pack, Wilson)
8. "You've Got to Hide Your Love Away" (Rundgren acoustic solo)
9. "Maybe I'm Amazed" (Wilson)
10. "Rain" (Rundgren)
11. "Blackbird" (Parsons acoustic solo)
12. "Everybody's Got Something to Hide Except Me and My Monkey" (Wilson)
13. "Revolution" (Rundgren)
14. "Day Tripper" (Pack, Rundgren)
15. "Ticket to Ride" (Pack, Rundgren)
16. "I Want to Hold Your Hand" (Pack, Rundgren)
17. "Hey Jude" (Wilson)

=== Encore ===
1. "Birthday" (All)
2. "Golden Slumbers" / "Carry That Weight" / "The End" (Wilson)

=== Tour dates ===
Date	City	Country	Venue
North America
~~June 13, 2001~~	Redmond	United States	Deschutes County Fairgrounds
June 15, 2001	Kelseyville	United States	Konocti Harbor
June 16, 2001	Anaheim	United States	Sun Theater
June 17, 2001	Anaheim	United States	Sun Theater
June 18, 2001	Saratoga	United States	Villa Montalvo
June 19, 2001	Saratoga	United States	Villa Montalvo
June 20, 2001	Saratoga	United States	Villa Montalvo
June 22, 2001	San Diego	United States	Humphrey's Concerts By the Bay
June 23, 2001	Phoenix	United States	Celebrity Theater
June 24, 2001	Mescalero	United States	Inn of the Mountain Gods Casino
June 26, 2001	Houston	United States	Arena Theater
June 27, 2001	Mobile	United States	Saenger Theater
June 29, 2001	Clarkston	United States	DTE Energy Music Theater
June 30, 2001	Seven Springs	United States	Seven Springs Mountain Resort
July 2, 2001	Saint Paul	United States	Harriet Island Regional Park
July 3, 2001	Milwaukee	United States	Henry W. Maier Festival Park
July 5, 2001	Chicago	United States	Grant Park
July 6, 2001	Dayton	United States	Fraze Pavilion
July 7, 2001	Big Flats	United States	Tag's Summer Stage
July 8, 2001	Hamilton	Canada	Copps Coliseum
July 9, 2001	Verona	United States	Turning Stone Resort & Casino
July 10, 2001	Montville	United States	Mohegan Sun Casino
July 11, 2001	Boston	United States	Fleet Pavilion
July 13, 2001	Waikoloa Village	United States	Hilton Waikoloa Village
July 16, 2001	Barnstable	United States	Cape Cod Melody Tent
July 17, 2001	Vienna	United States	Filene Center
July 19, 2001	Oyster Bay	United States	Westbury Music Fair
July 21, 2001	Stanhope	United States	Waterloo Village
July 22, 2001	Wallingford	United States	Oakdale Theater
~~July 25, 2001~~	York	United States	York Expo Center
July 26, 2001	New York City	United States	Seaside Park
July 27, 2001	Mantua Township	United States	Washington Township High School
July 28, 2001	Marion	United States	Carolina Amphitheater
Asia
November 9, 2001	Tokyo	Japan	Tokyo Kousei Nenkin Kaikan
November 10, 2001	Tokyo	Japan	Tokyo Kousei Nenkin Kaikan
November 12, 2001	Osaka	Japan	Osaka Kousei Nenkin Kaikan
November 13, 2001	Fukuoka	Japan	Fukuoka Sun Palace
November 14, 2001	Nagoya	Japan	Nagoya Shimin Kaikan

== 2002 tour ==
=== Band ===
- Alan Parsons: vocals, guitar, keyboards
- Todd Rundgren: vocals, guitar, backing vocals (Selected dates)
- Christopher Cross: vocals, guitar, backing vocals
- Jack Bruce (of Cream): bass guitar, backing vocals
- Mark Farner (of Grand Funk): vocals, guitar, backing vocals
- Eric Carmen (of The Raspberries): vocals, guitar, backing vocals (Eric Carmen was originally scheduled to take part, and perform at the shows where Todd Rundgren was not available, he only plays on the first show)

Additional musicians:

- Godfrey Townsend: Guitar, backing vocals
- John Beck: keyboards
- Steve Murphy: drums
