= Graham Deakin =

English drummer

- Born: 1950 (age 75–76); Chelmsford, Essex, England
- Genre: Rock
- Occupation: Drummer
- Instruments: Drums; percussion
- Years active: 1971–present
- Formerly of: The Flys

Graham Deakin (born c. 1950) is an English rock drummer, who was the main drummer for John Entwistle's touring band, Ox, from 1972 until 1977. Deakin had a short spell with the Flys following his departure from Ox.

Deakin, who was born in Chelmsford, Essex, played a session with the Who on 21 April 1975 at Ramport Studios, three days before they started recording their seventh studio album The Who by Numbers.

Deakin also performed on the entirety of John Entwistle's third solo studio album, Rigor Mortis Sets In (1973). He additionally performed on the Who's soundtrack to the film Tommy (1975).

He has also featured on albums by the Moody Blues and John Lodge, as well as the entirety of another Entwistle solo album, Mad Dog (1975). Deakin also played drums on the album, Blue Jays (1975), recorded by Justin Hayward and John Lodge.
