= I Believe in Everything (song) =

Single by John Entwistle

from the album Smash Your Head Against the Wall
- A-side: "I Believe in Everything"
- B-side: "My Size"
- Released: May 1971
- Recorded: November 1970 and January 1971
- Studio: Trident (Soho, London)
- Genre: Rock
- Length: 3:07
- Label: Track; Polydor
- Songwriter: John Entwistle
- Producer: John Entwistle

John Entwistle singles chronology
| "I Believe in Everything" (1971) | "My Size" (1971) |

Official audio
- "I Believe in Everything" on YouTube

"I Believe in Everything" is a song by the English rock musician John Entwistle. "I Believe in Everything" was released as a single in 1971. The B-side was "My Size". The song also appears on Entwistle's debut solo studio album, Smash Your Head Against the Wall (1971). When Entwistle was asked about the song in comparison to the rest of the album, he said:

I've been saying a lot of stuff that I didn't really believe in. I sort of wrote it for the heads, really, the people thinking, "ah, so that's where Entwistle's brain's at, he really sort of believes in the devil and hell and all that sort of business." So I wrote a number that touches on reincarnation, then goes into the absurd, with Father Christmas and the whole bit and right at the end just to prevent the heads from thinking that I did believe in everything like I was saying, 'cause they always seem to believe that you actually believe in your own words. I believe in some of them but not all of them, so I just wrote the joke in to throw them off, and it's done it.

The song ends with a chorus of the 1949 song "Rudolph, the Red-Nosed Reindeer".

== Personnel ==
- John Entwistle – vocals, bass guitar; piano; keyboards
- Dave "Cyrano" Langston – guitar
- Jerry Shirley – drums
