= Rigor Mortis Sets In =

Studio album by John Entwistle
- Released: As Rigor Mortis Sets In in May 1973 (UK) and as John Entwistle's Rigor Mortis Sets In in June 1973 (US)
- Recorded: October–November 1972
- Studio: Nova Sound (London)
- Genre: Rock; hard rock; rock and roll
- Length: 33:58
- Label: Track; MCA
- Producer: John Entwistle; John Alcock

John Entwistle chronology
Whistle Rymes (1972)	Rigor Mortis Sets In (1973)	Mad Dog (1975)

US Cover

Singles from Rigor Mortis Sets In
- 1. "Made in Japan" Released: 1973; 2. "Do the Dangle" Released: 1973

Rigor Mortis Sets In is the third solo studio album by the English rock musician John Entwistle, who was the bassist for the Who at that time. Distributed by Track Records, the album was named John Entwistle's Rigor Mortis Sets In in the US. The second studio album to be co-produced by Entwistle and John Alcock, it consists of two 1950s rock and roll cover versions, one 1960s cover, a new version of the Entwistle song "My Wife" from the Who's fifth studio album Who's Next (1971), and new tracks (only six of the ten songs were original material). Rigor Mortis Sets In set in motion Entwistle assembling his own touring band during the increasing periods of the Who's inactivity.

Bearing the dedication "In Loving Memory of Rock 'n' Roll 1950–∞: Never Really Passed Away Just Ran Out of Time", Entwistle's affection for 1950s rock and roll was evident by cover versions of Elvis Presley's 1953 song "Hound Dog", and Little Richard's 1957 song "Lucille". As George Lucas had released American Graffiti (1973) at the same time as Rigor Mortis Sets In was released, creating a huge market for 1950s nostalgia, Entwistle's timing was uncannily prescient. In Entwistle's original material for the album, light whimsy prevailed over the darker (and more creative) vein of Smash Your Head Against the Wall (1971) and Whistle Rymes (1972). The album was completed in less than three weeks, ultimately costing $10,000 in studio time and $4,000 on liquor bills.

The cover art of the gatefold LP features on one cover an outdoor photo of a grave, whose heart-shaped headstone is engraved with the dedication described above, while the grave's footstone is inscribed "V.S.O.P." (a grading acronym for cognac). The opposite cover features a wooden coffin bearing a brass plate engraved with the album's title. The UK (Track) LP used the coffin on the cover and the gravestone on the inner gatefold, while the US (MCA) LP had the opposite arrangement. CD releases have been fronted with Track's original coffin cover, with the gravestone cover proportionally preserved inside as part of the liner notes.

Rigor Mortis Sets In had a rough launch due to its title and cover art. BBC Radio refused to play the album and banned it, ironically in part due to the influence of disc jockey (DJ) Jimmy Savile who had just suffered a death in his family. The album's US debut was problematic for MCA Records (Track's new American distributor), who insisted on appending the artist's name to the title, out of concern that the album's sales would be weak without the Entwistle name in the title. It peaked at No. 174 on the US Billboard 200.

== Critical reception ==
Professional ratings
Review scores
Source	Rating
AllMusic	2/5 stars
Christgau's Record Guide	C+

The album was considered by AllMusic to be a "nosedive" in Entwistle's career compared to Smash Your Head Against the Wall and Whistle Rymes. Critic Donald A. Guarisco opined that the covers of "Hound Dog" and "Lucille" were "so lifelessly performed that it sounds like the band is merely attempting to imitate Sha Na Na instead of sending up the original tunes themselves", and noted the cover version of Johnny Cymbal's "Mr. Bass Man" as having "a self-consciously campy production built on cutesy vocals guaranteed to make listeners grind their teeth".

The album was more positively received by John Rockwell of The New York Times. In a 1973 article about solo albums released by members of popular bands, Rockwell said that the album found Entwistle "working effectively in a straight-ahead fifties idiom that the Who themselves have long since abandoned."

== Track listing ==
All tracks are written by John Entwistle, except where noted.

Side one
No.	Title	Writer(s)	Length
1.	"Gimme That Rock 'n' Roll"		3:00
2.	"Mr. Bass Man"	Johnny Cymbal	2:49
3.	"Do the Dangle"		4:05
4.	"Hound Dog"	Jerry Leiber; Mike Stoller	2:29
5.	"Made in Japan"		3:48

Side two
No.	Title	Writer(s)	Length
6.	"My Wife"		3:32
7.	"Roller Skate Kate"		4:14
8.	"Peg Leg Peggy"		3:38
9.	"Lucille"	Albert Collins; Richard Penniman	2:53
10.	"Big Black Cadillac"		3:35
Total length:			33:58

CD bonus tracks
No.	Title	Length
11.	"BP Big Gallon Jingle ('100 Miles of Motorway')" (Demo)	0:35
12.	"BP Big Gallon Jingle ('100 Miles of Motorway')" (Demo with voiceover)	0:33
13.	"Made in Japan" (Early take)	3:54
14.	"Peg Leg Peggy" (Early take)	3:57

== Personnel ==
Musicians

- John Entwistle – lead vocals, bass guitar, electric guitar, keyboards
- Alan Ross – electric guitar, acoustic guitar, piano, accordion, trumpet, synthesizer; lead vocals (2)
- Jim Ryan – lead guitar
- Graham Deakin – drums, percussion (5, 6, 8)
- Tony Ashton – keyboards, Hammond organ, piano
- Bryan Williams – trombone, electric organ (6, 8)
- Howie Casey – saxophone (1, 3, 4)
- Members of the Ladybirds:
  - Gloria George – backing vocals
  - Maggie Stredder – backing vocals
  - Marian Davies – backing vocals

Technical

- John Entwistle – producer
- John Alcock – producer
- Mike Weighell – engineer

== Charts ==
Chart	Peak position
US Billboard 200	174
