= Too Late the Hero (album) =

Studio album by John Entwistle
- Released: 23 November 1981
- Recorded: 1979–May 1981
- Studio: Crystal (Los Angeles); Ramport (London)
- Genre: Pop rock; new wave; hard rock; arena rock
- Length: 42:07
- Label: ATCO (US); WEA (UK)
- Producer: John Entwistle; Dave "Cyrano" Langston

John Entwistle chronology
Mad Dog (1975)	Too Late the Hero (1981)	The Rock (1996)

Singles from Too Late the Hero
- 1. "Too Late the Hero" Released: October 1981; 2. "Talk Dirty" Released: December 1981

Too Late the Hero is the fifth and final solo studio album by the English rock musician John Entwistle, released on 23 November 1981 by ATCO Records in the US, and by WEA in the UK. This was his only solo studio album of the 1980s and his last album to chart. The album peaked at No. 71 on the US Billboard 200, making it his best-selling album and his only album to reach the top 100.

"Talk Dirty" was the first single released from the album and it received some airplay in the US on album-oriented rock radio, peaking at No. 41 on the US Mainstream Rock Tracks chart. "Too Late the Hero" was the second single to be released from the album and it would be his only single to chart on the UK singles chart, peaking at No. 76. It also peaked at No. 101 on the US Billboard Bubbling Under Hot 100 chart, making it his best-selling single all round. "Too Late the Hero" was the only single from the album that had a music video filmed for it.

Entwistle co-produced the album with Dave "Cyrano" Langston, his first work with Langston since his debut studio album Smash Your Head Against the Wall (1971). It was recorded as a core trio of musicians that were Entwistle on bass guitar with Joe Walsh of the Eagles providing all guitar work and Walsh's former Barnstorm bandmate Joe Vitale on drums, with all three playing keyboards. Billy Nicholls also sang backing vocals on most of the tracks.

== Cover ==
The album cover is an assemblage of photographs taken by Gered Mankowitz. It depicts Entwistle with an Alembic Explorer bass guitar over grainy photos of him dressed as various heroes. The red suit and ankle boots worn by Entwistle were later sold at auction for $4,687.50.

== Composition ==
The album was Entwistle's first solo studio album in six years. "I had stopped writing because I thought I was going in the wrong direction with the 'shoo-bop, shoo-bop,' old rock & roll stuff on Rigor Mortis Sets In and Mad Dog. When I started writing again, I went back to the kind of material I was writing before those albums."

"Until about two years ago, I tried to stay away from certain subjects. I was getting a feeling from everyone – from the fans right through my wife and family – that if you write about hookers, you must go to hookers, and if you write about drugs, you must take drugs. I got this reputation for sinister black humour after things like Whistle Rymes, when I was getting up at six in the morning to feed my son, Christopher, and then sitting down at the piano at seven to write songs about peeping Toms and suicide cases."

== Recording ==
The album was recorded over a couple of years, during the infrequent months when both Entwistle and long-time friend Joe Walsh were free (Walsh's James Gang toured extensively with the Who in the early 1970s, and the two had planned to collaborate for years).

== Critical reception ==
Professional ratings
Review scores
Source	Rating
AllMusic	1.5/5 stars
MusicHound Rock: The Essential Album Guide	0/5 stars
The Rolling Stone Album Guide	2.5/5 stars

In the AllMusic review by Ben Davies, he praises the contributions of Joe Walsh on lead guitar and Joe Vitale on drums, but says that they were unable to save the album from being boring. The reviewer concedes that the combination of these musicians would have seemed, "Like something of a dream proposition back in the 1970s," making the album an even bigger disappointment. MusicHound Rock: The Essential Album Guide awarded the album zero stars, calling it "a misguided, overblown collaboration with the severely unwitty Joe Walsh." The Rolling Stone Album Guide conceded that it "rocks capably."

== Track listing ==
All tracks are written by John Entwistle.

Side one
No.	Title	Length
1.	"Try Me"	3:55
2.	"Talk Dirty"	4:06
3.	"Lovebird"	4:51
4.	"Sleeping Man"	3:55
5.	"I'm Coming Back"	4:01

Side two
No.	Title	Length
6.	"Dancing Master"	4:23
7.	"Fallen Angel"	4:40
8.	"Love Is a Heart Attack"	5:13
9.	"Too Late the Hero"	7:25
Total length:		42:07

2005 bonus tracks
No.	Title	Length
10.	"Sleeping Man" (Demo)	4:02
11.	"Dancing Master" (Demo)	3:25
12.	"I'm Coming Back" (Demo)	4:11
13.	"Love Is a Heart Attack" (Demo)	2:53
14.	"Overture"	5:11

== Personnel ==
Credits are adapted from the Too Late the Hero liner notes.

Musicians

- John Entwistle – vocals; bass guitar; eight-string bass guitar; piano; synthesisers
- Joe Walsh – acoustic and electric guitars; piano; cabasa; waste container; tambourine; limps; synthesiser
- Joe Vitale – drums; percussion; piano; flute; Clavinet; timpani; metronome
- Billy Nicholls – backing vocals (1, 3–6, 9)

Production and artwork

- John Entwistle – producer
- Dave "Cyrano" Langston – producer
- Joe Walsh – executive producer
- Joe Vitale – executive producer
- Dave "Cyrano" Langston – engineering
- Neil Hornby – assistant engineer
- Jim Hill – assistant engineer
- Jeff Eccles – assistant engineer
- Mike Reese – mastering
- Gered Mankowitz – album cover design; concept; cover photo; photography

== Charts ==
Chart performance for Too Late the Hero
Chart (1981)	Peak position
US Billboard 200	71
US Billboard Top Rock Albums	17
