= Whistle Rymes =

Studio album by John Entwistle
- Released: 3 November 1972
- Recorded: May 1972
- Studio: Island (London)
- Genre: Rock; hard rock
- Length: 40:24
- Label: Track; Polydor; Decca
- Producer: John Entwistle; John Alcock

John Entwistle chronology
Smash Your Head Against the Wall (1971)	Whistle Rymes (1972)	Rigor Mortis Sets In (1973)

Singles from Whistle Rymes
- 1. "I Wonder" Released: 1972

Whistle Rymes is the second solo studio album by the English rock musician John Entwistle, released on 3 November 1972 by Track Records in the UK and on 4 November 1972 by Decca Records in the US. Entwistle co-produced the album with John Alcock, his first work with a producer after self-producing his debut studio album, Smash Your Head Against the Wall (1971), and it was recorded at Island Studios in West London's Notting Hill district. The album features guitar contributions from both Peter Frampton of Humble Pie and Jimmy McCulloch (who would later join Paul McCartney and Wings).

The album sold around 175,000 copies, and peaked at No. 138 on the US Billboard 200 but as with his debut studio album it failed to chart in his home country.

The album was initially remastered and re-issued in 1996 by Repertoire Records, featuring no bonus content. The album was later remastered and re-issued again in 2005 by Sanctuary Records but this time featuring rare bonus content; the bonus content consists of two unreleased demos of songs that didn't make it onto the album (one of which is "Back on the Road" which would later be recorded by the John Entwistle Band for their sole studio album, Music from Van-Pires, which would also be the last studio album released during Entwistle's lifetime). This version of the album also has two demos of songs featured on the original album. However, all versions of the album remain out of print, and CD copies are especially hard to find.

== Background ==
The album's title pokes fun at a common misspelling of Entwistle's surname. Several of the tracks give a humorous look on domestic life, following the birth of Entwistle's son, Christopher, earlier that year.

"Ten Little Friends" was written on piano at Entwistle's Ealing home studio at the time and sprang from a bout of writer's block. The title comes from a set of troll figures given to him by the Who's drummer Keith Moon. The track features a guitar solo from Peter Frampton, who also played on other songs on the album. As well as his usual bass guitar, Entwistle also plays bass synthesizer.

== Packaging ==
Then Surrey-based artist Graham Lethbridge designed the album's gatefold cover artwork (at the suggestion of producer John Alcock). A watercolor painting, it depicts little scenes that were taken from themes expressed within the songs on the album. With a day and night theme, the front cover depicts nighttime scenes, and the back is of daylight scenes. The time that it took to paint the artwork delayed the album's release.

== Release ==
The original 1972 UK release of this album was on Track Records and distributed by Polydor. The first US issue of this album was by the silver Track/Decca label. A year later it was reissued in the US by MCA.

== Critical reception ==
Professional ratings
Review scores
Source	Rating
AllMusic	link
Christgau's Record Guide	B

In a retrospective review for AllMusic, critic Donald A. Guarisco wrote that the album combines "catchy, straightforward, pop-tinged rock with dark, often bitingly sarcastic lyrics."

== Track listing ==
All tracks are written by John Entwistle.

Side one
No.	Title	Length
1.	"Ten Little Friends"	4:03
2.	"Apron Strings"	3:47
3.	"I Feel Better"	4:46
4.	"Thinkin' It Over"	3:12
5.	"Who Cares?"	4:28

Side two
No.	Title	Length
6.	"I Wonder"	2:58
7.	"I Was Just Being Friendly"	3:33
8.	"The Window Shopper"	3:28
9.	"I Found Out"	3:51
10.	"Nightmare (Please Wake Me Up)"	6:16
Total length:		40:24

2005 Bonus Tracks
No.	Title	Length
11.	"I Wonder" (Demo)	2:52
12.	"All Dressed Up" (Demo)	2:53
13.	"Back on the Road" (Demo)	3:53
14.	"Countryside Boogie" (Demo)	4:28

== Personnel ==
Credits are adapted from the Whistle Rymes liner notes.

Musicians

- John Entwistle — lead vocals; bass guitar; keyboards; synthesizers; bass synthesizer; trumpet; piano; French horn
- Peter Frampton — electric guitar
- John Weider — backing vocals; violin (10)
- Rod Coombes — drums
- Gordon Barton — drums
- Jimmy McCulloch — electric guitar
- Neil Sheppard — electric piano; organ
- Bryan Williams — trombone; keyboards
- Alan Ross — acoustic guitar

Production and artwork

- John Entwistle — producer
- John Alcock — producer
- Brian Humphries — engineer
- Mike Weighell — engineer
- Graham Lethbridge — cover design; drawing

== Charts ==
Chart	Peak position
US Billboard 200	138
