= Too Late the Hero (song) =

Single by John Entwistle

from the album Too Late the Hero
- A-side: "Too Late the Hero"
- B-side: "I'm Coming Back"; "Dancing Master"
- Released: October 1981
- Recorded: Completed in May 1981
- Studio: Ramport (London)
- Genre: Progressive rock
- Length: 7:35 (album version); 3:16 (single version)
- Label: Atco (US); WEA (UK)
- Songwriter: John Entwistle
- Producers: John Entwistle; Dave "Cyrano" Langston

John Entwistle singles chronology
"Mad Dog" (1975)	"Too Late the Hero" (1981)	"Talk Dirty" (1981)

Music video
- "Too Late the Hero" on YouTube

"Too Late the Hero" is a song written and recorded by the English rock musician John Entwistle, released as the lead single from his fifth solo studio album, Too Late the Hero (1981). Entwistle's best-selling single, it peaked at No. 76 on the UK singles chart and at No. 101 on the US Billboard Bubbling Under Hot 100. It was Entwistle's only chart placing in the UK.

In the UK the single was released as a limited-run picture disc of 500, all hand signed by Entwistle in return for a case of the finest whiskey.

Simon Morgan of the BBC compared "Too Late the Hero" to Phil Collins' song "In the Air Tonight".

== Compilation appearances ==
The song is also found on Entwistle's compilation albums, Thunderfingers: The Best of John Entwistle (1996), Anthology (1996), and So Who's the Bass Player? The Ox Anthology (2005).

== Personnel ==
Musicians

- John Entwistle – lead vocals, bass guitar, synthesizers, tambourine, timps
- Joe Walsh – lead guitar, synthesizers
- Joe Vitale – drums, piano, flutes
- Billy Nicholls – backing vocals

== Charts ==
Chart	Position
UK Singles (Official Charts)	76
US Bubbling Under Hot 100 (Billboard)	101
