= The Rock (John Entwistle album) =

Studio album by the Rock / John Entwistle
- Released: 27 August 1996
- Recorded: 1985–1986
- Studio: Hammerhead Studio (Gloucestershire, England)
- Genre: Rock; pop rock; glam metal; arena rock; hard rock
- Length: 41:58
- Label: Griffin Music
- Producer: Martin Adam; The Rock

The Rock / John Entwistle chronology
Too Late the Hero (1981)	The Rock (1996)	Thunderfingers: The Best of John Entwistle (1996)

Professional ratings
Review scores
Source	Rating
AllMusic	link

The Rock is the only studio album by the English rock band The Rock, credited to founding bassist John Entwistle of the Who, issued by Griffin Music.

The album was recorded by the band over a period of eighteen months between 1985 and 1986 at Entwistle's Hammerhead Studios in Gloucestershire. It was originally planned for release by WEA in 1986 but it was not officially released until ten years later, by which point Entwistle was given credit for the project. The album has been released in four different editions between 1996 and 2005, each time with different artwork.

The Rock was Entwistle's only studio album in which he did not sing lead or backing vocals on any tracks, a role performed instead by American-born Canadian Henry Small, formerly of the band Prism.

The album was re-released in Europe in 2005 on Castle Music, featuring rare bonus content. The reissue was a CD comprising sixteen tracks. It includes the original album, digitally remastered from the original 1/2" mix tapes, alongside three outtakes – two of which were written by and feature Andy Nye on keyboards – and one demo and early versions of the songs featured on the album.

== Tour ==
Eight years before the album was officially released there was a supporting tour for it, which lasted from June to August 1988, covering the United States and Canada.

== Critical reception ==
Mark Deming of AllMusic retrospectively gave the album two and a half out of five stars and wrote that "There's no questioning the technical skill of the performances -- this band sounds tight and expert throughout, and Entwistle and [Zak] Starkey are a mighty rhythm section -- but most of Small's songs are a mass of clichés and the guitar and keyboard figures firmly date this album as a product of the mid-'80s." adding that "The Rock trades [Entwistle's] more distinctive work for faceless cookie-cutter hard rock, and there's no denying he could do better."

== Track listing ==
All tracks are written by Henry Small and Devin Powers, except where noted.

No.	Title	Writer(s)	Length
1.	"Stranger in a Strange Land"	Thomas Whitlock; Eddie Money; Henry Small	4:29
2.	"Love Doesn't Last"	John Entwistle	3:38
3.	"Suzie"	Small; Devin Powers; Davitt Sigerson	4:28
4.	"Bridges Under the Water"	Entwistle	4:03
5.	"Heartache"		5:05
6.	"Billy"		3:45
7.	"Life After Love"	Entwistle	4:19
8.	"Hurricane"		4:23
9.	"Too Much Too Soon"		3:30
10.	"Last Song"	Entwistle	3:54
11.	"Country Hurricane"		0:43
Total length:			41:58

Additional tracks

2005 re-mastered version bonus tracks
No.	Title	Writer(s)	Length
12.	"Casualty (outtake)"	Egan; Barnacle; Andy Barnett; Strange	4:21
13.	"Light in the Dark (outtake)"	Andy Nye	4:15
14.	"Break Your Heart (outtake)"	Nye	3:25
15.	"Love Doesn't Last (demo)"	Entwistle	3:34
16.	"Heartache (early version)"		5:07

== Personnel ==
Credits are adapted from the album's liner notes.

- John Entwistle – bass guitar; trumpet; trombone
- Henry Small – lead and background vocals; trumpet; trombone
- Gene Black – guitar
- Devin Powers (Mark R. Adams) – guitar
- Zak Starkey – drums
- Adrian Cook – keyboards

Production

- Martin Adam – producer; engineer
- The Rock – producer
- John Entwistle – post-production; cover design
- Bob Pridden – post-production
- Jon Astley – mastering

== See also ==
- List of albums released in 1996
- John Entwistle's discography
