= Smash Your Head Against the Wall =

Studio album by John Entwistle
- Released: May 1971
- Recorded: November 1970 and January 1971
- Studios: Trident (Soho, London)
- Genres: Hard rock; psychedelic rock
- Length: 37:34
- Labels: Track; Polydor; Decca
- Producer: John Entwistle

John Entwistle chronology
Smash Your Head Against the Wall (1971)	Whistle Rymes (1972)

Singles from Smash Your Head Against the Wall
- 1. "I Believe in Everything" Released: May 1971

Smash Your Head Against the Wall (stylised as Smash your head against the wall.) is the debut solo studio album by the English rock musician John Entwistle, released in May 1971 by Track Records in the UK and Decca Records in the US. Smash Your Head Against the Wall was the first solo album by any member of rock band the Who, born out of Entwistle's frustrations within the band, namely not having as many of his songs featured on their albums as he would've liked, and it features a guest appearance by the Who's drummer Keith Moon on one track ("No. 29 (External Youth)"), as well as strong musical influences from the band's work.

Entwistle self-produced the album and it was recorded at Trident Studios in Soho, London over two weeks, with a young Roy Thomas Baker engineering the album (his first work). Baker would later become known for his work as a producer for the rock band Queen, and the same studio piano that was used by Entwistle during the sessions for this album was later used by Freddie Mercury on "Bohemian Rhapsody". The album peaked at No. 126 on the US Billboard 200 but it failed to chart in his home country.

The album was initially remastered and re-issued in 1996 by Repertoire Records, featuring one bonus track, a cover of Neil Young's "Cinnamon Girl", that was only previously available as a bootleg. The album was later remastered and re-issued again in 2005 by Sanctuary Records but this time featuring more extensive rare bonus content; the bonus content this time consists of three unreleased demos of songs that didn't make it onto the album (amongst them is "It's Hard to Write a Love Song" which would later be reworked into the song "Drowning" for his 1975 studio album Mad Dog) as well as four demos of songs featured on the album, an early take of "My Size", and "Cinnamon Girl" from the previous re-issue. It was reissued again in early 2024 as part of a CD boxed set comprising Entwistle's six solo albums; a vinyl reissue, its first since 1981, followed in May 2024.

== Packaging ==
The macabre cover artwork was concocted by Entwistle and photographer Graham Hughes, cousin of the Who's lead vocalist Roger Daltrey. It depicts Entwistle's face whilst wearing a death mask, transposed against an X-ray picture of the lungs of a terminal heart patient, obtained from Entwistle's doctor at the time. It has been compared to the cover of the studio album Vintage Violence (1970) by the Welsh rock musician John Cale. The gatefold cover features the X-ray of a pregnancy test, maintaining the "life vs. death" theme. And the back cover features one of Entwistle's Irish Wolfhounds lying down with a human skull.

== Background ==
The album features a remake of Entwistle's Who live classic "Heaven and Hell" with the band's on-and-off roadie Dave "Cyrano" Langston, who had encouraged Entwistle to make the album and provided some acid-drenched guitar. Langston was even thought to be the Who's guitarist Pete Townshend under a pseudonym. Cyrano would later explain that he had been more influenced by Joe Walsh than anybody else, especially by his work with the James Gang, who had themselves actually been influenced by the Who, and had also been an opening act for the band. Walsh himself would later play guitar on all of the tracks to Entwistle's fifth solo studio album, Too Late the Hero (1981).

When Entwistle was asked about his first single, "I Believe in Everything", in comparison with the tone of rest of the album, he said:

I've been saying a lot of stuff that I didn't really believe in. I sort of wrote it for the heads, really, the people thinking, "ah, so that's where Entwistle's brain's at, he really sort of believes in the devil and hell and all that sort of business." So I wrote a number that touches on reincarnation, then goes into the absurd, with Father Christmas and the whole bit and right at the end just to prevent the heads from thinking that I did believe in everything like I was saying, 'cause they always seem to believe that you actually believe in your own words. I believe in some of them but not all of them, so I just wrote the joke in to throw them off, and it's done it.

Pete Townshend went on to say that "We learned more from John making his album than we had in all the years he'd played bass with us. Because he did it and it spoke to us."

The UK album differs from the US version. Entwistle remixed "What Are We Doing Here?" and the vocals sound quite different. Entwistle had not been fully satisfied with his initial vocal track, so in early 1971, he re-recorded his lead vocals, while leaving the original harmony vocals untouched. This version was originally released on the US version of the album in 1971, and later appeared as a bonus track on the 1996 Repertoire Records remaster of the album.

== Critical reception ==
Professional ratings
Review scores
Source	Rating
AllMusic	4.5/5 stars
Christgau's Record Guide	B
The Rolling Stone Album Guide	3/5 stars

Writing for The Village Voice, music journalist Robert Christgau gave the album a B, and described Entwistle as "an important source of the fucked-up Calvinism that has always added that peculiar note of constraint to the Who", while adding that "These paeans of resentment and frustration climax thematically in songs called "Heaven and Hell" and "You're Mine" (starring John as Satan). But the music—not the melodies, the singing and playing—adds some not-so-peculiar constraints of its own."

In a retrospective review for AllMusic, critic Cub Koda wrote of the album, "Musically, it has much of a Who flavor to it, with the strong guitar work, lumbering drums and basslines that define the music. But Entwistle's many talents (he contributes an entire horn section to "Pick Me Up") surface on this debut disc, and his preoccupation with darker subject matter ("Heaven and Hell," "My Size," and "You're Mine") is well to the fore", adding that "Compared to this, Townshend's grimmest Who material sounds like a romp in the park. Potent stuff."

== Track listing ==
All tracks written and composed by John Entwistle, except where indicated.

Side one

1. "My Size" – 3:43
2. "Pick Me Up (Big Chicken)" – 3:43
3. "What Are We Doing Here?" – 3:49
4. "What Kind of People Are They?" – 2:44
5. "Heaven and Hell" – 4:50

Side two

1. "Ted End" – 2:33
2. "You're Mine" – 4:39
3. "No. 29 (Eternal Youth)" – 5:25
4. "I Believe in Everything" – 3:07

1997 bonus tracks

10. "Cinnamon Girl" (Neil Young)
11. "What Are We Doing Here?" (alternative mix)

2005 bonus tracks

10. "Cinnamon Girl" (Neil Young)
11. "It's Hard to Write a Love Song" (demo)
12. "The Haunted Can Be Free" (demo)
13. "World Behind My Face" (demo)
14. "My Size" (early take)
15. "What Kind of People Are They?" (demo)
16. "Pick Me Up (Big Chicken)" (demo)
17. "No. 29 (External Youth)" (demo)
18. "Ted End" (demo)

== Personnel ==
Credits are adapted from the Smash Your Head Against the Wall liner notes.

Musicians

- John Entwistle – lead vocals; bass guitar; piano; keyboards; flugelhorn; trumpet; trombone
- Dave "Cyrano" Langston – electric and acoustic guitars; backing vocals
- Jerry Shirley – drums
- Vivian Stanshall – Latin American percussion (8)
- Keith Moon – Latin American percussion (8); backing vocals
- Neil Innes – Latin American percussion (8); backing vocals

Production and artwork

- John Entwistle – producer
- Roy Thomas – engineer
- Graham Hughes – cover artwork; design; photography
- Bob Irwin of Sundazed – mastering on 1997 edition

== Charts ==
Chart	Peak position
US Billboard 200	126
