= My Size =

Single by John Entwistle

from the album Smash Your Head Against the Wall
- B-side: "I Believe in Everything"
- Released: May 1971
- Recorded: November 1970 and January 1971
- Studio: Trident (Soho, London)
- Genre: Hard rock
- Length: 3:43
- Label: Track
- Songwriter: John Entwistle
- Producer: John Entwistle

John Entwistle singles chronology
| "I Believe in Everything" (1971) | "My Size" (1971) | "I Wonder" (1972) |

Official audio
- "My Size" on YouTube

"My Size" is a song by the English rock musician John Entwistle. The song is the opening track on his debut solo studio album Smash Your Head Against the Wall (1971) and ends with the main riff from one of Entwistle's popular compositions for the Who, "Boris the Spider". "My Size" was released as a promotional single in May 1971.

== Background and composition ==
When Entwistle was asked about the song, he said simply: "'My Size,' was just written in the studio, we wrote the chord progressions and then I went home and composed the tune and the words." In another interview Entwistle called "My Size" a sequel to his 1966 song with the Who, "Boris the Spider". He said, "I wrote it as a sequel to 'Boris the Spider' for our manager. Our manager wanted me to put 'Boris the Spider' on my album. So I wrote 'My Size' and I wrote it in a sort of code so it sounds as if it were being sung about a woman. Then I stuck the ending on it as a clue. It wasn't a very good clue, I suppose."

== Release ==
Entwistle said: "A lot of people thought that 'My Size' from 'Smash Your Head' was actually the new Who single."

The 'My Size' versions on the Sundazed and Repertoire re-releases are completely different. Both of the LPs match the Sundazed version.

== Critical reception ==
When the BBC were reviewing the compilation album So Who's the Bass Player? The Ox Anthology (2005) they said that the sound sounded like a Black Sabbath song, namely "Sabbath Bloody Sabbath".

== Personnel ==
- John Entwistle – vocals, bass guitar
- Dave "Cyrano" Langston – guitar
- Jerry Shirley – drums
