= Steve Luongo =

American drummer

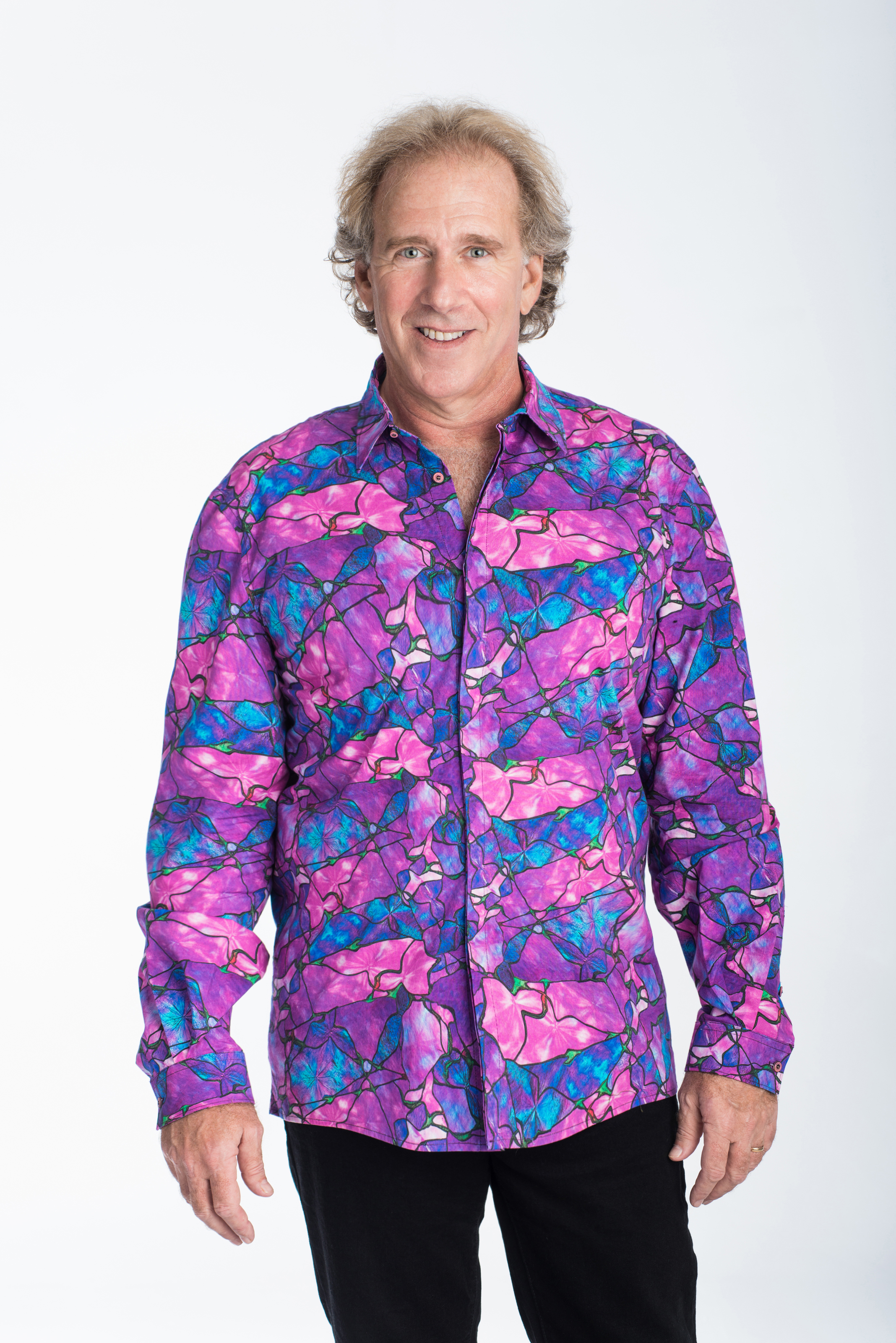
- Luongo in 2016

Background information
- Born: Stephen L Luongo; September 21, 1952 (age 74); Westchester, New York
- Genres: Rock; pop rock
- Occupations: Musician; producer; songwriter; film maker
- Instruments: Drums; vocals
- Years active: 1958–present
- Website: steveluongo.com

Steve Luongo (born September 21, 1952) is an American drummer, singer, songwriter and record producer who hails from Westchester, New York.

== Early career ==
Luongo was one of the founding members of the New York-based rock group Rat Race Choir in 1968. He was a pioneer of electronic percussion in the early 1970s. Luongo performed extended drum solos on a massive kit including a prototype of the Moog Synthesizer Drum. His trademark move was drumming with one hand and both feet while playing in time along with a mechanical toy monkey held up in front of a microphone with his free hand. Rat Race Choir would dominate the NY tri-state music scene in the 70s and 80s. They are considered to be “musician’s musicians” by many successful music artists including New Orleans rockers Zebra, Steve Stevens and Steve Vai among others.

== Later career ==
Luongo has produced, performed and recorded with several well-known artists including Leslie West of Mountain, Cream bassist Jack Bruce, Eddie Money, Alan Parsons, Todd Rundgren, Heart's Ann Wilson, Ritchie Blackmore, Mark Farner, Joe Walsh, Billy Squier. The most prolific and significant of all was his work with John Entwistle best known as the iconic bass guitarist for The Who. The two musicians became the best of friends. Luongo produced, performed, co-wrote and toured with The John Entwistle Band until Entwistle's death in 2002. Their last live performance together was in Japan during the A Walk Down Abbey Road tour. Later that year he was invited by The Who and Entwistle's family to write and read the eulogy at Entwistle's memorial service in London.

Late in 2002 Luongo and Rat Race Choir guitarist Mark Hitt formed the progressive rock band TorQue. The two musicians co-wrote 11 songs for the debut album titled TorQue 103103. Luongo served as producer, lead vocalist and drummer. Luongo has said that 103103 is among his proudest musical achievements.

In 2007, Luongo served as producer and composer for a studio band he created with AC/DC bassist Cliff Williams. Williams recruited frontman Brian Johnson as the vocalist and Luongo brought in his Rat Race Choir bandmate Mark Hitt on guitar. The project later known as Forklift gave birth to 7 tracks. "Chain Gang on the Road" was the only track offered by the quartet. The song was briefly available for a free download during a run of US tour dates in (2007).

Later career: in 2012 Luongo began a musical partnership with Cheap Trick vocalist Robin Zander by forming The Robin Zander Band. Zander and Luongo have been friends and musical allies for many years. Zander was among the first to be asked to appear in Luongo's documentary film An Ox's Tale - The John Entwistle Story about the late John Entwistle. The band toured nationally for 3 years.

== Visual artist ==
Luongo began creating works of visual art at 4 or 5. He went on to study art in school and never lost his love of color and form. In 2008 he joined the Naples art association at the von Liebig in Naples, FL. In 2008-2010 Luongo was invited to display his art at galleries, exhibitions and art showings. It was during that time he decided to put his original art on fine fabric that would be made into men's shirts. It was not until 2016 that he formed Steve Luongo Designs and began creating limited edition wearable art shirts. These shirts are based on his original ink and acrylic canvases. Each shirt is named, numbered and signed turning them into wearable limited edition art prints.
