= Music from Van-Pires =

Studio album / Soundtrack album by the John Entwistle Band
- Released: 2000
- Recorded: Between 1978 – 1997
- Genre: Pop rock; rock
- Length: 56:16
- Label: Pulsar
- Producer: John Entwistle; Steve Luongo

The John Entwistle Band chronology
Left for Live (1999)	Music from Van-Pires (2000)	So Who's the Bass Player? The Ox Anthology (2005)

Singles from Music from Van-Pires
- 1. "When the Sun Comes Up" Released: 2000

Professional ratings
Review scores
Source	Rating
AllMusic	link

Music from Van-Pires is the only studio album recorded by the John Entwistle Band and was Entwistle's final studio work before his death in 2002. It was a soundtrack for the Sci-Fi Award-winning UPN animated children's computer-generated television series Van-Pires, which only aired between 1997 and 1998, shooting 13 episodes, which Entwistle had been involved with. Some of the tracks appear on his solo compilation album So Who's the Bass Player? The Ox Anthology (2005). The album was not re-released alongside Entwistle's other solo studio albums in 2005.

The song "Bogey Man" was originally written for the Who's eighth studio album Who Are You (1978) by Entwistle, but was rejected by the band for being too humorous. A demo was recorded by Entwistle and Keith Moon. The demo was largely forgotten and was believed to have been lost until the 1990s. Entwistle resorted to his old demos for material for the soundtrack to the 1997 children's television programme Van Pires, to help him meet a contract which agreed he would write and record 13 new songs and a theme tune in 3 months. When the band's drummer, Steve Luongo heard the demo, he recognized Keith Moon's drumming on the demo, and the band decided to record a new version of the song with Moon's original drum track.

== Track listing ==
No.	Title	Writer(s)	Length
1.	"Horror Rock"	John Entwistle, Steve Luongo	2:55
2.	"Darker Side of Night"	Entwistle, Luongo, Alan St. Jon	4:22
3.	"Sometimes"	Entwistle, Luongo, St. Jon	4:20
4.	"Bogey Man"	Entwistle	4:00
5.	"Good and Evil"	Godfrey Townsend, St. Jon, Entwistle, Luongo	5:31
6.	"When You See the Light"	Luongo	4:01
7.	"Back on the Road"	Entwistle	4:06
8.	"Left for Dead"	St. Jon, Entwistle, Luongo	3:53
9.	"When the Sun Comes Up"	St. Jon, Entwistle, Luongo	4:12
10.	"Rebel Without a Car"	Entwistle, Luongo	3:37
11.	"Don't Be a Sucker"	Townsend, Entwistle, Luongo, St. Jon	4:18
12.	"Endless Vacation"	Entwistle, Luongo, Mark Hitt	3:20
13.	"I'll Try Again Today"	Entwistle, Luongo	3:56
14.	"Face the Fear"	Townsend, Entwistle, Luongo	3:38
Total length:			56:16

== Personnel ==
The John Entwistle Band

- John Entwistle – vocals, bass guitar, brass, orchestration, mixing
- Steve Luongo – percussion, drums, vocals, orchestration, mixing
- Alan St. Jon – keyboards, synthesizer, organ, backing vocals, orchestration
- Godfrey Townsend – guitar, backing vocals

with:

- Leslie West – lead guitar and lead vocals on "Don't Be a Sucker"
- Keith Moon – drums on "Bogey Man"
- Mark and Jade Varley – speech on "Good and Evil"

Technical

- Bobby Pridden – engineer
