= Mad Dog (album) =

Studio album by John Entwistle's Ox
- Released: February 1975
- Studio: Novasound (London); Scorpio (London)
- Genre: Rock; hard rock; rock and roll; rockabilly; country; disco
- Length: 36:39
- Label: Track; Decca
- Producer: John Alcock; John Entwistle

John Entwistle's Ox chronology
Rigor Mortis Sets In (1973)	Mad Dog (1975)	Too Late the Hero (1981)

Singles from Mad Dog
- 1. "Mad Dog" Released: 1975

Mad Dog is the fourth solo studio album by the English rock musician John Entwistle, who was the bassist for the Who at that time. It was his last solo studio album for six years, and the debut and sole studio album by his band John Entwistle's Ox.

Mad Dog didn't generate much interest, either in sales or among fans, in what sounded like and is often referred as to by fans as "the son of Rigor Mortis".

His next solo studio album Too Late the Hero (1981) would become his most successful whilst Mad Dog was his least successful solo album until the release of The Rock (1996).

The song "Cell Number 7", (which is a close relation to the Who's "Long Live Rock") detailed the Who's then recent brush with Canadian justice in 1974 after a hotel wrecking spree in Montreal while on their Quadrophenia tour.

== Critical reception ==
Professional ratings
Review scores
Source	Rating
AllMusic	link
Christgau's Record Guide	B−

AllMusic said that the album "Is enjoyable in short bursts, but it also makes a good case for the conventional wisdom that even the best bass players are only so-so as band leaders.", AllMusic also said that "He can't seem to tell his good jokes from the ones that sink without a trace, he sets his best songs right beside numbers that would have been best left in the rehearsal space, and for a guy who was one-third of England's greatest power trio (plus vocalist), he doesn't always know what to do with a large band."

== Track listing ==
All tracks are written by John Entwistle, except where noted.

Side one
No.	Title	Writer(s)	Length
1.	"I Fall to Pieces"		3:55
2.	"Cell Number 7"	John Entwistle; Tony Ashton	4:02
3.	"You Can Be So Mean"		3:55
4.	"Lady Killer"		3:29
5.	"Who in the Hell?"		3:34

Side two
No.	Title	Writer(s)	Length
6.	"Mad Dog"		5:27
7.	"Jungle Bunny"	Entwistle; Graham Deakin	4:03
8.	"I'm So Scared"		4:01
9.	"Drowning"		4:41
Total length:			36:39

Bonus tracks (2005 reissue)
No.	Title	Length
1.	"Mad Dog" (Single mix)	3:55
2.	"Cell Number 7" (Single mix)	4:07

== Personnel ==
Musicians

- John Entwistle – lead vocals, bass guitar, 8-string bass guitar, synthesizer
- Jimmy Ryan – guitar
- Mike Wedgwood – guitar, string arrangements
- Robert A. Johnson – guitar (tracks, 2, 6, 7)
- Graham Deakin – drums, percussion
- Eddie Jobson – piano, violin
- Tony Ashton – piano
- John Mealing – piano
- Mike Deacon – piano (2)
- Nashville Katz – string arrangements
- John Mumford – trombone
- Dick Parry – baritone saxophone
- Howie Casey – tenor saxophone
- Dave Caswell – trumpet
- Doreen Chanter – backing vocals
- Irene Chanter – backing vocals
- Juanita "Honey" Franklin – backing vocals

== Charts ==
Chart	Peak position
US Billboard 200	192
