= John Entwistle =

English musician and bassist (1944–2002)

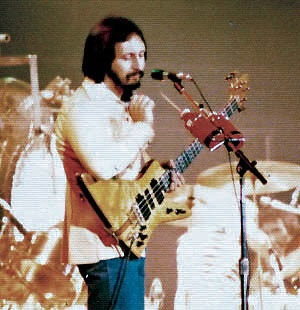
- Entwistle at Maple Leaf Gardens in Toronto, Ontario, Canada, 1976

Background information
- Also known as: The Ox; Thunderfingers; The Quiet One; Big Johnny Twinkle
- Born: John Alec Entwistle; 9 October 1944; Hammersmith, London, England
- Died: 27 June 2002 (aged 57) Paradise, Nevada, U.S.
- Genres: Rock; hard rock; power pop; proto-punk
- Occupations: Singer; songwriter; musician; composer; record producer
- Instruments: Bass guitar; vocals; French horn; trumpet
- Works: Solo; with the Who
- Years active: 1961–2002
- Labels: Track; Polydor; Decca; MCA; ATCO; WEA; Griffin; Rhino; Repertoire; King Biscuit Entertainment; J-Bird; Pulsar
- Formerly of: The Who; The Rock; The Best; Ringo Starr & His All-Starr Band

John Alec Entwistle (9 October 1944 – 27 June 2002) was an English singer, songwriter, musician, composer and record producer, best known as the bass guitarist for the rock band the Who. Entwistle's music career spanned over four decades. Nicknamed "The Ox" and "Thunderfingers", he was the band's only member with formal musical training, and also provided backing and occasional lead vocals plus some French horn or trumpet. Entwistle was inducted into the Rock and Roll Hall of Fame as a member of the Who in 1990.

Entwistle was the first member of the Who to begin a solo career, starting in 1971. He released seven solo studio albums, four compilation albums and two live albums. His best-selling studio album is Too Late the Hero (1981), and its title track is his best-selling single. Musicians who played on his albums include the Who's Keith Moon, Peter Frampton of Humble Pie, Joe Walsh of the Eagles, Leslie West of Mountain, Vivian Stanshall, Neil Innes, Zak Starkey, Howie Casey, Dick Parry, Jimmy McCulloch of Paul McCartney and Wings, Joe Vitale, and Tony Ashton.

Renowned for his musical abilities, Entwistle is widely regarded as one of the greatest and most influential rock bassists of all time. His instrumental approach featured pentatonic lead lines and a then-unusual treble-rich sound ("full treble, full volume"). He was voted as the greatest bass guitar player ever in a 2011 Rolling Stone readers' poll and, in 2020, the same magazine ranked him number three in its list of the "50 Greatest Bassists of All Time".

== Early life ==
John Alec Entwistle was born on 9 October 1944 at Queen Charlotte's Maternity Hospital in Hammersmith, West London, and brought up in Chiswick, Middlesex, which is now part of London. He was an only child. His father, Herbert (1915–2003), played the trumpet and his mother, Maud (née Lee) (29 November 1922 – 4 March 2011), played the piano. His parents' marriage failed soon after he was born, and he was mostly raised by his mother at his grandparents' house in South Acton. Divorce was uncommon in the 1940s, and this contributed to Entwistle becoming reserved and socialising little.

His musical career began at age 7, when he started taking piano lessons. He did not enjoy the experience and after joining Acton County Grammar School aged 11, switched to the trumpet, moving to the French horn when he joined the Middlesex Schools Orchestra. He met Pete Townshend in the second year of school, and the two formed a trad jazz band, the Confederates. The group only played one gig together, before they decided that rock and roll was a more attractive prospect. Entwistle, in particular, was having difficulty hearing his trumpet with rock bands, and decided to switch to playing guitar, but due to his large fingers, and also his fondness for the low guitar tones of Duane Eddy, he decided to take up the bass guitar instead. He made his own instrument at home, and soon attracted the attention of Roger Daltrey, who had been in the year above Entwistle at Acton County, but had been expelled and was working as an electrician's mate. Daltrey was aware of Entwistle from school, and asked him to join as a bassist for his band, the Detours.

== Career ==
=== The Who ===
After joining the Detours, Entwistle played a major role in encouraging Pete Townshend's budding talent on the guitar. In 1962, Townshend was hired as lead guitarist by Daltrey due to Entwistle. At this point the band consisted of Entwistle, Daltrey, Townshend, drummer Doug Sandom, a semi-professional player who was several years older than the others, and vocalist Colin Dawson. After Dawson left and was temporarily replaced, Daltrey fully relinquished the role of guitarist to Townshend in 1963 at Entwistle's recommendation, becoming the frontman and vocalist.

The band considered several changes of name, finally settling on the name the Who while Entwistle was still working as a tax clerk (temporarily performing as the High Numbers for seven months in 1964). When the band decided that the blond Daltrey needed to stand out more from the others, Entwistle dyed his naturally light brown hair black, and it remained so until the early 1980s. Around 1963, Entwistle played in a London band called the Initials for a short while; the band broke-up when a planned resident engagement in Spain fell through.

Entwistle picked up two nicknames during his career as a musician. He was nicknamed "the Ox" because of his strong constitution and seeming ability to "eat, drink or do more than the rest of them". He was also later nicknamed "Thunderfingers". Bill Wyman, bassist for the Rolling Stones, described him as "the quietest man in private but the loudest man on stage". Entwistle was one of the first to make use of Marshall Stacks in an attempt to hear himself over the noise of his band members, who famously leapt and moved about on the stage, with Townshend and Keith Moon smashing their instruments on numerous occasions (Moon even used explosives in his drum kit during one television performance on The Smothers Brothers Comedy Hour). Townshend later remarked that Entwistle started using Marshall amplification to hear himself over Moon's rapid-fire drumming style, and Townshend himself also had to use them just to be heard over Entwistle. They both continued expanding and experimenting with their rigs, until they were both using twin stacks with new experimental prototype 200 watt amps, at a time when most bands used 50–100 watt amplifiers with single cabinets. All of this quickly gained the Who a reputation for being "the loudest band on the planet"; they reached 126 decibels at a 1976 concert in London, listed in The Guinness Book of World Records as the loudest rock concert in history.

The band had a strong influence at the time on their contemporaries' choice of equipment, with Cream and the Jimi Hendrix Experience both following suit. Although they pioneered and directly contributed to the development of the "classic" Marshall sound (at this point their equipment was being built or tweaked to their personal specifications), they only used Marshall equipment for a few years. Entwistle eventually switched to using a Sound City rig, with Townshend later following suit. Townshend said that Jimi Hendrix, their new label mate, was influenced beyond just the band's volume. Both Entwistle and Townshend had begun experimenting with feedback from the amplifiers in the mid-1960s, and Hendrix did not begin destroying his instruments until after he had witnessed the Who's "auto-destructive art".

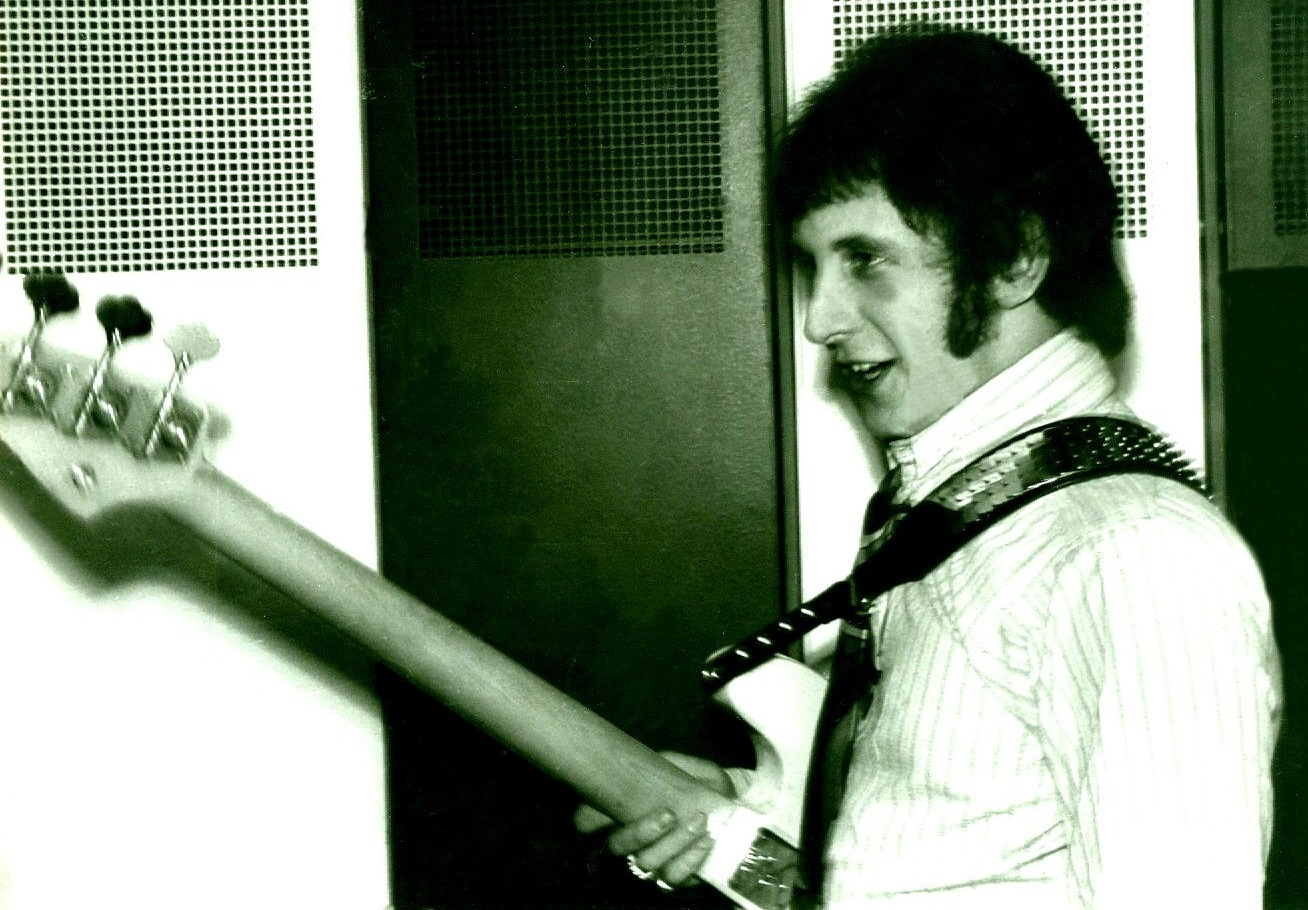
Entwistle backstage before a gig at Friedrich-Ebert-Halle in Ludwigshafen, Germany, 1967

Entwistle's wry and sometimes dark sense of humour clashed at times with Townshend's more introspective, intellectual work. Although he wrote songs on every Who studio album except for Quadrophenia (1973), Entwistle was frustrated at Daltrey not allowing him to sing them himself. As he said, "I got a couple [of songs] on per album but my problem was that I wanted to sing the songs and not let Roger sing them." This was a large part of the reason that he became the first member of the band to release a solo studio album, Smash Your Head Against the Wall (1971), which featured contributions from Keith Moon, Jerry Shirley of Humble Pie, Vivian Stanshall, Neil Innes and the Who's roadie, Dave "Cyrano" Langston.

Entwistle was the only member of the band to have had formal musical training. In addition to the bass guitar, he contributed backing vocals and performed the French horn (heard on "Pictures of Lily" and throughout Tommy), trumpet, piano, bugle, and Jew's harp, and on some occasions he sang the lead vocals on his compositions. He layered several horns to create the brass section as heard on songs such as "5:15", among others, while recording the Who's studio albums, and for concerts, arranged a horn section to perform with the band.

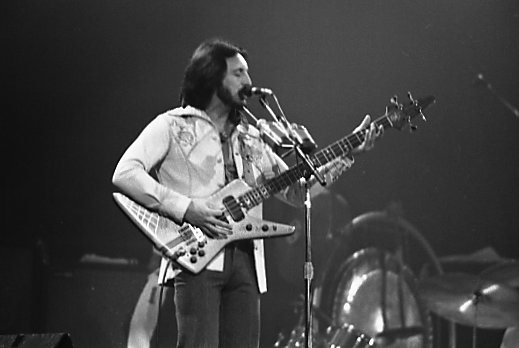
Entwistle performing with the Who at Maple Leaf Gardens in Toronto, Ontario, Canada, 1976

While Entwistle was known for being the quietest member of the Who, he in fact often exerted major influences on the rest of the band. For instance, Entwistle was the first member of the band to wear a Union Jack waistcoat. This piece of clothing later became one of Townshend's signature garments.

In 1974, he compiled Odds & Sods, a collection of unreleased Who material. Entwistle designed the cover art for the band's seventh studio album, The Who by Numbers (1975), and in a 1996 interview remarked that it had cost £30 to create, while the Quadrophenia cover, designed by Pete Townshend, had cost £16,000.

Entwistle also experimented throughout his career with 'bi-amping', where the high and low ends of the bass guitar are sent through separate signal paths, allowing for more control over the output. At one point his rig became so loaded down with speaker cabinets and processing gear that it was dubbed "little Manhattan", in reference to the towering, skyscraper-like stacks, racks and blinking lights.

==== Songwriting ====
While Townshend emerged as the Who's songwriter-in-chief, Entwistle began making distinctive contributions to the band's catalogue, beginning with "Whiskey Man" and "Boris the Spider" on the band's second studio album A Quick One (1966), continuing with "Doctor, Doctor" and "Someone's Coming" (1967); "Silas Stingy", "Heinz Baked Beans" and "Medac" from the band's third studio album The Who Sell Out (1967); "Dr. Jekyll & Mr. Hyde" (1968); and "Heaven and Hell", with which the Who opened their live shows between 1968 and 1970.

Entwistle wrote "Cousin Kevin" and "Fiddle About" for the Who's fourth studio album Tommy (1969) because Townshend had specifically requested Entwistle to write 'nasty songs' that he felt uncomfortable with. "My Wife", Entwistle's driving, comedic song about marital strife from the band's fifth studio album Who's Next (1971), also became a popular stage number. He wrote "Success Story" for The Who by Numbers (1975), for which he also drew the illustration on the album cover; "Had Enough", "905", and "Trick of the Light" for Who Are You (1978); "The Quiet One" and "You" for Face Dances (1981); and "It's Your Turn", "Dangerous" and "One at a Time" for It's Hard (1982), his final studio album with the Who.

=== Other work ===
==== 1970s ====
In May 1971, Entwistle became the first member of the band to release a solo studio album, Smash Your Head Against the Wall, which was born out of Entwistle's frustrations within the band, namely not having as many of his songs featured on their albums as he would've liked, and it features a guest appearance by the Who's drummer Keith Moon on one track ("No. 29 (External Youth)"), as well as strong musical influences from the band's work.

Entwistle self-produced the album and it was recorded at Trident Studios in Soho, London over 2 weeks, with a young Roy Thomas Baker engineering the album (his first work). Baker would later become known for his work as a producer for the rock band Queen, and the same studio piano that was used by Entwistle during the sessions for this album was later used by Freddie Mercury on "Bohemian Rhapsody". The album peaked at No. 126 on the US Billboard 200 but it failed to chart in his home country.

In November 1972, Entwistle released his second solo studio album Whistle Rymes. Entwistle co-produced the album with John Alcock, his first work with a producer after self-producing his debut studio album, Smash Your Head Against the Wall, and it was recorded at Island Studios in West London's Notting Hill district. The album features guitar contributions from both Peter Frampton of Humble Pie and Jimmy McCulloch (who would later join Paul McCartney and Wings).

The album sold around 175,000 copies, and peaked at No. 138 on the US Billboard 200 but as with his debut studio album it failed to chart in his home country.

In May 1973, released his third solo studio album Rigor Mortis Sets In, the second studio album to be co-produced by Entwistle and John Alcock, it consists of two 1950s rock and roll cover versions, one 1960s cover, a new version of the Entwistle song "My Wife" from the Who's fifth studio album Who's Next (1971), and new tracks (only six of the ten songs were original material). Rigor Mortis Sets In set in motion Entwistle assembling his own touring band during the increasing periods of the Who's inactivity.

Bearing the dedication "In Loving Memory of Rock 'n' Roll 1950–∞: Never Really Passed Away Just Ran Out of Time", Entwistle's affection for 1950s rock and roll was evident by cover versions of Elvis Presley's 1953 song "Hound Dog", and Little Richard's 1957 song "Lucille". As George Lucas had released American Graffiti (1973) at the same time as Rigor Mortis Sets In was released, creating a huge market for 1950s nostalgia, Entwistle's timing was uncannily prescient. In Entwistle's original material for the album, light whimsy prevailed over the darker (and more creative) vein of Smash Your Head Against the Wall and Whistle Rymes. The album was completed in less than three weeks, ultimately costing $10,000 in studio time and $4,000 on liquor bills.

Rigor Mortis Sets In had a rough launch due to its title and cover art. BBC Radio refused to play the album and banned it, ironically in part due to the influence of disc jockey (DJ) Jimmy Savile who had just suffered a death in his family. The album's US debut was problematic for MCA Records (Track's new American distributor), who insisted on appending the artist's name to the title, out of concern that the album's sales would be weak without the Entwistle name in the title. It peaked at No. 174 on the US Billboard 200.

In February 1975, Entwistle released his fourth solo studio album Mad Dog. It was his last solo studio album for six years, and the debut and sole studio album by his band John Entwistle's Ox. Mad Dog didn't generate much interest, either in sales or among fans, in what sounded like and is often referred as to by fans as "the son of Rigor Mortis".

The song "Cell Number 7", (which is a close relation to the Who's "Long Live Rock") detailed the Who's then recent brush with Canadian justice in 1974 after a hotel wrecking spree in Montreal while on their Quadrophenia tour.

==== 1980s ====
In November 1981, Entwistle released his fifth solo studio album Too Late the Hero. This was his only solo studio album of the 1980s and his last album to chart. The album peaked at No. 71 on the US Billboard 200, making it his best-selling album and his only album to reach the top 100.

"Talk Dirty" was the first single released from the album and it received some airplay in the US on album-oriented rock radio, peaking at No. 41 on the US Mainstream Rock Tracks chart. "Too Late the Hero" was the second single to be released from the album and it would be his only single to chart on the UK singles chart, peaking at No. 76. It also peaked at No. 101 on the US Billboard Bubbling Under Hot 100 chart, making it his best-selling single all round. "Too Late the Hero" was the only single from the album that had a music video filmed for it.

Entwistle co-produced the album with Dave "Cyrano" Langston, his first work with Langston since his debut studio album Smash Your Head Against the Wall (1971). It was recorded as a core trio of musicians that were Entwistle on bass guitar with Joe Walsh of the Eagles providing all guitar work and Walsh's former Barnstorm bandmate Joe Vitale on drums, with all three playing keyboards. Billy Nicholls also sang backing vocals on most of the tracks.

In 1984, he became one of the first artists besides Arlen Roth to record an instructional video for Roth's company Hot Licks Video.

The Rock recorded by the band of the same name, and later credited to Entwistle solo was recorded over a period of eighteen months between 1985 and 1986 at Entwistle's Hammerhead Studios in Gloucestershire. It was originally planned for release by WEA in 1986 but it was not officially released until ten years later. The album has been released in four different editions between 1996 and 2005, each time with different artwork.

The Rock was Entwistle's only studio album in which he did not sing lead or backing vocals on any tracks, a role performed instead by the American-born Canadian Henry Small, formerly of the rock band Prism.

The Who was preoccupied with recording The Who by Numbers during the spring of 1975 and did not do any touring for most of the year, so Entwistle spent the summer performing solo concerts. He also fronted the John Entwistle Band with band mate and business partner Steve Luongo on US club tours during the 1990s, and appeared with Ringo Starr & His All-Starr Band in 1995. A talented visual artist, Entwistle held regular exhibitions of his paintings, with many of them featuring the Who.

==== Later years ====
In 1990, Entwistle toured with the Best, a short-lived supergroup which included keyboardist Keith Emerson of Emerson, Lake & Palmer (ELP), guitarists Joe Walsh of the Eagles, Jeff "Skunk" Baxter of Steely Dan and the Doobie Brothers, and session drummer Simon Phillips. Towards the end of his career, he formed the John Entwistle Band with longtime friend, drummer Steve Luongo, and guitarist Mark Hitt, both formerly of Rat Race Choir. This evolved into the John Entwistle Band, with Godfrey Townsend replacing Mark Hitt on guitar and joining harmony vocals. In 1996, the band went on the "Left for Dead" tour with Alan St. Jon joining on keyboards. After Entwistle toured with the Who for Quadrophenia in 1996–97, the John Entwistle Band set off on the "Left for Dead – the Sequel" tour in late 1998, now with Gordon Cotten on keyboards. After this second venture, the band released an album of highlights from the tour, titled Left for Live and a studio album Music from Van-Pires in 2000. The album featured lost demos of Who drummer Keith Moon together with newly recorded parts by the band.

In 1995, Entwistle also toured and recorded with Ringo Starr in one of the incarnations of Starr's All-Starr Band. This one also featured Billy Preston, Randy Bachman of the Guess Who, and Mark Farner of Grand Funk Railroad. In this ensemble, he played and sang "Boris the Spider" as his Who showpiece, along with "My Wife". Toward the end of his career he used a Status Graphite Buzzard Bass, which he had designed. From 1999 to early 2002, he played as part of the Who. Entwistle also played at Woodstock '99 in Rome, New York, along with Mickey Hart of the Grateful Dead, being the only performers there to have taken the stage at the original Woodstock. As a side project, he played the bass guitar in a country rock studio album project of original songs called the Pioneers, with Mickey Wynne on lead guitar, Ron Magness on rhythm guitar and keyboards, Roy Michaels, Andre Beeka on vocals, and John Delgado playing drums. The album was released by Voiceprint Records. Shortly before his death, Entwistle had agreed to play some US dates with the band including Nashville's Grand Ole Opry, following his final upcoming tour with the Who.

In 2001, he played in Alan Parsons' Beatles tribute show A Walk Down Abbey Road. The show also featured Ann Wilson of Heart, Todd Rundgren, David Pack of Ambrosia, Godfrey Townsend, Steve Luongo and John Beck of It Bites. That year he also played with the Who at The Concert for New York City. He also joined forces again with the John Entwistle Band for an 8-gig tour. This time Chris Clark played keyboards. From January–February 2002, Entwistle played his last concerts with the Who in a handful of dates in England, the last being on 8 February at the Royal Albert Hall in South Kensington, London. In late 2002, an expanded 2-CD Left for Live Deluxe was released, highlighting the John Entwistle Band's performances.

==== Art ====
Between 1996 and 2002, Entwistle attended dozens of art openings in his honour. He chatted with each collector, personalising their art with a quote and a sketch of "Boris". In early 2002, Entwistle finished what was his last drawing. "Eyes Wide Shut" represented a new style for Entwistle. Featuring Jimi Hendrix, Pete Townshend, Jimmy Page of Led Zeppelin and Eric Clapton, Entwistle's style had evolved from simple line drawings and caricatures to a more lifelike representation of his subjects. He was more confident and relaxed with his art and ready to share that with his collectors.

Entwistle wrote this on one of his pictures:

Now ... ! I'm still the bass guitarist. If you're reading this bio at a show – don't forget to wave – I'm the one on the left. If you're reading this at an art show – Help support a starving Artist BUY SOMETHING!

== Personal life ==
Entwistle was married twice. In 1967, he married his childhood sweetheart, Alison Wise. He and Alison had a son, Christopher. Entwistle bought a large semi-detached home in Stanmore, northwest London, filling it with all sorts of extraordinary artefacts, ranging from suits of armour to a tarantula. His eccentricity and taste for the bizarre was to remain with him throughout his life, and when he finally moved out of the city in 1978, to Stow-on-the-Wold in Gloucestershire, his 17-bedroom Victorian manor, Quarwood, resembled a museum. It also housed one of the largest guitar collections belonging to any rock musician.

== Death and legacy ==
Entwistle died in Room 658 at the Hard Rock Hotel and Casino in Paradise, Nevada, on 27 June 2002, one day before the scheduled first show of the Who's 2002 United States tour. He was 57 years old. Entwistle had gone to bed that night with Alycen Rowse, a local stripper and groupie, who awoke the next morning to find Entwistle cold and unresponsive. The Clark County medical examiner determined that his death was due to a heart attack induced by an undetermined amount of cocaine. Entwistle already had severe cardiovascular disease and usually smoked 20 cigarettes a day.

Entwistle had undergone a medical examination for insurance purposes before the Who's 2002 tour started. The exam revealed high blood pressure and high cholesterol. Entwistle's authorised biographer Paul Rees has suggested that a more detailed physical examination would have revealed that three of his arteries were blocked and necessitated surgery.

His funeral was held at St Edward's Church in Stow-on-the-Wold, Gloucestershire, England, on 10 July 2002. His body was cremated and his ashes were buried privately in the grounds of his mansion, Quarwood. A memorial service was held on 24 October at St Martin-in-the-Fields, Trafalgar Square in the City of Westminster, London. Long time friend and band mate Steve Luongo was invited by the Who and Entwistle's family to deliver the eulogy.

Entwistle's collection of guitars and basses was auctioned at Sotheby's in London by his son, Christopher, to meet anticipated taxes on his father's estate. Entwistle's mansion, Quarwood, and some of his personal effects were later sold off to help pay inheritance tax.

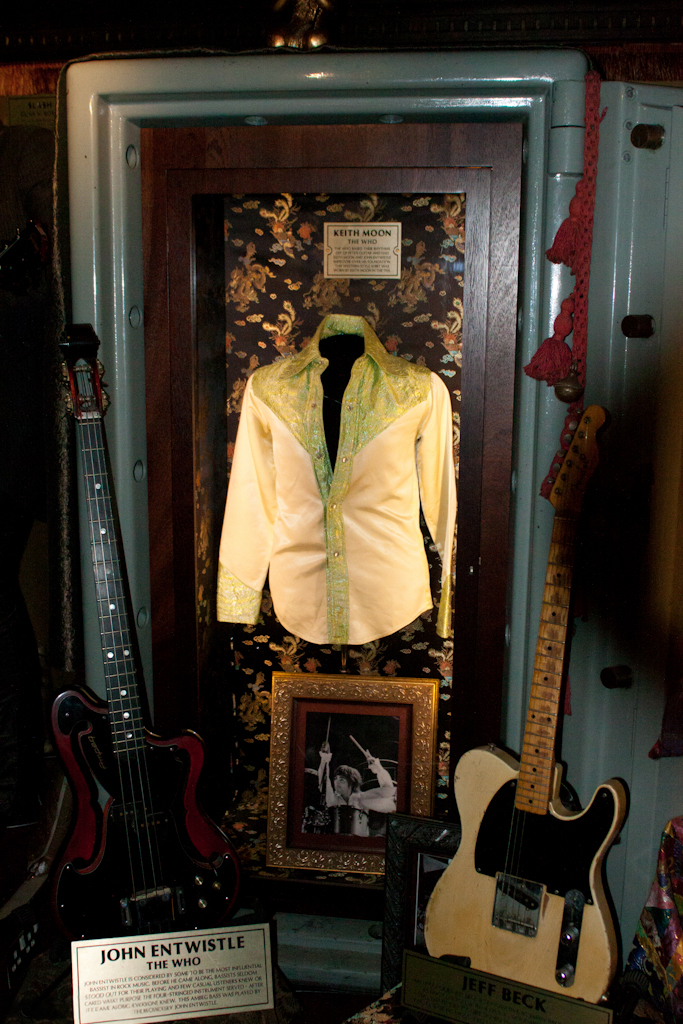
Display of Entwistle's bass guitar along with a shirt formerly owned by bandmate Keith Moon at Hard Rock Cafe, London

On Pete Townshend's website, Townshend and Roger Daltrey published a tribute, saying, "The Ox has left the building—we've lost another great friend. Thanks for your support and love. Pete and Roger."

One aspect of Entwistle's life that emerged after his death came as a surprise even to those closest to him, including the members of the Who. "It wasn't until the day of his funeral that I discovered that he'd spent most of his life as a Freemason", said Townshend.

Pino Palladino, who had previously played bass on several of Townshend's solo studio albums, took over for Entwistle onstage when the Who resumed their postponed US tour on 1 July 2002 at the Hollywood Bowl. Townshend and Daltrey spoke at length about their reaction to Entwistle's death. Some of their comments can be found on The Who Live in Boston DVD.

On the opening night of Rush's Vapor Trails tour, which began in Hartford, Connecticut on 28 June 2002 (the night after Entwistle's death), vocalist/bassist Geddy Lee dedicated the band's performance of the song "Between Sun and Moon" to Entwistle.

Pearl Jam's seventh studio album Riot Act, released in November 2002, was dedicated to Entwistle, among others.

Oasis played a cover version of "My Generation" during their Summer 2002 European Tour as a tribute to Entwistle.

In some concerts of the Red Hot Chili Peppers' By the Way Tour, such as the gig at Slane Castle in 2003, Flea got on stage wearing a version of the skeleton suit Entwistle wore during the Who's 1970 tour, as a tribute.

== Technique ==
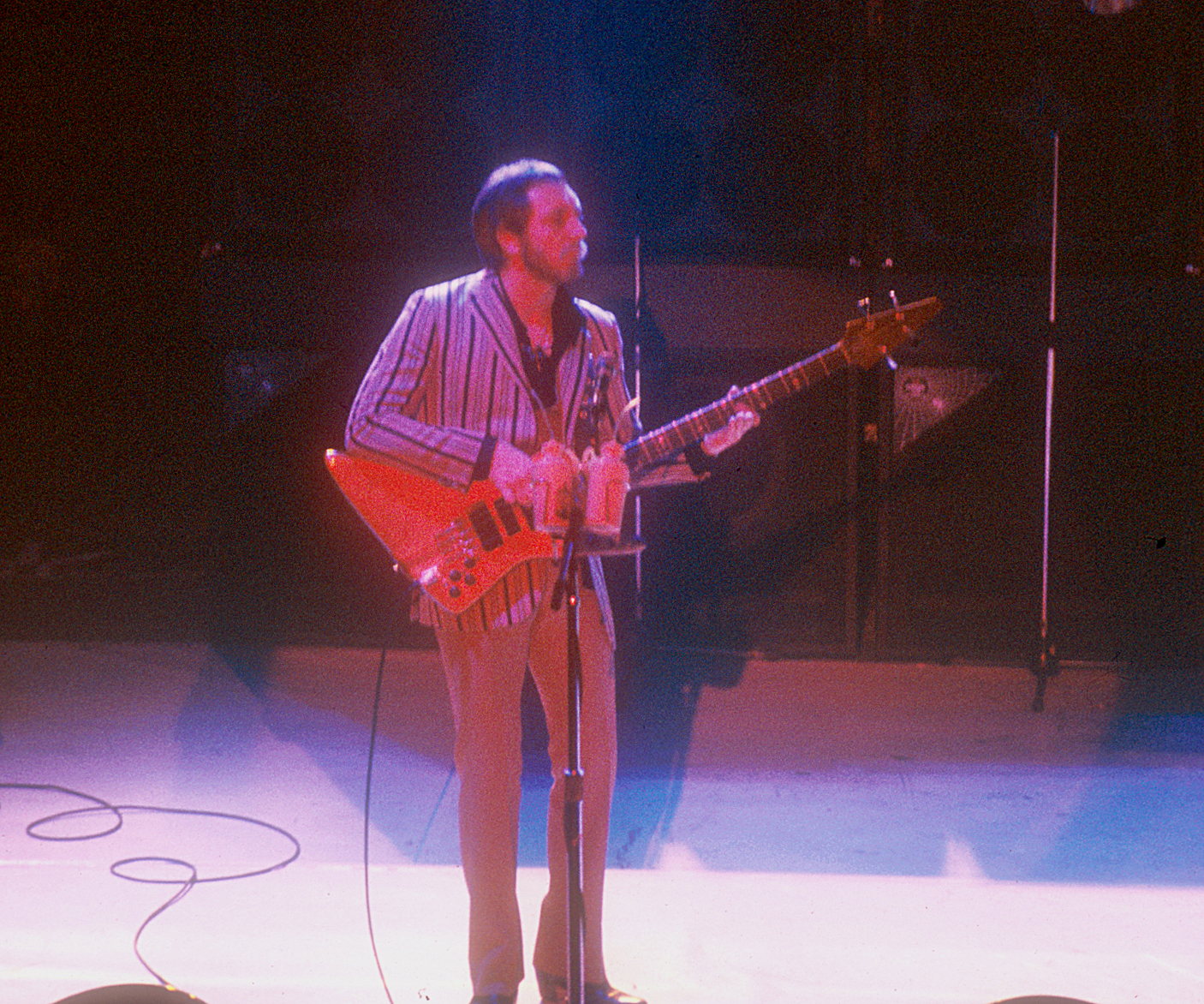
Entwistle performing with the Who at the Manchester Apollo in 1981

Entwistle's playing technique incorporated fingerstyle, plectrum, tapping, and the use of harmonics. He changed his style between songs and even during songs to alter the sound he produced. His fingering technique involved plucking strings very forcefully to produce a trebly, twangy sound. He changed his thumb position from pick-up to the E string and occasionally even positioned his thumb near the pick-up. His plectrum technique involved holding the plectrum between his thumb and forefinger, with the rest of his fingers outstretched for balance.

The Who's studio recordings seldom did justice to Entwistle's playing, in part because he was better heard in concert, where he and Pete Townshend frequently exchanged roles compared to a traditional rock group: Entwistle provided rapid melodic lines more typical of a lead guitarist, while Townshend anchored the songs with rhythmic guitar lines more typical of the steady pulse from a bassist. At the same time, Townshend noted how Entwistle provided the true rhythmic timekeeping in the band, while Keith Moon, with his flourishes around the kit, was more like a keyboardist. In 1989, Entwistle pointed out that, by modern standards, "the Who haven't got a proper bass player."

Entwistle also developed what he called a "typewriter" approach to playing the bass guitar. It involved positioning his right hand over the strings so all four fingers could be used to tap percussively on the strings, causing them to strike the fretboard with a distinctive twangy sound. This gave him the ability to play three or four strings at once, or to use several fingers on a single string. It allowed him to create passages that were both percussive and melodic. This method should not be confused with tapping or slapping, and in fact predates these techniques. Modern players such as Ryan Martinie of the heavy metal band Mudvayne have used similar techniques. Entwistle can be seen using this technique in Mike Gordon's documentary film, Rising Low (2002). Notable in his left-hand technique was his use of slides, positioning his left hand for octaves, and his use of the pentatonic when playing with the Who.

Entwistle was notorious for the extremely high volume at which he played bass guitar, going so far as to rig pick-ups to each string on his instruments. This led to him developing hearing loss, similar to Townshend. Although not as public about his problems as Townshend, he reputedly had to rely on lip reading to understand speech in his later years. Randy Bachman of Bachman–Turner Overdrive claimed how towards the end of Entwistle’s life, the bassist mostly played by feeling the rush of air from his giant amp stacks. Entwistle blamed his hearing loss on using headphones.

== Influence ==
Entwistle identified his influences as a combination of his school training on French horn, trumpet, and piano (giving his fingers strength and dexterity). Musicians who influenced him included rock and roll guitarist Duane Eddy, and American soul and R&B bassists such as James Jamerson. In turn, Entwistle has been a considerable influence on the playing styles and sounds used by generations of bassists that have followed him, including Tom Hamilton of Aerosmith, Brian Gibson of Lightning Bolt, Geezer Butler of Black Sabbath, Krist Novoselic of Nirvana, Geddy Lee of Rush, Billy Sheehan, Victor Wooten, Steve Harris of Iron Maiden, Tom Petersson of Cheap Trick, John Myung of Dream Theater and Chris Squire of Yes.

Entwistle continues to rank highly on polls in musicians' magazines or greatest and most influential bass guitarists. In 2000, Guitar magazine named him "Bassist of the Millennium" in a readers' poll. J. D. Considine ranked Entwistle No. 9 on his list of "Top 50 Bass Players". He was named the second best rock bassist on Creem's 1974 Reader Poll Results. In 2011, a Rolling Stone reader poll selected him as the No. 1 rock bassist of all time.

== Equipment ==
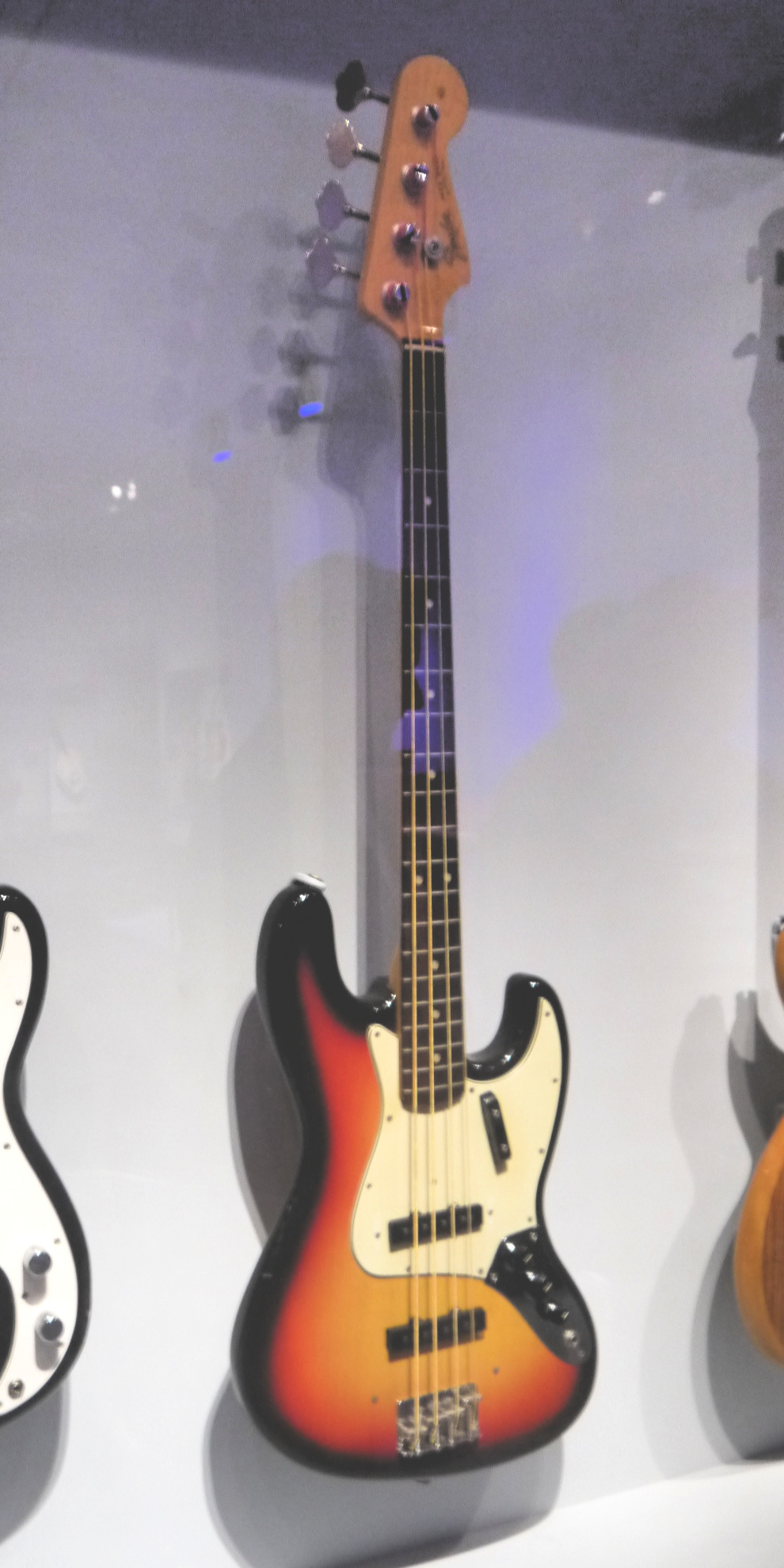
The Fender Jazz Bass used for the recording of "My Generation"

Entwistle collaborated with bass guitar manufacturers such as Alembic, Warwick, and Status Graphite. His bass solo on the "My Generation" single was a Fender Jazz Bass with stock tapewound strings.

Entwistle's collection of guitars and basses was auctioned at Sotheby's in May 2003.

== Discography ==
Solo studio albums

- Smash Your Head Against the Wall (1971)
- Whistle Rymes (1972)
- Rigor Mortis Sets In (1973)
- Mad Dog (1975)
- Too Late the Hero (1981)

with the Rock

- The Rock (1996)

with the John Entwistle Band

- Music from Van-Pires (2000)
