= Amazing Journey: The Story of The Who =

- Cover to the DVD release
- Directed by: Murray Lerner; Paul Crowder
- Written by: Mark Monroe
- Produced by: Nigel Sinclair; Robert Rosenberg; Murray Lerner
- Starring: Roger Daltrey; Pete Townshend; John Entwistle; Keith Moon
- Narrated by: Paul Crowder
- Cinematography: Matteo Passigato
- Edited by: Paul Crowder; Pagan Harleman; David Zieff
- Music by: The Who
- Production company: Spitfire Pictures
- Distributed by: Universal Pictures
- Release date: 14 September 2007 (Toronto International Film Festival)
- Country: United Kingdom
- Language: English

Amazing Journey: The Story of The Who is a 2007 documentary film by Murray Lerner and Paul Crowder about English rock and roll band the Who. The film features new interviews with band members Roger Daltrey, John Entwistle, Kenney Jones, and Pete Townshend, as well as Sting, The Edge, Noel Gallagher, Eddie Vedder, Steve Jones and others, as well as rare photos of the four members of the band, and archival live footage of performances dating back to 1964. A soundtrack accompanying the film also serves as a greatest-hits compilation for the band.

The two-DVD set includes footage not in earlier documentaries, including film from the 1970 Leeds University appearance, never-seen-before footage of a show in Copenhagen that shows Daltrey leaving the stage because the performance of the other members of the Who broke down into chaotic noise due to amphetamines – which resulted in a fight between Daltrey and Moon backstage and Daltrey being kicked out of the band temporarily – and a 1964 performance at the Railway Hotel when they were the High Numbers.

The film was nominated for a 2009 Grammy Award. An exclusive three disc set was available only at Best Buy retailers with a third disc featuring the majority of their performance on 8 December 1979 at Chicago's International Amphitheatre.

== Disc 1 ==
=== Chapters ===
The film is divided in four "sides" of two LP discs. The chapters are named after lyrics from the Who's songs, while "Overture", "When I Was a Boy", "Young Man Blues", "So Sad About Us" and "Music Must Change" are titles of the Who's songs.

- SIDE 1
1. Overture
2. When I Was a Boy
3. He's Your Leader, He's Your Guide
4. Young Man Blues
5. Who the Fuck Are You?
6. Dressed Right For a Beach Fight
7. In Your Hand You Hold Your Only Friend
8. I'm the Guy in the Sky
9. So Sad About Us

The first "side" details the origins of the Who, including: their thoughts of World War II in their lives and on England in general; how and why the Who became a Mod band and some details of the Mod lifestyle; how the four members of the band got together; Kit Lambert's and Chris Stamp's influence on the band; and their first hit single ("I Can't Explain") and album (My Generation).

- SIDE 2
1. They Tried and Tried and Tried
2. Substitute Me For Him
3. I Can See For Miles and Miles
4. Teenage Wasteland
5. The Music Must Change
6. What Is Happening in His Head?

The second "side" focuses on the band's struggle to be successful; the Monterey Pop Festival; their experiences with psychedelic drugs and how they influenced Townshend's music and lyric writing; Meher Baba's influence on Pete Townshend's life; and the release of Tommy.

- SIDE 3
1. No One Knows What It's Like
2. I'm Remembering Distant Memories...
3. Can You See the Real Me?
4. You Only Became What We Made You
5. I Don't Suppose You Would Remember Me?
6. Just Want to be Making Daily Records...

The third "side" details the Who's transition from the 1960s to the 1970s: Pete coming up with his newest project, the Lifehouse rock opera, which was later abandoned and its songs formed the Who's most successful album, Who's Next; Quadrophenia; Lambert's and Stamp's frictions between themselves and the band; Keith Moon's death and the band's decision to bring in drummer Kenney Jones, keyboardist John "Rabbit" Bundrick, and continue after Moon's death; The Who concert disaster (which 11 people were killed); and Pete ultimately dissolving the band.

- SIDE 4
1. Rock Is Dead They Say
2. Let Your Tears Flow, Let Your Past Go
3. The Past Is Calling
4. Pick Up My Guitar and Play
5. Closing Credits/My Generation

The final fourth "side" does not focus much on the period between Pete's dissolving the band in 1983 and their return in 1996, but it details: Entwistle's financial problems after the break-up of the band; Daltrey and Townshend's decision to get the Who back together to help Entwistle; how they stole the show at The Concert For New York City; John's death in 2002; Pete's having to face allegations for possession of child pornography material; and how Entwistle's death actually changed Daltrey's and Townshend's relationship for the best.

== Disc 2 ==
=== Six Quick Ones ===
"Six Quick Ones" is a collection of six more mini documentaries, giving each band member more individual air time and delving into specific elements of the Who's artistry. Together, these run close to 90 minutes.

- ROGER
- JOHN
- PETE
- KEITH

The compact biographies of Roger, John, Pete, and Keith are all from the same pool as Amazing Journey proper and contain more performance footage, but with a specific intention of getting to the heart of what made each individual player sound the way they did.

- WHO ART YOU?

"Who Art You" explores how the band joined the mod movement and its pop-art leanings. It includes bits of the commercial they did for Coca-Cola, which then lead to The Who Sell Out. This features commentary from Richard Barnes, author of many a Who-related book, including the quintessential photo book on the youth movement, simply titled "Mods".

- WHO'S BACK

"Who's Back" is a mini-documentary on the recording of "Real Good Looking Boy" for the Who's 2004 greatest hits compilation – Then and Now -, and it was captured by D.A. Pennebaker, the director who filmed Bob Dylan's Dont Look Back and filmed the Who for Monterey Pop, joined by Chris Hegedus and Nick Doob. The band asked bassist Greg Lake of Emerson, Lake & Palmer to join Roger, Pete, Simon Townshend, Zak Starkey and John "Rabbit" Bundrick for these sessions.

=== Scrapbook ===
21 more minutes are given to "The Scrapbook," deleted and extended stories from the documentary. These are in five segments:

1. Dinner With Moon – Manager Bill Curbishley's story of an extraordinary Keith Moon bender and John Entwistle's response to it.
2. A Legal Matter – Shel Talmy, Glyn Johns and Chris Stamp recall the contractual fight between Talmy and the band.
3. Won't Get Fooled Again – Pete Townshend relates the real inspiration behind one of his more popular numbers.
4. Cincinnati: The Whole Story – Curbishley relates in full his perception of what happened when 11 concert-goers got trampled to death at a show in 1979.
5. Royal Albert Hall 2000 – Noel Gallagher's amusing anecdote about being invited to play with the guys at a charity gig.

=== The High Numbers at the Railway Hotel 1964 ===
"The High Numbers at the Railway Hotel" is nearly 8 minutes of the recently unearthed footage of the band in 1964 – what was left of the original film was in possession of Roger Daltrey – playing two R&B covers uninterrupted. This very early film was shot for a proposed film Kit Lambert and Chris Stamp wanted to make, a chronicle of an up-and-coming rock band that never happened. These 8 minutes are what's left of the uncompleted film.

== Disc 3 ==
There was a limited edition 3-DVD version. The third disc was Live in Chicago 1979, which was 90 minutes long.

1. Substitute
2. I Can't Explain
3. Baba O'Riley
4. The Punk and the Godfather
5. My Wife
6. Sister Disco
7. Behind Blue Eyes
8. Music Must Change
9. Drowned
10. 5:15
11. Pinball Wizard
12. Long Live Rock
13. Sparks
14. The Real Me
15. How Can You Do It Alone

== Reception ==
On review aggregator website Rotten Tomatoes, the film holds an approval rating of 80% based on 5 reviews, with an average rating of 6.5/10.
