= The Who Tour 1980 =

1980 concert tour by the Who

- Tour by The Who
- Tour program cover
- Location: Europe; United States; Canada
- Associated album: Who Are You
- Start date: 26 March 1980
- End date: 16 July 1980
- Legs: 3
- No. of shows: 37 in North America; 6 in Europe; 43 in total

The Who concert chronology
- The Who Tour 1979 (1979); The Who Tour 1980 (1980); The Who Tour 1981 (1981)

The Who Tour 1980 was the Who's second concert tour since the death of original drummer Keith Moon, supporting their 1978 album Who Are You.

== History ==
Aside from six warm-up shows in Europe, the tour focused primarily on the areas of North America not covered in the band's previous tour, which had focused on the northeastern United States. The set list was very similar to what they played on that tour, save the omission of "The Punk and the Godfather", which was only performed once in 1980. "Relay" was played for the first time since their 1972 European tour, and the group also briefly resurrected "Getting In Tune" for one show during the European warm-up tour, although it did not remain in the act. Yet-unreleased songs "How Can You Do It Alone" and "Dance It Away" returned from the previous tour as well, with the latter having developed into a full song similar to the bonus track on the reissue of Townshend's 1982 solo album All the Best Cowboys Have Chinese Eyes. A very early version of "Another Tricky Day" from the band's next album Face Dances also featured in one of the band's jams during "Dance It Away" in Los Angeles.

As in the second half of 1979, the band employed a brass section, which was showcased in numbers such as "Music Must Change", "Drowned", and "5.15", among others. Notable Pink Floyd sideman Dick Parry handled saxophone duties on this tour.

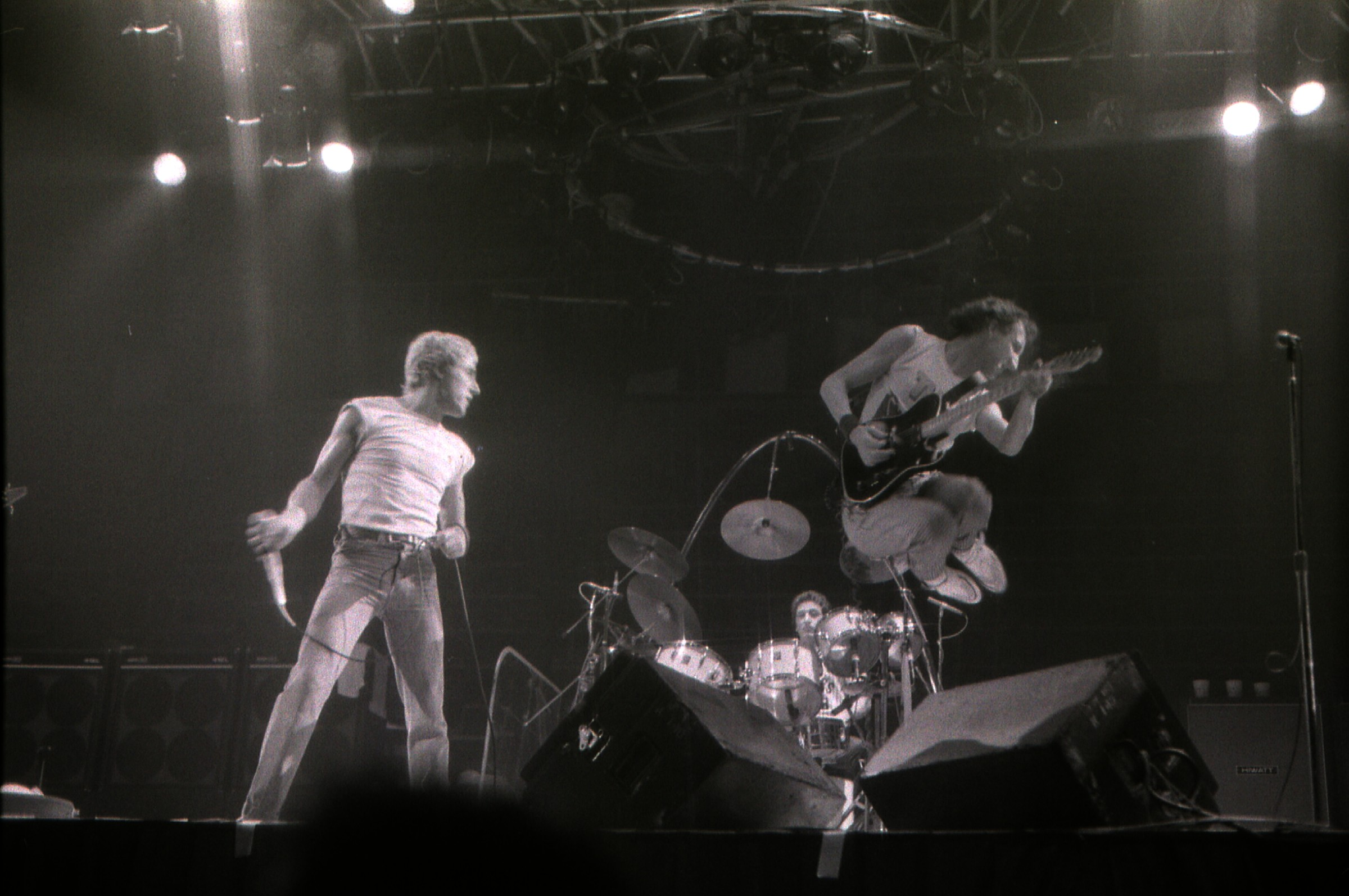
The Who live in Toronto, 1980

== Tour band ==
- Roger Daltrey – lead vocals, tambourine, harmonica
- Pete Townshend – lead guitar, vocals, bass guitar
- John Entwistle – bass guitar, 8-string bass, vocals
- Kenney Jones – drums

Additional musicians

- John "Rabbit" Bundrick – keyboards, piano, tambourine, backing vocals
- Dick Parry – saxophone
- Reg Brooks – trombone
- Dave Caswell – trumpet

== Typical set lists ==
=== First European leg ===
This short leg started on 26 March 1980 at the Grugahalle in Essen, West Germany and ended on 1 April 1980 at the Festhalle Frankfurt in Frankfurt. Here is a fairly typical set list (all songs written by Pete Townshend unless otherwise specified):

1. "Substitute"
2. "I Can't Explain"
3. "Baba O'Riley"
4. "My Wife" (John Entwistle)
5. "Sister Disco"
6. "Behind Blue Eyes"
7. "Music Must Change"
8. "Drowned"
9. "Who Are You"
10. "5.15"
11. "Pinball Wizard"
12. "See Me, Feel Me"
13. "Long Live Rock"
14. "My Generation"
15. "Sparks" (not played on 26 and 27 March)
16. "I Can See for Miles" (not played on 30 March)
17. "Won't Get Fooled Again"

Other songs occasionally played were:

- "Getting In Tune" (Performed on 27 March)
- "Summertime Blues" (Eddie Cochran, Jerry Capehart) (Performed on 26 March)
- "The Relay" (Performed on 26 and 27 March)
- "Dancing in the Street" (Marvin Gaye, William "Mickey" Stevenson, Ivy Jo Hunter) (Performed on 26 and 30 March)
- "The Real Me" (Performed on 27, 28, and 30 March and 1 April)
- "Young Man Blues" (Mose Allison) (Performed on 27 and 31 March)
- "Shakin' All Over" (Johnny Kidd) (Performed on 30 March)
- "Let's See Action" (Performed on 30 March)
- "Dance It Away" (Performed on 30 March)
- "Big Boss Man" (Al Smith, Luther Dixon) (Performed on 31 March)
- "Dreaming from the Waist" (Performed on 1 April)

There were some set list substitutions, variations, and order switches during the tour.

=== First North American leg ===
This leg began on 14 April at the Pacific Coliseum in Vancouver and ended on 7 May at the Montreal Forum. Here is a fairly typical set list (all songs written by Pete Townshend unless otherwise specified):

1. "Substitute"
2. "I Can't Explain"
3. "Baba O'Riley"
4. "My Wife" (John Entwistle)
5. "Sister Disco"
6. "Behind Blue Eyes"
7. "Drowned"
8. "Who Are You"
9. "5.15"
10. "Pinball Wizard"
11. "See Me, Feel Me"
12. "Long Live Rock"
13. "My Generation"
14. "I Can See for Miles"
15. "Sparks"
16. "Won't Get Fooled Again"
17. "The Real Me"

Other songs occasionally performed were:

- "Music Must Change" (Performed on 14, 16, 18, 20, 23, and 30 April and 6 May)
- "Dreaming from the Waist" (Performed on 15, 19, 20, 22, 24, 26, and 29 April and 2, 3, and 7 May)
- "Summertime Blues" (Eddie Cochran, Jerry Capehart) (Performed on 14, 18, 23 and 29 April; and 5 May)
- "Dancing in the Street" (Marvin Gaye, William "Mickey" Stevenson, Ivy Jo Hunter) (Performed on 15, 18, 22, 24 and 28 April; and 2 and 6 May)
- "Young Man Blues" (Mose Allison) (Performed on 15, 19, 22 and 23 April; and 2 and 6 May)
- "Dance It Away" (Performed on 18, 24, and 26 April and 2 and 6 May)
- "Shakin' All Over" (Johnny Kidd) (Performed on 16 and 26 April)
- "Magic Bus" (Performed on 19 and 26 April)
- "The Relay" (Performed on 20, 24, and 28 April and 3, 5, and 7 May)
- "How Can You Do It Alone" (Performed on 28 April)
- "Let's See Action" (Performed on 28 April)
- "Pretty Vacant" (Sex Pistols) (Performed on 28 April)
- "The Punk and the Godfather" (Performed on 28 April)
- "Going Down" (Don Nix) (loose version) (Performed on 28 April)

There were some set list substitutions, variations, and order switches during the tour. "See Me, Feel Me" often followed "Sparks" instead of "Pinball Wizard" and the band frequently rotated "Music Must Change", "Dreaming from the Waist" and "The Relay" as the seventh song of the set.

=== Second North American leg ===
The band returned after a six-week break for the second leg of the tour, which began on 18 June at the San Diego Sports Arena. This leg included two shows at The Forum in Inglewood, California, and five more at the Los Angeles Sports Arena and ended before a huge crowd at Toronto's CNE Stadium on 16 July, the group's last performance until the following January. At the invitation of Pete Townshend, Willie Nile accompanied the Who on their summer of 1980 - Second North American Leg as an opening act. Here is a fairly typical set list (all songs written by Pete Townshend unless otherwise specified):

1. "Substitute"
2. "I Can't Explain"
3. "Baba O'Riley"
4. "My Wife" (John Entwistle)
5. "Sister Disco"
6. "Behind Blue Eyes"
7. "Dreaming from the Waist" (Replaced by "Music Must Change" after 20 June)
8. "Drowned"
9. "Who Are You"
10. "5.15"
11. "Pinball Wizard"
12. "See Me, Feel Me"
13. "Long Live Rock"
14. "My Generation"
15. "Sparks" (dropped after 7 July)
16. "Won't Get Fooled Again"
17. "The Real Me"

Encores (variations of the following list):

- "Summertime Blues" (Eddie Cochran, Jerry Capehart)
  - Performed on 18, 23, 27, 28 and 30 June; and 2, 3, 7, 9, 11 and 16 July.
- "I Can See for Miles" (Performed on 18, 20, 27, and 28 June and 2, 3, 7, 9, 10, 11, 13, and 14 July)
- "Naked Eye" (Performed on 18, 21, and 28 June and 2, 3, 10, 11, 13, 14, and 16 July)
- "Dance It Away"
  - Performed on 18, 20 and 24 June; and 16 July.
- "Dancing in the Street" (Marvin Gaye, William "Mickey" Stevenson, Ivy Jo Hunter)
  - Performed on 20 and 24 June; and 16 July.
- "Young Man Blues" (Mose Allison)
  - Performed on 20 June and 10 July.
- "Another Tricky Day"
  - Performed on 20 June.
- "Shakin' All Over" (Johnny Kidd)
  - Performed on 21 June.
- "The Relay"
  - Performed on 21 and 24 June; and 13 July.
- "You Belong To Us"
  - Performed on 23 June.
- "Twist and Shout" (Phil Medley, Bert Russell)
  - Performed on 23 and 28 June; and 7, 9, 14 and 16 July.
- "Magic Bus"
  - Performed on 24 June.

There were some set list substitutions, variations, and order switches during the tour. "Dreaming from the Waist" was played in place of "Music Must Change" in the first two shows of this leg and "See Me, Feel Me" occasionally followed "Sparks" instead of "Pinball Wizard".

== Tour dates ==
Date	City	Country	Venue
Europe
26 March 1980	Essen	West Germany	Grugahalle
27 March 1980	Essen	West Germany	Grugahalle
28 March 1980	Zürich	Switzerland	Hallenstadion
30 March 1980	Vienna	Austria	Wiener Stadthalle
31 March 1980	Munich	West Germany	Olympiahalle
1 April 1980	Frankfurt	West Germany	Festhalle Frankfurt
First North America Leg
14 April 1980	Vancouver	Canada	Pacific Coliseum
15 April 1980	Seattle	United States	Seattle Center Coliseum
16 April 1980	Seattle	United States	Seattle Center Coliseum
18 April 1980	Oakland	United States	Oakland–Alameda County Coliseum Arena
19 April 1980	Oakland	United States	Oakland–Alameda County Coliseum Arena
20 April 1980	Oakland	United States	Oakland–Alameda County Coliseum Arena
22 April 1980	Salt Lake City	United States	Salt Palace
23 April 1980	Denver	United States	McNichols Sports Arena
24 April 1980	Denver	United States	McNichols Sports Arena
26 April 1980	Kansas City	United States	Kemper Arena
28 April 1980	St. Louis	United States	Checkerdome
29 April 1980	Ames	United States	Hilton Coliseum
30 April 1980	Saint Paul	United States	Saint Paul Civic Center
2 May 1980	Saint Paul	United States	Saint Paul Civic Center
3 May 1980	Chicago	United States	International Amphitheatre
5 May 1980	Toronto	Canada	Maple Leaf Gardens
6 May 1980	Toronto	Canada	Maple Leaf Gardens
7 May 1980	Montreal	Canada	Montreal Forum
Second North America Leg
18 June 1980	San Diego	United States	San Diego Sports Arena
20 June 1980	Inglewood	United States	The Forum
21 June 1980	Inglewood	United States	The Forum
23 June 1980	Los Angeles	United States	Los Angeles Memorial Sports Arena
24 June 1980	Los Angeles	United States	Los Angeles Memorial Sports Arena
26 June 1980	Los Angeles	United States	Los Angeles Memorial Sports Arena
27 June 1980	Los Angeles	United States	Los Angeles Memorial Sports Arena
28 June 1980	Los Angeles	United States	Los Angeles Memorial Sports Arena
30 June 1980	Phoenix	United States	ASU Univ. Activity Center
2 July 1980	Dallas	United States	Reunion Arena
3 July 1980	Austin	United States	Frank Erwin Center
5 July 1980	Houston	United States	The Summit
7 July 1980	Baton Rouge	United States	LSU Assembly Center
9 July 1980	Atlanta	United States	Omni Coliseum
10 July 1980	Memphis	United States	Mid-South Coliseum
11 July 1980	Lexington	United States	Rupp Arena
13 July 1980	Greensboro	United States	Greensboro Coliseum
14 July 1980	Hampton	United States	Hampton Roads Coliseum
16 July 1980	Toronto	Canada	Exhibition Stadium

== See also ==
- List of The Who tours and performances
