= The Who Tour 1979 =

1979 concert tour by the Who

- Tour by The Who
- Poster to the concert in Pittsburgh, US
- Associated album: Who Are You
- Start date: 2 May 1979
- End date: 28 December 1979
- Legs: 5
- No. of shows: 21 in North America; 14 in Europe; 35 in total

The Who concert chronology
- The Who by Numbers Tour (1975–76); The Who Tour 1979 (1979); The Who Tour 1980 (1980)

The Who Tour 1979 was the Who's first concert tour after the death of original drummer Keith Moon. The tour supported their 1978 album Who Are You, and consisted of concerts in Europe and the United States and acknowledged the band's return to live performance.

== History ==
Following Keith Moon's death in September 1978, the Who decided to continue as a band, recruiting former Small Faces drummer Kenney Jones; keyboardist John "Rabbit" Bundrick was also added to the line-up for live performances, adding another element to the band's sound. The post-Moon incarnation of the Who played as a five-piece for seven shows, the first occurring on 2 May at the Rainbow Theatre in London.

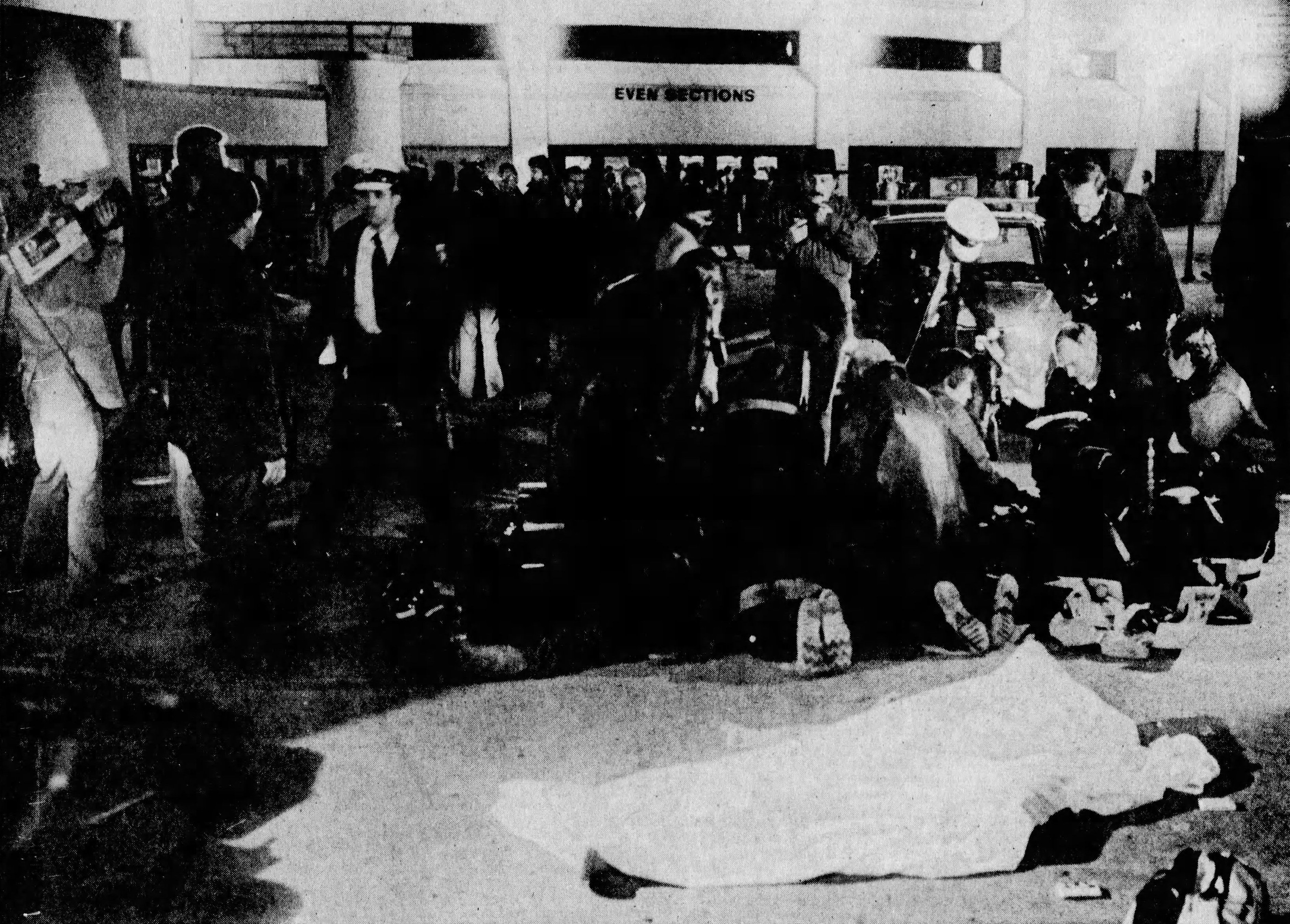
First responders attend to stampede victims outside Cincinnati's Riverfront Coliseum.

In September, the group made their first trip to the United States since 1976 for a series of shows at the Capitol Theatre in Passaic, New Jersey, and Madison Square Garden in New York City. A horn section was introduced to the band's act for the first time around this time. It would be retained through 1980. They returned to the States in November for an official tour, which was marred by tragedy when 11 fans were killed and 26 others were injured at a crowd crush before a concert at Riverfront Coliseum in Cincinnati on 3 December. This led to the banning of festival seating in Cincinnati and many other cities and states around the United States for a considerable period. The disaster also caused a scheduled concert for 17 December in Providence, Rhode Island, to be cancelled, leading to a second show in Landover, Maryland (the first was on 13 December) to be scheduled in its place. The group ended the year with a benefit appearance at the Hammersmith Odeon, London, on 28 December as part of the Concerts for the People of Kampuchea.

The band added three new songs from Who Are You in 1979, "Who Are You," "Sister Disco," and "Music Must Change"; John Entwistle's "Trick of the Light" was also played occasionally, with Entwistle playing 8 string bass and Pete Townshend also playing a standard bass guitar. The horn section also allowed numbers like "5:15" and "Drowned" (now sung by Townshend) to be reintroduced to the act. Meanwhile, 1979 shows are known among Who fans for new material that Townshend introduced on some nights during jams, most of which did not see release until later on. Some notable songs that evolved from these jams are "Cat's in the Cupboard" and "I Am an Animal" from Townshend's 1980 album Empty Glass, as well as "How Can You Do It Alone" from the Who's 1981 album Face Dances, and "Dance It Away," a bonus track on the reissued edition of Townshend's 1982 album All the Best Cowboys Have Chinese Eyes.

== Live releases ==
Live material from 1979 has appeared on the following:

- The three-disc version of the Who biographical film Amazing Journey: The Story of The Who includes the majority of the band's show of 8 December at the International Amphitheatre in Chicago.
- The version of "How Can You Do It Alone" from the Face Dances reissue also comes from the Chicago show.
- "5:15", "My Wife", "Music Must Change", and "Pinball Wizard" from the Thirty Years of Maximum R&B Live video and DVD come from the same Chicago show.
- "Dancing in the Street" from the Won't Get Fooled Again EP was recorded at The Spectrum in Philadelphia on 11 December.
- "Baba O'Riley", "Sister Disco", "Behind Blue Eyes", "See Me, Feel Me" from the Concerts for the People of Kampuchea album were recorded at the Hammersmith Odeon in London on 28 December. "Sister Disco", "Behind Blue Eyes", and "See Me, Feel Me" appear in the film.
- 25 songs, primarily from the Pontiac Silverdome on December 7, 1979 with four additional tracks coming from the Philadelphia Spectrum three days later, were included on the 2025 Super Deluxe Edition of Who Are You

== Tour band ==
- Roger Daltrey – lead vocals, tambourine, harmonica
- John Entwistle – bass guitar, 8-string bass, vocals
- Pete Townshend – lead guitar, vocals, bass guitar
- Kenney Jones – drums

Additional musicians

- John "Rabbit" Bundrick – keyboards, piano, tambourine, backing vocals
- Reg Brooks – trombone
- Howie Casey – saxophone (mid-1979)
- Dave Caswell – trumpet
- Dick Parry – saxophone (late 1979)

== Typical set lists ==
=== First UK/Europe leg ===
This "leg" started from 2 May 1979 at the Rainbow Theatre in London and went on until 1 September 1979 at the Zeppelinfeld in Nuremberg. Here is a fairly typical set list for this leg (actually taken from a concert at the Arenes de Frejus in Frejus on 12 May 1979). This leg featured the first performances of four songs from the band's most recent album, Who Are You: "Who Are You", "Trick of the Light", "Sister Disco" and "Music Must Change". All songs written by Pete Townshend unless otherwise specified.

1. "Substitute"
2. "I Can't Explain"
3. "Baba O'Riley"
4. "The Punk and the Godfather"
5. "Boris the Spider" (John Entwistle)
6. "Sister Disco"
7. "Music Must Change"
8. "Behind Blue Eyes"
9. "Dreaming from the Waist" (dropped after 18 August)
10. "Pinball Wizard"
11. "See Me, Feel Me"
12. "Long Live Rock" (not played on 1 September)
13. "Bargain" (dropped after 8 June)
14. "Who Are You"
15. "My Generation"
16. "Join Together"
17. "My Generation Blues" (dropped after 9 June)
18. "Magic Bus"
19. "Keyboard Bridge" (Townshend and John Bundrick; dropped after 18 August)
20. "Won't Get Fooled Again"

Encores (variations of the following list):

- "The Real Me"
  - Performed every show except 8 June.
- "Summertime Blues" (Eddie Cochran, Jerry Capehart)
  - Performed on 12, 16 and 17 May; 8 and 9 June; and 18 August.
- "Young Man Blues" (Mose Allison)
  - Performed on 13 and 17 May; and 8 June.
- "Shakin' All Over" (Johnny Kidd)
  - Performed on 13 May.
- "My Wife" (Entwistle)
  - Performed on 1 September.

There were some set list substitutions, variations, and order switches during the tour. "Behind Blue Eyes" switched places with "Music Must Change" after the second concert. "Bargain" was dropped after a concert in Glasgow, Scotland, on 8 June 1979. Also, some other songs were played which are not in the above lists:

- "Trick of the Light" (Entwistle)
  - Performed on 18 August and 1 September.
- "5:15"
  - Performed on 18 August and 1 September.
- "Drowned" (Townshend on vocals)
  - Performed on 18 August and 1 September.
- "Blue Black White" (unreleased Who song)
  - Performed on 1 September.

=== First US leg ===
This leg was one of the shorter ones of the tour, only lasting from 10 to 18 September (two nights at the Capitol Theatre in Passaic, New Jersey, and five nights at the Madison Square Garden in New York City), but it was also the one with the most set list variations. Nearly nightly, Townshend was improvising and incorporating new songs into the set list, such as "Dance It Away", "That's Rock And Roll", "I'm London", "Cat's in the Cupboard" and others. This particular set list is taken from the second show in New York, 14 September 1979. All songs written by Pete Townshend unless otherwise specified.

1. "Substitute"
2. "I Can't Explain"
3. "Baba O'Riley"
4. "The Punk and the Godfather"
5. "Boris the Spider" (John Entwistle)
6. "Sister Disco"
7. "Behind Blue Eyes"
8. "Music Must Change"
9. "Drowned"
10. "Who Are You"
11. "5:15"
12. "Pinball Wizard"
13. "See Me, Feel Me"
14. "Long Live Rock"
15. "My Generation"
16. "Blue Black White" (dropped after 16 September)
17. "Join Together" (dropped after 14 September)
18. "Magic Bus"
19. "Won't Get Fooled Again"

Encores (variations of the following list):

- "Trick of the Light" (Entwistle)
  - Performed on 10 (not as encore), 11, 13 and 16 September.
- "Young Man Blues" (Mose Allison)
  - Performed on 10 and 14 September.
- "The Real Me"
  - Performed on 10, 14, 17 and 18 September.
- "Summertime Blues" (Eddie Cochran, Jerry Capehart)
  - Performed on 11 and 13 September.
- "Road Runner" (Ellas McDaniel)
  - Performed on 11 and 18 September.
- "All Right Now" (Andy Fraser, Paul Rodgers)
  - Performed on 11 September.
- "Pictures of Lily"
  - Performed on 11 September as an abbreviated version.
- "Big Boss Man" (Al Smith, Luther Dixon)
  - Performed on 11, 13, 16 and 17 September.
- "Cat's in the Cupboard"
  - Performed on 13 and 17 (not as encore) September.
- "Naked Eye"
  - Performed on 13 September.
- "Dance It Away"
  - Performed on 16 (not as encore) and 17 September
- "Shakin' All Over" (Johnny Kidd)
  - Performed on 16, 17 (not as encore) and 18 September.
- "Spoonful" (Willie Dixon)
  - Performed on 16 September.
- "That's Rock And Roll" (unreleased Who song)
  - Performed on 16 September.
- "Sparks"
  - Performed on 17 September.

There were some set list substitutions, variations, and order switches during the tour. "My Wife" was played on 17 September and took the place of "Boris the Spider" on 18 September. Some of the songs in the encore list also made appearances in the regular set, and vice versa. Also, some other songs were played which are not in the above lists:

- "I'm London" (unreleased Who song)
  - Performed on 10 September.
- "You've Got Rock And Roll" (unreleased Who song)
  - Performed on 11 September.
- "The Relay"
  - Performed on 11 and 13 September, both as abbreviated versions.
- "Highway to Hell" (Bon Scott, Angus Young, Malcolm Young)
  - Performed on 13 September, as a snippet intro to "Long Live Rock".
- "Let's See Action"
  - Performed on 14 December
- "My Generation Blues"
  - Performed on 16 September, as an intro to "My Generation".
- "Dreaming from the Waist"
  - Performed on 16 and 18 September.
- "Harmonica Solo"/"Drum Solo"/"Bass Solo"/"Keyboard Solo" (John Entwistle, Roger Daltrey, Kenney Jones, John Bundrick)
  - Performed on 17 September, due to Townshend's leaving the stage due to a cut on his hand.
- "My Wife" (Entwistle)
  - Performed on 17 and 18 (with an interruption due to crowd troubles) September.
- "Please Don't Touch" (Johnny Kidd, Guy Robinson)
  - Performed on 17 September.
- "Sweets for My Sweet" (Doc Pomus, Mort Shuman)
  - Performed on 17 September.
- "Pretty Vacant" (Paul Cook, Steve Jones, John Lydon, Glen Matlock)
  - Performed on 17 September.
- "I Am an Animal"
  - Performed on 17 September.

=== Second UK/US leg ===
This leg featured the second leg of the US tour, as well as its four warm-up shows from 10 to 17 November in Brighton and Stafford, England. The US tour started on 30 November 1979 at the Detroit Masonic Temple in Detroit, Michigan, and ended on 17 December 1979 at the Capital Centre in Landover, Maryland. The concert at the Hammersmith Odeon in London on 28 December for the Concerts for the People of Kampuchea could also be included here. A crowd crush occurred at the Cincinnati concert on 3 December leading to the death of 11 fans and the cancellation of one scheduled concert. This particular set list is taken from a concert in New Haven, Connecticut, on 15 December 1979.

1. "Substitute"
2. "I Can't Explain"
3. "Baba O'Riley"
4. "The Punk and the Godfather"
5. "My Wife" (John Entwistle)
6. "Sister Disco"
7. "Behind Blue Eyes"
8. "Music Must Change"
9. "Drowned"
10. "Who Are You"
11. "5:15"
12. "Pinball Wizard"
13. "See Me, Feel Me"
14. "Long Live Rock"
15. "My Generation"
16. "I Can See for Miles"
17. "Sparks"
18. "Won't Get Fooled Again"

Encores (variations of the following list):

- "Trick of the Light" (Entwistle)
  - Performed on 11 November and 10 December.
- "Big Boss Man" (Al Smith, Luther Dixon)
  - Performed on 11 November; and 8 and 16 December.
- "Young Man Blues" (Mose Allison)
  - Performed on 11 and 30 November; and 4 and 8 December.
- "How Can You Do It Alone"
  - Performed on 11 November; and 4, 6, 7, 8, 10, 13 and 15 December.
- "Shakin' All Over" (Johnny Kidd)
  - Performed on 11 November and 16 December.
- "Dancing in the Street" (Marvin Gaye, William "Mickey" Stevenson, Ivy Jo Hunter)
  - Performed on 11, 16, 17 and 30 November; and 2, 7 (not as encore), 8, 10, 11, 13, 15, 16, 17 and 28 December.
- "Dance It Away"
  - Performed on 16 and 30 November; and 2, 4 (not as encore), 8, 10, 11, 13, 15, 16, 17 and 28 December.
- "The Real Me"
  - Performed on 16 and 30 November; and 3, 6, 8, 10, 11, 13, 15 and 28 December.
- "Magic Bus"
  - Performed on 2, 7 and 17 December.
- "Summertime Blues" (Eddie Cochran, Jerry Capehart)
  - Performed on 3, 4, 6, 7, 10, 11, 13, 15 and 28 December.
- "Hoochie Coochie Man" (Willie Dixon)
  - Performed on 8 and 28 (not as encore) December.
- "I'm a Man" (Ellas McDaniel)
  - Performed on 8 and 28 (not as encore) December.
- "Road Runner" (McDaniel)
  - Performed on 8 December.
- "Take a Fool Like You"
  - Performed on 10 December.
- "Baby Don't You Do It" (Holland-Dozier-Holland)
  - Performed on 16 December.

There were some set list substitutions, variations, and order switches during the tour. "Boris the Spider" was played in the first half of this leg, being dropped after 7 December. Some of the songs in the encore list also made appearances in the regular set, and vice versa. Also, some other songs were played which are not in the above lists:

- "Boris the Spider" (Entwistle)
  - Performed on 10, 11, 16 and 30 November; and 2, 4, 6 and 7 December.
- "Dreaming from the Waist"
  - Performed on 11 November.
- "I'm London"
  - Performed on 2 December.
- "I Sent You a Letter"
  - Performed on 2 December.
- "Slip Kid"
  - Performed on 4 December as a snippet.
- "The Relay"
  - Performed on 8 December as a snippet.
- "Mystery Train" (Junior Parker, Sam Phillips)
  - Performed during "5:15" on 28 December. Short tease only.
- "I Am the Sea"
  - Performed (loosely) on 28 December before the intro of "Pinball Wizard".
- "I Don't Want To Be an Old Man" (a.k.a. "Fuck All Blues")
  - Performed on 28 December.

== Tour dates ==
=== European leg (2 May – 1 September) ===
List of tour dates with date, city, country, venue, references
| Date (1979) | City | Country | Venue | Ref(s) |
|---|---|---|---|---|
| 2 May | London | England | Rainbow Theatre | |
| 12 May | Fréjus | France | Arènes de Fréjus | |
| 13 May | Fréjus | France | Arènes de Fréjus | |
| 16 May | Paris | France | Pavillon de Paris | |
| 17 May | Paris | France | Pavillon de Paris | |
| 8 June | Glasgow | Scotland | The Apollo | |
| 9 June | Edinburgh | Scotland | Edinburgh Odeon | |
| 18 August | London | England | Wembley Stadium | |
| 1 September | Nuremberg | West Germany | Zeppelinfeld | |

=== U.S. leg (10–18 September) ===
List of tour dates with date, city, country, venue, references
| Date (1979) | City | Country | Venue | Ref(s) |
|---|---|---|---|---|
| 10 September | Passaic | United States | Capitol Theatre | |
| 11 September | Passaic | United States | Capitol Theatre | |
| 13 September | New York City | United States | Madison Square Garden | |
| 14 September | New York City | United States | Madison Square Garden | |
| 16 September | New York City | United States | Madison Square Garden | |
| 17 September | New York City | United States | Madison Square Garden | |
| 18 September | New York City | United States | Madison Square Garden | |

=== U.K. leg (10–17 November) ===
List of tour dates with date, city, country, venue, references
| Date (1979) | City | Country | Venue | Ref(s) |
|---|---|---|---|---|
| 10 November | Brighton | England | Brighton Centre | |
| 11 November | Brighton | England | Brighton Centre | |
| 16 November | Stafford | England | Bingley Hall | |
| 17 November | Stafford | England | Bingley Hall | |

=== U.S. leg (30 November – 17 December) ===
List of tour dates with date, city, country, venue, references
| Date (1979) | City | Country | Venue | Ref(s) |
|---|---|---|---|---|
| 30 November | Detroit | United States | Detroit Masonic Temple | |
| 2 December | Pittsburgh | United States | Civic Arena | |
| 3 December | Cincinnati | United States | Riverfront Coliseum | |
| 4 December | Buffalo | United States | Buffalo Memorial Auditorium | |
| 6 December | Cleveland | United States | Richfield Coliseum | |
| 7 December | Pontiac | United States | Pontiac Silverdome | |
| 8 December | Chicago | United States | International Amphitheatre | |
| 10 December | Philadelphia | United States | Spectrum | |
| 11 December | Philadelphia | United States | Spectrum | |
| 13 December | Landover | United States | Capital Centre | |
| 15 December | New Haven | United States | New Haven Coliseum | |
| 16 December | Boston | United States | Boston Garden | |
| 17 December | Landover | United States | Capital Centre | |

=== U.K. show (28 December) ===
List of tour dates with date, city, country, venue, references
| Date (1979) | City | Country | Venue | Ref(s) |
|---|---|---|---|---|
| 28 December (Note: The concert on 28 December was a part of the Concerts for the People of Kampuchea.) | London | England | Hammersmith Odeon | |

== See also ==
- List of The Who tours and performances
