= Trick of the Light (The Who song) =

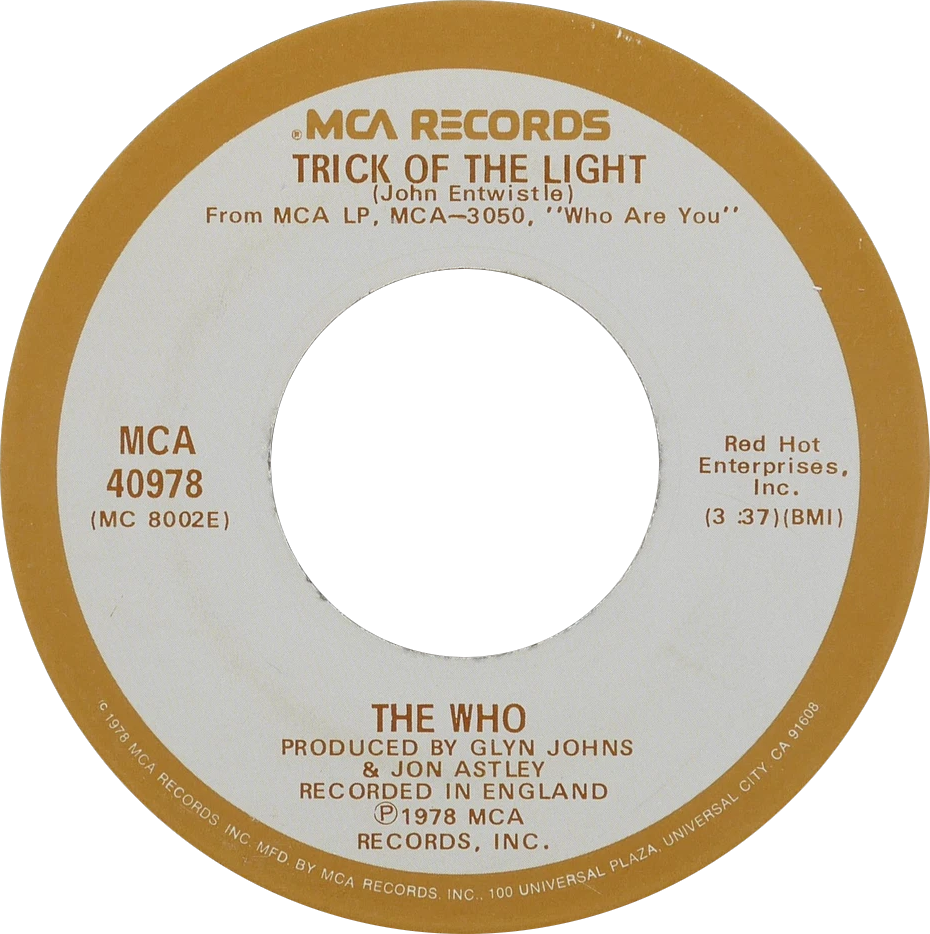
- Side-A of the US single

Single by the Who

from the album Who Are You
- B-side: "905"
- Released: 2 December 1978 (US)
- Recorded: 30 September 1977
- Genre: Hard rock; heavy metal
- Length: 4:06 (original mix); 4:45 (1996 remix); 3:37 (single edit)
- Label: MCA
- Songwriter: John Entwistle
- Producers: Glyn Johns; Jon Astley

The Who singles chronology
"Who Are You" (1978)	"Trick of the Light" (1978)	"Long Live Rock" (1979)

Who Are You track listing
- 9 tracks Side one: 1. "New Song"; 2. "Had Enough"; 3. "905"; 4. "Sister Disco"; 5. "Music Must Change"; Side two: 6. "Trick of the Light"; 7. "Guitar and Pen"; 8. "Love Is Coming Down"; 9. "Who Are You"

"Trick of the Light" is a song written by bassist John Entwistle for the English rock band the Who's eighth studio album, Who Are You (1978). It was released as the second single from the album, atypically with another Entwistle song, "905" on the B-side, but did not chart.

The lyrics describe fear of being sexually inadequate in the face of a prostitute. The singer wants to have an emotional connection with the prostitute but she only sees him as dehumanized and recognizes his sexual insecurity. He is concerned that he didn't bring her "to the height of ecstasy". It features a guitar-like assault throughout the song, described by Pete Townshend as sounding like "a musical Mack truck" and is actually Entwistle's heavily distorted eight-string Alembic bass guitar. Chris Charlesworth feels that the bass dominates the song to an extent that none of the other elements of the song matter. Billboard described the guitar riff as "furious" and "unrelenting", and also praises drummer Keith Moon's ability to "[sustain] rhythmic tension". Cashbox said that the song is "driven by powerful guitar work by Pete Townshend and aggressive drumming from Keith Moon". Record World said that the song "features the group's familiar song structure carried by wall-of-sound instrumentation".

Who biographer John Atkins says the song has a "muscular texture" and is "fully realized" but that it represents an "orthodox heavy rock format" that the band usually shunned. The Who FAQ author Mike Segretto considers it one of Entwistle's "catchier songs", attributing its lack of chart success to its being "too heavy" and "too mean" for the 1977 singles chart. Segretto considers the song to be underrated, finding humor in the situation but stating that "genuine vulnerability makes the song more than a good giggle and undercuts the performance's cock-rock attitude." But it was not a favorite of Who lead vocalist Roger Daltrey, who complained that it went "on and on and on and on".

It was performed occasionally on the Who's 1979 tour, with Entwistle on eight-string bass and Townshend playing one of the Alembic basses Entwistle used on the 1975–1976 tours. It made its return to the setlist in 1989, with Townshend on electric guitar for the two Toronto dates in June, and on acoustic guitar for the rest of the tour.
