= New Song (The Who song) =

Song by the Who

from the album Who Are You
- Released: 18 August 1978
- Recorded: October 1977 – April 1978
- Genre: Rock
- Length: 4:12
- Label: Polydor (UK); MCA (US)
- Songwriter: Pete Townshend
- Producers: Glyn Johns; Jon Astley

Who Are You track listing
- 9 tracks Side one: 1. "New Song"; 2. "Had Enough"; 3. "905"; 4. "Sister Disco"; 5. "Music Must Change"; Side two: 6. "Trick of the Light"; 7. "Guitar and Pen"; 8. "Love Is Coming Down"; 9. "Who Are You"

"New Song" is the opening track on the Who's eighth studio album Who Are You (1978). It was written by Pete Townshend.

== Lyrics ==
The lyrics of "New Song" are about FM radio's demand for bands to clone their previous hits. Pete Townshend, the author of the song, once said, "This is a diatribe against the requirements of FM radio (at the time) for every band of the day to produce 'clones' of their earlier successful airplay hits. This was my signal to everyone that I had decided to deal a wonky deck full of theatrical parodies and anachronisms. Needless to say, the song didn't get airplay and neither did it make the critics happy. Great sounding cut, such a pity it is full of such cynical sentiment."

== Music ==
Like many of Who Are You's songs, "New Song" features a slick production sound, as well as the use of synthesizers. "'New Song' was the first song I ever wrote on a polyphonic synthesizer," Townshend said. "It was blocked out on an ARP OMNI, that company's first polyphonic machine. It may have been the first multi-voice synth ever. But I cheated quite a lot; it had only one filter and envelope-shaping amplifier."

== Release and critical reception ==
"New Song" was first released on the Who Are You album. It was not released as a single.

AllMusic critic Richie Unterberger called the song one of Who Are You's "blustery attempts at contemporary relevance", despite noting the track as a highlight from said album. Greil Marcus of Rolling Stone said, "'New Song,' the first cut, rams home the guilt of having taken a free ride: 'I write the same old song, with a few new lines/And everybody wants to cheer me.'"
