= In Concert (WKRP in Cincinnati) =

- WKRP in Cincinnati episode
- Episode no.: Season 2 Episode 19
- Directed by: Linda Day
- Written by: Steven Kampmann
- Original air date: February 11, 1980

Episode chronology
← Previous "Les's Groupie"	Next → "The Doctor's Daughter"

"In Concert" is a very special episode of the television series WKRP in Cincinnati. Airing as the 19th episode of the second season, it was first broadcast in the United States on February 11, 1980 on CBS, and the concept for the episode was described as "admirably ambitious" by William Beamon, writing in the St. Petersburg Evening Independent before he had viewed the episode.

The plot is centered around the deadly gate-rushing incident that occurred in Cincinnati prior to the December 3, 1979, performance by the Who at Riverfront Coliseum, eleven weeks before the episode aired.

== Plot ==
The radio station promotes a concert by the Who, and employees prepare to attend the concert. Station employees are overcome with guilt after a push for seats by attending fans results in some fans being crushed to death. The next day, they discuss the tragic events, the fallibility of festival seating, and the sorrow felt by both the staff and the people of Cincinnati.

== Background ==
The December 3, 1979, concert at the Riverfront Coliseum in Cincinnati was the 14th stop during the Who's 1979 world tour. Of the 18,348 tickets sold for the concert, 14,770 were for unassigned seats known as festival seating, obtained on a first-come, first-served basis. City officials had objected to the use of festival seating at the facility as early as October 1976.

Attendees arrived as much as six hours before the start of the concert to attempt to garner the best available seats, and a crowd had gathered by 3:00 p.m. ET. An hour before the start of the concert, "thousands were tightly packed around the entrance doors", and by 7:20 p.m. ET the crowd consisted of 8,000 people. Some members of the crowd rushed the gates on the plaza level on the west side of the Coliseum, crushing those at the front. The incident resulted in the death of 11 individuals by compressive asphyxia and injuries to 23. In a press conference after the concert, police lieutenant Dale Menkhaus stated that too few gate doors had been opened, and witnesses stated only one door had been opened at the main gate. Menkahus stated that the doors had been purposely kept closed because the Who had arrived late for a soundcheck. An emergency room supervisor stated that the victims had sustained "multiple contusions and hemorrhages".

The facility and its executives had received lawful orders from the city's fire chief as early as 1976 concerning event actions, such as "locking and barring of exit doors during performances, overcrowded conditions and the blocking of aisles". Executives were later charged for failure to comply with those lawful orders.

Security for a concert by the Who in Buffalo, New York, the next night was doubled, and the band dedicated it to the victims. Two concerts scheduled at Riverfront Coliseum were postponed: that by Blue Öyster Cult on December 14, and that by Aerosmith on December 21.

On December 27, 1979, the Cincinnati municipal council enacted bylaws banning festival seating as a result of this event. The council and the Government of Ohio also passed laws involving crowd control. The cities of Indianapolis and Louisville prepared ordinances to ban festival seating.

== Conception and development ==
Hugh Wilson, the show's producer, said he initially rejected the idea for the episode, but later accepted when writers told him that the incident happened in Cincinnati, in which the show is based, and involved rock and roll, the show's primary subject. The episode would focus on the fact that few cities in the United States addressed the issue of festival and unreserved seating after the incident.

Richard Sanders stated that the cast had a "hard time to get up for some of the comic parts of the show" because of the subject of the episode. He stated that the "whole cast had read the articles, everything we could get hold of, about the incident" and that it was a "hard week to get through". In an interview with WEBN, Sanders stated that the cast "had an objective in mind" so that "other cities will become conscious of the dangers" of festival seating.

The production team had requested from WCPO-TV (the CBS affiliate station in Cincinnati from 1961 to 1996) footage of a candlelight memorial service for the victims held at the Coliseum. The station's vice president Robert Gordon rejected the request stating "this incident is so sensitive that we don't wish to participate without greater control or knowledge of the end product".

Gordon had stated that the station would not broadcast the episode. After he and other network officials previewed it, they "found it in good taste and allowed it to be aired".

Before being broadcast, CBS vice president of operations Donn O'Brien told Wilson that the episode would not include the ending with a printed crawl message listing all cities in the United States to enact bylaws or pass an ordinance banning festival and unreserved seating. Cincinnati was the only city listed.
