= Had Enough (The Who song) =

Song by The Who

Single by the Who

from the album Who Are You
- A-side: "Who Are You"
- Released: 1978
- Recorded: 30 September 1977
- Genre: Symphonic rock
- Length: 4:27
- Label: Polydor (UK); MCA (US)
- Songwriter: John Entwistle
- Producers: Glyn Johns; Jon Astley

The Who singles chronology
"Squeeze Box" (1975)	"Who Are You" / "Had Enough" (1978)	"You Better You Bet" (1981)

Official audio
- "Had Enough" on YouTube

"Had Enough" is a song written by the Who's bassist John Entwistle, and featured on their eighth studio album, Who Are You (1978). It was also released as a double A-side single with "Who Are You", making it Entwistle's second single A-side, after "Postcard" from Odds & Sods in 1974.

== Background ==
Like "905", "Had Enough" was planned to feature on a rock opera in the process of being written by John Entwistle, but was never finished. It was written a long time before work was started on the Who's album Who Are You. The lyrics describe the main character of the failed rock opera, 905, finally snapping under the pressure and stress of his life.

"Had Enough" saw single release as a double-A side single with "Who Are You" in 1978 prior to the Who Are You album's release. Despite this, "Had Enough" received far less radio airplay than "Who Are You" but American FM rock radio played the song frequently after its release. Entwistle later joked that most people probably thought the song was a B-side because it said "Entwistle" on it. It was never performed live by the Who, although it featured in many of Entwistle's solo concerts.

== Composition ==
"Had Enough" was the third John Entwistle composition that had Roger Daltrey on lead vocals, after "Someone's Coming" from 1967, and "Success Story" from 1975. Entwistle said of the song's composition:

I used an old Who trick, which is playing that sort of dum dum dum dum beat like "Bell Boy." I put that kind of beat to it and I used a suspended chord where you play just a C bass note and stay on the C and write chords around it that fit in. And presto! Instant Who song!

Unusually for a Who song, it features a full string orchestra, which was arranged by Ted Astley. Pete Townshend said of these strings:

We used full orchestral string arrangements here for the first time on any Who track. It seemed OK to do it with one of John's songs -- he was always struggling single-handed to lay down enough overdubbed brass parts on my stuff (especially Quadrophenia) to sound like an orchestra himself. Our arranger was my wife's inspired father, Ted Astley. The strings on this track are quantum. But it's another cynical, life-weary lyric, like 'New Song'. I wonder why John and I were so bored with life?

Roger Daltrey, however, did not approve of these strings, reportedly head-butting producer Glyn Johns over the disagreement. He later said:

I had a punch-up with Glyn Johns, mainly because he put strings on John's track 'Had Enough.' I went into the studio in the afternoon the day before they put on the strings. I thought, 'Fucking hell, strings on a Who track?' When I heard it, it was just slushy strings and I don't like slushy strings. I don't mind orchestras. I like them triumphant. There's things you can do with strings that can be really good and exciting but what he'd done on this I didn't like. He said, 'What do you think?' And I said, 'Don't like it much.' And he went up the fucking wall. So I think he smacked me and I smacked him and that's how we were in those days.

== Critical reception ==
Cashbox said it has "a strong guitar and keyboard presence, stout drumming and aggressive stance by Roger Daltrey" as well as "silky backing singing".
