= The Who concert disaster =

1979 crowd disaster in Cincinnati, Ohio, US

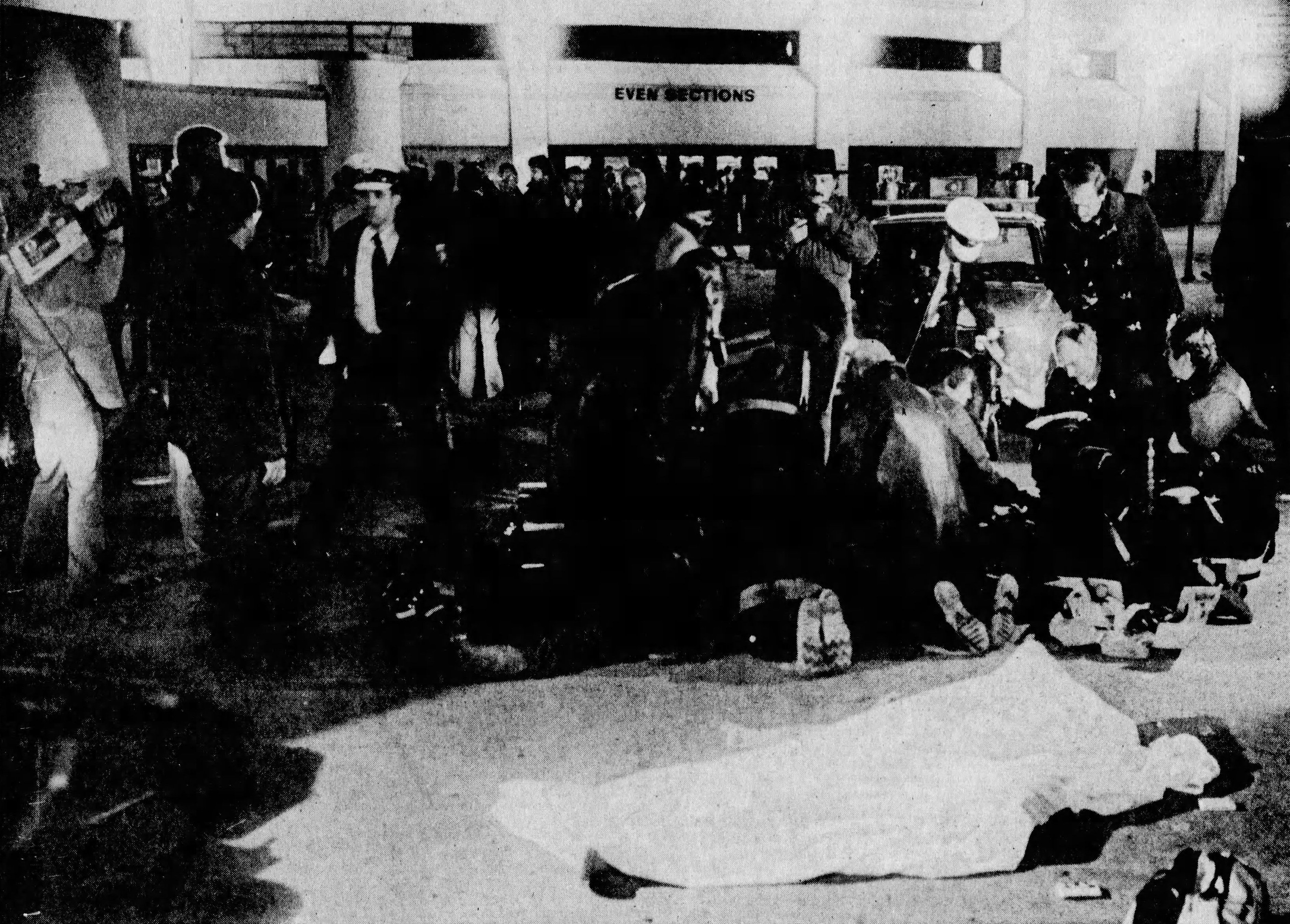
- A victim is covered with a sheet as emergency workers attempt to revive others.
- Date: December 3, 1979
- Location: Riverfront Coliseum, Cincinnati, Ohio, U.S.; 39°5′51″N 84°30′18″W
- Deaths: 11
- Injuries: 26

The Who concert disaster was a crowd disaster that occurred on December 3, 1979, when the English rock band the Who performed at Riverfront Coliseum (now known as Heritage Bank Center) in Cincinnati, Ohio, United States. Amidst confusion about the concert's start time, not all entry doors to the coliseum opened; a rush of concert-goers into the few open doors resulted in the deaths of 11 people.

== Background ==
The Who were in the midst of the United States leg of their 1979 world tour, which began in September with a total of seven dates split between the Capitol Theatre in Passaic, New Jersey and Madison Square Garden in New York City. The tour was their first following the 1978 death of drummer Keith Moon and featured former Small Faces drummer Kenney Jones as Moon's official replacement. The band then took some time off, and resumed the tour on November 30 at the auditorium of the Detroit Masonic Temple. The Cincinnati concert was the third show played in this portion of the tour, after a concert the night before at the Pittsburgh Civic Arena.

The concert sold out—18,348 tickets in total.

== Summary of events ==
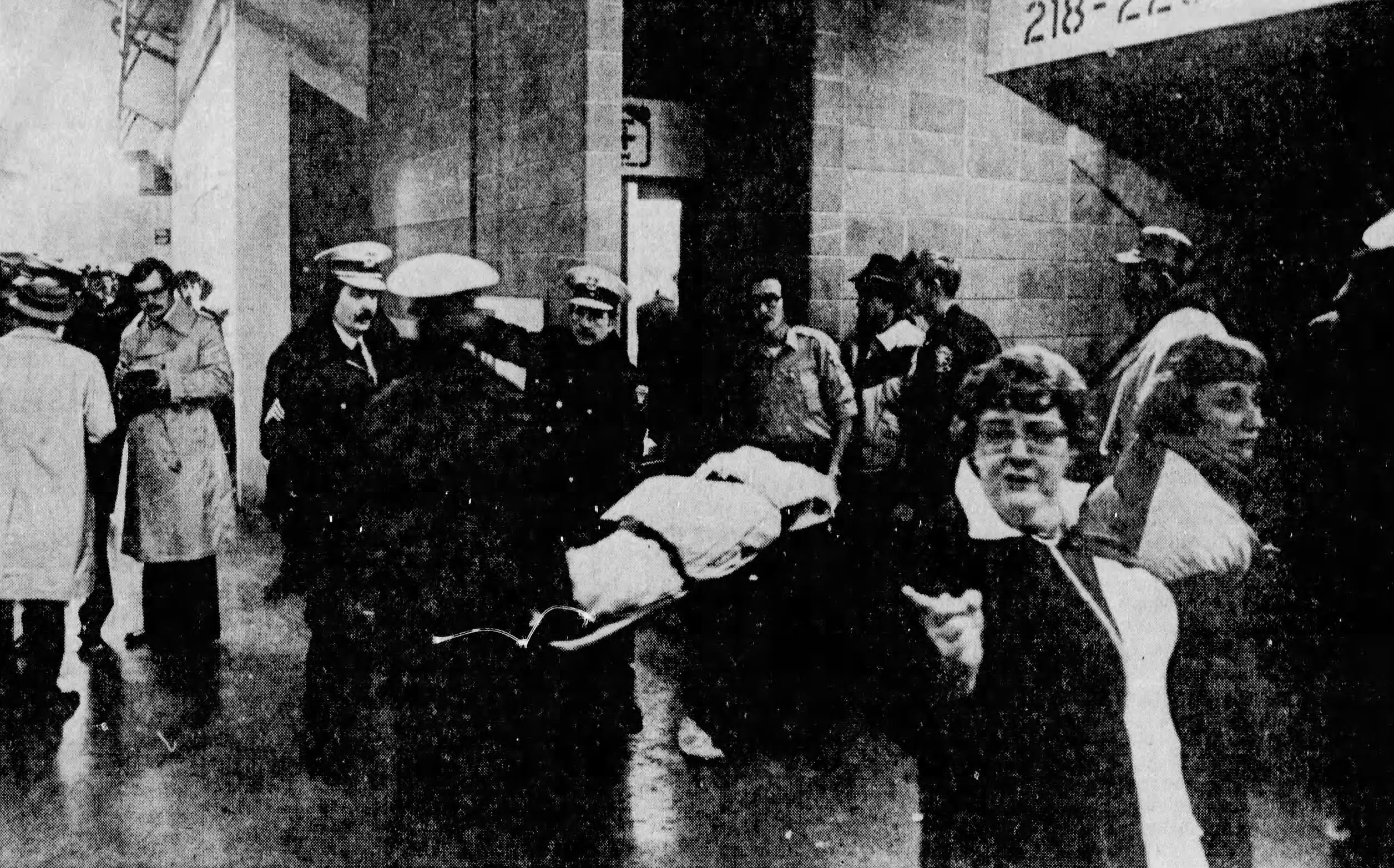
A body is carried out of a Riverfront Coliseum lobby.

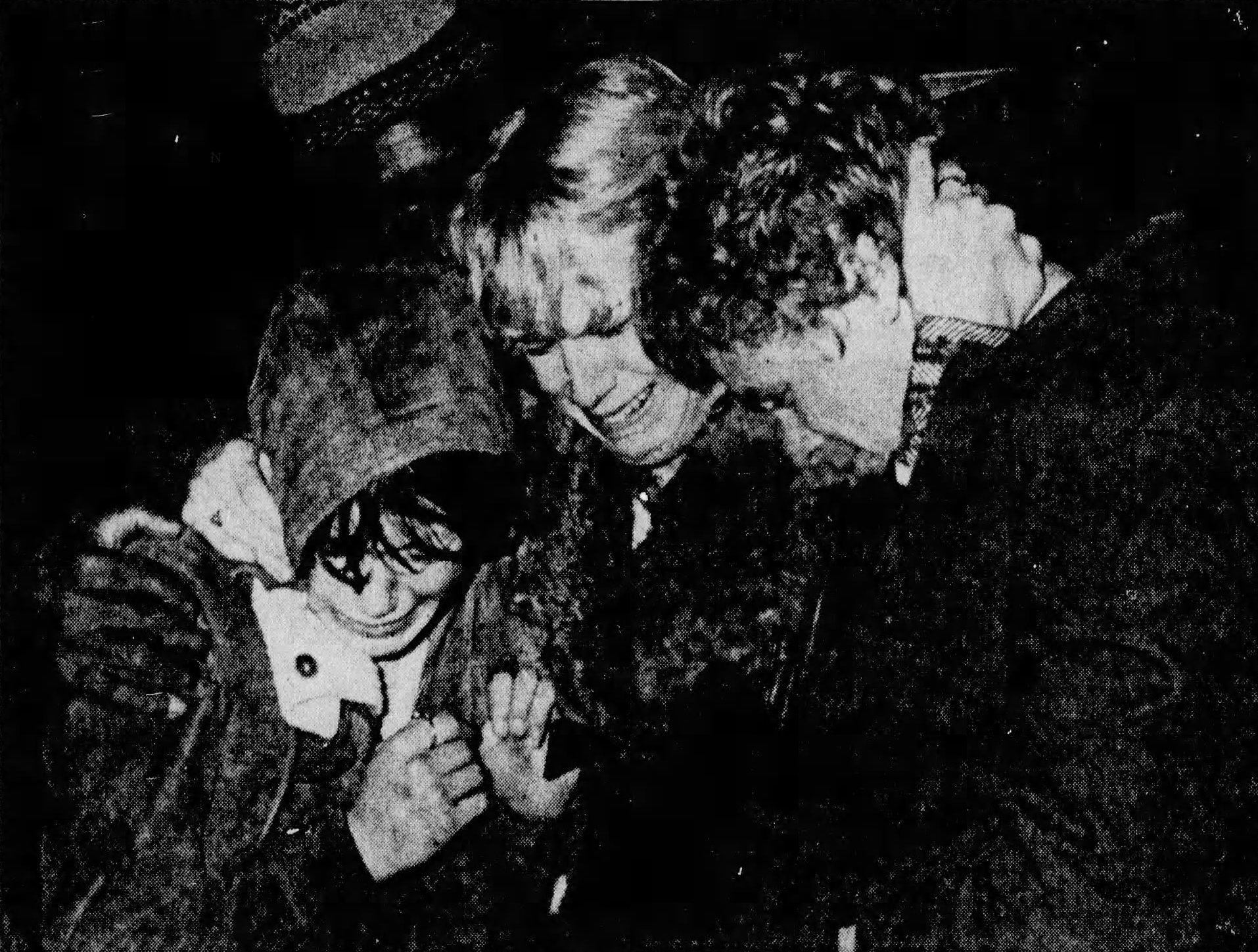
Young concertgoers weep in the aftermath.

People were originally told through a radio station that General Admission ticket holders would be admitted at 3:00 p.m. and therefore a sizable crowd formed by 5:00 p.m. Although all the doors were expected to be opened simultaneously, only two doors at the far right of the main entrance were finally opened. As concertgoers entered the arena through these two open doors, those waiting in front of all of the other doors began pushing forward again.

After a short period of waiting and then knocking on the doors and the glass next to the doors, the crowd assumed that none of the remaining doors would be opened. At about 7:15 p.m., the situation began to escalate. Conflicting reports suggested that concertgoers could hear either a very late soundcheck or the Who's film Quadrophenia (1979), instead of an opening act. Either way, the crowd assumed that the Who were on earlier than scheduled.

At that point, the entire crowd surged and pushed toward the two doors that had been opened. This caused many people to get trampled, while some suffered more serious injuries. Eleven people were unable to escape the dense crowd pushing toward them and died by asphyxiation. Twenty-six other people reported injuries.

Fire officials advised Who manager Bill Curbishley to cancel the concert, but he convinced them to allow the show to continue to avoid further panic. The concert went as planned, with the band members not being told of the tragedy until after their performance. Years later, Who guitarist Pete Townshend recalled his feelings after the show; "I went through two phases. One was, of course, tremendous upset and concern. But the other was incredible anger that we had been performing while this was going on."

The following night, a lengthy segment on the tragedy aired on the CBS Evening News with Walter Cronkite examining violence at rock concerts. At the Who's next concert in Buffalo on December 4, lead vocalist Roger Daltrey told the crowd: "We lost a lot of family last night. This show's for them." Years later, Townshend said he regretted leaving Cincinnati and continuing to tour, remarking on the Buffalo concert "We're in the wrong city. We're in Buffalo."

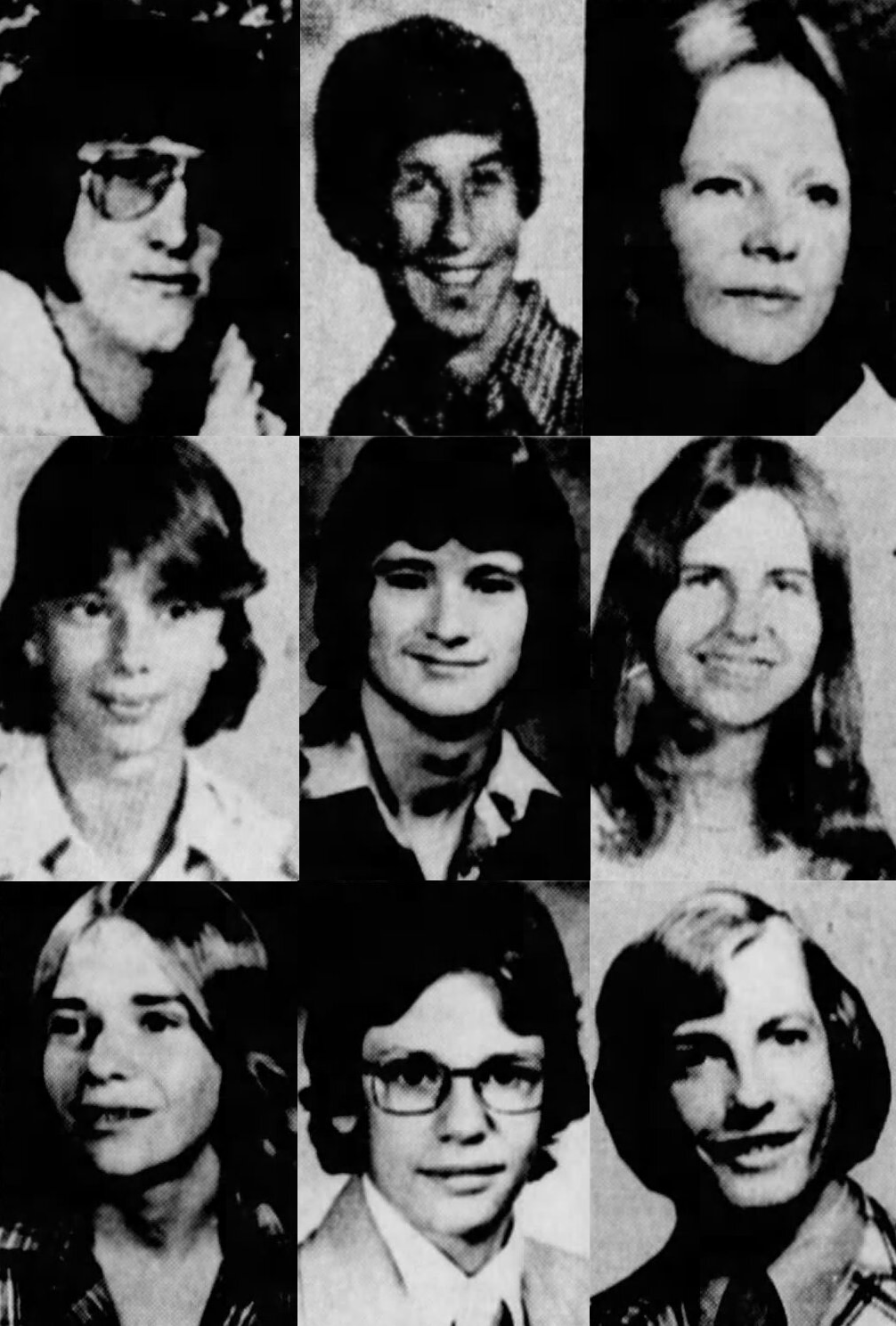
Victims from top left: Adams, Bowes, Burns, Eckerle, Heck, Morrison, Preston, Wagner, Warmoth (not pictured: Ladd, Snyder)

The eleven people who died in the crush were:

- Walter Adams Jr., aged 22, Trotwood, Ohio
- Peter Bowes, aged 18, Wyoming, Ohio
- Connie Sue Burns, aged 21, Miamisburg, Ohio
- Jacqueline Eckerle, aged 15, Finneytown, Ohio
- David Heck, aged 19, Highland Heights, Kentucky
- Teva Rae Inlow Ladd, aged 27, Newtown, Ohio
- Karen Morrison, aged 15, Finneytown, Ohio
- Stephan Preston, aged 19, Finneytown, Ohio
- Philip Snyder, aged 20, Franklin, Ohio
- Bryan Wagner, aged 17, Fort Thomas, Kentucky
- James Theodore Warmoth, aged 21, Franklin, Ohio

== Aftermath ==
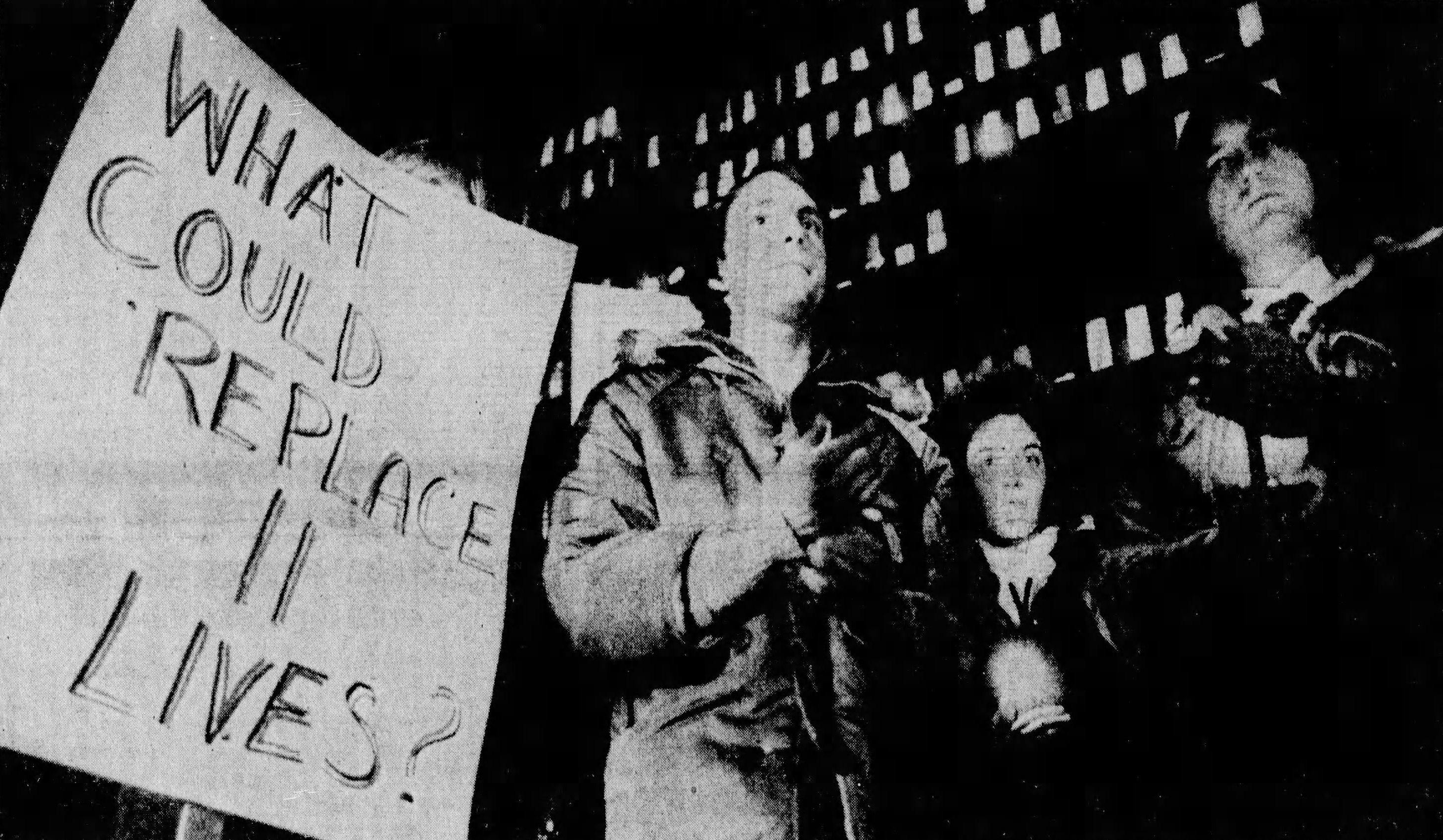
Protesters carried candles from the Coliseum to Fountain Square the day after the concert.

In Providence, Rhode Island, Mayor Buddy Cianci cancelled a scheduled performance of the Who at the city's Civic Center that same month. This was even though the Providence venue had assigned seating. In 2012, the band returned to Providence and honored tickets from the 1979 show.

The victims' families sued the band, concert promoter Electric Factory Concerts, and the city of Cincinnati. The class action suit filed on behalf of ten of the families was settled in 1983, awarding each of the families of the deceased approximately $150,000 ($484,900 today). The family of Peter Bowes opted out of the class action and settled later for an undisclosed amount. Approximately $750,000 ($2,424,400 today) was to be divided among the 26 injured. The city of Cincinnati also imposed a ban on unassigned festival seating on December 27, 1979, with minor exceptions, for the next 25 years.

The incident was the subject of a book, Are the Kids All Right? The Rock Generation and Its Hidden Death Wish, as well as a second-season episode of WKRP in Cincinnati called "In Concert". It also inspired scenes in the film Pink Floyd – The Wall, whose 1982 premiere was attended by the Who's Pete Townshend.

In 2004, Cincinnati permanently repealed its long-standing ban on unassigned seating, two years after temporarily making an exception for a Bruce Springsteen concert. The goal of lifting the ban was to attract more big-name acts. However, the city now mandates nine square feet per person at a venue, and the number of tickets sold for each event is adjusted accordingly.

Paul Wertheimer, the city's first Public Information Officer at the time of the tragedy, went on to serve on a task force on crowd control, and later founded Crowd Management Strategies in 1992, a consulting firm based in Los Angeles.

In 2009, 30 years after the tragedy, rock station WEBN/102.7 aired a retrospective, including clips from news coverage in 1979.

The P.E.M. Memorial was created in August 2010 to commemorate the lives of those who died while awaiting entry to the concert. Every first Saturday in December, local musicians perform at the P.E.M. Memorial. The free concert features old and new tunes to raise awareness of the P.E.M. Scholarship Fund. Of the 11 people who died that day, three were from Finneytown High School – Stephan Preston, Jackie Eckerle, and Karen Morrison. Three scholarships are awarded annually to eligible Finneytown High School seniors who are pursuing higher education in the arts or music at an accredited university or college. In 2018, Roger Daltrey visited the Finneytown High School and met with a group of family members of victims and survivors. Daltrey and the families later said the meeting brought a great deal of peace and healing.

In 2014, Pearl Jam played in the city and acknowledged the tragedy. They dedicated a cover version of the Who's "The Real Me" to those who died. Pearl Jam had experienced a similar tragedy in 2000, when nine people died in a crush during their concert at Roskilde Festival.

On the eve of the 35th anniversary of the tragedy, Cincinnati Mayor John Cranley promised to have a historical marker on the site of the tragedy in 2015. A committee consisting of three concert survivors (Mike Babb, Thomas Brown, Rick Schwitzer) and one family member of victim Teva Ladd (Kasey Ladd) was pivotal in getting the memorial placed. The marker was dedicated at U. S. Bank Arena (as it was then known) on December 3, 2015.

The Showtime series Roadies dedicated an entire episode to the 1979 event. The episode, "The City Whose Name Must Not Be Spoken", showcases the "roadies" of a fictional band completing many rituals after someone on the tour bus mentions Cincinnati.

== The Who's return to Cincinnati ==
On the 40th anniversary of the tragedy in December 2019, Cincinnati television station WCPO aired the documentary The Who: The Night That Changed Rock about the incident and its aftermath, which featured interviews from survivors, family members, Daltrey, and Townshend. The documentary and a separate WCPO news broadcast marked the first time that Daltrey and Townshend had ever conducted interviews solely about the Cincinnati disaster.

In 2019, the Who announced plans for a Cincinnati-area performance in April 2020, to be held at the BB&T Arena (known since April 2022 as Truist Arena) at Northern Kentucky University, although the concert was postponed because of the COVID-19 pandemic. Pete Townshend said in a documentary aired on the tragedy's anniversary, "We need to go back to Cincinnati, you know, we do. As soon as we can. It would be such a joyous occasion for us, and such a healing thing." Townshend also said that he regretted that the band did not stay around to mourn with others at the venue on the night of the tragedy, saying "I'm not forgiving us. We should have stayed."

After 43 years, the Who returned to perform in Cincinnati on May 15, 2022, as a part of their North American "The Who Hits Back" tour, with the event moved from Truist Arena to TQL Stadium. It was the first time the band had played in Cincinnati since the incident in 1979. Students from Finneytown High School were booked to play and sing alongside the band for a portion of the concert. The concert's opening act was Safe Passage, a local band featuring members of the Finneytown High School Class of 1979, and two of its members had attended the Riverfront Coliseum concert. The families of nine of the victims of the disaster were in attendance. Prior to the band taking the stage, a video message from Pearl Jam vocalist Eddie Vedder was broadcast in which he recalled how Daltrey and Townshend had comforted him after a fatal crowd crush occurred during his band's 2000 set at the Roskilde Festival in Denmark.

During their performance, the Who incorporated tributes to Cincinnati and the victims at the 1979 concert. The names and photos of the 11 victims were displayed throughout the concert. Photographs of the 11 victims of the 1979 disaster appeared on the venue's video screens as Who keyboardist Loren Gold performed an 11-minute instrumental introduction to "Love, Reign o'er Me". The band was accompanied by 10 current Finneytown High students during the concert-ending performance of "Baba O'Riley".

== See also ==
- Crowd collapses and crushes
- List of fatal crowd crushes
