= Who Are You =

1978 studio album by the Who

Studio album by the Who
- Released: 18 August 1978
- Recorded: September 1977 – April 1978
- Studios: Ramport, London; Olympic, London; RAK, London; St John's Wood; Pete Townshend's own studio in Goring-on-Thames
- Genre: Hard rock
- Length: 42:13
- Labels: Polydor (UK); MCA (US)
- Producers: Glyn Johns; Jon Astley

The Who chronology
| The Story of The Who (1976) | Who Are You (1978) | The Kids Are Alright (1979) |

Singles from Who Are You
- 1. "Who Are You" / "Had Enough" Released: 14 July 1978; 2. "Trick of the Light" / "905" Released: December 1978

Who Are You is the eighth studio album by the English rock band the Who, released on 18 August 1978 by Polydor Records in the United Kingdom and on 21 August 1978 by MCA Records in the United States. Although the album received mixed reviews from critics, it was a commercial success, peaking at number 2 on the US Billboard 200 chart and number 6 on the UK Albums Chart.

Who Are You was the Who's final studio album to feature Keith Moon as their drummer. He died three weeks after it was released. The uncannily coincidental nature of the text "Not to Be Taken Away" that was stenciled on Moon's chair on the album cover was noted by some critics.

== Overview ==
Who Are You incorporates elements of progressive rock and, according to biographer Tony Fletcher, it was produced in such a way as to appeal to commercial rock radio at the time.

The album showcased some of Pete Townshend's most complicated arrangements, with multiple layers of synthesizer and strings. Many of the songs also revisited themes from Townshend's never-realized Lifehouse project, featuring lyrics about songwriting and music as a metaphor for life, as indicated by titles like "Guitar and Pen", "New Song", "Music Must Change", and "Sister Disco". The latter two, along with "Who Are You", ultimately appeared on the 2000 box set Lifehouse Chronicles, Townshend's later actualization of the project. Several of the song's lyrics also reflect Townshend's uncertainty about the Who's continued relevance in the wake of punk rock, and his dissatisfaction with the music industry.

There was a three-year hiatus between Who Are You and the Who's previous studio album, The Who by Numbers (1975). The band was drifting apart during this period, for band members were working on various solo projects, and Moon and Townshend were driving deeper into drug and alcohol abuse. The initial sessions at Ramport Studios, produced by Glyn Johns and Jon Astley (who was Townsend's brother-in-law at the time,) were lackadaisical; Jon Astley recalled that "no one wanted to work", and the members looked forward more to drinking and reminiscing at six in the evening. Astley felt that he and Johns pushed Moon too hard to play a simpler style, while Johns believed that Moon had "lost confidence in his ability" and would deliberately go out of his way to resist his suggestions.

Moon's health was especially an object of concern, for his drumming skills had noticeably deteriorated and his performances for most of the sessions were substandard. He was unable to play in 6/8 time on the track "Music Must Change", so the drums were removed completely from the track, and replaced with the sound of footsteps and a few cymbal crashes. Bassist John Entwistle remarked that Moon "couldn't think of anything to play". Townshend writes in his memoir Who I Am that he offered to remove "Music Must Change" from the album due to Moon's struggles, and that Moon retorted, "I am still the best... Keith Moon-type drummer in the world!".

On another occasion, Astley recalled, "I was doing a drum track, and he hadn't learned the song. I actually had to stand up and conduct. He said, 'Can you give me a cue when you get to the middle part?' [...] He hadn't done his homework." Entwistle similarly described Moon as "really out of condition", and "disgusted with himself" as a result. Townshend wrote, "Musically his drumming was getting so uneven that recording was almost impossible, so much so that work on the Who Are You album had ground to a halt."

The recording was further delayed when lead singer Roger Daltrey underwent throat surgery, and when during a lengthy Christmas break, Townshend sliced his hand in a window during an argument with his parents. Former Zombies and Argent member Rod Argent was also called in to replace session keyboardist John "Rabbit" Bundrick after Bundrick suffered a broken arm falling out of a taxi at the studio door in March 1978. Townshend attributed Bundrick's broken arm to drunkenly throwing himself out to avoid paying the fare.

When the sessions resumed in March, they were moved to RAK Studios, which caused further delays due to the equipment malfunctioning, including the wiping of a backing track. Astley stated that the RAK equipment made the existing material sound different when played back, necessitating further delays as he attempted to fix the audio problems. In one incident, Daltrey punched Johns in the face due to an argument over a rough mix, rendering him unconscious. The argument was fuelled by Ted Astley adding a string arrangement to "Had Enough", which Daltrey derided as "slushy". (“Had Enough” and “905” were originally part of a rock opera that Entwistle never completed.) After one long and frustrating day, Townshend planned to fire Moon from the band unless he cleaned up his act. The plan drove Moon to attempt to kick his alcohol habit and work more enthusiastically. Due to a prior commitment to produce Joan Armatrading's studio album To the Limit, Johns had to leave in April, with Astley remaining as sole producer. Under Astley's command, the sessions returned to Ramport, with all of the drums except for "Who Are You" recorded in the last two weeks of production. Who Are You was released on 18 August 1978.

Moon died on 7 September 1978, just under a month after the album's release; on the cover, he is shown sitting in a chair labelled "Not to be taken away". Photographer Terry O'Neil had insisted Moon sit with the back of the chair facing the camera so as to hide his distended stomach, a result of his alcoholism.

== Reception ==
Professional ratings
Review scores
| Source | Rating |
|---|---|
| AllMusic | 3.5/5 stars |
| Christgau's Record Guide | B+ |
| The Encyclopedia of Popular Music | 2/5 stars |
| MusicHound Rock | 3/5 stars |
| Rolling Stone | (favourable) |
| The Rolling Stone Album Guide | 3/5 stars |

The album was a commercial success, going 2× platinum in the US and Canada, gold in UK, and peaking at number 2 on the Billboard 200. The soundtrack to Grease prevented Who Are You from achieving number 1 status in the US. The success of Who Are You generated excitement at the prospect of a new Who tour for the album. The songs on the album were later performed on tour in 1979, when the Who were joined by new drummer Kenney Jones and keyboardist John Bundrick.

Reviewing in Christgau's Record Guide: Rock Albums of the Seventies (1981), Robert Christgau said: "Every time I concentrate I get off on some new detail in Daltrey's singing or Townshend's lyrics or Entwistle's bass parts—though not in Moon's drumming, and I still don't relate to the synthesizer. But I never learn anything new, and this is not my idea of fun rock and roll. It ought to be one or the other, if not both."

== Live performances ==
Across the band's entire career, only four of the songs on the album ("Sister Disco", "Music Must Change", "Trick of the Light" and "Who Are You") have been played live.

"Who Are You" was the first of the album's songs to be performed live; this was at a concert in the band's 1976 tour at the Maple Leaf Gardens in Toronto, Ontario, albeit in a very raw and abbreviated version extremely different from the finished product. Another early and abbreviated live performance with Moon can be found in The Who at Kilburn: 1977, a film of two live performances as a two-disc DVD set released in 2008. It was also played as part of the encore for the Who's 2012 Quadrophenia and More tour.

On the Who's 1979 tour, only four songs were played live: "Sister Disco", "Music Must Change", "Trick of the Light", and "Who Are You". On that tour, "Sister Disco" was played quite close to the studio version, but with the country-style acoustic guitar outro replaced by a more bluesy, electric one. The country-style outro returned in 1989 with Townshend on acoustic guitar, and in 2008–09, when he could switch his Fender from 'electric mode' to 'acoustic mode'. Townshend actually stated in an interview that this was one of his least favourite songs to perform live (the other being "Dreaming from the Waist"), as Daltrey encouraged Townshend to share a microphone whilst harmonizing on the final vocal tag, evoking a camaraderie Townshend stated didn't really exist. It was played in the tours of 1979, 1980, 1981, 1982, 1989, 2008 and 2009.

"Music Must Change" was often given an extended workout live, with performances usually ranging from seven to nine minutes. It was played in the 1979, 1980 and 1981 tours; it was rehearsed for the 2002 tour, but Entwistle died before the start of that tour and the band were not able to perform the song.

"Trick of the Light" was performed occasionally on the Who's 1979 tour, with Entwistle on eight-string bass and Townshend playing one of the Alembic basses Entwistle used on the 1975–1976 tours. It made its return to the setlist in 1989, with Townshend on electric guitar for the two Toronto dates in June, and on acoustic guitar for the rest of the tour.

The Who have not been known to play "New Song", "Had Enough", "905", "Guitar and Pen", and "Love Is Coming Down". However, the John Entwistle Band used to play the Entwistle-penned songs.

== Re-releases ==
In May 1985, MCA Records released the album on CD. There were no extra tracks on this CD, as it only contained songs from the original LP.

In 1996, the album was reissued on CD. This re-release was remixed and remastered by Jon Astley and Andy Macpherson; some of the elements from the original mixes were eliminated or changed, including an alternate guitar track on "Music Must Change", while other elements were restored, such as "Trick of the Light" being restored to its full length of 4:45. This remaster included five bonus tracks: outtakes "Empty Glass" and "No Road Romance", and alternate mixes for "Guitar and Pen", "Love Is Coming Down", and "Who Are You".

On 24 December 2011, Universal Japan reissued the original analogue mixes of the album on limited, numbered edition SHM-CD, remastered by Jon Astley. The bonus tracks from the 1996 album were also included using vintage mixes where possible; however, the full band version of "No Road Romance" was included instead of Townshend's demo from the 1996 issue. The album was reissued in a miniature replica of the vinyl album for CD. In 2014, the album was released in its original mixes on HDtracks and iTunes, along with the rest of the Who's catalogue.

On 31 October 2025, a 7CD & 1 Blu-Ray disc boxed set was released which includes unreleased Glyn Johns mixes and rehearsals, the original stereo mixes plus new stereo, Dolby Atmos and 5.1 mixes by Steven Wilson. The super deluxe edition was mastered by Jon Astley and designed by Richard Evans with sleeve notes by Matt Kent. A separate, standalone, limited edition release by Superdeluxe Edition on blu-ray also includes the original and Steven Wilson mixes plus instrumental mixes also by Steven.

== Track listing ==
All songs written by Pete Townshend, except where noted.

Original LP Release and MCA Records 1985 CD re-release

Side one
| No. | Title | Writer(s) | Length |
|---|---|---|---|
| 1. | "New Song" | | 4:12 |
| 2. | "Had Enough" | John Entwistle | 4:30 |
| 3. | "905" | Entwistle | 4:02 |
| 4. | "Sister Disco" | | 4:21 |
| 5. | "Music Must Change" | | 4:37 |

Side two
| No. | Title | Writer(s) | Length |
|---|---|---|---|
| 6. | "Trick of the Light" | Entwistle | 4:48 |
| 7. | "Guitar and Pen" | | 5:58 |
| 8. | "Love Is Coming Down" | | 4:06 |
| 9. | "Who Are You" | | 6:21 |
| Total length: | | | 42:13 |

1996 remastered edition bonus tracks
| No. | Title | Length |
|---|---|---|
| 10. | "No Road Romance" | 5:05 |
| 11. | "Empty Glass" (Demo, title track for Pete Townshend's second solo studio album Empty Glass) | 6:23 |
| 12. | "Guitar and Pen" (Olympic '78 Mix) | 6:02 |
| 13. | "Love Is Coming Down" (Work-in-Progress Mix) | 4:05 |
| 14. | "Who Are You" (Lost Verse Mix) | 6:22 |

== Personnel ==
The Who

- Roger Daltrey – lead vocals
- Pete Townshend – guitars, backing vocals, piano, synthesiser, lead vocals on "Sister Disco" (bridge), "No Road Romance" and "Empty Glass"
- John Entwistle – bass guitar, backing vocals, horns on "Had Enough" and "Music Must Change", lead vocals and synthesiser on "905"
- Keith Moon – drums, percussion, backing vocals on "Guitar and Pen"

Additional musicians

- Rod Argent – synthesiser on "Had Enough", piano on "Who Are You", keyboards on "Guitar and Pen" and (uncredited) "Love Is Coming Down"
- Ted Astley – string arrangement
- Andy Fairweather-Low – backing vocals on "New Song", "Had Enough", "Guitar and Pen", "Love Is Coming Down", and "Who Are You"
- Billy Nicholls – backing vocals on "New Song" and "Had Enough"
- Michael Nicholls – backing vocals on "Had Enough"
- (Unknown) – drums on "Music Must Change"

Technical personnel

- Glyn Johns – production
- Jon Astley – production
- Judy Szekely – engineering assistance

== Charts ==
Chart performance for Who Are You
| Chart (1978) | Peak position |
|---|---|
| Australian Albums (Kent Music Report) | 9 |
| Canada Top Albums/CDs (RPM) | 2 |
| Dutch Albums (Album Top 100) | 29 |
| German Albums (Offizielle Top 100) | 49 |
| New Zealand Albums (RMNZ) | 13 |
| Norwegian Albums (VG-lista) | 21 |
| Swedish Albums (Sverigetopplistan) | 27 |
| UK Albums (Official Charts) | 6 |
| US Billboard 200 | 2 |

| Chart (2025) | Peak position |
|---|---|
| German Rock & Metal Albums (Offizielle Top 100) | 4 |

== Certifications ==
Certifications for Who Are You
| Region | Certification | Certified units/sales |
|---|---|---|
| Canada (Music Canada) | 2× Platinum | 200,000^{^} |
| United Kingdom (BPI) | Gold | 100,000^{^} |
| United States (RIAA) | 2× Platinum | 2,000,000^{^} |
^{^} Shipments figures based on certification alone.
