= Who Are You (song) =

Song by The Who

- UK single picture sleeve

Single by the Who

from the album Who Are You
- A-side: "Had Enough"
- Released: 14 July 1978 (UK); 5 August 1978 (US)
- Recorded: 4 October 1977
- Genre: Hard rock; heavy metal
- Length: 6:20 (album version); 5:01 (single edit); 3:24 (US single edit)
- Label: Polydor 2121 361 (UK); MCA (US)
- Songwriter: Pete Townshend
- Producers: Glyn Johns; Jon Astley

The Who singles chronology
"Squeeze Box" (1975)	"Who Are You" (1978)	"Trick of the Light" (1978)

Who Are You track listing
- 9 tracks Side one: 1. "New Song"; 2. "Had Enough"; 3. "905"; 4. "Sister Disco"; 5. "Music Must Change"; Side two: 6. "Trick of the Light"; 7. "Guitar and Pen"; 8. "Love Is Coming Down"; 9. "Who Are You"

Music video
- "Who Are You" (Promo Video) on YouTube

"Who Are You" is the title track on the Who's eighth studio album, Who Are You (1978), the last album released by the band before Keith Moon's death in September 1978. It was written by Pete Townshend and released as a double A-side single with the John Entwistle composition "Had Enough", also featured on the album. The song was one of the band's biggest hits in North America, peaking at number 7 in Canada and at number 14 on the US Billboard Hot 100, and has become one of the band's signature songs at their live shows. The piano on the track is played by Rod Argent of the Zombies and Argent.

== Background ==
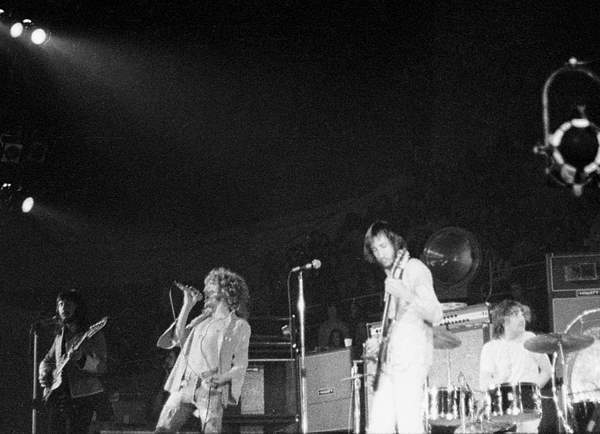
The Who performing in Charlotte, North Carolina, 1971. Events preceding this performance inspired the last verse of "Who Are You".

The lyrics of "Who Are You" were inspired by an incident Pete Townshend experienced. After going out drinking with Steve Jones and Paul Cook of the Sex Pistols, Townshend was found in a "Soho doorway" by a policeman, who recognized him and said he would let him go if he could safely walk away.

"Who Are You" was written about meeting Steve Jones and Paul Cook of the Sex Pistols after an awful 13-hour encounter with Allen Klein who, in my personal opinion, is the awesome rock leech-godfather. In one sense the song is more about the demands of new friendship than blood-letting challenge. Roger [Daltrey]'s aggressive reading of my nihilistic lyric redirected its function by the simple act of singing "Who the fuck are you..." when I had written "Who, who, who are you..." Steve and Paul became real 'mates' of mine in the English sense. We socialized a few times. Got drunk (well, I did) and I have to say to their credit, for a couple of figurehead anarchists, they seemed sincerely concerned about my decaying condition at the time.

— Pete Townshend

However, as explained by Townshend in his memoir Who I Am (2012), the last verse is about an early incident that happened on the last North American leg of the Who's 1971 tour: the day before the first concert in Charlotte, North Carolina, Townshend took the opportunity to visit the Meher Spiritual Center—a retreat owned by his guru Meher Baba—in nearby Myrtle Beach.

"Who Are You" was released as a double A-side with the John Entwistle song, "Had Enough", but "Who Are You" was the more popular song, reaching the Top 20 on both the United States Billboard Hot 100 and UK Singles Chart. The song has since been featured on multiple compilation albums. The single mix contains an alternate acoustic guitar solo to the album mix.

== Lyrics ==
The album version includes a third verse compared to the much shorter single. Additionally, a "lost verse" mix of the song was released on the 1996 reissue of Who Are You, with a completely different second verse: "I used to check my reflection / Jumping with my cheap guitar / I must have lost my direction, 'cause I ended up a superstar / One-nighters in the boardroom / Petrify the human brain / You can learn from my mistakes, but you're posing in the glass again."

The song is unusual in that it contains two instances of the word "fuck"—at 2:16 and 5:43 (at 2:14 and 4:27 in the single edit version)—yet has been played frequently in its entirety on rock radio stations (as compared to an edited form replacing it with "hell"). The expletives, while not clearly enunciated and slightly obscured by Keith Moon's drum fills, are nevertheless quite audible. This led to some controversy when ABC's unedited broadcast of the Who's Live 8 performance retained them. The American single edit changes this to "Who the hell are you?" and can be heard at 1:55. Other versions replaced the phrase with just one of the main choruses, "Tell me, who are you?" and "I really want to know."

== Critical reception ==
"Who Are You" is widely regarded as one of the band's best songs. Cashbox said that it "has a gentle, jumpy chorus riding atop driving guitar chording by Townshend" and that "Daltrey's lead vocals are gritty and inquiring." Record World said that "The instrumentation is powerful in contrast to the flowing vocal hook."

== Music video ==
A promotional music video was filmed on 9 May 1978 for The Kids Are Alright rockumentary; originally, the intent was to have the Who simply mime to the single version's backing track with Roger Daltrey adding live vocals, but the decision was made to also re-record the guitars, backing vocals, drums, and piano. Only John Entwistle's bass and the synthesizer backing remained intact from the original version.

== Live performances ==
This song was first performed live at the Gaumont State Cinema in Kilburn on 15 December 1977, albeit without synthesizers and only a portion of the lyrics. This can be seen in the film The Who at Kilburn: 1977 (2008). Despite that being the first performance, this song had its roots in jams in the band's 1976 concerts, most notably at Maple Leaf Gardens in Toronto on 21 October 1976, drummer Keith Moon's last North American appearance with the Who, where the band played a very early version of the song with Townshend on vocals.

The first live performance with synthesizers (using a backing tape of the same synthesizer track found on the studio version of the song) was at the Rainbow Theatre in London on 2 May 1979, which was also Kenney Jones's first live show with the band. Since that time it has remained a staple of their live shows. The Who opened their segment of The Concert for New York City on 20 October 2001 with the song and performed a medley featuring the song during their halftime performance at Super Bowl XLIV in 2010. They also used the song to begin their set at 12-12-12: The Concert for Sandy Relief on 12 December 2012. In later performances, Roger Daltrey also plays acoustic rhythm guitar.

== Charts ==
Chart (1978)	Peak position
Canada Top Singles (RPM)	7
Netherlands (Single Top 100)	44
New Zealand (Recorded Music NZ)	23
UK Singles (Official Charts)	18
US Billboard Hot 100	14

== Certifications ==
Region	Certification	Certified units/sales
United Kingdom (BPI)	Silver	200,000^{‡}
^{‡} Sales+streaming figures based on certification alone.

== Personnel ==
The Who

- Roger Daltrey – lead vocals
- Pete Townshend – electric guitar, acoustic guitar, synthesiser and backing vocals
- John Entwistle – bass guitar and backing vocals
- Keith Moon – drums and handclaps

Additional personnel

- Rod Argent – piano
- Andy Fairweather Low – backing vocals

== In popular culture ==
- "Who Are You" was used as background music in a scene from Nicolas Roeg's psychological drama film Bad Timing (1980).
- "Who Are You" was used as background music in the coroner scene from McG's action comedy film Charlie's Angels: Full Throttle (2003).
- "Who Are You" was used in the theatrical trailer for the action thriller film The Long Kiss Goodnight (1996).
- "Who Are You" is the theme to the 2000–2015 television series CSI: Crime Scene Investigation.
  - Furthermore, "Who Are You?", episode 6 of season 1 even took its title from the song in 2000.
  - In the series' 2006 150th episode "Living Legend" in season 7, Roger Daltrey guest-starred as Mickey Dunn.
  - A modified version was used in the opening of the television sitcom Two and a Half Men, in the 2008 fifth season episode "Fish in a Drawer", which had several references to CSI: Crime Scene Investigation.
  - The subsequent shows in the CSI franchise used other Who songs as their theme songs. "Who Are You" was used again as the theme for the 2021–2024 CSI: Crime Scene Investigation follow up series CSI: Vegas.
- The Rock Band video game series features the song as part of a 12-pack of downloadable tracks from the Who.
- The Blanks in the sitcom Scrubs perform part of the song in the 2007 season 7 episode "My Identity Crisis".
- An abbreviated version of the song was performed during the halftime show of Super Bowl XLIV.
- Louis C.K. sings along to the song in "Country Drive", a 2011 season 2 episode of the television series Louie.
- "Who Are You" is heard during the 7th season of ESPN's Gruden's QB Camp.
- "Who Are You" is used as the theme song to most international versions of the mystery singing competition series The Masked Singer including the American version.
- A parody of "Who Are You" lyrics ("Who knew, who knew?") is used in a 2025 commercial for Walmart.
