= The Punk and the Godfather =

Song by The Who

Song by the Who

from the album Quadrophenia
- Released: October 19, 1973
- Recorded: May 1972 and June–August 1973
- Genre: Rock
- Length: 5:10
- Label: MCA
- Songwriter: Pete Townshend
- Producers: The Who, Kit Lambert

"The Punk and the Godfather" (titled "The Punk Meets the Godfather" on the US album) is a song written by Pete Townshend, the guitarist for the Who, for their sixth studio album, Quadrophenia (1973).

== Lyrics ==
In "The Punk and the Godfather", the protagonist of Quadrophenia, Jimmy, goes to see a mod band perform, only to be disappointed that the band were just part of the mod culture that made up the audience. In the song, Townshend was "apparently... also trying to understand the roots of the Who, its attraction as rallying point and its eventual rejection by such as Jimmy", according to a review in Rolling Stone. According to Who biographer John Atkins, Jimmy "questions the balance of power that prevails between rock star and fan." Pete Townshend said of the song's lyrics:

The hero goes to a rock concert. He queues up, pays his money and he decides he is going to see the stars backstage as they come out the stage door. And one of them comes up and says 'fuck off!' And he suddenly realizes that there's nothing really happening in rock & roll. It's just another cross on his list.

The song quotes the Who's 1965 hit single, "My Generation" and the opening evokes another early Who single, "Anyway, Anyhow, Anywhere".

== Composition ==
According to the sheet music published at Musicnotes.com by Sony/ATV Music Publishing, the song is set in the time signature of common time. It is composed in the key of A major with Roger Daltrey's vocal range spanning from D_{3} to B_{4}. John Entwistle provided a melodic bass line that is very prominent in "The Punk and the Godfather".

== Reception ==
Richie Unterberger of Allmusic highlighted the song as one of the best tracks on Quadrophenia. Caryn Rose, writing for Billboard, called the song "One of the record's iconic moments, the song opens with clanging power chords, perfectly interspersed percussion, and majestic vocals. This track is trademark Who, period." A review in PopMatters said the song "serves as an epitaph—for Townshend, and every rock legend that had the audacity to not die young—to the decidedly anti-rock notion of growing old."

== Live performance ==
"The Punk and the Godfather" was first performed live during the Who's 1973 tour that was used to promote Quadrophenia. It has since become a live favorite, being performed on multiple tours since.
