= Sister Disco =

Song by The Who

Song by the Who

from the album Who Are You
- Released: 18 August 1978
- Recorded: October 1977 – April 1978
- Genre: Rock; funk rock; dance rock
- Length: 4:21
- Label: Polydor (UK); MCA (US)
- Songwriter: Pete Townshend
- Producers: Glyn Johns; Jon Astley

Official audio
- "Sister Disco" on YouTube

"Sister Disco" is the fourth track from the Who's eighth studio album, Who Are You (1978). It was written by Pete Townshend.

== Background ==
"Sister Disco" features complicated synthesizer tracks that are the result of hours Pete Townshend spent programming an ARP 2500 synthesizer.

For this track I spent a lot of hours programming my analogue sequencers in my ARP 2500 studio synthesizer. It isn't quite Kraftwerk, but in 1976 I don't think they were doing much better. This is a perfect example of the progression I was making towards theatrical music writing. I was trying to evoke absurd Baron Munchausen musical textures. Roger [Daltrey] sounds so seriously intent about everything that the pomposity becomes real and threatening rather than pictorial.

— Pete Townshend

Pete Townshend has claimed that the song was written as a statement that the Who would never use disco elements in their music.

With 'Sister Disco', I felt the need to say that the group would never, ever, in any way do anything like the Bee Gees. We stand over here and what we stand with is all right. They might say we're boring old farts but we still feel more at home with the boring old farts than any of that crowd.

— Pete Townshend, 1978

A music video for "Sister Disco" was also produced. The video was the 81st video ever shown on MTV. It was a concert clip taken from the Concert for the People of Kampuchea (1979).

== Lyrics ==
"Sister Disco" seems to mourn the death of disco, although it could be construed to be a criticism of it. However, the lyrics have been regarded by many, including Daltrey, as confusing.

I really like 'Sister Disco' but I don't necessarily understand what he's saying. I do understand what he's trying to say but I don't know whether it comes off. It was a song about getting too old for discos and that whole line that Pete sings, 'Goodbye Sister Disco, I go where the music fits my soul,' is kind of operatic; it's a bit pompous. That's why I personally didn't sing that line because I can't...when Pete sings it he's got enough kind of tongue-in-cheek quality to get away with it and it works, but if I sang it, it would be a total disaster.

— Roger Daltrey

It's got nothing to do with disco at all! It's only a series of lines put together. The chorus 'Goodbye Sister Disco, now I go where the music fits my soul'...that is not an indictment of disco music. I like a lot of disco music; I even like discos. It's to do with saying goodbye to, I think, a sort of self-conscious poseur kind of thing The Who had been for such a long time.

— Pete Townshend

== Critical reception ==
Like the rest of Who Are You, "Sister Disco" received mixed reception. Authors Alan G. Parker and Steve Grantley said that the song was "neither a meaningful lyric nor a memorable melody ... it all sounds too much like hard work – and not enough inspiration." AllMusic critic Richie Unterberger cited the track as a highlight of Who Are You, but noted it as one of the album's "blustery attempts at contemporary relevance".

== Live history ==
"Sister Disco" was never performed with Keith Moon. However, it was performed regularly when the Who toured with Kenney Jones as drummer, and quickly became a live favourite, despite Townshend's claim that it was his least favourite song to perform. After not being part of the Who's setlists for several years, it was revived for their fall 2008 tour. A live recording of the song was featured on the double album Concerts for the People of Kampuchea (1981).
