= The Who at Kilburn: 1977 =

2008 film by various directors

- Directed by: Jeff Stein; The Who; Chris Stamp; Kit Lambert
- Produced by: Nigel Sinclair
- Starring: Roger Daltrey; Pete Townshend; John Entwistle; Keith Moon
- Edited by: Mark Stepp; Parris Patton
- Music by: Pete Townshend; John Entwistle; Keith Moon; Eddie Cochran; Jerry Capehart; Johnny Kidd; Allen Toussaint; Mose Allison
- Production company: Spitfire Pictures
- Distributed by: Image Entertainment
- Release date: 17 November 2008 (United Kingdom)
- Running time: 138 minutes
- Language: English

The Who at Kilburn: 1977 is a film of two live performances by the English rock band the Who released as a two-disc DVD set on 17 November 2008 by Image Entertainment. The first disc included the band's performance at the Gaumont State Cinema on 15 December 1977, while the second disc featured the band's performance at the London Coliseum on 14 December 1969. The film restoration was produced by Nigel Sinclair's Spitfire Pictures in association with Trinifold Management.

The Kilburn show was recorded for Jeff Stein's documentary film The Kids Are Alright and was The Who's first show in over a year. However, due to sound problems, it was shelved for over 30 years, with only two small portions of the whole gig actually made it to The Kids Are Alright: Townshend saying "There's a guitar up here, if any big-mouthed little git wants to come up and fucking take it off me"; and when all four members of the band meet in the centre of the stage after the conclusion of the show. "My Wife", however, made it to the soundtrack of The Kids Are Alright, albeit without any sound restoration, and slightly shortened (comparisons to bootleg versions of this show indicate portions of John Entwistle's vocals were later overdubbed to correct pitch errors). It includes their first ever live performance of "Who Are You", which would also be their last performance of the song with Moon on stage.

The Coliseum concert on 14 December 1969 was recorded during a tour of European opera houses. Combined with the features in the Extras, nearly the entire performance can be seen.

== Background, production and restoration ==
The footage for the two concerts that appeared on The Who at Kilburn: 1977 was found by Nick Ryle in 2002. The first recorded performance, at the Coliseum, was filmed by Chris Stamp and Kit Lambert—who were the group's managers at that time—using 16 mm film with the music being recorded on a two-track tape recorder in 1969. The 16mm cameras had 12 minutes roll so as one was running the rest were reloaded. The concert at the Gaumont State Theatre was filmed by Jeff Stein and the Who using 35mm film and a 16-track tape recorder. It was the Who's first show in a year.

The Who at Kilburn: 1977 was produced by Nigel Sinclair, who also produced Amazing Journey: The Story of The Who, with executive producers Bill Curbishley, Robert Rosenberg, and Paul Crowder. The sound on the recordings was mixed and balanced by Paul Clay with help from Jon Astley. The film footage was edited by Mark Stepp and Parris Patton.

== Songs performed ==
=== Disc 1: The Who at Kilburn 1977 ===
1. "I Can't Explain" (3:10)
2. "Substitute" (2:59)
3. "Baba O'Riley" (5:18)
4. "My Wife" (7:02)
5. "Behind Blue Eyes" (3:33)
6. "Dreaming from the Waist" (5:10)
7. "Pinball Wizard" (2:43)
8. "I'm Free" (2:45)
9. "Tommy's Holiday Camp" (1:29)
10. "Summertime Blues" (3:45)
11. "Shakin' All Over" (5:00)
12. "My Generation" (3:44)
13. "Join Together" (2:28)
14. "Who Are You" (6:04)
15. "Won't Get Fooled Again" (8:49)
16. "(End Credits)" (1:33)

=== Disc 2: Main Title – The Who at the Coliseum 1969 ===
1. "Heaven and Hell" (4:23)
2. "I Can't Explain" (2:47)
3. "Fortune Teller" (2:39)
4. "Tattoo" (3:37)
5. "Young Man Blues" (11:10)
6. "A Quick One, While He's Away" [edited] (3:48)
7. "Happy Jack" (2:15)
8. "I'm a Boy" (2:54)
9. "There's a Doctor" (0:22)
10. "Go to the Mirror!" (3:25)
11. "I'm Free" (2:23)
12. "Tommy's Holiday Camp" (0:48)
13. "See Me, Feel Me" (5:07)
14. "Summertime Blues" (3:21)
15. "Shakin' All Over" (7:12)
16. "My Generation" (15:07)
17. "(End Credits)" (1:30)

== Extras ==
On Disc 2 in the main title movie (total time of 1:12:48), the full performances of the group's rock opera, Tommy, and mini-opera, "A Quick One, While He's Away" (from the album, A Quick One) from the Coliseum show were both edited significantly. The full performances (with a total time of 1:10:33) are located in the extras menu. "Substitute" (performed just before "Happy Jack") is the only song performed at the show that is missing from the DVD. The movie trailer for the entire release is also included in the extras.

=== A Quick One, While He's Away ===
1. "Introduction" (6:03)
2. "A Quick One, While He's Away" (11:46)

=== Tommy ===
1. "Overture" (5:44)
2. "It's a Boy" (0:33)
3. "1921" (2:33)
4. "Amazing Journey / Sparks" (8:27)
5. "Eyesight to the Blind (The Hawker)" (1:57)
6. "Christmas" (3:15)
7. "The Acid Queen" (3:27)
8. "Pinball Wizard" (2:46)
9. "Do You Think It's Alright?" (0:22)
10. "Fiddle About" (1:15)
11. "Tommy Can You Hear Me?" (0:56)
12. "There's a Doctor" (0:22)
13. "Go to the Mirror!" (3:25)
14. "Smash the Mirror" (1:15)
15. "Miracle Cure" (0:14)
16. "Sally Simpson" (4:01)
17. "I'm Free" (2:25)
18. "Tommy's Holiday Camp" (0:58)
19. "We're Not Gonna Take It" (8:47)

=== "The Who at Kilburn Trailer" ===
1. "(Trailer)" (1:31)

== Personnel ==
- Roger Daltrey – lead vocals;
- Pete Townshend – guitar, background vocals;
- John Entwistle – bass, background vocals, lead vocals in "Heaven and Hell" and "Fiddle About" (London coliseum concert 1969) and "My Wife" (Kilburn 1977 concert)
- Keith Moon – drums, background vocals; lead vocals in "Tommy's Holiday Camp" (Live at London Coliseum concert 1969) and (Live at Kilburn concert 1977)

== Charts ==
Chart (2008)	Peak position
Australian Top 40 Music DVDs	33
Belgium (Flanders) Top 10 Music DVDs	9
Belgium (Wallonia) Top 10 Music DVDs	5
Italian Top 20 Music DVDs	9
Netherlands Top 30 Music DVDs	23
Swedish Top 20 DVDs	11
