= The Kids Are Alright (soundtrack) =

1979 album

Soundtrack album by the Who
- Released: 8 June 1979
- Recorded: 1965–1978
- Genre: Rock
- Length: 79:35
- Labels: Polydor (UK); MCA (US)
- Producer: Various

The Who chronology
Who Are You (1978)	The Kids Are Alright (1979)	Quadrophenia (1979)

Professional ratings
Review scores
Source	Rating
AllMusic	4/5 stars
The Encyclopedia of Popular Music	3/5 stars
MusicHound Rock	3/5
The Rolling Stone Album Guide	4/5 stars
The Village Voice	B

The Kids Are Alright is a soundtrack album by the English rock band the Who, a companion to the band's documentary film of the same name. As a compilation album, it serves as a retrospective look at the band's biggest hits throughout their career to the point it was released. Most of the tracks are live recordings, rather than the original studio versions.

It was originally released as a double album in June 1979 on Polydor Records in the UK and MCA Records in the US. The performance of "My Wife" was from a concert the Who filmed for The Kids Are Alright at the Gaumont State Cinema in Kilburn; however the footage was not used in the film. That show was later restored for DVD and released as The Who at Kilburn: 1977 in 2008. "Tommy Can You Hear Me" had a longer outro with Roger Daltrey repeating the word "Tommy" before Keith Moon screams "'Ello!" to end the song. The soundtrack album did well in the US where it peaked at No. 8 on the Billboard albums chart and went platinum, while it peaked at No. 26 on the UK charts.

The Kids Are Alright soundtrack album was reissued in its original packaging with the 20-page booklet and two LPs on coloured vinyl (LP1 on red vinyl, LP2 on blue vinyl) for Record Store Day in 2018.

== Track listing ==
All tracks written and composed by Pete Townshend, except where noted.

No.	Title	Recording venue and date	Length
1.	"My Generation"	The Smothers Brothers Comedy Hour, 15 September 1967	4:32
2.	"I Can't Explain"	Twickenham Film Studios, 3 August 1965	2:01
3.	"Happy Jack (not used in the film)"	University of Leeds Refectory, 14 February 1970	2:13
4.	"I Can See for Miles (not used in the film)"	credited as from The Smothers Brothers Comedy Hour, 15 September 1967; actually a new stereo remix of the standard studio version	4:19
5.	"Magic Bus"	Beat-Club, 12 October 1968; actually a simulated stereo mix of the single version	3:23
6.	"Long Live Rock"	Olympic Studios, Barnes, London, 5 June 1972; different mix from the version featured on the Odds & Sods album	3:58
7.	"Anyway, Anyhow, Anywhere" (Townshend, Roger Daltrey)	Ready Steady Go!, 1 July 1965	2:50
8.	"Young Man Blues" (Mose Allison)	Coliseum, London, 14 December 1969	5:46
9.	"My Wife (not used in the film)" (John Entwistle)	Gaumont State Theatre, Kilburn, London, 15 December 1977	6:07
10.	"Baba O'Riley"	Shepperton Film Studios, London, 25 May 1978	5:29
11.	"A Quick One, While He's Away"	The Rolling Stones Rock and Roll Circus film, recorded on 11 December 1968	7:32
12.	"Tommy Can You Hear Me?"	Beat-Club, 27 September 1969	1:47
13.	"Sparks"	Woodstock festival, New York, 17 August 1969	3:01
14.	"Pinball Wizard"	Woodstock festival, New York, 17 August 1969	2:48
15.	"See Me, Feel Me"	Woodstock festival, New York 17 August 1969	5:27
16.	"Join Together/Road Runner/My Generation Blues (Medley)" (Townshend/McDaniel)	Pontiac Silverdome, Pontiac, Michigan on 6 December 1975; not featured on early CD pressings	9:55
17.	"Won't Get Fooled Again"	Shepperton Film Studios, London, 25 May 1978	9:58

== Vinyl track listing ==
Reel One

1. "My Generation"
2. "I Can't Explain"
3. "Happy Jack"
4. "I Can See for Miles"
5. "Magic Bus"
6. "Long Live Rock"

Reel Two

1. "Anyway, Anyhow, Anywhere"
2. "Young Man Blues"
3. "My Wife"
4. "Baba O'Riley"

Reel Three

1. "A Quick One"
2. "Tommy Can You Hear Me?"
3. "Sparks"
4. "Pinball Wizard"
5. "See Me, Feel Me"

Reel Four

1. "Join Together"
2. "Roadrunner"
3. "My Generation Blues"
4. "Won't Get Fooled Again"

== Personnel ==
The Who

- Roger Daltrey – vocals, harmonica
- Pete Townshend – guitars, keyboards, vocals
- John Entwistle – bass guitar, keyboards, vocals, musical director
- Keith Moon – drums, vocals

Design

- Bill Curbishley – sleeve concept
- Chris Chappel – sleeve concept
- Richard Evans – sleeve concept, design, illustration
- Art Kane – photography
- Michael Zagaris – photography
- Roy Carr – liner notes

== Charts ==
=== Weekly charts ===
Chart (1979)	Peak position
Canada Top Albums/CDs (RPM)	10
New Zealand Albums (RMNZ)	30
UK Albums (Official Charts)	26
US Billboard 200	8

=== Year-end charts ===
Chart (1979)	Position
Canada Top Albums/CDs (RPM)	48

== Certifications ==
Region	Certification	Certified units/sales
Canada (Music Canada)	Gold	50,000^{^}
United Kingdom (BPI)	Gold	100,000^{‡}
United States (RIAA)	Platinum	1,000,000^{^}
^{^} Shipments figures based on certification alone.^{‡} Sales+streaming figures based on certification alone.
