= Tommy (soundtrack) =

Soundtrack album by the Who
- Released: 19 March 1975
- Recorded: January–March 1974
- Studios: Ramport and Eel Pie, London
- Genres: Hard rock; art rock; progressive rock
- Length: 90:35
- Label: Polydor
- Producers: The Who (except "Pinball Wizard," produced by Gus Dudgeon)

The Who chronology
Odds & Sods (1974)	Tommy (1975)	The Who by Numbers (1975)

Singles from Tommy soundtrack
- 1. "Pinball Wizard" Released: 12 March 1976

Tommy is a soundtrack album by the English rock band the Who with contributions from numerous artists. The soundtrack was used in the 1975 Tommy film that was based on the original album that was released by the Who in 1969. Pete Townshend oversaw the production of this double-LP recording that returned the music to its rock roots, and on which the unrecorded orchestral arrangements he had envisaged for the original Tommy LP were realised by the extensive use of synthesiser. The versions on the soundtrack album are notably shorter than the full arrangements used in the film.

The soundtrack LP also employed many leading session musicians including Caleb Quaye, Phil Chen and Nicky Hopkins (who also receives a "Special Thanks" in the album credits for help with the arrangements), as well as the Faces members Ronnie Wood and future Keith Moon replacement Kenney Jones.

While multiple scenes depict the Who as a backing band, not all songs were recorded by each member of the band. For example, the film scene for "Pinball Wizard" depicts Elton John being backed by the Who (dressed in pound-note suits). The music for this song is actually performed by "The Elton John Band", as he called his musical team, and produced by his regular producer Gus Dudgeon. All of the remaining music was produced by Townshend, who also performed additional synthesizer and/or guitar on all tracks. Credits to "The Who" indicate performances by Townshend, John Entwistle and Moon jointly, regardless of vocalist.

== Track listing ==
All songs are written and composed by Pete Townshend, except where noted. (For narrative, see Tommy (1975 film).)

Bonus track on CD reissues (CD 1)
No.	Title	Performer	Length
1.	"Overture from Tommy"	Pete Townshend	5:01

LP side one (cassette side 1, CD 1)
No.	Title	...	Length
1.	"Prologue – 1945"	Pete Townshend and John Entwistle	2:55
2.	"Captain Walker/It's a Boy"	Pete Townshend, Margo Newman and Vicki Brown	2:38
3.	"Bernie's Holiday Camp"	Oliver Reed, Alison Dowling and Ann-Margret	3:42
4.	"1951/What About The Boy?"	Ann-Margret and Oliver Reed	2:49
5.	"Amazing Journey"	Pete Townshend	3:19
6.	"Christmas"	Ann-Margret, Alison Dowling and Oliver Reed	3:59
7.	"Eyesight to the Blind" (Willie "Sonny Boy" Williamson)	Eric Clapton	3:21

LP side two (cassette side 1, CD 1)
No.	Title	...	Length
1.	"The Acid Queen"	Tina Turner	3:47
2.	"Do You Think It's Alright? (1)"	Ann-Margret and Oliver Reed	0:57
3.	"Cousin Kevin" (John Entwistle)	Paul Nicholas	3:07
4.	"Do You Think It's Alright? (2)"	Ann-Margret and Oliver Reed	0:46
5.	"Fiddle About" (John Entwistle)	Keith Moon	1:40
6.	"Do You Think It's Alright? (3)"	Ann-Margret and Oliver Reed	0:29
7.	"Sparks"	Instrumental	3:07
8.	"Extra, Extra, Extra"	Simon Townshend	0:37
9.	"Pinball Wizard"	Elton John	5:22

LP side three (cassette side 2, CD 2)
No.	Title	...	Length
1.	"Champagne"	Ann-Margret and Roger Daltrey	4:43
2.	"There's a Doctor"	Oliver Reed and Ann-Margret	0:29
3.	"Go to the Mirror"	Jack Nicholson, Roger Daltrey and Ann-Margret	3:49
4.	"Tommy, Can You Hear Me?"	Ann-Margret	0:55
5.	"Smash the Mirror!"	Ann-Margret	1:22
6.	"I'm Free"	Roger Daltrey	2:36
7.	"Mother and Son"	Ann-Margret and Roger Daltrey	2:36
8.	"Sensation"	Roger Daltrey	2:49

LP side four (cassette side 2, CD 2)
No.	Title	...	Length
1.	"Miracle Cure"	Simon Townshend	0:23
2.	"Sally Simpson"	Pete Townshend and Roger Daltrey	5:38
3.	"Welcome"	Roger Daltrey, Ann-Margret and Oliver Reed	4:15
4.	"T.V. Studio"	Ann-Margret and Oliver Reed	1:14
5.	"Tommy's Holiday Camp" (Keith Moon)	Keith Moon	1:29
6.	"We're Not Gonna Take It"	Roger Daltrey with the vocal chorus	4:46
7.	"See Me, Feel Me/Listening to You"	Roger Daltrey with the vocal chorus	4:19

The Who:

- Roger Daltrey – vocals for (grown up) "Tommy" ("Young Tommy" vocals by Alison Dowling)
- John Entwistle – bass, brass overdubs
- Keith Moon – drums, vocals for "Uncle Ernie"
- Pete Townshend – guitars, synthesizers, keyboards, bass, drums, vocals for "Narrator"

=== "Overture from Tommy" ===
- The Who

=== "Prologue – 1945" ===
- John Entwistle – brass overdubs
- Pete Townshend – all other instruments

=== "Captain Walker/It's a Boy" ===
- Pete Townshend – all instruments

=== "Bernie's Holiday Camp" ===
- The Who

=== "1951/What about the Boy?" ===
- Nicky Hopkins – piano
- Mike Kellie – drums
- Mick Ralphs, Caleb Quaye – guitar
- Chris Stainton – organ

=== "Amazing Journey" ===
- Phil Chen – bass
- Nicky Hopkins – piano
- Tony Newman – drums

=== "Christmas" ===
- Nicky Hopkins – piano
- Vocal chorus – backing vocals

=== "Eyesight to the Blind" ===
- Eric Clapton – vocals and guitar
- Kenney Jones – drums
- Arthur Brown – vocals

=== "Acid Queen" ===
- Tina Turner – vocals
- Kenney Jones – drums
- Nicky Hopkins – piano
- Ronnie Wood – guitar

=== "Do You Think It's Alright?" (1, 2, and 3) ===
- Phil Chen – bass
- Graham Deakin – drums
- Nicky Hopkins – piano
- Alan Ross – acoustic guitar

=== "Cousin Kevin" ===
- Tony Newman – drums
- Dave Wintour – bass

=== "Fiddle About" ===
- The Who

=== "Sparks" ===
- The Who

=== "Extra, Extra, Extra" ===
- Kenney Jones – drums
- Alan Ross – acoustic guitar
- Tony Stevens – bass

=== "Pinball Wizard" ===
- Elton John – lead vocals and piano
- Davey Johnstone – guitar
- Dee Murray – bass
- Nigel Olsson – drums
- Ray Cooper – percussion

=== "Champagne" ===
- The Who

=== "There's a Doctor" ===
- Kenney Jones – drums
- Alan Ross – acoustic guitar
- Chris Stainton – piano
- Ronnie Wood – guitar

=== "Go to the Mirror" ===
- Richard Bailey – drums
- Phil Chen – bass
- Nicky Hopkins – piano
- Caleb Quaye – guitar

=== "Tommy, Can You Hear Me?" ===
- Nicky Hopkins – piano
- Alan Ross, Chris Stainton – acoustic guitar

=== "Smash the Mirror!" ===
- Kenney Jones – drums
- Alan Ross – acoustic guitar

=== "I'm Free" ===
- Nicky Hopkins – piano
- Kenney Jones – drums

=== "Mother and Son" ===
- Pete Townshend – all instruments except bass (John Entwistle)

=== "Sensation" ===
- Phil Chen – bass
- Nicky Hopkins – piano
- Alan Ross – acoustic guitar

=== "Miracle Cure" ===
- Kenney Jones – drums
- Alan Ross – acoustic guitar
- Tony Stevens – bass

=== "Sally Simpson" ===
- Phil Chen – bass
- Eric Clapton – guitar
- Graham Deakin – drums
- Nicky Hopkins – piano

=== "Welcome" ===
- Pete Townshend – all instruments

=== "T.V. Studio" ===
- Pete Townshend – all instruments

=== "Tommy's Holiday Camp" ===
- Gerald Shaw – organ

=== "We're Not Gonna Take It" ===
- Nicky Hopkins – piano
- Mike Kelly – drums
- Alan Ross – acoustic guitar
- Fuzzy Samuels – bass
- Chris Stainton – organ
- Caleb Quaye – guitar
- Vocal chorus – backing vocals

=== "See Me, Feel Me/Listening to You" ===
The Who, plus:

- Nicky Hopkins – piano
- Chris Stainton – organ
- Vocal chorus – backing vocals

== Charts ==
=== Weekly charts ===
1975 weekly chart performance for Tommy
Chart (1975)	Peak position
Australian Albums (Kent Music Report)	6
Canada Top Albums/CDs (RPM)	2
Dutch Albums (Album Top 100)	11
Italian Albums (Musica e Dischi)	7
New Zealand Albums (RMNZ)	5
Norwegian Albums (VG-lista)	15
UK Albums (Official Charts)	21
US Billboard 200	2

2007 weekly chart performance for Tommy
Chart (2007)	Peak position
Spanish Albums (Promusicae)	91

=== Year-end charts ===
Year-end chart performance for Tommy
Chart (1975)	Position
Australian Albums (Kent Music Report)	22
Canada Top Albums/CDs (RPM)	15
US Billboard 200	17

== Certifications ==
Certifications for Tommy
Region	Certification	Certified units/sales
Canada (Music Canada)	Gold	50,000^{^}
United Kingdom (BPI)	Gold	100,000^{^}
United States (RIAA)	Gold	500,000^{^}
^{^} Shipments figures based on certification alone.
