= The Who Special Edition EP =

- Starring: The Who; Roger Daltrey; John Entwistle; Keith Moon; Pete Townshend
- Music by: The Who
- Production company: Classic Pictures
- Distributed by: Classic Pictures
- Release date: 25 March 2003
- Running time: 70 min.
- Language: English

The Who Special Edition EP is a video album released in 2003 by Classic Pictures that contains four performances by the Who on the German television program Beat-Club. All of the performances are lip-synced.

== Songs performed ==
1. "See Me, Feel Me" (1969)
2. "I'm a Boy" (1966)
3. "Pinball Wizard" (1969)
4. "I'm Free" (1969)
