= Go to the Mirror! =

Single by the Who

from the album Tommy
- B-side: "I'm Free"
- Released: May 23, 1969
- Genre: Hard rock
- Length: 3:49
- Label: Polydor
- Songwriter: Pete Townshend
- Producer: Kit Lambert

The Who singles chronology
"Pinball Wizard" (1969)	"Go to the Mirror!" (1969)	"I'm Free" (1969)

"Go to the Mirror!" is a song written by Pete Townshend of the Who. It appears as the fifteenth track on the band's first rock opera, Tommy (1969).

== About ==
Author Chris Charlesworth describes "Go to the Mirror!" as a "key Tommy song". The song advances the plot describing Tommy's healing process progressing through his ability to see his reflection.

It is sung by a doctor who tells Tommy's parents that, after numerous tests, there is nothing medically wrong with him, and his problems, while very real ("He seems to be completely unreceptive / The tests I gave him show no sense at all"), are psychosomatic ("All hope lies with him, and none with me"). However, as they are trying to reach him, Tommy's subconscious is also trying to reach out to them ("See me, feel me / Touch me, heal me").

In the movie version of Tommy, the doctor is played by Jack Nicholson. In the Broadway musical's original 1993 production, the song was sung by Norm Lewis and Alice Ripley, who played the Doctor and his Assistant, respectively. In the Film Version, the line "Go to the Mirror Boy,” the track’s title, is left out of the lyrics, as well as the "Listening to You" verse which was included in the original version by The Who.

The song invokes two recurring themes of the album, "See Me, Feel Me", and "Listening to You", which first appear (in lyric form) as the "Christmas" interlude, and is also the song cycle's finale (as part of the track "We're Not Gonna Take It"). This version in "Go to the Mirror!" is sung by Pete Townshend rather than Roger Daltrey. Though Daltrey sings the majority of Tommy's parts, here he has been singing as the Doctor, so Townshend singing as Tommy provides effective contrast.

The original demo Townshend recorded for the song includes one extra verse not used in the final recording, "I've kicked him, licked him, rubbed him, hit him, loved him / Everything in vain to let him know / I'm here my son, your dad, I wait for your sign / And in my heart frustration overflows." The song was also to be followed by the 10-second track titled "Success", but it was ultimately dropped.

The repeating chords in this song are E, B, and A. After two lines with those chords, the third line goes from a G# into a C#m (then two hits on a B chord to end the line.) The fourth and final line of the chorus is almost all on A chords and ends on a B7.

== Release ==
"Go to the Mirror!" was released as a single in Australia, backed with "I'm Free".

== Personnel ==
The Who

- Roger Daltrey – lead vocals
- Pete Townshend – guitar, keyboards, backing vocals, co-lead vocals
- John Entwistle – bass guitar, backing vocals
- Keith Moon – drums
