= Chris Stamp =

British music producer and manager (1942–2012)

Background information
- Born: Christopher Thomas Stamp; 7 July 1942; London, England
- Died: 24 November 2012 (aged 70) New York City, US
- Occupation: Record producer
- Years active: 1964–2012
- Label: Track

Christopher Thomas Stamp (7 July 1942 – 24 November 2012) was an English record producer and manager known for co-managing and producing such musical acts as the Who and Jimi Hendrix in the 1960s and 1970s and co-founding the now defunct Track Records. He later became a psychodrama therapist based in New York State.

== Childhood ==
Born into a working-class family, Stamp was raised in London's East End and was one of six children. Their father, Thomas Stamp, was a tugboat captain, and their mother was Ethel (née Perrott). Actor Terence Stamp was his older brother.

== Career in film and music ==
Stamp started out as a filmmaker and met business partner and collaborator Kit Lambert while working at Shepperton Film Studios as an assistant director—they both worked on such films as I Could Go On Singing, The L-Shaped Room and Of Human Bondage. Eventually the pair came to share a flat in west London, and in 1963 Lambert convinced Stamp that the two should direct their own film about the burgeoning British rock scene. "Our idea was to find a group that somehow represented the emerging ideas of our time. They would be rebellious, anarchistic and uniquely different from the established English pop scene," said Stamp.

Stamp and Lambert met the members of the Who during one of their performances at the Railway Hotel (no longer standing) in Harrow and Wealdstone. At that time the band was known as The High Numbers.

Stamp and Lambert's contrasting personalities and backgrounds also made an impression on the band; in a 1972 Rolling Stone article Keith Moon said that the two men "were...are...as incongruous a team as [the Who] are". Lambert was an Oxford graduate and the son of noted composer Constant Lambert; he spoke proper and high-class English. In contrast, Stamp was five years younger, the son of a tug-boatman, and Keith Moon described Stamp as speaking "in nearly unintelligible East London cockney". Roger Daltrey said the following about the pair:

Kit Lambert and Chris Stamp were the fifth and sixth members of The Who: Kit, with his outrageous behaviour and ideas on how to manipulate the media, and Chris, the expert in cool, menace, and scams! Their contribution to the band should never be underestimated.

The duo made a move to acquire the High Numbers from their manager Peter Meaden; Lambert had learned from The Beatles' attorney David Jacobs that the band's contract with their previous manager was legally invalid. In effect, Meaden had no legal claim to the band and in 1964 he accepted a buyout for relinquishing control to Stamp and Lambert.

By autumn of that same year Stamp and Lambert convinced the band to change their name back to the Who (a name they were using prior to Meaden's management) and began to focus on the band's Mod image. They encouraged the Who to add more blues, James Brown, and Motown covers to their sets, as these styles were especially popular with Mod audiences.

Stamp and Lambert shot a short promotional movie for the Who in 1964 which they would sometimes show at the band's live performances, before they would take to the stage. Drawing from their filmmaking backgrounds, the duo also began to focus on the Who's stage show. They sent the band for lessons on how to apply stage makeup, and began to insist that the band have control of its own stage lighting during shows, which was virtually unheard of at the time. On occasion, Stamp and Lambert even became part of the act themselves; during one performance in 1966 they lit and tossed fire bombs onto the stage as the band played.

By late 1966, with two hit albums by the Who under their belts, Stamp and Lambert established their own record label. The following year they signed artist Jimi Hendrix and founded Track Record Records, eventually known simply as just Track Records. Soon the label released its first single, "Purple Haze", followed by their first album, Are You Experienced. Track Records went on to profit from hit singles such as "Fire" by the band the Crazy World of Arthur Brown, which reached No. 1 in the UK and Canada and No. 2 on the US Billboard charts, as well as "Eight Miles High" by the Byrds, which reached No. 14 on the Billboard Hot 100. Stamp and Lambert also helped launch the Who's seminal rock opera Tommy.

During a 2005 interview, Roger Daltrey stated the following about Tommy:

We thought, at least it's dangerous. And we were under the wing of two great managers – Kit Lambert and Chris Stamp. They made us believe that if we made it dangerous it would work. It was a period when the record industry was growing so fast and the business couldn't keep up. Bands were leading the way; it was driven by the art and not the business. Now it's driven by the business.

Stamp and Lambert profited well from the music business and were living the lifestyles of the rock stars they managed, which (as Stamp would later admit) also included heavy consumption of drugs: "We were out to lunch, no doubt about that," he said. As the 1970s progressed, the members of the Who were beset by many physical and emotional setbacks, and Lambert's drug use also became so heavy that he began dipping into the Who's royalties. By 1975 Stamp and Lambert were ousted by the band in favour of manager Bill Curbishley, and the pair relocated to New York City to produce American R&B/soul group Labelle. Track Records continued with releases by Shakin Stevens and The Heartbreakers but folded in 1978.

Following the demise of Track Records, Stamp remained in New York, but Kit Lambert had moved to Italy, dying in 1981 of a brain haemorrhage while at his mother's London home. Stamp's drug and alcohol use continued, and in 1987 he entered a drug rehabilitation programme; the experience helped to inspire Stamp to assist others with their addictions and he began to study experiential therapies, including psychodrama.

Chris Stamp continued to work on Who-related projects and to give interviews about his forays into the music business. He provided liner notes for the 1995 re-release of the Who's 1966 album A Quick One, and provided a foreword to the 2005 re-release of the Who biography Anyway Anyhow Anywhere: The Complete Chronicle of the Who 1958–1978. In 2005, he also gave an informal presentation at the Rock and Roll Hall of Fame as part of their programme "From Songwriters to Soundmen: The People Behind the Hits". He also sat on the advisory board of the John Entwistle Foundation, formed in honour of the Who's bass guitarist.

In 2014, an American documentary film was made about Kit Lambert and Chris Stamp entitled, Lambert & Stamp. It was produced and directed by James D. Cooper. It had its world premiere at 2014 Sundance Film Festival on 20 January 2014.

== Career in psychotherapy ==
Until his death Stamp worked as a psychodrama therapist and addiction counsellor. Trained at the Psychodrama Institute of New York and the Hudson Valley Psychodrama Institute, he was a Licensed Mental Health Counsellor (LMHC), a Credentialed Alcoholism and Substance Abuse Counsellor (CASAC), a Certified Experiential Therapist (CET), and an Auricular Acupuncture Detox Specialist (ADS). He worked as a consultant for the Freedom Institute in New York City and kept a private practice in East Hampton, New York.

== Death ==
Stamp died of cancer on 24 November 2012 at Mount Sinai Hospital in New York City. He was survived by his wife of 33 years, Calixte, his daughters Rosie and Amie, his sons-in-law Edmund and Nicholas and several grandchildren; Betsy, Thomas, Gracie, Evie, Esmé and Maggie as well as his elder brother Terence, younger brothers Richard and John, and sister Lynette. He was 70 years old.

== Discography ==
Year	Album	Artist	Credits
1968	Magic Bus	The Who	Executive Producer
1969	Tommy	The Who	Executive Producer
1971	Who's Next	The Who	Producer, Executive Producer
1973	Quadrophenia	The Who	Executive Producer
1975	Tommy (Original Soundtrack)	Various Artists	Executive Producer
1988	This is My Generation	The Who	Executive Producer
1988	Who's Better, Who's Best	The Who	Executive Producer
1988	Who's Better, Who's Best: The Videos	The Who	Director, Re-editing
2001	Who's Next (Bonus tracks)	The Who	Producer, Executive Producer
2003	No Thanks! The 70s Punk Rebellion	Various Artists	Producer
2003	Tommy (Deluxe Edition)	The Who	Executive Producer
2004	Early Collection: Magic Bus/Meaty Beaty Big and Bouncy	The Who	Executive Producer
2004	First Singles Box	The Who	Executive Producer
2004	Quick One (Bonus Tracks)	The Who	Liner Notes
2004	Tommy (DVD)	The Who	Executive Producer

== Filmography ==
Year	Film	Genre	Credits
1964	Of Human Bondage	Drama	Assistant Director
1975	Tommy	Musical Drama	Executive Producer
1979	Quadrophenia	Musical Drama	Story Consultant
1994	Celebration: The Music of Pete Townshend and The Who	Documentary	Producer
2006	An Ox's Tale: The John Entwistle Story	Documentary	As himself
2007	Amazing Journey: The Story of The Who	Documentary	As himself
2014	Lambert & Stamp	Documentary	As himself

== TV appearances ==
- Stamp appeared in the second episode of the BBC documentary series Pop Britannia, which originally aired on Friday, 11 January 2008.
- Stamp appeared in an episode of VH1's Behind the Music series about Keith Moon.
- Stamp appeared in an episode of the BBC documentary series 'Imagine...' entitled 'Jimi Hendrix: Hear My Train a Comin' originally aired in 2013
