= A Quick One =

Studio album by the Who
- Released: 9 December 1966
- Recorded: 30 August – November 1966
- Studios: IBC, Regent and Pye (all London)
- Genre: Rock
- Length: 31:48
- Labels: Reaction (UK); Decca (US)
- Producer: Kit Lambert

The Who UK chronology
Ready Steady Who (1966)	A Quick One (1966)	The Who Sell Out (1967)

The Who US chronology
The Who Sings My Generation (1966)	Happy Jack (1967)	The Who Sell Out (1967)

Singles from A Quick One
- 1. "Happy Jack" Released: 18 March 1967 (US)

A Quick One is the second studio album by the English rock band the Who, released on 9 December 1966. In the United States, where the song "Happy Jack" was a top 40 hit, the album was released in April 1967 under the title Happy Jack with a slightly altered track listing.

Unlike other albums by the Who, on which guitarist Pete Townshend was the primary or sole songwriter, A Quick One features significant songwriting contributions from all band members; lead vocalist Roger Daltrey contributed one song, and bassist John Entwistle and drummer Keith Moon each contributed two. The album also included a cover of the Holland–Dozier–Holland song "Heat Wave" and ends with a musical suite titled "A Quick One, While He's Away", which served as an inspiration for later rock operas for which the Who would become known.

== Background ==
The Who's second studio album departs from the R&B emphasis of their debut, My Generation. Co-manager Chris Stamp had signed a deal with New Action Publishing which advanced £500 to each band member for contributing two songs each to the new album, though Roger Daltrey only wrote one ("See My Way"). The outcome is the Who album least dominated by Pete Townshend's songwriting; Townshend claimed that this push for equal contribution led to the exclusion of the band's recent hit singles he had written, including "I'm a Boy" and "Happy Jack". Because the other members were new to songwriting, Townshend also ended up helping them demo their songs.

== Compositions and recording ==
A Quick One was recorded in the autumn of 1966, in London (at IBC Studios, Pye Studios, and Regent Sound), by record producer Kit Lambert, co-manager of the Who. During one of the early October sessions Chas Chandler brought Jimi Hendrix, newly arrived in London, to meet the group and seek a recommendation for amplifiers. Townshend suggested both Hiwatt and Marshall, only to regret having endorsed such "powerful weapons" to the unknown guitarist whom he had not yet seen play live.

The album's opening track "Run Run Run" had been demoed earlier in the year and first given to a band called the Cat, who released their version in May 1966. Recorded by the Who during the first week of October at IBC, it is a pounding hard rocker with a flashy, feedback-inflected guitar solo that marked an evolution in the group's sound. A longer stereo version from a Track Records sampler was later rediscovered and included on the 1995 expanded CD release.

"Boris the Spider" was written after John Entwistle had been out drinking with the Rolling Stones' bassist Bill Wyman. They were making up funny names for animals when Entwistle came up with the title for a song. The next day in the studio, Townshend asked Entwistle if he had any more material for the album; John mentioned his spider idea as if he'd already written the song, only to go home that night and hurriedly compose the music in less than ten minutes, with its recording taking place on 4 October at Pye Studios. "Boris the Spider" quickly became Entwistle's most popular song, named by Hendrix as his favorite Who number, and was still performed decades later: in later years John often wore a spider necklace, and would have a spider web design inlaid on the body of his custom-made Alembic bass guitar (the latter is pictured on the cover of Entwistle's 1981 solo studio album Too Late the Hero).

Keith Moon's "I Need You" was originally titled "I Need You (Like I Need a Hole in the Head)". Moon thought the Beatles spoke in a secret language behind his back, and this song was his way of getting back at them. Although Moon denied that a vocal part in the song was a John Lennon imitation, Entwistle said that, in fact, it was spoken by the group's Liverpudlian roadie "Lurch" for just that purpose. The line "let us come and sitar with you", complete with a raga-esque answering line, refers to George Harrison's concurrent infatuation with the Indian instrument. The break also features a recreation of a night out at the hip London club Scotch of St. James, with Lambert heard ordering a table for four among other sound effects including clinking glasses. Recorded along with "Boris the Spider" at Pye on 4 October, it is also notable for a prominent harpsichord part played by Entwistle.

John Entwistle would later cite "Whiskey Man" as the first song he ever wrote. It tells the story of a drunkard whose best friend is a man he sees only after drinking heavily. The drunkard is eventually locked in a padded room in a sanitarium, and he laments not being able to share the room with Whiskey Man or even call him. The song was cut at CBS on 3 October, with Entwistle playing french horn in addition to bass. In the first line of the song, Entwistle accidentally sings the word "friend" as "fwend"; not wanting to record an entirely new take, he instead opted to double-track the vocal and sing "flend" as a quick fix.

"Heat Wave", the album's only cover version (and its only nod to the group's soul influences), was originally written by Tamla's Holland–Dozier–Holland team and performed by Martha and the Vandellas. Originally attempted by the Who for their 1965 debut album, it was the first song cut for A Quick One on 31 August 1966 along with the EP tracks "Barbara Ann" and "Batman". It was replaced by "Happy Jack" on the original US release but later included on the 1974 double album repackaging of A Quick One and The Who Sell Out (1967).

"Cobwebs and Strange" was originally called "Showbiz Sonata". Entwistle claimed that the melody came from the 1960 UK television series Man from Interpol (1960). The instrumental was written for this series by Tony Crombie, who released it under its original title "Eastern journey". The track was recorded at Pye sometime prior to 29 September, with each band member playing a wind instrument: Townshend played the penny-whistle, Entwistle the trumpet and French horn, Daltrey the trombone, and Moon the tuba. Townshend remembers the group having great fun marching around a single mono microphone in the studio as it taped. However, this idea did not work and Entwistle recalls the final take was recorded with them standing still.

One of just four Townshend compositions on the album, "Don't Look Away" opened side two and was recorded at CBS on 3 October.

"See My Way", Roger Daltrey's only writing contribution to the album, is a pastiche of Buddy Holly compositions. Townshend helped Roger demo the song at his Soho apartment studio with later overdubs taped at IBC sometime before 29 September. In order to achieve a deadened tom-tom sound like that of Crickets drummer Jerry Allison's distinctive paradiddles on "Peggy Sue", towels were placed on Moon's drum kit. When this resulted in a sound that did not satisfy the band, Moon instead played the tom fills on cardboard boxes.

The mod and power pop number "So Sad About Us", according to AllMusic, is "one of the Who's most covered songs". The Merseys (released in July 1966), Shaun Cassidy, Primal Scream, the Breeders, Daytona, and the Jam have recorded studio versions. The Who's version of the track was recorded at IBC sometime in October.

"A Quick One, While He's Away" is a nine-minute suite of six connected song fragments telling a story of infidelity and reconciliation, the first foray into an extended form that led to the rock operas Tommy (1969) and Quadrophenia (1973). After experimenting with a tentative rock opera named Quads (for which the songs "I'm A Boy" and "Disguises" were written) plus a jokey attempt at the format called "Gratis Amatis", Lambert asked if a more serious attempt could be considered to fill up about ten minutes of needed space on the album. Townshend obliged and the six separate parts of the suite were recorded at IBC, Pye and Regent Sound during the first week of November, the final song completed for the album. The six fragments are titled "Her Man's Gone", "Crying Town", "We Have A Remedy", "Ivor The Engine Driver", "Soon Be Home" and "You Are Forgiven". According to Entwistle, the group wanted to overdub cellos during "You Are Forgiven" but Lambert told them they could not afford it, so they ended up singing "cello cello cello" instead.

Other songs recorded during the sessions included "Barbara Ann", "Batman" and "Bucket T." (all released that November on the Ready Steady Who EP), a cover of the Everly Brothers' "Man With The Money", acoustic and electric versions of "Happy Jack" (with the electric version released a week prior to the album) and its Entwistle B-side "I've Been Away", a medley of "My Generation/Land Of Hope And Glory" used for an all-Who episode of Ready Steady Go!, and a longer alternate version of "I'm A Boy" eventually released on the hits compilation Meaty Beaty Big and Bouncy. All these songs (sans "I'm A Boy") would appear as bonus tracks on the expanded 1995 CD reissue. The original title of the album was Jigsaw Puzzle with an intended track list that included the alternate "I'm A Boy", "Run Run Run", "Don't Look Away", "Circles", "I Need You", "Cobwebs and Strange", "In The City", "Boris The Spider", "Whiskey Man", "See My Way", "Heat Wave" and "Barbara Ann". Townshend also made demos of several other songs considered for the album including "King Rabbit", "Lazy Fat People" and "Join My Gang" but these were scrapped when the idea to involve songs from the other band members was suggested.

== Cover art ==
The cover was designed by the pop art exponent Alan Aldridge, with the front cover depicting the band playing their instruments, as the titles of some songs from the album come out of the instruments: "Cobwebs and Strange" for Moon (top left), "Whiskey Man" for Entwistle (bottom left), "See My Way" for Daltrey (top right), and "A Quick One, While He's Away" for Townshend (bottom right). The back cover of the UK release is black, with the title and track listing across the top, and a colour head-shot photograph of each band member with the letters of "The W H O" superimposed individually over their faces. The back cover of the US release is a black-and-white photo montage of the band members accompanied by a short personality sketch of each. A track listing, a couple of paragraphs touting the band, an advertisement for their debut studio album, and a technical blurb are also crowded onto the back cover of the US release.

== Release ==
A Quick One was released in the UK on 9 December 1966 as Reaction 593 002. It promptly climbed to number 4 on the official Record Retailer chart during a run that lasted 17 weeks, cementing the group's continued success in their home country. In the US it was retitled Happy Jack and released in April 1967 as Decca DL 74892, with the title track taking the place of "Heat Wave". Thanks to the "Happy Jack" single becoming their first top 30 US hit, the album eventually peaked at number 67 on the Billboard album chart that summer.

== Critical reception ==
Professional ratings
Review scores
Source	Rating
AllMusic	4.5/5 stars
The Encyclopedia of Popular Music	3/5 stars
MusicHound Rock	3.5/5
Q	4/5 stars
Rolling Stone	4/5 stars
Tom Hull	B+

The album's release prompted a full-page, track-by-track review by Chris Welch in Melody Maker, where he enthused it was "incredible" and fulfilled the band's promise. He concluded "here is a collection of compositions and treatments that captures the Who essence, humour, cynicism, nervous drive, violence, and delicacy", and praised every track. Retrospectively, Rolling Stone's Steve Appleford said in 1995 that the album's cheerful pop style has an authentic quality with trifles like "Cobwebs and Strange" that are reconciled by "absolutely perfect, poignant pop tune[s]" such as "So Sad About Us". The album was later described as "fascinatingly quirky" by the magazine. Ritchie Unterburger at AllMusic gave the album four-and-a-half stars, noting it was not as impressive as the debut but saw the band "grapple with more complex melodic and lyrical themes", finding praise for "Cobwebs and Strange", "So Sad About Us", and both Entwistle numbers. In Christgau's Record Guide: Rock Albums of the Seventies (1981), Robert Christgau included the album's American version in his "basic record library". Rolling Stone ranked the album number 383 on its list of the 500 greatest albums of all time, published in 2003, and 384 in 2012.

== Track listing ==
=== A Quick One ===
Side one
No.	Title	Writer(s)	Lead vocals	Length
1.	"Run Run Run"	Pete Townshend	Roger Daltrey	2:42^{[a]}
2.	"Boris the Spider"	John Entwistle	John Entwistle	2:28
3.	"I Need You"	Keith Moon	Keith Moon	2:24
4.	"Whiskey Man"	John Entwistle	John Entwistle	2:57
5.	"Heat Wave"	Brian Holland; Lamont Dozier; Edward Holland	Roger Daltrey, with Pete Townshend	1:54
6.	"Cobwebs and Strange"	Keith Moon	instrumental	2:29
Total length:				14:54

Side two
No.	Title	Writer(s)	Lead vocals	Length
1.	"Don't Look Away"	Pete Townshend	Roger Daltrey	2:51
2.	"See My Way"	Roger Daltrey	Roger Daltrey	1:52
3.	"So Sad About Us"	Pete Townshend	Roger Daltrey, with John Entwistle	3:01
4.	"A Quick One, While He's Away"; I. "Her Man's Been Gone" (0:23); II. "Crying Town" (1:37); III. "We Have a Remedy" (1:32); IV. "Ivor the Engine Driver" (1:42); V. "Soon Be Home" (1:26); VI. "You Are Forgiven" (2:30)	Pete Townshend	Roger Daltrey, John Entwistle, Pete Townshend	9:10
Total length:				16:54

^{a} The mono version fades out sooner, giving it a running time of 2:33.

=== Happy Jack ===
Side one
No.	Title	Length
1.	"Run Run Run"	2:44
2.	"Boris the Spider"	2:30
3.	"I Need You"	2:25
4.	"Whiskey Man"	2:57
5.	"Cobwebs and Strange"	2:31
6.	"Happy Jack"	2:11
Total length:		15:18

Side two
No.	Title	Length
1.	"Don't Look Away"	2:53
2.	"See My Way"	1:53
3.	"So Sad About Us"	3:04
4.	"A Quick One, While He's Away"	9:10
Total length:		17:00

- Later US releases from 1974 to 1995 reinstated "Heat Wave" in its original position, while "Happy Jack" was moved to after "A Quick One, While He's Away".

== Personnel ==
The Who

- Roger Daltrey – lead vocals, trombone on "Cobwebs and Strange"
- Pete Townshend – guitar, backing vocals, co-lead vocals on "A Quick One, While He's Away" and "Heat Wave", tin whistle on "Cobwebs and Strange"
- John Entwistle – bass, backing vocals, lead vocals on "Boris the Spider" and "Whiskey Man", co-lead vocals on "A Quick One, While He's Away" and "So Sad About Us", French horn on "Whiskey Man", "Cobwebs and Strange" and "See My Way", trumpet on "Cobwebs and Strange"
- Keith Moon – drums, backing vocals, lead vocals on "I Need You", tuba on "Cobwebs and Strange"

A Quick One personnel

- Chris Stamp – executive producer

1995 credits

- Design (original vinyl sleeve): Alan Aldridge
- Design, art direction: Richard Evans
- Executive producer: Bill Curbishley, Chris Charlesworth, Robert Rosenberg
- Liner notes: Chris Stamp
- Producer: Jon Astley
- Producer (original recording): Kit Lambert
- Remix, remastered by: Andy Macpherson, Jon Astley

== Charts ==
Chart performance for A Quick One
Chart (1966–1967)	Peak position
Australian Kent Music Report Albums Chart	163
Canada RPM Top 25 LPs	13
Norwegian VG-lista Albums Chart	2
Swedish Kvällstoppen Chart	19
UK Disc and Music Echo Top Ten LPs	3
UK Melody Maker Top Ten LPs	4
UK New Musical Express Top 15 LP's	3
UK Record Retailer LPs Chart	4
US Billboard Top LP's	67
US Cash Box Top 100 Albums	35
US Record World 100 Top LP's	27
West German Musikmarkt LP Hit Parade	15

Chart (2026)	Peak position
Greek Albums (IFPI)	51

== See also ==
- Album era
- British Invasion
- British rock
- Pop art
- Swinging London
