= A Quick One, While He's Away =

Song by the Who

from the album A Quick One
- Released: 9 December 1966
- Recorded: Early November 1966
- Studio: IBC, Pye and Regent Sound (London)
- Genre: Rock; pop; proto-prog; power pop; music hall
- Length: 9:10 (album version); 9:41 (Thirty Years of Maximum R&B version)
- Label: Reaction
- Songwriter: Pete Townshend
- Producer: Kit Lambert

"A Quick One, While He's Away" is a song written by Pete Townshend and recorded by the English rock band the Who for their second studio album A Quick One (1966). The song also appears on the album BBC Sessions. In the performance on their Live at Leeds album Townshend calls the nine-minute "epic" track a "mini-opera" and introduces it as "Tommy's parents".

The song tells the story of an unnamed girl whose lover has been gone "for nearly a year". Her friends inform her that they "have a remedy"; the remedy comes in the form of Ivor the Engine Driver. When the lover returns, the girl confesses her infidelity, and she is ultimately forgiven.

== Parts to the song ==
The song has six distinct movements. The brief harmonised a cappella intro is titled "Her Man's Been Gone". The "Crying Town" section is sung by Roger Daltrey in an atypical low register. Daltrey also sings "We Have a Remedy" in his more usual voice. John Entwistle plays "Ivor the Engine Driver" in that section. Then comes "Soon Be Home", another harmonised section. Finally, "You Are Forgiven" is sung by Pete Townshend – his only lead vocal on the album (except, on most versions of the album, a small part of "Heat Wave"). "You Are Forgiven" was originally intended to include cellos, but this was rejected by The Who's producer and manager Kit Lambert for budgetary reasons. Instead, the backing vocals at the beginning of the movement repeat the word "cello".

This song is the Who's first publicised venture into the rock opera genre (although the songs "I'm a Boy" and "Disguises" were the result of Townshend's first delve into rock opera, entitled "Quads"), and a precursor to their later, more ambitious project Tommy. In addition to the studio recording on the A Quick One album, a live recording appears on Live at Leeds. When the song was performed live, instead of "girl", Townshend and Daltrey would make a point to sing "Girl Guide". A performance filmed for The Rolling Stones Rock and Roll Circus in 1968 can be seen on that film (released in 1996) and on the 1979 documentary The Kids Are Alright. It also appears on both films' soundtrack albums. Another version recorded live at the Monterey Pop Festival can be found on the Monterey Pop Festival four-disk set and on another Who film, Thirty Years of Maximum R&B Live. A mixed studio and live version can be found on The Who's four disk set Thirty Years of Maximum R&B.

Another version of this song is available on the DVD, At Kilburn 1977 + Live at the Coliseum, with Townshend's long explanation of the song and constant humorous comments by Keith Moon. However, because of problems with the cameras, part of the performance is lost, and was replaced by stylised footage.

The Live at Leeds version of the song was used in the soundtrack of the movie Rushmore (though the Rock and Roll Circus version, specifically "You Are Forgiven", was used in the film). According to the commentary for the film, the Circus recording is owned as part of the package of Rolling Stones songs, and it was prohibitively expensive to include on the soundtrack album (which is, similarly, missing the Stones' song "I Am Waiting," used in the film).

A short tease of the final section, "You Are Forgiven", was used to end a concert at the Wembley Arena on 16 November 2000. That was the first time any part of the song was played live by The Who since 1970, until it was resumed in its entirety for the 2014 The Who Hits 50! tour. Pete Townshend played the song in its entirety on several dates of his 1993 PSYCHODERELICT solo tour.

The song was rehearsed for inclusion in The Who's 2006/2007 North American Tour, but was not part of any set list.

It is likely that the name of "Ivor the Engine Driver" was influenced by the UK TV series Ivor the Engine.

== Background ==
As Pete Townshend showed producer Kit Lambert the songs he had demoed, one was a mock oratorio called "Gratis Amatis". Going from that, Lambert asked about a "pop opera" played more seriously, possibly inspired in the single "Happy Jack", so that it could fill the remaining space in the upcoming and lead into a quick release. Taking "quickly" as the primary order, Townshend came to the title A Quick One for the album and "A Quick One While He's Away" for a song he started to write inspired by his childhood experiences. Townshend reveals in his 2012 autobiography, Who I Am, that "A Quick One While He's Away" briefly refers to his molestation as a child, but not explicitly. "Ivor The Engine Driver" is said by Townshend to be a metaphor for the possible abuser. The "Her Man's Been Gone" section refers to Townshend's separation from his parents and spending time with his grandmother, Denny. The crying in the "Crying Town" portion is his own, for his parents to pick him up and to leave Denny, who is said by Townshend to have been the person who brought in unknown men into her home. The "little girl" referred to in his song is actually a make-believe "imaginary constant friend" and "twin girl who suffered every privation I suffered." The "You Are Forgiven" presents someone coming to Townshend's rescue: his mother. The lyric about sitting on Ivor the Engine Driver's lap "and later with him had a nap" also hints at what may have happened. The song ends with the verbal chant of "you are forgiven", which Townshend states that when The Who performed the song, he would always get into a frenzy. He states that those who were being forgiven was everyone referred to in the song's lyrics, including himself.

He told Mojo:

The Who were not at their peak exactly, but with "the mini opera", we were just about starting to tap into something that became a complete obsession for me. Which was that when we played a hard-driving rock 'n' roll and brought in this slightly evangelical, hippy, spiritual thing – at the end of our piece, I'm shouting, "You are forgiven, you are forgiven, you are forgiven" – that there would be a kind of spiritual rush in the audience that was obviously there to be tapped into. Rock 'n' roll had always been below the belt stuff, and that was something else.

== Live performance ==
The Who performed the song often after its release, but it was largely retired after 1970. Live versions of the song, such as that heard on the Live at Leeds album, contain some noticeable structural differences from the original. The second half of the "Ivor the Engine Driver" section ("better be nice to an old engine driver") was cut, and "Soon Be Home" was shortened substantially. The "You Are Forgiven" section, on the other hand, was extended, sometimes ending up as nearly half the song. Live, Townshend also frequently gave humorous introductions to the song.

== Reception ==
Although never released as a single, "A Quick One, While He's Away" is widely regarded as one of the band's best songs. In 2012, Brian Tremml of Paste ranked "A Quick One, While He's Away" number seven on his list of the 20 greatest songs by the Who, though a list of the 20 greatest songs by the Who compiled by five Paste writers in 2023 did not include the song. In 2022, Rolling Stone ranked the song number four on their list of the 50 greatest songs by the Who.

== Covers ==
Graham Coxon performed the song in late 2004 at the Queens of Noize Christmas Party.

My Morning Jacket performed a cover of the song at the 2006 Bonnaroo Music Festival and on several European dates during their stint as an opening act for Pearl Jam in the same year, when the latter's frontman Eddie Vedder would join them on stage. One such occasion (19 September 2006, PalaIsozaki, Turin) is documented as a bonus track on the DVD version of the Pearl Jam concert film Immagine in Cornice. My Morning Jacket covered the song again during the encore of night 4 of their 5-day concert series at New York City's Terminal 5 in 2010.

Islands song "In the Rushes" on their 2008 album Arm's Way includes the final section of the song.

Green Day recorded a cover that was included as a bonus track on deluxe editions of their album 21st Century Breakdown. They have also performed all six sections of the song at sound checks. The band performed the song in its entirety at their 28 July 2009 concert at New York City's Madison Square Garden, on 25 April 2010 at New York City's Bowery Electric as their side-project Foxboro Hot Tubs, on 24 August 2013 at the Leeds Festival and on 15 March 2014 at SXSW.

Saint Motel recorded a cover that was included on the 2014 album I Saved Latin! A Tribute to Wes Anderson.
