= We're Not Gonna Take It (The Who song) =

Song by The Who

Single by the Who

from the album Tommy
- A-side: "I'm Free"
- Released: 5 July 1969 (US)
- Genre: Hard rock
- Length: 7:02
- Label: Decca
- Songwriter: Pete Townshend
- Producer: Kit Lambert

The Who US singles chronology
"Pinball Wizard" (1969)	"We're Not Gonna Take It" (1969)	"The Seeker" (1970)

"We're Not Gonna Take It" is the final track on the Who's rock opera Tommy. Written by Pete Townshend, the song also contains the "See Me, Feel Me" anthem that is central to the structure of Tommy.

== Background ==
According to Pete Townshend, "We're Not Gonna Take It" was not originally written for the Tommy storyline. Instead, he says the people's reaction to politics inspired it.

Again something written before Tommy had actually been formed as a total idea, and that particular song wasn't about Tommy's devotees at all. It was about the rabble in general, how we, myself as part of them, were not going to take fascism, were not going to take dreary, dying politics; were not going to take things the way they were, the way they always had been and that we were keen to change things.

— Pete Townshend

In the storyline of Tommy, this song describes Tommy's followers' rejection of Tommy's new religion that bans drinking and drugs and centers around pinball. The song reprises the "See Me, Feel Me" and "Listening to You" themes that were seen previously throughout the album.

They've paid their money and they've walked in the door thinking they're going to get a shortcut to God-realization. [Tommy] starts to make the rules hard. He says 'you can't drink, you can't smoke dope, you can't do this, you can't do that, you've got to play pinball, you've got to do it my way; if you don't do it my way, you're out.' And he starts to get so tough that they rebel. 'We don't want your religion. What we want is a shortcut away from all our problems.' That's what they really want.

— Pete Townshend

The disciples become disillusioned with Tommy; that is often the way with heroes. They feel that the whole idea has become commercialized and begin to question their hero worship.

— Pete Townshend

== Release ==
In addition to being released on the Tommy album, "We're Not Gonna Take It" was released as a single in different forms. In America, it was the B-Side to "I'm Free", another album track. However, in 1970, the "See Me, Feel Me" portion was released as a single, backed with "Overture from Tommy". This version has been included on numerous compilation albums.

== Personnel ==
The Who

- Roger Daltrey – lead vocals in the verse
- Pete Townshend – backing vocals, electric guitar, keyboards
- John Entwistle – lead vocals in the chorus, backing vocals, bass guitar
- Keith Moon – drums
