= Gaumont State Cinema =

Theatre in Kilburn, London, England

Coordinates: 51.54130°N 0.19757°W

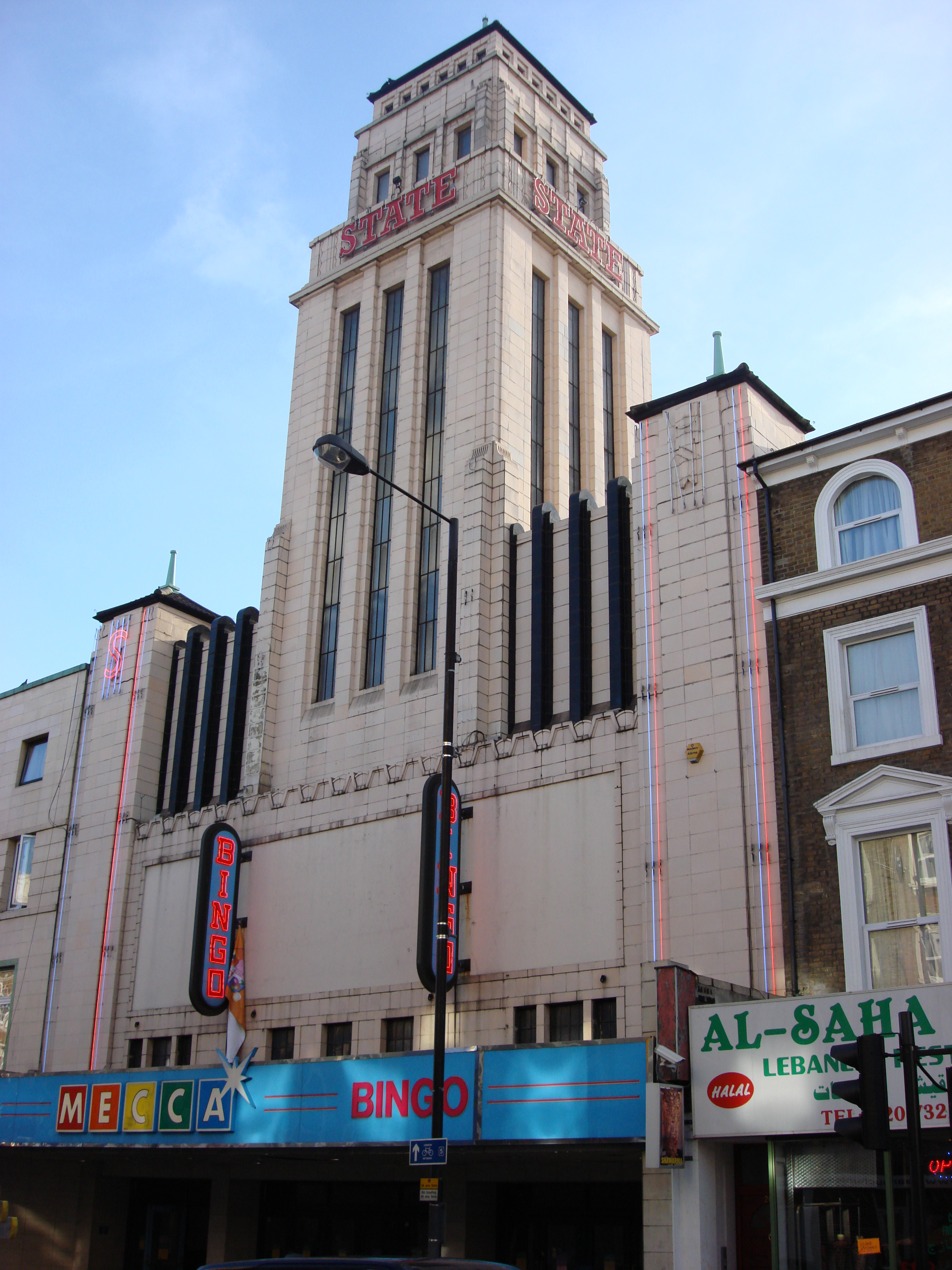
Gaumont State Cinema on Kilburn High Road

Gaumont State Cinema is a Grade II* listed Art Deco theatre located in Kilburn, a district in northwest London.

== Building ==
Designed by George Coles and commissioned and built by Phillip and Sid Hyams, the cinema opened in 1937. The Gaumont State was one of the biggest auditoria in Europe, with seating for 4,004 people. The name State is said to come from the huge 120 feet (37 m) tower, inspired by the Empire State Building in New York City. The exterior of the cinema is designed in an Art Deco Italian Renaissance style, covered in cream ceramic tiles. The tower, designed in the style of a 1930s New York skyscraper, can be seen for miles around, and bears the name "STATE" in large red neon letters. The interior was designed in the opulent style of cinemas of the day, and includes a Wurlitzer organ which is today one of the largest fully functioning Wurlitzer organs in Britain. It is also one of the few cinema organs remaining in their original locations.

== History ==
Entertainers Gracie Fields, Larry Adler and George Formby performed at the official opening broadcast live on BBC Radio on 20 December 1937. Since then, the Gaumont State has been one of the most popular music venues in London and has hosted a number of historic performances. From the late 1980s until 2007 the building was run as a bingo hall by Mecca Bingo. In 2007 the bingo hall was closed, and the building and surrounding site were put up for sale. A campaign to "Save the Kilburn State" from unsympathetic property developers, and restore it as a cultural centre, was started in the same year by local residents. The building was eventually acquired by Ruach City Church, led by Bishop John Anthony Francis and Co-Pastor Penny Francis. The building was bought 70 years to the day after the Gaumont State first opened on 20 December 1937.

== Noteworthy performances ==
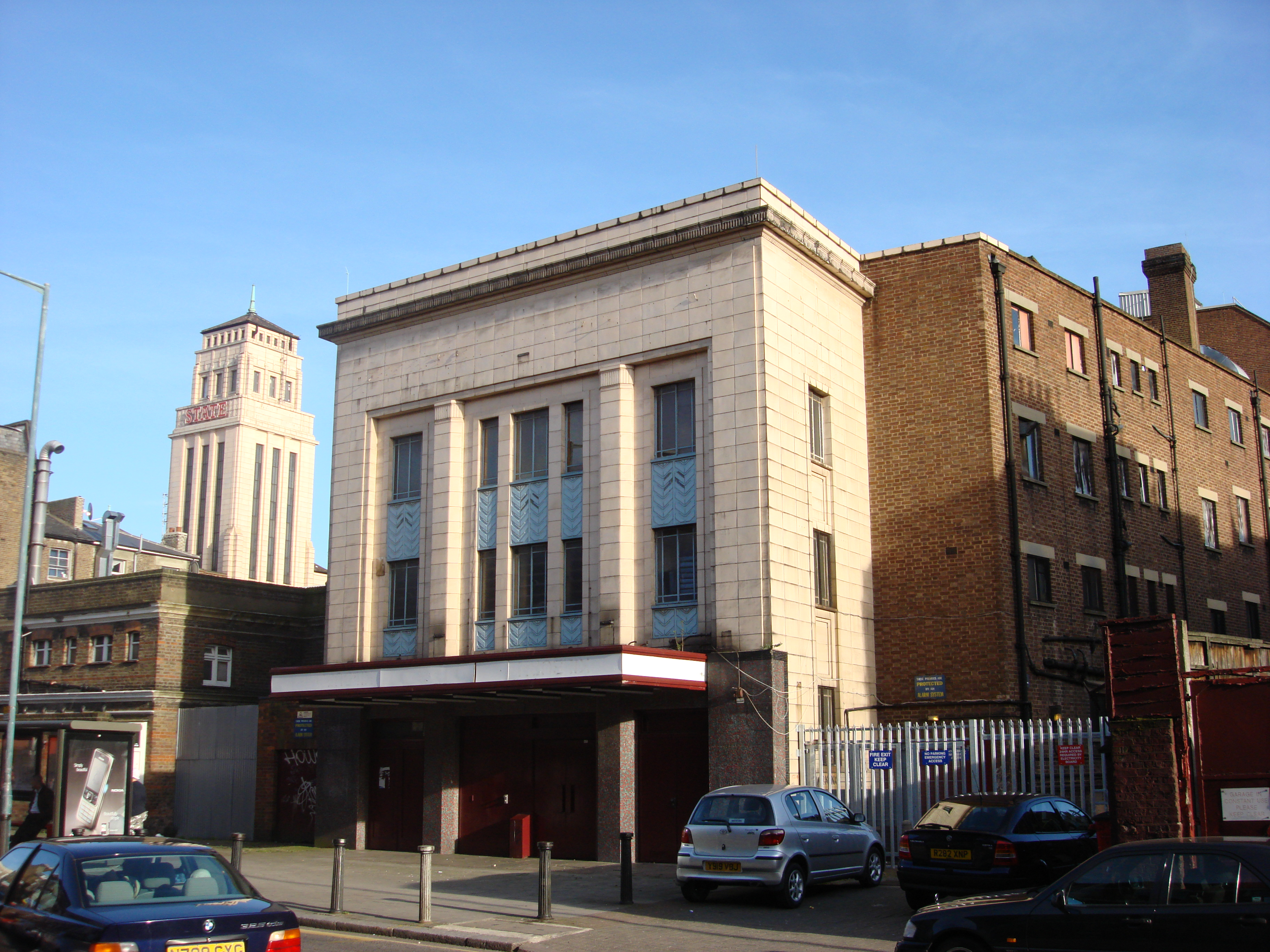
The former 3rd class entrance of Gaumont State Cinema

- Django Reinhardt and Stéphane Grappelli (23 July 1938 & 14 August 1939)
- Dinah Shore (5 September 1948)
- Nellie Lutcher (29 October 1950)
- Deep River Boys (12 November 1950)
- Petula Clark (12 November 1950)
- Frank Sinatra (21 June 1953)
- Lee Konitz (1957)
- Jerry Lee Lewis (25 May 1958)
- Duke Ellington (25 October 1958)
- Buddy Holly (2 March 1958)
- Jazz at the Philharmonic 18 May 1958
- Ella Fitzgerald and the Oscar Peterson Trio (11 April 1965)
- Thelonious Monk (7 May 1961)
- Art Blakey (7 May 1961)
- Lee Morgan (7 May 1961)
- Dizzy Gillespie (11 November 1961)
- John Coltrane (11 November 1961)
- Dave Brubeck (1963)
- The Beatles (9 April 1963 & 23 October 1964)
- The Rolling Stones (19 November 1963)
- Jethro Tull (26–28 February 1971)
- David Bowie (13 June 1973)
- Ronnie Wood and Keith Richards (14 July 1974)
- The Faces (13–14 July 1974 & 21–22 December 1974)
- Deep Purple (22 May 1974)
- Black Sabbath (21 November 1975)
- The Who (15 December 1977)
- Bill Haley & His Comets
- Count Basie
- Harry Belafonte
- Louis Armstrong
- Sarah Vaughan
- Tom Jones
- Doreen Chadwick

== See also ==
- The Who at Kilburn: 1977
- The First Barbarians: Live from Kilburn
- Deep Purple Live in London
