= The Kids Are Alright (1979 film) =

1979 rockumentary

- Directed by: Jeff Stein
- Produced by: Tony Klinger; Bill Curbishley
- Starring: Roger Daltrey; Pete Townshend; John Entwistle; Keith Moon
- Cinematography: Anthony B. Richmond
- Edited by: Ed Rothkowitz
- Music by: The Who
- Distributed by: New World Pictures
- Release dates: 14 May 1979 (Cannes Film Festival); 15 June 1979
- Running time: 109 minutes
- Country: United Kingdom
- Language: English
- Budget: $2 million
- Box office: $1.5 million

The Kids Are Alright is a 1979 rockumentary film about the English rock band the Who, including live performances, promotional films and interviews from 1964 to 1978. It notably featured the band's last performance with long-term drummer Keith Moon, filmed at Shepperton Studios in May 1978, four months before his death.

== Production ==
The film was primarily the work of American fan Jeff Stein who, despite having no previous experience in filmmaking, convinced the band to support the project and served as the film's director. Stein had produced a book of photographs from the band's 1971 tour when he was just 17. In 1975, he approached Pete Townshend, the Who's principal composer and lead guitarist, about compiling a collection of film clips to provide a historical reference for the band's fans. Townshend initially rejected the idea, but was persuaded by the group's manager, Bill Curbishley, to give their cooperation. Townshend was also encouraged at Stein's suggestion that the film could "do the touring" for the band, at a time when the guitarist was having doubts regarding life on the road.

When Stein and his film editor, Ed Rothkowitz, previewed a 17-minute compilation of clips from their US television appearances to the band and their wives, they could hardly believe the reaction. "Townshend was on the floor, banging his head. He and Moon were hysterical. Daltrey's wife was laughing so hard she knocked over the coffee table in the screening room. Their reaction was unbelievable. They loved it. That's when they were really convinced that the movie was worth doing."

Stein knew that many of the band's best performances and most memorable moments had either never been recorded or been lost, erased or discarded. For more than two years, he collected film, television and fan film footage in Britain, the United States, Sweden, Germany, France, Australia, Norway and Finland, in some cases actually rescuing footage from the trash. Nevertheless, there were gaps in the depiction of the band's catalog and persona that required the shooting of new material. This began on 20 July 1977 at Shepperton Studios in Middlesex, England, with a lighthearted rehearsal of old songs, including the Beach Boys song "Barbara Ann" at Stein's request. The film crew then spent five days chronicling the daily life of drummer Keith Moon at his Malibu, California, home, including his 31st birthday party. Finally, Stein attempted on several occasions to record performances of songs that were not covered by the archival footage, particularly "Baba O'Riley" and "Won't Get Fooled Again". A special one-off show at the Kilburn State Theatre in December 1977, staged for the film, was considered too rough to use, so a second show, in front of an invited audience, took place at Shepperton Studios on 25 May 1978. Both songs were performed to a much better level, and were included in the film. "My Wife" from the Kilburn show was included on the soundtrack album but not on screen.

The sound editing was supervised by bassist John Entwistle, and, with the exception of a 1965 performance of "Anyway, Anyhow, Anywhere" where Entwistle had to replace a missing bass track and the footage of Moon smashing a drum kit—as the original 8mm footage was silent, Moon overdubbed drum sounds—most of the sound was authentic. Entwistle did fight for—and won—getting him and Pete to overdub their backing vocals on the Woodstock footage, because Entwistle deemed the original gig's backup vocals "dire". During the process of sound editing, on 7 September 1978, Keith Moon died. All of the band members except Townshend had seen a rough cut of the film just a week before, and, after Moon's death, they were determined not to change anything.

The film premiered at the Cannes Film Festival on 14 May 1979. The Who promoted the release of the film with some live performances with their new drummer, former Small Faces and Faces drummer Kenney Jones.

A soundtrack album was released in June 1979, including some songs and performances from the film. The album reached No. 26 in the UK, and fared better in the US, where it peaked at No. 8 on the Billboard album charts and went Platinum.

== Contents ==
With the collection of material that he included, Stein attempted to create not a linear, chronological documentary but "a celluloid rock 'n' roll revival meeting" and "a hair-raising rollercoaster ride" that was worthy of the band's reputation. The performances which comprise the body of the film are organized around a number of playful encounters by the band members with various variety and talk show hosts, Pete Townshend's playful relationship with his fans, admirers and critics, and the endless antics of Keith Moon.

=== Television shows and interviews ===
The film starts with a bang -- literally -- with the band's only US variety show appearance. On September 15, 1967 the Who tapes their guest spot on the CBS show The Smothers Brothers Comedy Hour in Los Angeles following the end of their first US tour. Airing two days later, they mime to their soon-to-be-released single "I Can See For Miles" and engage host Tommy Smothers in some witty repartee before lip-syncing to a newly-recorded backing track of "My Generation".

As the song concludes with flash pot explosions, feedback and manic drumming, Pete attacks his amp with the neck of his guitar, then takes the instrument and wallops the floor, and finally tosses it away. Keith then sets off an explosive charge hidden in his bass drum -- along with a smaller one placed earlier by the show's staff -- which shocks the audience, singes Townshend's hair and temporarily deafens his right ear, and propels cymbal shrapnel into Moon's arm. As stunned co-host Tommy returns to the stage holding his own acoustic guitar, Townshend takes it from him and smashes it up as well.

Clips of a 1973 interview from London Weekend Television's Russell Harty Plus appear six times throughout the film. While Harty delves into the background of the members' lives, Moon again steals the show as he rips off Townshend's shirt sleeve and then promptly strips down to his underwear.

One of the TV interviews included in the film features Ken Russell, the director of the film Tommy, who makes his mark with an exaggerated plea: "I think that Townshend, the Who, Roger Daltrey, Entwistle, Moon could rise this country out of its decadent ambient state better than Wilson or all of those crappy people could ever hope to achieve!"

An early performance from ABC Television's Shindig! and one of only two surviving tapes from the group's many appearances on the British program Ready Steady Go!, both recorded in 1965, are included along with numerous interview clips from BBC Radio, as well as mostly black & white interviews, stage, and blue-screen performances (such as of Tommy, Can You Hear Me?) on the music programme Beat-Club, recorded at the Radio Bremen studios in Germany. Segments filmed in each of the band member's homes include several conversations between Moon and good friend, drummer Ringo Starr.

=== Large concerts ===
Performances from three of the band's largest concert appearances bear witness to the band's progression from the British mod scene to global superstardom:

- Their reluctant gig at the Woodstock Festival on 17 August 1969 was not an artistic success in the eyes of the band, but it helped Tommy become a critical blockbuster. Warner Bros. allowed Jeff Stein to look through their 400,000 feet of film from the three-day festival. Stein then reconstructed a "new" cut of the Who's song highlights (as opposed to the "split-screen" images from the original Woodstock film). He chose three songs: "Sparks", "Pinball Wizard", and "See Me, Feel Me". He also added a snippet of "My Generation" when Townshend smashed his guitar following a brief excerpt of "Naked Eye".
- The group's 1975 US tour reached its peak before a crowd of 75,962 at the Pontiac Silverdome on 6 December. The images in the film were broadcast to large screens in the stadium so those in the far reaches could actually see the band members on stage. From this appears the "Roadrunner/My Generation Blues" medley. However, the soundtrack includes "Join Together", which precedes "Roadrunner".
- While it appears near the end of the film, the band's appearance at the Monterey Pop Festival on 18 June 1967 brought about their first big media exposure in the United States. In the film, the Who's Monterey Pop appearance cuts away to footage from past concerts depicting the band destroying their equipment before returning to the destructive end of "My Generation". This performance does not appear on the soundtrack.

=== Discarded footage ===
At least three chapters in the film resurrect performances that were discarded or thought to be lost:

- When the English National Opera allowed the band to play in the London Coliseum on 14 December 1969, the show was recorded for later release. The poor quality of the footage, however, made it expendable to the group and Stein retrieved the footage from a trash dump. The band's rendition of "Young Man Blues" is included in the film. The concert footage was later released in its entirety on disc two of The Who at Kilburn: 1977 DVD set.
- A promotional film for the song "Happy Jack" was shot on 19 December 1966 for a BBC Television series called Sound and Picture City but the show was never aired.
- The Rolling Stones Rock and Roll Circus was to be a television special featuring a variety of rock bands and circus performers, but after the filming, the Rolling Stones felt their own performance was substandard and the project was shelved. The film includes a rousing performance of the group's first "rock opera" – "A Quick One While He's Away" – shot on 11 December 1968. Originally, the clip's picture was cropped and bordered by flashing lights to compensate for the film's copy (and that version used different camera angles at times). After the Stones' former label, ABKCO, released Rock and Roll Circus on DVD, Stein extracted the Who's performance from the DVD and inserted it back in.

=== Moon's final performances ===
The film incidentally became a sort of time capsule for the band, since Keith Moon died only one week after he had seen the rough cut of the film with Roger Daltrey. Moon, according to Daltrey, was deeply shocked by how much he had changed physically in just 15 years, "from a young good-looking boy to a spitting image of Robert Newton". After Moon's death, the rough cut did not suffer a single change, since neither Stein nor the rest of the band wanted to turn the film into an homage to Moon, but to celebrate his life and career with the Who.

Moon's last performances with the band were:

- The clip for "Who Are You", his last studio performance. Stein wanted to show the Who recording in the studio, even though the band had already finished recording the song. Stein planned to have the band mime over the original recording, but the Who played it live at the Ramport Studios, London, on 9 May 1978. The only playback tracks were Entwistle's bass guitar, the acoustic guitar solo in the middle, the backing vocals and synthesizer track.
- The show at Shepperton Studios, London, on 25 May 1978, his last live performance.

=== Song list ===
The song list below is taken from the Universal Music DVD booklet.

- "My Generation" (lip-sync) – The Smothers Brothers Comedy Hour, 15 September 1967
- "I Can't Explain" (live) – Shindig!, Twickenham Film Studios, 3 August 1965
- "Baba O'Riley" (live in the studio) – Shepperton Film Studios, London, 25 May 1978
- "Shout and Shimmy" (live) – Fifth National Jazz and Blues Festival, Surrey, 6 August 1965
- "Young Man Blues" (live) – London Coliseum, 14 December 1969
- "Tommy Can You Hear Me" (lip-sync) – Beat-Club, Radio Bremen Studios, Hamburg, Germany, 26 or 28 August 1969
- "Pinball Wizard" (live) – Woodstock festival, New York, 17 August 1969
- "See Me, Feel Me/Listening To You" (live) – Woodstock festival, New York, 17 August 1969
- "My Generation" conclusion plus the beginning of "Naked Eye" (live) – Woodstock festival, New York, 17 August 1969
- "Anyway, Anyhow, Anywhere" (live) – Ready Steady Go!, 1 July 1965
- "Success Story" (studio version) – John's home, Gloucestershire, 5–6 January 1978
- "Substitute" (lip-sync) – Promotional video, Covent Garden, London, 21 March 1966
- "Pictures of Lily" (lip-sync) – Beat-Club, Fernsehstudio, Osterholz, Germany, 19 April 1967
- "Magic Bus" (lip-sync) – Beat-Club, Radio Bremen Studios, Bremen, Germany, 7 October 1968
- "Happy Jack" (studio version) – Promotional film, Caroline House, Mayfair, London, 19 December 1966
- "A Quick One, While He's Away" (live) – The Rolling Stones Rock and Roll Circus film, Stonebridge Park Studios, Wembley, London, 10 December 1968
- "Cobwebs and Strange" (studio version) – Promotional video for "Call Me Lightning", Hollywood, California, 27 February 1968
- "Sparks" (live) – Woodstock festival, New York, 17 August 1969
- "Barbara Ann" (live in the studio) – Shepperton Film Studios, Middlesex, 21 July 1977
- "Roadrunner/My Generation Blues" (live) – Pontiac Silverdome, Pontiac, Michigan, 6 December 1975
- "Who Are You" (live in the studio) – Promotional video, Rampart Studios, Battersea, London, 9 May 1978
- "My Generation" including instrument smashing from other performances (live) – Monterey Pop Festival, Monterey, 18 June 1967
- "Won't Get Fooled Again" (live) – Shepperton Film Studios, London, 25 May 1978
- "Long Live Rock" (studio version) – closing credits with Who farewells from various performances
- "The Kids Are Alright" (studio version) – closing credits

== DVD edition ==
For many years the film was released on VHS in an edited 90-minute form, extracted from a TV broadcast copy made in the 1980s, which itself was a program of the RCA SelectaVision CED version, a format popular in the late 70s, early 80s. Several scenes were removed and the audio had several pitch problems and dropouts, due to different film stocks and original film regions.

In 2003, a DVD edition of the film was released in an expanded package with booklet and slipcase designed by Richard Evans. The film had been transferred from the restored 35mm interpositive and the audio was extensively restored. In addition to the original film, with English subtitles, on-screen liner notes, commentary with Jeff Stein and DVD producer John Albarian, and a 28-page booklet, the DVD contained a bonus disc with over three hours of additional materials:

- "See My Way": Q&A with director Jeff Stein
- "Behind Blue Eyes": Q&A with Roger Daltrey
- "Miracle Cure": Documentary on the restoration of The Kids Are Alright
- "Getting in Tune": Audio comparison (old vs new)
- "Trick of the Light": Video comparison (old vs new)
- "The Who's London": A tour of Who locations in London
- "The Ox": Isolated tracks of John Entwistle for "Baba O'Riley" and "Won't Get Fooled Again"
- "Anytime You Want Me": Multi-angle feature for "Baba O'Riley" and "Won't Get Fooled Again"
- "Pure and Easy": Trivia game. The prize: A rare radio trailer of Ringo Starr promoting The Kids Are Alright
- "It's Hard": Trivia game. The prize: A slide show to the "Who Are You" 5.1 studio mix

The DVD was released by Pioneer Home Entertainment. The digitally-restored version of the film was premiered at the New York Film Festival in October 2003 with Daltrey, Lewis, Stein and Albarian in attendance.
