= Happy Jack (song) =

Single by the Who

from the album Happy Jack (US version of A Quick One)
- B-side: "I've Been Away" (UK); "Whiskey Man" (US)
- Released: 2 December 1966 (UK); 18 March 1967 (US)
- Recorded: 10 November 1966
- Studio: CBS Studios, London
- Genre: Rock
- Length: 2:14
- Label: Reaction (UK); Decca (US); Polydor (EU)
- Songwriter: Pete Townshend
- Producer: Kit Lambert

The Who singles chronology
"La-La-La-Lies" (1965)	"Happy Jack" (1966)	"Pictures of Lily" (1967)

Official audio
- "Happy Jack" on YouTube

"Happy Jack" is a song by the English rock band the Who. Written by guitarist Pete Townshend, it was released as a single in December 1966 in the United Kingdom, peaking at No. 3 in the charts. It peaked at No. 1 in Canada. It was also their first top 40 hit in the United States, where it was released in March 1967 and peaked at No. 24. It was included on the American version of their second album, Happy Jack, originally titled A Quick One in the UK.

The song features Roger Daltrey sharing lead vocals with John Entwistle and Pete Townshend. At the tail end of "Happy Jack", Townshend can be heard shouting "I saw you!"; it is said that he had noticed drummer Keith Moon trying to join in surreptitiously to add his voice to the recording, something the rest of the band would try to prevent (Moon had a habit of making the other members laugh). Rolling Stone critic Dave Marsh calls this line "the hippest thing" about the song.

In the song, Happy Jack "lived in the sand at the Isle of Man". According to some sources, Townshend reported the song is about a man who slept on the beach near where Townshend vacationed as a child. Children on the beach would laugh at the man and once buried him in the sand. However, the man never seemed to mind and only smiled in response. According to Marsh, "the lyric is basically a fairy tale, not surprisingly, given the links to Pete's childhood".

Greg Littmann interprets the song as a possible reaction to alienation, as Jack allows "the cruelty of other people [to] slide off his back".

Despite its chart success, Who biographer Greg Atkins describes the song as being the band's weakest single to that point. Daltrey reportedly thought the song sounded like a "German oompah song". But Chris Charlesworth praised the "high harmonies, quirky subject matter" and "fat bass and drums that suspend belief". Charlesworth particularly praised Moon's drumming for carrying not just the beat, but also the melody itself, in what he calls "startlingly original fashion". Marsh states that although the song contained little that the band had not done before, it did "what the band did well", giving the "soaring harmonies, enormously fat bass notes, thunderous drumming" and the guitar riffs as examples.

According to Pete Townshend's autobiography, "Happy Jack" is Paul McCartney’s favourite Who song.

== Live performances ==
The song was first performed by the Who in 1967 and continued to be played until 1970; a performance from the Who's February 1970 concert at Leeds may be heard in a medley with other songs on the 1995 CD reissue of Live at Leeds and subsequent reissues. It was also performed in Townshend's first solo concert in 1974. The most recent performances of the song were short (one-and-a-half-minute) versions at the Shepherd's Bush Empire, London, on 22 and 23 December 1999.

A snippet of the song was played at a 1982 concert in Indianapolis to appease a fan who was holding a sign saying, "Play Happy Jack, It's My Birthday!", which was blocking the vision of several fans behind him. However, Townshend stated that he and the band couldn't remember how to play the full song anymore.

== Charts ==
Chart (1966–1967)	Peak position
Austria (Ö3 Austria Top 40)	7
Belgium (Ultratop 50 Flanders)	12
Belgium (Ultratop 50 Wallonia)	14
Canada (RPM)	1
Italy (Musica e dischi)	36
Netherlands (Dutch Top 40)	5
New Zealand (Listener)	6
Norway (VG-lista)	4
UK Singles (OCC)	3
US Billboard Hot 100	24
West Germany (Media Control)	4

== Cover versions ==
American rock band Southern Culture on the Skids covered "Happy Jack" on their 2007 album Countrypolitan Favorites. The song was used as the soundtrack to a Hummer TV commercial in 2005.
