= Overture (The Who song) =

Single by the Who

from the album Tommy
- A-side: "See Me, Feel Me"
- Released: 10 October 1970
- Genre: Rock
- Length: 3:50 (album); 4:01 (single)
- Label: Track
- Songwriter: Pete Townshend
- Producer: Kit Lambert

The Who singles chronology
"Summertime Blues" (1970)	"Overture" (1970)	"Won't Get Fooled Again" (1971)

"Overture" is a song by the English rock band the Who, written by Pete Townshend. The track is one of three instrumentals on Tommy, the other two being "Underture" and "Sparks".

On 9 October 1970, the song was included as the B-side of "See Me, Feel Me" – which did not chart – and was titled "Overture from Tommy".

== Song structure ==
As an overture the song features samples of Tommy's themes:

- 0:00 – 0:16 Adapted from "1921"
- 0:17 – 0:32 Adapted from "See Me, Feel Me"
- 0:33 - 0:36 Adapted from “The Hawker”
- 0:36 – 0:58 Adapted from "We're Not Gonna Take It"
- 0:59 – 1:33 Adapted from "Go to the Mirror!"
- 1:34 – 1:55 Adapted from "See Me, Feel Me"
- 1:56 – 2:18 Adapted from "Go to the Mirror!"
- 2:19 – 2:55 Adapted from "Listening to You"
- 2:56 - 3:03 Adapted from “Go to the Mirror!”
- 3:04 – 3:19 Adapted from "We're Not Gonna Take It"
- 3:20 – 3:50 Adapted from "Pinball Wizard”

There is no pause between the tracks "Overture" and "It's a Boy", so the songs are often combined as "Overture".

== Personnel ==
- Pete Townshend – acoustic guitar, electric guitar, piano, Hammond organ, lead vocals
- John Entwistle – bass guitar, French horn
- Keith Moon – drums, percussion

== The Assembled Multitude version ==
The Assembled Multitude, an instrumental ensemble group from Philadelphia, Pennsylvania, scored with a remake of "Overture" which peaked at No. 16 in August 1970 on the Billboard Hot 100 chart.
