= I'm Free (The Who song) =

Single by the Who

from the album Tommy
- B-side: "We're Not Gonna Take It" (US) "Tommy Can Your Hear Me?" (Europe)
- Released: 5 July 1969 (US)
- Genre: Hard rock; power pop
- Length: 2:39
- Label: Decca (US); Polydor (Europe)
- Songwriter: Pete Townshend
- Producer: Kit Lambert

The Who US singles chronology
"Pinball Wizard" (1969)	"I'm Free" (1969)	"The Seeker" (1970)

"I'm Free" is a song written by Pete Townshend and performed by the Who on the album Tommy. The song has since been released as a single, becoming one of the best known tracks from Tommy.

== Background ==
Pete Townshend has claimed that the song was partly inspired by the song "Street Fighting Man" by the Rolling Stones.

'I'm Free' came from 'Street Fighting Man.' This has a weird time/shape and when I finally discovered how it went, I thought 'well blimey, it can't be that simple,' but it was and it was a gas and I wanted to do it myself.

— Pete Townshend

On "I'm Free," drummer Keith Moon only played on the breaks of the song. According to bassist John Entwistle, Moon was unable to perform the intro the way Townshend wanted, resulting in Townshend and Entwistle having to perform part of the drums. Townshend and Entwistle had to signal Moon to play the song during live performances by taking very large steps.

On 'I'm Free', me and Pete had to play the drums and Keith played the breaks because he couldn't get the intro. He was hearing it differently from how we were, and he couldn't shake it off. So we put down the snare, the hi-hat and the tambourine part and he came in and added all the breaks. When we did it live, the only way to bring him in was for Pete and I to go like this [makes an exaggerated step], which must have looked completely nuts.

— John Entwistle

Within the plot of the album, "I'm Free" tells of Tommy's vision to spiritually enlighten others due to his sudden and immense popularity. The "Pinball Wizard" riff (earlier on the album) appears at the end of the song during the "How can we follow?" part. Townshend has since noted "I'm Free" and "Pinball Wizard" as "songs of the quiet explosion of divinity. They just rolled off the pen."

"I'm Free" was later released as a single in most of Europe (backed with "Tommy, Can You Hear Me?") as well as America (where it was backed with "We're Not Gonna Take It"). The single reached number 37 in the US on the Billboard Hot 100. It also reached number 20 in the Netherlands, and number 26 in Canada. Billboard described the single as an "easy beat rocker" with "much sales potency" that represented a "change of pace" from the Who's previous single "Pinball Wizard." Cash Box said that "the Who come on strongly" and that the song has a "striking out-of-context lyric which should spark immediate activity."

== Film and film soundtrack versions ==
The versions of "I’m Free" recorded for the 1975 film and its soundtrack album feature the Who accompanied by Nicky Hopkins on piano and Kenney Jones playing drums.

== Live history ==
This song was used in the 1969–1970 concert classic set list. It is often switched with "Sensation" on setlists, including in the movie and in the Broadway musical as Tommy rejoices at regaining his sight, voice and hearing after the shock provided by his mother.

In 1975–1976, the song was reintegrated into the Who's set list. The version played at these shows featured more raucous vocals and a reworked guitar riff.

In 2002, the Who played this for a stretch on their 2002 UK Tour, with a similar arrangement to the versions played on the 1975–1976 tour. However, it was dropped again by the time bassist Entwistle died.

== Charts ==
Chart (1969–1970)	Peak position
Belgium (Ultratop 50 Wallonia)	40
Canada (RPM)	26
Netherlands (Dutch Top 40)	20
US Billboard Hot 100	37
West Germany (Media Control)	18

== Covers and other uses ==
- In 1973, a single version sung by Roger Daltrey from the London Symphony Orchestra reached #13 in Britain.
- In 1988, WIYY-FM disc jockey Bob Rivers played the song to commemorate the Baltimore Orioles getting their first victory 9-0 over the Chicago White Sox after a record-setting streak of losing their first 21 games of the season, during the last ten days of which saw Rivers do a publicity stunt where he vowed to stay on the air non-stop until the Orioles won their first game, taking naps only between songs.
- In 1997, the Christian rock band Geoff Moore and the Distance covered this song, on the album Threads.
- In 2004, a cover version (combined with the instrumental "Sparks") was recorded by Neal Morse with the participation of Randy George and Mike Portnoy, it was originally released as the last track on the special edition of Neal's One album. It was re-released on the 2006 album Cover to Cover.
- In 2009, The Smithereens included the song on their tribute album, The Smithereens Play Tommy.
- The song was used in commercials for Saab in the mid-2000s.

== Personnel ==
The Who

- Roger Daltrey – lead vocals
- Pete Townshend – backing vocals, electric guitar, acoustic guitar, keyboards, drums
- John Entwistle – backing vocals, bass guitar, drums
- Keith Moon – drums
