= Tommy (The Who album) =

Studio album by the Who
- Released: 19 May 1969
- Recorded: 19 September 1968 – 7 March 1969
- Studios: IBC and Morgan, London
- Genres: Hard rock; art rock
- Length: 74:44
- Labels: Track (UK); Decca (US)
- Producer: Kit Lambert

The Who UK chronology
Direct Hits (1968)	Tommy (1969)	Live at Leeds (1970)

The Who US chronology
Magic Bus: The Who On Tour (1968)	Tommy (1969)	Live at Leeds (1970)

Singles from Tommy
- 1. "Pinball Wizard" Released: 7 March 1969; 2. "I'm Free" / "We're Not Gonna Take It" Released: July 1969; 3. "See Me, Feel Me" / "Overture from Tommy" Released: September 1970

Tommy is the fourth studio album by the English rock band the Who, released on 19 May 1969. Written primarily by guitarist Pete Townshend, Tommy is a double album and an early rock opera that tells the story of the fictional Tommy Walker and his path to becoming a spiritual leader and messianic figure.

Townshend came up with the concept of Tommy after being introduced to the work of Indian spiritual teacher Meher Baba, and he attempted to translate Baba's ideas into music. Recording of the album began in September 1968, but took six months to complete as material needed to be arranged and re-recorded in the studio. The Who promoted the album's release with an extensive tour, including a live version of Tommy, which lasted throughout 1969 and 1970. Key gigs from the tour included appearances at Woodstock, the 1969 Isle of Wight Festival, the University of Leeds, the Metropolitan Opera House, and the 1970 Isle of Wight Festival. The live performances of Tommy drew critical praise and revitalised the band's career.

Upon its release, Tommy was acclaimed by critics, who hailed it as the Who's breakthrough. Several writers view it as an important and influential album in the history of rock music. In 1998, Tommy was inducted into the Grammy Hall of Fame.

Subsequently, the rock opera was developed into other media, including a ballet in Montreal in 1970, a Seattle Opera production in 1971, an orchestral version by Lou Reizner in 1972, a film directed by Ken Russell and featuring Jack Nicholson and Oliver Reed in 1975, and a Broadway musical in 1992.

Tommy has been reissued several times on CD, including a remix by Jon Astley in 1996, a deluxe Super Audio CD in 2003, and a super deluxe box set in 2013, including previously unreleased demos and live material.

== Synopsis and plot ==
Tommy tells the story of a fictional character named Tommy Walker. The following synopsis of Tommy was published following the original album's release.

British Army Captain Walker goes missing during an expedition and is believed dead ("Overture"). His wife, Mrs. Walker, gives birth to their son, Tommy ("It's a Boy"). Years later, Captain Walker returns home and discovers that his wife has found a new lover. The Captain kills the lover in front of Tommy. Tommy's parents coerce him into believing he did not see or hear anything. Tommy begins to disassociate and becomes deaf, dumb and blind to the outside world ("1921"). Tommy now relies on his sense of touch and imagination, developing an inner psyche ("Amazing Journey/Sparks").

A hawker claims his wife can cure Tommy ("Eyesight to the Blind"). Tommy's parents are increasingly frustrated that he will never find religion in the midst of his isolation ("Christmas"). Tommy's parents neglect him, leaving him to be tortured by his sadistic "Cousin Kevin" and sexually abused by his uncle Ernie ("Fiddle About"). The Hawker's drug-addicted wife, "The Acid Queen", gives Tommy a dose of LSD, causing a psychedelic experience that is expressed musically ("Underture").

As Tommy grows older, he discovers that he can feel vibrations sufficiently well to become an expert pinball player ("Pinball Wizard"). His parents take him to a respected doctor ("There's a Doctor"), who determines that the boy's disabilities are psychosomatic rather than physical. Tommy is told by the Doctor to "Go to the Mirror!", and his parents notice he can stare at his reflection. After seeing Tommy spend extended periods staring at a mirror in the house, his mother smashes it out of frustration ("Smash the Mirror"). This removes Tommy's mental block, and he recovers his senses, realising he can become a powerful leader ("Sensation"). He starts a religious movement ("I'm Free"), which generates fervour among its adherents ("Sally Simpson") and expands into a holiday camp ("Welcome" / "Tommy's Holiday Camp"). However, Tommy's followers ultimately reject his teachings and leave the camp ("We're Not Gonna Take It"). Tommy retreats inward again ("See Me, Feel Me") with his "continuing statement of wonder at that which encompasses him".

== Background ==
Townshend had been looking at ways of progressing beyond the standard three-minute pop single format since 1966. Co-manager Kit Lambert shared Townshend's views and encouraged him to develop musical ideas, conceiving the term "rock opera". The first use of the term was applied to a suite called Quads, set in a future where parents could choose the sex of their children. A couple want four girls but instead receive three girls and a boy, raising him as a girl anyway. The opera was abandoned after writing a single song, the hit single, "I'm a Boy". When the Who's second album, A Quick One, ran short of material during recording, Lambert suggested that Townshend should write a "mini-opera" to fill the gap. Townshend initially objected, but eventually agreed to do so, coming up with "A Quick One, While He's Away", which joined short pieces of music together into a continuous narrative. During 1967, Townshend learned how to play the piano and began writing songs on it, taking his work more seriously. That year's The Who Sell Out included a mini-opera in the last track, "Rael", which like "A Quick One ..." was a suite of musical segments joined together.

The package I hope is going to be called "Deaf, Dumb and Blind Boy." It's a story about a kid that's born deaf, dumb and blind and what happens to him throughout his life ... But what it's really all about is the fact that ... he's seeing things basically as vibrations which we translate as music. That's really what we want to do: create this feeling that when you listen to the music you can actually become aware of the boy, and aware of what he is all about, because we are creating him as we play."

— Pete Townshend talking to Jann Wenner, August 1968

By 1968, Townshend was unsure about how the Who should progress musically. The group were no longer teenagers, but he wanted their music to remain relevant. His friend, International Times art director Mike McInnerney, told him about the Indian spiritual mentor Meher Baba, and Townshend became fascinated with Baba's values of compassion, love and introspection. The Who's commercial success was on the wane after the single "Dogs" failed to make the top 20, and there was a genuine risk of the band breaking up. The group still performed well live and spent most of the spring and summer touring the US and Canada, but their stage act relied on Townshend smashing his guitar or Keith Moon demolishing his drums, which kept the group in debt. Townshend and Kit Lambert realised they needed a larger vehicle for their music than hit singles and a new stage show, and Townshend hoped to incorporate his love of Meher Baba into this concept. He decided that the Who should record a series of songs that stood well in isolation but formed a cohesive whole on the album. He also wanted the material performed in concert, to counter the trend of bands like the Beatles and the Beach Boys producing studio output that was not designed for live performance.

In August 1968, in an interview to Rolling Stone, Townshend talked about a new rock opera and described the entire plot in great detail, which ran to 11 pages. The Who biographer Dave Marsh subsequently said the interview described the narrative better than the finished album. Townshend later regretted publishing so much detail, as he felt it forced him to write the album according to that blueprint. The rest of the Who, however, were enthusiastic about the idea, and let him have artistic control over the project.

== Recording and production ==
The Who started recording the album at IBC Studios on 19 September 1968. There was no firm title at this point, which was variously referred to as Deaf, Dumb and Blind Boy, Amazing Journey, Journey into Space, The Brain Opera and Omnibus. Townshend eventually settled on Tommy because it was a common British name and a nickname for soldiers in the First World War. Kit Lambert took charge of the production, with Damon Lyon-Shaw as engineer. Sessions were block-booked from 2 pm – 10 pm, but recording often spilled over into the early morning.

The album was recorded using an eight-track system, which allowed various instruments to be overdubbed. Townshend used several guitars in the studio but made particular use of the Gibson J-200 acoustic and the Gibson SG. As well as their usual instruments, Townshend played piano and organ and bassist John Entwistle doubled on french horn. Keith Moon used a new double bass drum kit owned by roadie Tony Haslam, after Premier had refused to loan him any more equipment due to the items repeatedly being abused. Though Townshend wrote the majority of the material, the arrangements came from the entire band. Singer Roger Daltrey later said that Townshend often came in with a half-finished demo recording, adding "we probably did as much talking as we did recording, sorting out arrangements and things." Townshend asked Entwistle to write two songs ("Cousin Kevin" and "Fiddle About") that covered the darker themes of bullying and abuse. "Tommy's Holiday Camp" was Keith Moon's suggestion of what kind of religious movement Tommy could lead. Moon got the songwriting credit for suggesting the idea, though the music was composed and played by Townshend. A significant amount of material had a lighter style than earlier recordings, with greater prominence put on the vocals. Moon later said, "It was, at the time, very un-Wholike. A lot of the songs were soft. We never played like that."

Some of the material had already been written for other projects. "Sensation" was written about a girl Townshend had met on the Who's tour of Australia in early 1968, "Welcome" and "I'm Free" were about peace found through Meher Baba and "Sally Simpson" was based on a gig with the Doors which was marred by violence. Other songs had been previously recorded by the Who and were recycled; "It's A Boy" was derived from "Glow Girl", an out-take from The Who Sell Out, while "Sparks" and "Underture" re-used and expanded one of the instrumental themes in "Rael". "Amazing Journey" was, according to Townshend, "the absolute beginning" of the opera and summarised the entire plot. "The Hawker" was a cover of Sonny Boy Williamson's "Eyesight to the Blind". A cover of Mercy Dee Walton's "One Room Country Shack" was also recorded but was scrapped from the final track listing as Townshend could not figure out a way to incorporate it in the plot.

Recording at IBC was slow, due to a lack of a full plot and a full selection of songs. The group hoped that the album would be ready by Christmas 1968, but sessions dragged on. Melody Maker's Chris Welch visited IBC studios in November and while he was impressed with the working environment and the material, the project still did not have a title and there was no coherent plotline. The Who's US record company, Decca Records, got so impatient waiting for new product that they released the compilation album Magic Bus: The Who on Tour which received a scathing review from Greil Marcus in Rolling Stone over its poor selection of material and misleading name (as the album contained studio recordings and was not live).

The Who took a break from recording at the end of 1968 to tour, including a well received appearance at The Rolling Stones Rock and Roll Circus on 10 December. They resumed sessions at IBC in January 1969, block booking Monday to Thursday, but had to do gigs every weekend to stop going further into debt. A major tour was booked for the end of April, and the group's management insisted that the album would have to be finished by then, as it had been well over a year since The Who Sell Out. Kit Lambert wrote a script, Tommy (1914–1984), which he professionally printed and gave copies to the band, helping them focus on the storyline and also deciding to make the album a double. The group were still coming up with new material; Lambert insisted that the piece should have a proper overture, while Townshend wrote "Pinball Wizard" so that Nik Cohn, a pinball fan, would give the album a favourable review in The New York Times. Lambert wanted an orchestra to appear on the album, but Townshend was strongly against the idea, and time and budget constraints meant it could not happen anyway.

By March 1969, some songs had been recorded several times, yet Townshend still thought there were missing pieces. Entwistle had become fed up with recording, later saying "we had to keep going back and rejuvenating the numbers ... it just started to drive us mad." The final recording session took place on 7 March, the same day that "Pinball Wizard" was released as a single. The group started tour rehearsals and promotional activities for the single and Lambert went on holiday in Cairo. The mixing was left to Damon Lyon-Shaw and assistant engineer Ted Sharp, who did not think IBC was well suited for the task. The album overshot its April deadline, as stereo mastering continued into the end of the month.

== Release and commercial performance ==
After delays surrounding the cover artwork, Tommy was released on 19 May 1969 in the US by Decca and 23 May in the UK by Track Records. The original double album was configured with sides 1 and 4 on one disc, and sides 2 and 3 on the other, to accommodate record changers.

The album was commercially successful, reaching No. 2 in the UK album charts. It peaked at No. 7 in the US in 1969, but in 1970 it re-entered the charts, at which time it went on to peak at No. 4. It sold 200,000 copies in the first two weeks in the US alone and was awarded a gold record for sales of 500,000 on 18 August. "Pinball Wizard", "I'm Free" and "See Me, Feel Me" were released as singles and received airplay on the radio. "Pinball Wizard" reached the top 20 in the US and the top five in the UK. "See Me, Feel Me" reached the top 20 in the US and "I'm Free" reached the top 40. An EP of selections from the album was planned to be released in the UK in November 1970 but was withdrawn.

== Critical reception ==
=== Contemporary reviews ===
When it was released, critics were split between those who thought the album was a masterpiece, the beginnings of a new genre, and those that felt it was exploitative. The album had a hostile reception with the BBC and certain US radio stations, with Tony Blackburn describing "Pinball Wizard" as "distasteful". Nevertheless, BBC Radio 1 received an advance copy of the album at the start of May and gave the material its first airplay on Pete Drummond's show on 3 May. Townshend promoted the album's release with interviews in which he attempted to explain the plotline. Unfortunately, because it fundamentally dealt with the abstract concept of Meher Baba's spiritual precepts, the interviews often gave confusing and contradictory details.

For Melody Maker, Chris Welch went to the album's press launch show at Ronnie Scott's and although the volume left his ears ringing for 20 hours, he concluded "we wanted more." Disc and Music Echo ran a front-page headline saying "Who's Tommy: A Masterpiece". Critics and fans were confused by the storyline, but Kit Lambert pointed out this made Tommy no less confusing than the operas of Richard Wagner or Giacomo Puccini a century earlier. In a 1969 column for The Village Voice, music critic Robert Christgau said that, apart from the Mothers of Invention's We're Only in It for the Money, Tommy is the first successful "extended work" in rock music, but Townshend's parodic side is more "profound and equivocal" than Frank Zappa. He praised Townshend for deliberately constructing the album so that each song can be enjoyed individually and felt that he is determined to "give his audience what it wants without burying his own peculiarity". Albert Goldman, writing in Life magazine, said that the Who play through "all the kinky complications" of the narrative in a hard rock style that is the antithesis of most contemporary "serious" rock. Goldman asserted that, based on innovation, performance, and "sheer power", Tommy surpasses anything else in studio-recorded rock. Robert Christgau named Tommy the best album of 1969 in his year-end list for Jazz & Pop magazine.

=== Retrospective reappraisal and legacy ===
Retrospective professional reviews
Review scores
Source	Rating
AllMusic	4.5/5 stars
Encyclopedia of Popular Music	4/5 stars
MusicHound Rock	4/5
Q	4/5 stars
Robert Christgau	A−
Rolling Stone	4/5 stars
The Rolling Stone Album Guide	4/5 stars
Tom Hull – on the Web	A−
Uncut	3/5 stars

According to music journalist Richie Unterberger, Tommy was hailed by contemporary critics as the Who's breakthrough. Robert Christgau wrote in 1983, "Tommy's operatic pretensions were so transparent that for years it seemed safe to guess that Townshend's musical ideas would never catch up with his lyrics." In his review for AllMusic, Unterberger said that, despite its slight flaws, the album has "many excellent songs" permeated with "a suitably powerful grace", while Townshend's ability to devise a lengthy narrative introduced "new possibilities to rock music". Uncut wrote that the album "doesn't quite realise its ambitions, though it achieves a lot on the way", and felt it was not as well developed as their later album, Quadrophenia. Mark Kemp, writing in The Rolling Stone Album Guide (2004), felt that "in retrospect, Tommy isn't quite the masterpiece it was originally hyped to be", suggesting The Who Sell Out was better, though because of Townshend, it produced several "bona fide classic songs". "Rock opera may seem like a laughable concept these days, but when the Who brought it to the world via Tommy in 1969, it was an unmatched thrill", writes Mac Randall of Rolling Stone in 2004 in a more positive appraisal. "Almost thirty-five years later, this classic-rock touchstone still has the power to enthrall."

In 1998, the album was inducted into the Grammy Hall of Fame for "historical, artistic and significant value". In 2000 it was voted number 52 in Colin Larkin's All Time Top 1000 Albums. In 2003, Rolling Stone magazine ranked Tommy number 96 on its list of the 500 greatest albums of all time, it maintained the rating in a 2012 revised list, and was re-ranked at number 190 on the 2020 list. The album is one of several by the Who to appear in 1001 Albums You Must Hear Before You Die.

According to music critic Martha Bayles, Tommy did not mix rock with classical music, as its "rock opera" title may have suggested, but instead was "dominated by the Who's mature style: ponderous, rhythmically monotonous hard rock". Bayles argued that it was more acceptable to audiences than the art rock "concoctions" of the time because of the cultural climate during the late 1960s: "Tommy was considered more authentic, precisely because it consists of hard rock, rather than doctored-up Mussorgsky ... and avoids the typical pseudoromantic themes of art rock (fairy-tale bliss and apocalyptic angst) in favor of the more up-to-date subject of popular culture itself." High Fidelity magazine also characterised the Who's album as a "reasonably hard-rock version" of the opera.

Dave Marsh thought the problem with the album's narrative is that there is not enough transitional material provided by the lyrics. There are no stage directions, no cast, and narration is restricted to key phrases (such as "Tommy can you hear me?") Key problems included an unclear explanation of what Tommy did not hear or see in "1921", how or why he plays pinball, why "Smash the Mirror" leads into "I overwhelm as I approach you" (the opening line in "Sensation"), why Tommy tells his followers in "We're Not Gonna Take It" they cannot drink or smoke but can play pinball, and what the "you" is in "Listening to you, I get the music".

In 2013, Townshend and Daltrey participated in a documentary about the making of the album Tommy. The documentary is titled Sensation: The Story of the Who's Tommy and features in-depth interviews with them.

== Cover art ==
Tommy was originally released as a two-LP set with artwork designed by Mike McInnerney, which included a booklet including lyrics and images to illustrate parts of the story. Townshend asked McInnerney to do the cover artwork for Tommy in September 1968. Townshend had originally considered Alan Aldridge for the cover. The cover is presented as part of a triptych-style fold-out cover, and the booklet contained stylized artwork that outlined the story. Although the album included lyrics to all the songs, indicating individual characters, it did not outline the plot, which led to a concert programme being prepared for shows, that carried a detailed synopsis.

Townshend thought Mike McInnerney, a fellow follower of Meher Baba, would be a suitable choice to do the cover. As recording was near completion, McInnerney received a number of cassettes with completed songs and a brief outline for the story, which he immediately recognised as being based on Baba's teachings. He wanted to try and convey the world of a deaf, dumb and blind boy and decided to "depict a kind of breaking out of a certain restricted plane into freedom". The finished cover contained a blue and white web of clouds, a fist punching into the black void to the left of it.

The inner triptych, meanwhile, showed a hand reaching out to light and a light shining in a dark void. Townshend was too busy finishing the recording to properly approve the artwork, but Kit Lambert strongly approved of it and said it would work. The final step was for record company approval from Polydor, making one concession that pictures of the band should appear on the cover. These were added to the globe on the front. These pictures were later removed on the 1996 CD remastered reissue.

Tommy was first released on CD in 1984 as a two-disc set. Mobile Fidelity Sound Lab subsequently released a special single-disc edition of the album in 1990, featuring an alternate take of "Eyesight to the Blind" and a low volume extensive break on the glass in "Smash the Mirror". It was also remastered by Erick Labson for single disc release in 1993. Polydor and MCA released a newly remastered version on single disc in 1996, which had been remixed by Jon Astley. Astley was able to access the original 8-track tapes and bring out instruments that had been buried, such as the guitar in "Christmas", the French horn in "Sparks", the cymbals in "The Acid Queen" and the organ in "We're Not Gonna Take It". This release came with Mike McInnerney's complete artwork and a written introduction by Richard Barnes. For this edition, the cover was revised to remove the Who's faces, which were originally placed at the request of the record label.

In 2003 Tommy was made available as a deluxe two-disc hybrid Super Audio CD with a 5.1 multi-channel mix. The remastering was done under the supervision of Townshend and also includes related material not on the original album, including "Dogs-Part 2" (the B-side to "Pinball Wizard"), "Cousin Kevin Model Child" and "Young Man Blues", plus demos for the album and other unreleased songs that were dropped from the final running order. Rolling Stone considered the disc sonically "murkier" than the 1996 CD and was critical of the absence of the original libretto. In 2013, a super deluxe version of Tommy was released as a 3-CD / Blu-ray box set. As well as the original album, the package includes additional demos and a live performance mostly taken from the Who's show at the Capitol Theatre, Ottawa, Ontario, Canada on 15 October 1969. The live disc was significant, as it debunked a long-standing myth that the tapes for the tour were burned in preference for the Leeds University show in February 1970 that made up Live at Leeds.

== Tommy tour ==
The Who had planned to perform Tommy live since starting the project. The group spent April 1969 rehearsing a live version of the show at the Hanwell Community Centre in Ealing including a final run down of the entire stage piece on 23 April. The running order was changed, and four songs ("Cousin Kevin", "Underture", "Sensation" and "Welcome") were dropped entirely. Townshend later said the group "did the whole thing from start to finish and that was when we first realized we had something cohesive and playable." Roger Daltrey's singing had improved substantially since the group's early tours, and they realised their new live act could completely change their career.

After a few warm up gigs towards the end of April, the group gave a preview concert to the press at Ronnie Scott's Jazz Club, London on 1 May. Realising the opera's narrative was difficult to understand, Townshend explained a synopsis of the story, before the Who played Tommy all the way through at full stage volume. The next day, the group flew out to New York to start the US tour, with the first gig on 9 May at the Grande Ballroom, Detroit. At the end of May, the group played four nights at the Kinetic Playground, Chicago, and they noticed the audience would all stand up at the same time and stay standing. This indicated that live performances of Tommy had a significant positive response.

The group continued to play large halls in the US, organised by tour promoter Frank Barsalona, and generally avoided festivals, but made an important exception with the Woodstock festival on 16 August. After spending all night arguing with Barsalona, the band agreed to perform at Woodstock for $12,500. The festival ran late and the Who did not take to the stage until the early morning of 17 August. During "Pinball Wizard", Abbie Hoffman took to the stage to protest about the imprisonment of John Sinclair before being kicked offstage by Townshend, while during "See Me, Feel Me", the sun rose, almost as if on cue. Two weeks later, the group played the second Isle of Wight Festival, using one of the largest live PAs available. Though media attention was on Bob Dylan playing his first major live concert since 1966, the Who stole the show. Townshend later said, "We know that the stage act we had, with Tommy in it, would work under any circumstances, because it had worked many times on tour."

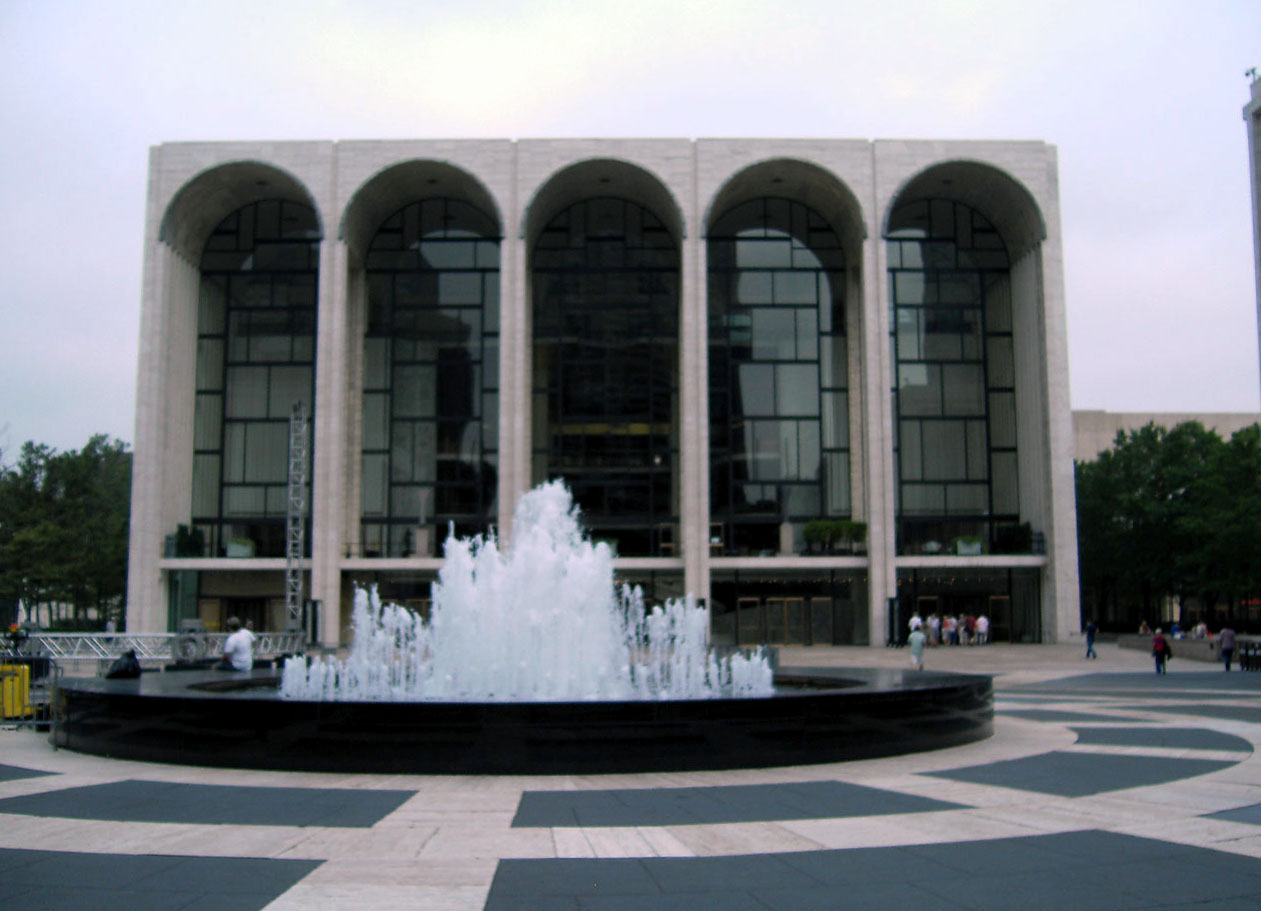
By 1970, Tommy had achieved sufficient critical acclaim to be performed live in the Metropolitan Opera House.

Tommy remained in the Who's live set through the rest of the year and into 1970. In October 1969, the Who played six shows at the Fillmore East, where Leonard Bernstein praised them for their new music. The group's show on 14 December at the London Coliseum was filmed for a possible future Tommy feature. Lambert was keen for Tommy to be taken seriously and wanted the Who to perform at opera houses. In June 1970, the group performed two shows at the Metropolitan Opera House, which was the first time Townshend announced the show as being the "last Tommy ever". The group made a second trip to the Isle of Wight, appearing at the 1970 festival on 29 August, before an audience of 600,000. The last live performance for 1970 was at The Roundhouse, London on 20 December. Townshend said "This is the very last time we'll play Tommy on stage", to which Keith Moon promptly cried, "Thank Christ for that!"

Public reaction to the Who's concerts that included Tommy was overwhelmingly positive. The touring helped keep the album in the public eye and cleared the band's debts. Several live recordings of Tommy from the Who's 1969–70 tours have been released. A complete performance is available on the 2002 Deluxe Edition of the live album Live at Leeds, recorded on 14 February 1970. The second Isle of Wight performance is available on Live at the Isle of Wight Festival 1970, released in 1996. The Coliseum Theatre gig is available on the 2007 video release At Kilburn 1977 + Live at the Coliseum. Portions of the Woodstock performance of Tommy were released on the documentaries Woodstock and The Kids Are Alright.

The Who continued to play a smaller selection of Tommy live in subsequent tours throughout the 1970s. They revived Tommy as a whole for its twentieth anniversary during their 1989 reunion tour, reinstating the previously overlooked "Cousin Kevin" and "Sensation" but still omitting "Underture" and "Welcome". Recordings from this tour can be found on the Join Together live album and the Tommy and Quadrophenia Live DVD. The Los Angeles version of this show featured Phil Collins as Uncle Ernie, Patti LaBelle as the Acid Queen, Steve Winwood as the Hawker, Elton John as the Pinball Wizard, and Billy Idol as Cousin Kevin.

== Other incarnations ==
=== 1970 ballet performance ===
In 1970 Fernand Nault, choreographer of the Montreal ballet group Les Grands Ballets Canadiens, created the first dance-based adaptation of Tommy. The ballet was premiered in Montreal in October 1970 and obtained a real success. The performance toured New York in April 1971, which included a light show and accompanying films by the Quebec Film Bureau.

=== 1971 opera ===
In 1971, the Seattle Opera under director Richard Pearlman produced the first ever fully staged professional production of Tommy at Seattle's Moore Theatre. The production included Bette Midler playing the role of the Acid Queen and Mrs. Walker, and music by the Syracuse, New York band Comstock, Ltd.

=== Orchestral performances ===
On 9 December 1972, entrepreneur Lou Reizner presented a concert version of Tommy at the Rainbow Theatre, London. There were two performances that took place on the same evening. The concerts featured the Who, plus a guest cast, backed by the London Symphony Orchestra conducted by David Measham. The concerts were held to promote the release of Reizner's new studio recording of this symphonic version of Tommy, released in October 1972.

The album and concerts featured an all-star cast, including Graham Bell (as the Lover), Maggie Bell (as the Mother), Sandy Denny (as the Nurse), Steve Winwood (as the Father), Rod Stewart (as the Local Lad), Richie Havens (as the Hawker), Merry Clayton (as the Acid Queen). Ringo Starr, who was on the album, was replaced by Keith Moon for the 9 December 1973 performance (as Uncle Ernie). Townshend played some guitar, but otherwise the music was predominantly orchestral. Richard Harris played the role of the Doctor on the record, but he was replaced by Peter Sellers for the stage production. The stage show had a second run on 13 and 14 December 1973 with Daltrey, Graham Bell, Havens, and Clayton returning, and a new cast including David Essex (as the Narrator), Elkie Brooks (as the Mother), Roger Chapman (as the Father), Marsha Hunt (as the Nurse), Bill Oddie (as Cousin Kevin), Vivian Stanshall (as Uncle Ernie), Roy Wood (as the Local Lad), and Jon Pertwee (as the Doctor).

The orchestral version was also performed twice in Australia on 31 March 1973 at Melbourne's Myer Music Bowl and on 1 April at Sydney's Randwick Racecourse. Keith Moon appeared as Uncle Ernie (in Melbourne only), Graham Bell as the Narrator, with local stars Daryl Braithwaite (as Tommy), Billy Thorpe (as the Local Lad), Doug Parkinson (as the Hawker), Wendy Saddington (as the Nurse), Jim Keays (as the Lover), Broderick Smith (as the Father), Colleen Hewett (as the Mother), Linda George (as the Acid Queen), Ross Wilson (as Cousin Kevin), Bobby Bright (as the Doctor), and Ian Meldrum (as Uncle Ernie in Sydney), and a full orchestra. The Melbourne concert was videotaped, then televised by Channel 7 on 13 April 1973.

In 2018, Daltrey toured the US performing the full version of Tommy, with members of the Who band and an orchestra conducted by Keith Levenson. To mark the 50th anniversary of the release of the original album, a recording of the live concert was released on 14 June 2019. This live album was performed in Bethel, New York, at the site of the original Woodstock festival, and a new orchestral backing recorded by Levenson in Hungary, with the Budapest Scoring Orchestra.

=== 1975 film ===
In 1975 Tommy was adapted as a film, produced by expatriate Australian entrepreneur Robert Stigwood and directed by British auteur Ken Russell. The movie version starred Roger Daltrey as Tommy and featured the other members of the Who, plus a supporting cast that included Ann-Margret as Tommy's mother and Oliver Reed as the Lover, with appearances by Elton John, Tina Turner, Eric Clapton, Arthur Brown, and Jack Nicholson. Russell insisted on having a known cast, though Townshend wanted people who could sing the material, and he was particularly disappointed at not being allowed to cast Stevie Wonder as the Pinball Wizard. In several cinemas, the film supported a multi-track soundtrack billed as quintaphonic sound, which placed speaker banks in the four quadrants of the house and directly behind the centre of the screen.

Townshend also oversaw the production of a soundtrack album, on which the unrecorded orchestral arrangements Kit Lambert had envisaged for the original Tommy LP were realised by the extensive use of synthesizer. He started work on the soundtrack album immediately after the Who's 1973 US tour in December and worked on it almost continuously for the next four months. As well as the Who, the film's music track and the original soundtrack LP also employed several session musicians including Caleb Quaye, Ronnie Wood, Nicky Hopkins, Chris Stainton, and longtime Who associate John "Rabbit" Bundrick. Due to Keith Moon's commitments with the filming of Stardust, Kenney Jones (who would take over as the Who's drummer after Moon's death in 1978) played drums on much of the soundtrack album.

"Pinball Wizard" was a major hit when released as a single. This sequence in the film depicts Elton John being backed by the Who (dressed in pound-note suits); the band portrayed the Pinball Wizard's band for filming, but on the music track and soundtrack album, the music was performed entirely by him and his regular touring band. Most of the extras were students at Portsmouth Polytechnic and were paid with tickets to a Who concert after filming wrapped.

The film and its soundtrack album featured six new songs, all written by Townshend, and an alteration to the running order compared to the original album. The CD reissue of the film soundtrack also included an additional Overture.

=== 1991 stage adaptation ===
In 1991, Townshend broke his wrist in a cycling accident and could not play guitar. Looking for alternative work while recuperating, he responded to a request from the PACE Theatrical Group for the rights to a stage musical adaptation of Tommy. The group introduced him to La Jolla Playhouse director Des McAnuff, and the pair began to develop the musical together. It opened at La Jolla in summer 1992 and was an immediate commercial success. Townshend wrote a new song, "I Believe My Own Eyes", to explain the relationship between Tommy's parents, but otherwise tried to be faithful to the music on the original album.

The musical had a mixed response from critics, while Roger Daltrey and John Entwistle thought the show was too passive. Anthony DeCurtis, writing in Rolling Stone, said the orchestra drummer had "the thankless task of having to reproduce Keith Moon's parts". Townshend and Des McAnuff rewrote parts of the musical when it moved from La Jolla to Broadway, to show a darker side for the title character. McAnuff won a Tony Award in 1993 for Best Director, while Wayne Cilento won the award for Best Choreography. The Broadway run lasted from 1993 to 1995. McAnuff revisited Tommy during the 2013 season of the Stratford Shakespeare Festival, and with Townshend's input, staged a 2023 revival at the Goodman Theatre in Chicago, Illinois, which transferred to Broadway in 2024.

== Track listing ==
Track names and timings vary across editions; some editions have two tracks merged into one and vice versa. "See Me, Feel Me", for example, is the second half of "We're Not Gonna Take It", but is its own track as a single and on the 2003 deluxe edition.

All tracks are written by Pete Townshend, except where noted.

Side one
No.	Title	Writer(s)	Lead vocals	Length
1.	"Overture"		Townshend	5:20
2.	"It's a Boy"		Townshend	0:39
3.	"1921"		Townshend, with John Entwistle and Roger Daltrey on chorus	2:49
4.	"Amazing Journey"		Daltrey	5:04
5.	"Sparks"		instrumental	2:05
6.	"Eyesight to the Blind (The Hawker)"	Sonny Boy Williamson II	Daltrey	2:14
Total length:				18:09

Side two
No.	Title	Writer(s)	Lead vocals	Length
1.	"Christmas"		Daltrey, Townshend on bridge	4:34
2.	"Cousin Kevin"	John Entwistle	Townshend and Entwistle	4:06
3.	"The Acid Queen"		Townshend	3:34
4.	"Underture"		instrumental	10:04
Total length:				22:18

Side three
No.	Title	Writer(s)	Lead vocals	Length
1.	"Do You Think It's Alright?"		Townshend and Daltrey	0:24
2.	"Fiddle About"	Entwistle	Entwistle with Daltrey	1:31
3.	"Pinball Wizard"		Daltrey, Townshend on bridge	3:00
4.	"There's a Doctor"		Townshend, with Entwistle and Daltrey	0:23
5.	"Go to the Mirror!"		Daltrey, Townshend on bridge	3:47
6.	"Tommy Can You Hear Me?"		Townshend, Entwistle, and Daltrey	1:35
7.	"Smash the Mirror"		Daltrey	1:34
8.	"Sensation"		Townshend	2:27
Total length:				14:41

Side four
No.	Title	Writer(s)	Lead vocals	Length
1.	"Miracle Cure"		Townshend, Entwistle, and Daltrey	0:12
2.	"Sally Simpson"		Daltrey	4:10
3.	"I'm Free"		Daltrey	2:39
4.	"Welcome"		Daltrey, Townshend on bridge, Entwistle on spoken word	4:32
5.	"Tommy's Holiday Camp"	Keith Moon (Note: The song is credited to Moon on the album because he came up with the "holiday camp" idea, but the song was actually written and solely performed by Townshend.)	Townshend	0:57
6.	"We're Not Gonna Take It"		Daltrey, with Townshend and Entwistle	7:06
Total length:				19:36

== Personnel ==
=== The Who ===
- Roger Daltrey – vocals, harmonica
- Pete Townshend – vocals, acoustic guitar, electric guitar, keyboards, banjo
- John Entwistle – bass guitar, French horn, trumpet, flugelhorn, vocals
- Keith Moon – drums, timpani, gong, tambourine, vocals

=== Additional personnel ===
- Kit Lambert – producer
- Damon Lyon-Shaw – chief engineer
- Mike McInnerney – cover design
- Barrie Meller – photos

== Charts ==
=== Weekly charts ===
1969 chart performance
Chart (1969–70)	Peak position
Australian Albums (Kent Music Report)	8
Canada Top Albums/CDs (RPM)	6
Dutch Albums (Album Top 100)	5
UK Albums (Official Charts)	2
US Billboard 200	4

=== Yearly charts ===
1976 chart performance
Chart (1976)	Peak position
German Albums (Offizielle Top 100)	50

2002 chart performance
Chart (2002)	Peak position
French Albums (SNEP)	143

2013 chart performance
Chart (2013)	Peak position
Belgian Albums (Ultratop Flanders)	181
Belgian Albums (Ultratop Wallonia)	175

== Certifications ==
Certifications
Region	Certification	Certified units/sales
France (SNEP)	Gold	100,000^{*}
Italy (FIMI)	Gold	25,000^{*}
New Zealand (RMNZ)	Gold	7,500^{^}
United Kingdom (BPI) release of 2012	Gold	100,000^{^}
United States (RIAA)	2× Platinum	2,000,000^{^}
^{*} Sales figures based on certification alone.^{^} Shipments figures based on certification alone.

== Bibliography ==
- Atkins, John (2000). The Who on Record: A Critical History, 1963–1998. McFarland. ISBN 978-0-7864-0609-8.
- Graff, Gary; Durchholz, Daniel, eds. (1999). MusicHound Rock: The Essential Album Guide. Farmington Hills, Michigan: Visible Ink Press. ISBN 1-57859-061-2.
- Marsh, Dave (1983). Before I Get Old: The Story of The Who. Plexus. ISBN 978-0-85965-083-0.
- Neill, Andy; Kent, Matt (2002). Anywhere Anyhow Anywhere: The Complete Chronicle of The Who. Virgin Books. ISBN 978-0-7535-1217-3.
- Kemp, Mark (2004). Brackett, Nathan; Hoard, Christian (eds.). The New Rolling Stone Album Guide (4th ed.). Simon & Schuster. ISBN 978-0-7432-0169-8.
- Wollman, Elizabeth (2006). The Theater Will Rock: A History of the Rock Musical, from Hair to Hedwig. University of Michigan Press. ISBN 978-0-472-11576-1.
- Barnes, Richard and Townshend, Pete (1977). The Story of Tommy. Eel Pie Publishing. pp. 128.
- Cawthorne, Nigel (2005). The Who and the making of Tommy. Unanimous Ltd (Vinyl Frontier 5). pp. 224. ISBN 1-903318-76-9
- Draper, Jason (2008). A Brief History of Album Covers. London: Flame Tree Publishing. pp. 70–71. ISBN 9781847862112. OCLC 227198538.
- Townshend, Pete (1993). Tommy : The Musical. Pantheon. 173 pp. + a CD w/ the song I Can't Believe My Own Eyes. ISBN 0-679-43066-0. Also titled The Who's Tommy: The Musical.
- Townshend, Pete (1996). Tommy : The Interactive Adventure Then and Now. Eel Pie Publishing. Kardana & Interplay Productions. Cdrom for PC (CD-MCR-263-0 / CD-C95-263-0) or for Mac (CD-MCD −263-UK)
- Charlesworth, Chris and McInnerney, Mike, (foreword) Townshend, Pete (2019). Tommy at 50: The Mood, the Music, the Look, and the Legacy of The Who’s Legendary Rock Opera. Apollo Publishers. 178 pp. ISBN 978-194806-240-4
