= See Me, Feel Me =

Single by the Who

from the album Tommy
- B-side: "Overture From Tommy"
- Released: September 1970 (US)
- Recorded: 1969
- Genre: Art rock
- Length: 3:22
- Label: Decca
- Songwriter: Pete Townshend
- Producer: Kit Lambert

The Who singles chronology
"Summertime Blues" (1970)	"See Me, Feel Me" (1970)	"Won't Get Fooled Again" (1971)

"See Me, Feel Me" (aka "Listening to You/See Me, Feel Me" and "See Me, Feel Me/Listening to You") is a song from English rock band the Who's fourth studio album Tommy (1969). It consists of two overture parts from Tommy, the second and third parts of the album's final song "We're Not Gonna Take It": "See Me, Feel Me" and "Listening to You". It was released as a single in September 1970. The song is not identified as a separate track on the 1969 studio version of the album.

The Who performed "See Me, Feel Me", followed by the refrain of "Listening to You", at the 1969 Woodstock Festival. This was captured on film in the 1970 documentary Woodstock and the 1979 rockumentary The Kids Are Alright. "See Me, Feel Me" was also released as a single in the United States to capitalise on its appearance in the Woodstock film. Entering the charts on 26 September 1970, it reached number 12 on the US Pop Singles Chart. It was also released in the United Kingdom but did not chart there. On the New Zealand Listener charts it reached number 16. In Canada it reached number 4.

The band performed the song at the Closing Ceremony of the 2012 Olympic Games in London on Sunday 12 August 2012, along with "Baba O'Riley" and "My Generation".
