= Bill Curbishley =

English music and film producer

- Born: William George Curbishley; 13 March 1942 (age 83)
- Occupations: Producer; manager
- Labels: Track

William George Curbishley (born 13 March 1942) is an English music and film producer and band manager. He has managed English rock groups the Who and Judas Priest, as well as artists Jimmy Page and Robert Plant.

== Life ==
Curbishley was one of six children born in London to a docker and his wife. He is the older brother of ex-West Ham United and Charlton Athletic manager Alan Curbishley, and grew up near West Ham Station in London. He married Jackie Curbishley, but the couple later divorced. He then remarried and had two children.

During the 1960s, Curbishley served a prison term for armed robbery of a bank van, though he denied involvement in the crime.

Curbishley owns a London home and a villa in Spain.

== Career ==
Curbishley started his career in the music business in 1971 at Track Records, managing tours for the Who and other artists such as Thunderclap Newman, Golden Earring and the Crazy World of Arthur Brown. Curbishley produced the Who's film Tommy, the prison movie McVicar and also the film Buddy's Song, all starring the Who's Roger Daltrey. With Daltrey, he also established the Goldhawke production company to issue the singer's solo albums. Curbishley left Track in the mid-seventies after financial issues led to the decline of the company. With his wife Jackie, he established Trinifold Management Ltd., a music management company, in 1974.

After a royalty dispute, Curbishley's company acquired management of the Who in 1976 and soon expanded to manage other well-known artists such as Judas Priest and Robert Plant. It was at the suggestion of Curbishley that Plant disbanded his Shaken 'n' Stirred touring ensemble in the mid-1980s, starting afresh with a completely new band and writing with different musicians. As a direct result of this, Plant re-emerged as a hugely successful recording and touring artist.

In 1994, Curbishley assumed management of guitarist Jimmy Page, and in the same year, was integral in the reuniting of Page and Plant, both former members of Led Zeppelin. Despite failed attempts by others to reunite the pair, Curbishely was able to persuade the previously reluctant Plant to work with Page again, resulting in the highly successful Unledded album, video and world tour. During this period, Curbishley and Trinifold also managed the solo career of Francis Dunnery (former frontman of It Bites, and Plant's guitarist prior to his reunion with Page).

Trinifold Music has published songs recorded by many other artists including Chicago, Kenny Rogers, Atlantic Starr, Karyn White, Faith Hill and Kenny Chesney. In 2004, UB40 and Rachel Fuller were added to Trinifold's roster. In 2001, Curbishley served as the executive producer of a BBC1 documentary on the life of Reggie Kray.

In 2002, Trinifold was acquired by The Sanctuary Group, but Curbishley continued to manage the company. He later embarked on more film production projects, including films such as The Railway Man.

== Producer filmography ==
Selected films include:

- The Railway Man - 2013
- My Generation: Who's Still Who - 2008
- Amazing Journey: Six Quick Ones - 2007
- Amazing Journey: The Story of the Who - 2007
- The Who: Tommy and Quadrophenia - Live with Special Guests - 2005
- The Who: Live in Boston - 2003
- Led Zeppelin - 2003
- The Who & Special Guests: Live at the Royal Albert Hall - 2000
- Mastercard Masters of Music Concert for the Prince's Trust - 1996
- Unplugged: Jimmy Page & Robert Plant Un-Led-ed - 1994
- The Who: Thirty Years of Maximum R&B - 1994
- Great Performances: Pete Townshend's Psychoderelict - 1993
- Buddy's Song - 1991
- The Who Live, Featuring the Rock Opera Tommy - 1989
- Deep End - 1986
- Status Quo - End Of The Road '84 - 1984
- Cool Cats: 25 Years of Rock 'n' Roll Style - 1983
- McVicar - 1980
- Quadrophenia - 1979
- The Who: The Kids Are Alright - 1979
- The Who: At Kilburn 1977 - 1977
- The Who: Live at the Isle of Wight Festival 1970 - 1970

== Bibliography ==
- Dave Lewis and Simon Pallett (1997) Led Zeppelin: The Concert File, London: Omnibus Press. ISBN 0-7119-5307-4, p. 138.
