= Kit Lambert =

English record producer, record label owner, raconteur and manager of The Who

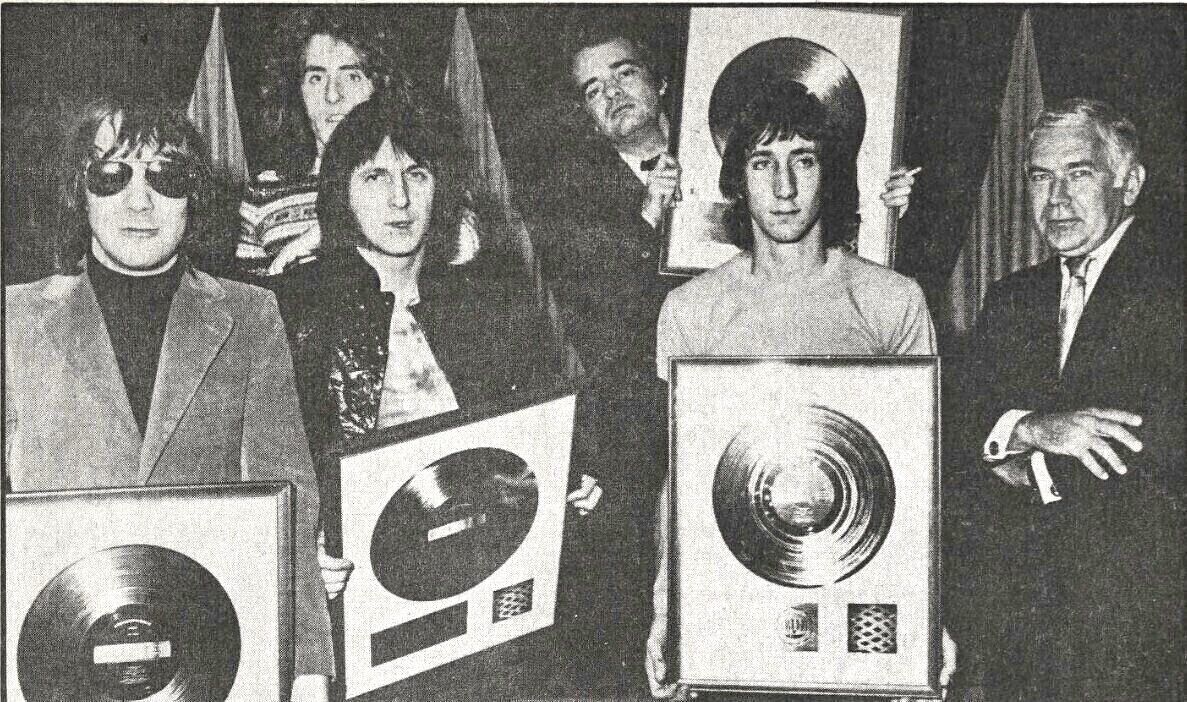
- Lambert (back row, right) posing with the Who as they celebrate Tommy becoming a gold record c. 1969
- Born: Christopher Sebastian Lambert; 11 May 1935; Knightsbridge, London, England
- Died: 7 April 1981 (aged 45); London, England
- Other names: Baron Lambert; Kit "The Baron" Lambert
- Occupations: Talent manager; record producer; record label owner
- Father: Constant Lambert
- Relatives: George Lambert (grandfather)
- Musical career
- Years active: 1964–1976 manager 1967–1978 label owner
- Label: Track Record

Christopher Sebastian "Kit" Lambert (11 May 1935 – 7 April 1981) was an English record producer, record label owner and the manager of the Who.

== Biography ==
=== Early life ===
Kit Lambert was born on 11 May 1935, the son of composer Constant Lambert and part-time actress Florence Kaye. He was the grandson of George Washington Lambert, a sculptor and painter who was an official war artist for the Australian government at Gallipoli during the First World War. His godfather was his father's friend and fellow composer, William Walton. His godmother was Margot Fonteyn, the prima ballerina who danced for Constant's company, The Royal Ballet, and with whom Constant had an affair causing him to leave Lambert's mother. Home life was difficult for Lambert who was sent to live with his grandmother at a young age. When he was 16, his father died at the age of 45.

=== Career in film and music ===
After studying history at Trinity College, Oxford, Lambert trained at the Mons Officer Cadet School and briefly served as an officer in the British Army to carry out his national service obligations; he was stationed in Hong Kong. After returning to civilian life, in May 1961, he joined an expedition with two Oxford friends, Richard Mason and John Hemming, in an attempt to discover the source of the Iriri River in the Amazon. Lambert hoped to film the expedition as a documentary. On 3 September, Mason was killed by an uncontacted Amazon tribe known as the Panará while he was alone hunting for food. Lambert was initially arrested on suspicion of murdering his friend but, after a concerted campaign in Britain by the Daily Express newspaper, which had financed the expedition, he was released. After returning to the United Kingdom, Lambert became an assistant director (AD) on the films The Guns of Navarone (1961), The L-Shaped Room (1962), and From Russia with Love (1963), which is when he met fellow AD Chris Stamp, brother of actor Terence Stamp.

Soon after, he and Stamp decided to make a documentary that would show the behind-the-scenes life of a pop group. The band they chose was the High Numbers (known previously, and again afterwards, as the Who). Lambert and Stamp began filming concerts of the group, but eventually abandoned the idea of the documentary, deciding instead to become the Who's managers, even though they had no experience managing a group. After the band was turned down by EMI, Lambert and Stamp signed them up with Shel Talmy, who had produced the Kinks hits, and whose company had an output deal through Decca Records in the UK. Lambert eventually replaced Talmy as the group's producer in 1966, starting with "I'm a Boy", which reached number two on the UK Singles Chart.

=== Track Records ===
"Pete always hated Kit's production. Some of the mixes Kit did were terrible. He was always a bit bass-light, which used to upset John, but recording circumstances were different in those days...[and] we didn't have a lot to play with. But Kit was incredibly adventurous. He'd fly in, throw everything at the wall, tear it down and rebuild it. We'd do layers and layers. We'd do harmonies all over the place, building them up by bouncing one track onto another, on those three-tracks. This allowed us to get the backing vocal harmonies sounding like we were a 12-piece vocal group."

— Roger Daltrey, reflecting upon Lambert's early production style with the Who in his autobiography

In 1967, Lambert and Stamp established their own independent record label, Track Records, one of the first of its kind, signing up various new artists, including Jimi Hendrix, Arthur Brown (producing his No. 1 single, "Fire", and parent studio album The Crazy World of Arthur Brown in 1968), Thunderclap Newman, John Lennon and Yoko Ono, and Golden Earring. In 1968, they set up offices in New York and signed Labelle, whose eponymous debut studio album Labelle, Lambert produced, and the Parliaments. The label initially proved very lucrative for the duo but due to fiscal mismanagement and ongoing conflicts with the Who it soon fell into debt and was dissolved in 1978.

=== Tommy ===
Ever since the beginning of their working relationship Lambert had been trying to convince Pete Townshend to move away from simple songwriting and compose more mature fare using his troubled childhood as a starting point. Townshend has acknowledged that it was Lambert who influenced him to combine rock music and opera, which led to the creation of the rock opera Tommy. Although the Who were international hitmakers by the late 1960s, it was not until the release of Tommy in 1969 that the band became firmly established both creatively and commercially.

=== Firing ===
While the Who was struggling to articulate Townshend's next concept, Lifehouse (which would eventually be abandoned, and turned into the popular rock album Who's Next), Lambert began shopping a film version of Tommy without the band's authorization. This led to significant differences between Lambert and the group.

Despite this, in 1973, Townshend contacted Lambert, asking him to help with the recording of Quadrophenia, but Lambert's drug abuse and the allegations of missing funds stalled efforts at a reconciliation. After litigation was initiated for unpaid royalties, both Lambert and Stamp were sacked in 1974 and replaced by Bill Curbishley, who still manages the band. They officially ended their partnership with the band two years later. On 22 January 1977, the Who settled their lawsuit against Lambert and Stamp. Townshend received a $1 million settlement for his US copyrights to date and the Who gained rights to all their recordings from "Substitute" onwards.

In 1978, Lambert worked with some early punk bands including producing a couple of singles for groups Razr and Chelsea, the latter under the name Kit "The Baron" Lambert.

=== Ward of court ===
At the peak of his success Lambert owned a flat in Knightsbridge, London, and Palazzo Dario on the Grand Canal in Venice, where he was known as Baron Lambert. Lambert claimed that he was conceived in Venice and hence was connected to the city. His neighbour was the heiress and renowned Modern Art collector, Peggy Guggenheim, with whom Lambert was rumoured to be romantically linked. However, back in the UK his excessive drug use brought him to the attention of the British police and he was arrested and charged with possession of heroin. As a defence, and one rarely used, a lawyer convinced Lambert to become a Ward of the Court of Protection whereby he would avoid drug charges and a potential prison sentence while an Official Solicitor would take charge of his affairs. As a ward Kit would be provided with a small weekly stipend out of his own money to live on amounting to approximately £150 per week, even though royalties from the albums that Lambert produced for the Who and Hendrix were steadily increasing each year.

=== Book and final days ===
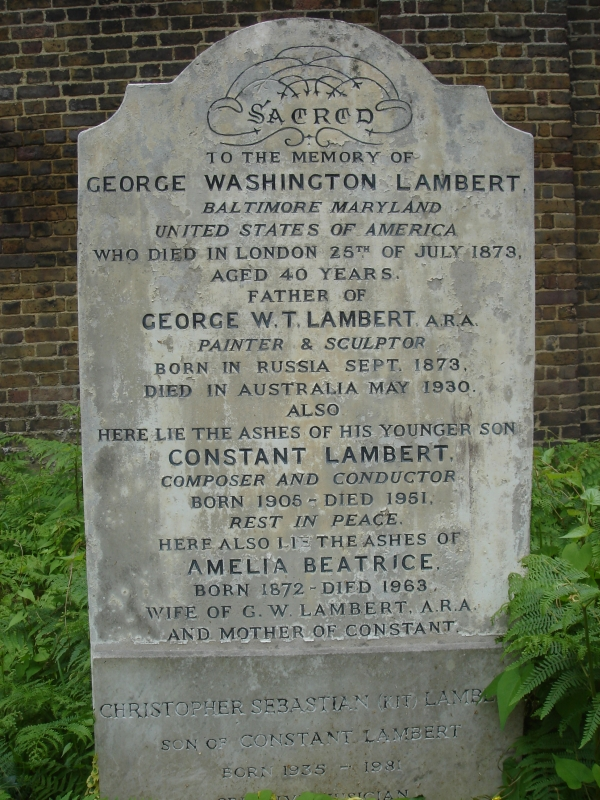
Family monument, Brompton Cemetery, with Lambert’s name added

In 1980, Lambert began writing an autobiography with journalist Jon Lindsay, detailing how he discovered the Who. It included many never-before-told stories about his contemporaries the Beatles, the Rolling Stones, Brian Epstein, and Jimi Hendrix, and friends like Princess Margaret and Liberace. However, days before Lambert was to sign a publishing deal, the publisher was contacted by the Official Solicitor in charge of Lambert's life, who stated that all revenues from the sale of the book had to be paid to the court, which would then dole them out to Lambert. That was the beginning of Lambert's downward spiral, increasing his dependence on drugs and alcohol.

Lambert died on 7 April 1981 of a intracerebral hemorrhage after falling down a flight of stairs. On the night of his death, he was seen drinking heavily at a popular Kensington watering hole, El Sombrero, where, according to many, including Townshend, he was beaten up by a drug dealer over an unpaid debt, which contributed to his fall and death. In his autobiography Bowie, Bolan and the Brooklyn Guy, record producer Tony Visconti stated: "He [Lambert] was already in advanced stages of whatever. He died when a coke dealer pushed him downstairs." Lambert was cremated and his ashes interred in Brompton Cemetery, London, in the grave of his father, paternal grandfather, and grandmother.

By 2018, his original inscription on the family headstone – "Christopher Sebastian 'Kit' Lambert – Son of Constant 1935–1981 Creative Musician" – was virtually illegible. Nick Salaman, a friend since they were at university, wrote in the Friends of Brompton Cemetery magazine: "He was more than a creative musician. And who was this Christopher Sebastian Lambert? Did anyone know or care about his full name? An idea popped in my mind to put up a new gravestone that spelt out exactly who Kit was and what he was famous for." A new stone, paid for by Salaman, and Kit's only surviving relative, his half-sister Annie, was added to the bottom in place of the original one. Unveiled in a ceremony at midday on 12 June 2018, it is inscribed: "Also Constant's son, Kit Lambert, 1935–1981, The man who made The Who".

== The Lamberts biography ==
Some material compiled by Lambert and Lindsay was included in a book called The Lamberts by writer and poet Andrew Motion, the British Poet Laureate, which won the Somerset Maugham Award literary prize in 1986. The tapes made of Lambert's interviews were several hours in length and became an important historical reference both of the era of pop and rock music as well as of Lambert's own tumultuous life. On the tapes he dispelled some of the rumours that he himself had deliberately perpetuated to generate publicity about his charges. Lambert's methods in promoting groups like the Who were far more eccentric and strange than was popularly believed.

The two surviving members of the Who, Townshend and Roger Daltrey, have always acknowledged Lambert as a major influence on the band's success, along with his business partner Chris Stamp. After his death his estate was worth over £490,000 and the royalties that have flowed in from his various activities have totaled over £1 million.

== Popular culture ==
In 2012 British actor Cary Elwes with Jon Lindsay and music promoter Simon Napier Bell announced they had written a script on Lambert's life. Actor Colin Firth expressed interest in playing Lambert. As yet there have been no plans to produce the film. In 2014, an American documentary film was made about Kit Lambert and Chris Stamp entitled Lambert & Stamp. It was produced and directed by James D. Cooper. It had its world premiere at 2014 Sundance Film Festival on 20 January 2014. According to Lapin (2015), Lambert was a homosexual.

== Newspaper references ==
- Billboard magazine – 7 December 1968
- Pittsburgh Post-Gazette – 30 June 1979
- Pittsburgh Post-Gazette – 3 December 1979
- Toledo Blade 8 April 1981
- Lambert & Stamp review 28 March 2015
- Kingsport Post – 4 November 1971
