= It's Not True =

1965 song by the Who

Song by the Who

from the album My Generation
- Released: 3 December 1965
- Recorded: 10 November 1965
- Studio: IBC, London
- Genre: Beat
- Length: 2:32
- Label: Brunswick
- Songwriter: Pete Townshend
- Producer: Shel Talmy

Licensed audio
- "It's Not True" on YouTube

"It's Not True" is a song written by British guitarist Pete Townshend and first recorded by his band the Who in 1965. Townshend wrote the song in mid-1965, drawing inspiration from fans of the group's fan club who felt that the music press wrote lies about the band. The Who recorded "It's Not True" at IBC Studios in London on 10 November 1965, with Shel Talmy producing and Glyn Johns engineering. Musically, the song features a jolting rhythm similar to that of "My Generation", and draws from the Beat sound of contemporary music. Lyrically, "It's Not True" tells the tale of a narrator who is subject to rumours and lies spread by his friends, in which he has to dispel through lines that he was not "born in Baghdad" or that he "did not kill his dad".

Brunswick Records released My Generation on 3 December 1965 in the UK, with "It's Not True" sequenced in between two cover songs. In the US, it was subsequently issued on The Who Sings My Generation on 25 April 1966 through Decca Records. In 2002, "It's Not True" received its first stereo mix. Critical reception from the band members was mixed; drummer Keith Moon favoured the track whereas Townshend lambasted it in the music press. Retrospective assessment has seen "It's Not True" as representative of Townshend's emerging songwriting talent. "It's Not True" was performed by the Who on television and radio on several occasions. Shel Talmy produced a cover of the song by the Untamed, which was released a week after My Generation. It has also been covered by the Amboy Dukes.

== Background and recording ==
Like all pop stars of the era we pretended we were free and single. I was indeed free and single; the only one of the band who was.

— Pete Townshend (2016)

"It's Not True" was one of several songs guitarist Pete Townshend wrote during the summer of 1965, after a projected cover-heavy debut album for the Who was scrapped following negative feedback from the music press. This occurred during a particularly creative spark that "generated the band's vitality and drive", with manager Kit Lambert picking suitable compositions by Townshend for the band to record. According to Townshend, "It's Not True" was inspired by female fans from the Who's fan club, who suggested that everything written about the group in the news was untrue; they knew lead vocalist Roger Daltrey was married, and that drummer Keith Moon was in a fling with Kim Kerrigan. This was kept secret in the press. Townshend initially recorded a demo of the song at his flat in Chesham Place, Belgravia. (Note: This demo was first made available on the 2016 box set re-issue of My Generation. In 2016, Townshend expressed surprise over not including the demo on any of his Scoop compilation albums.) When overdubbing additional vocals onto the track, Townshend "discovered how easy it was to harmonize".

Working "close to Townshend's home demos", The Who convened at IBC Studios in London on 10 November 1965 to record and mix "It's Not True" alongside three other Townshend compositions. (Note: The other songs being "The Good's Gone", "La-La-La-Lies", and "Much Too Much". Earlier sources state the song as having been recorded at IBC on 12 and 13 October 1965,) The song was recorded onto three-track tape. The session was produced by Shel Talmy, with Glyn Johns and Michael Weighell engineering. The track was recorded by the Who's regular musical quartet of Daltrey on lead vocals, Townshend on guitar, John Entwistle on bass, and Moon on drums. The four were augmented by Nicky Hopkins, a session musician favoured by Talmy, who provided piano on the track. In 2022, Talmy recalled that the band was interrupted by interference that "sounded like morse code" from the nearby Embassy of China during the first take of "It's Not True"; after a brief pause and visit to the pub, the band returned to the studio and recorded a second take of the song, which became the master.

== Composition and lyrics ==
With a runtime of 2 minutes and 32 seconds, "It's Not True" opens with an a cappella performance of the title which leads into a "brisk pace". According to biographer John Atkins, "It's Not True" was one of several songs that employ the "short, jolting rhythm" that was present in their single "My Generation" (1965). He attributes the "chugging" verses as owing something to the melody line of Chuck Berry's "Memphis, Tennessee". Writer Chris Charlesworth opines that "It's Not True" has a "lighter touch" than the rest of the album, approaching the "typical Beat group sound of the sixties". With the rhythm section "pounding away", Charlesworth felt it was a "far cry from Merseybeat". Similarly, critic Dave Marsh commented on Moon's drumming on the song as proving "his ability to play straight-ahead rock drums".

Hopkins' piano performance was described as "suitably unorthodox" by Atkins, in contrast to much of his other playing on the album which tended to "dampen the abrasive edge of the songs". During the song's break at 1 minutes and 35 seconds, Townshend's guitar starts "tolling like a funeral bell", with Daltrey' voice acquiring a "menacing tone". Similarly, biographer Mike Segretto felt that Daltrey's vocal performance on the track was convincing because he travelled back to "his choirboy beginnings". Similarly, biographer Mark Blake believed Daltrey's vocal performance was with "total conviction".

Lyrically, Segretto identifies "It's Not True" as an "angrier, more defiant cousin" of Townshend's contemporary composition "La-La-La-Lies" (1965), in that it "retaliates" against lies spread by a young man's friends. Similarly, writer Christian Suchatzki writes that the song is "La-La-La-Lies"'s equal in its lyrical composition. According to Marsh, the narrator in the lyrics attempts to defend himself against distortions and rumours by "negotiation" as he has to assert "who he is not". Atkinson noted the lyrics as having been given a more "comical treatment" than other of the band's other songs at this stage. He further added that they were a representation of the "frustration in the face of gross misrepresentation" by a character desperate to "achieve vindication" with the loss of love "clearly at stake". Charlesworth believes that the "slanderous rumours" that Daltrey denies were "most likely true". For Blake, lines regarding not fathering "eleven kids", not "being born in Baghdad", not "being half-Chinese", and "not killing his dad" represented some of Townshend's most odd and off-beat lyrics.

== Release and reception ==
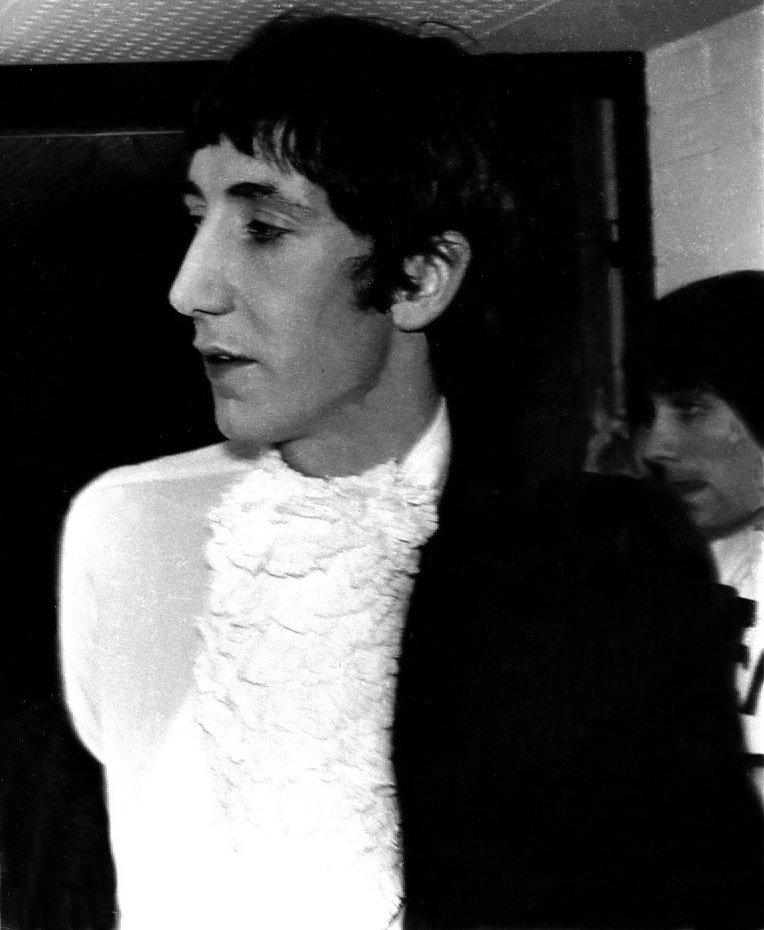
Pete Townshend lambasted "It's Not True" and My Generation's other tracks upon original release.

According to Talmy, it was thought that "It's Not True" was destined to become an A-side for the Who, but in the face of other great material, it was relegated as an album track instead. "It's Not True" was first released on the Who's debut album My Generation through Brunswick Records in the UK on 3 December 1965, (Note: Catalogue number LAT 8616.) where it was sequenced between the covers "Please, Please, Please" and "I'm a Man". On 25 April 1966, Decca Records in the US released the album in a reconfigured form as The Who Sings My Generation, (Note: Catalogue number Decca DL 4664 (mono), DL-7 4664 (Rechannelled stereo).) with "It's Not True" sequenced between "Please, Please, Please" and "The Ox". The album was originally only mixed in mono, with "It's Not True" and the rest of the tracks first receiving a true stereo remix in 2002.

The song provided conflicting opinions by the band; Keith Moon listed "It's Not True" alongside "The Kids Are Alright", "The Good's Gone", and "La-La-La-Lies" as his favourite songs from the album in the New Musical Express. On the contrary, Townshend "lambasted" the song in an interview with Richard Green of Record Mirror. According to Townshend, "It's Not True" was "everybody's favourite track" from the album, though he "hated it". He suggested giving the song away to a "new Country & Western" group called the "New Faces". Blake felt that Townshend's "blunt assessment" of the track was a response to the lyric about poking fun at "press sensationalism".

For Jim Beviglia of American Songwriter, "It's Not True" represented a "standout on a relationship gone wrong". Charlesworth praised Moon's performance on the track, claiming that he "excels" on "an upbeat song". According to Suchatzki, Townshend's lyrics showed a "remarkable creativity". Similarly, Goldmine's Dave Thompson noted the song as one that pinpointed Pete Townshend as a "songwriter supreme", who had a better grasp on "teenage hormones than anyone else at the time". Michael Fremer of Analog Planet similarly believed that the rebellious theme heard in "It's Not True" would also appear in Townshend's later compositions.

== Other versions ==
Though relegated as an album track, "It's Not True" became a mainstay for the Who in radio and television appearances. "It's Not True" debuted on radio when the Who recorded a rendition produced by Jimmy Grant at BBC Radio's Maida Vale Studios on 22 November 1965, together with the tracks "The Good's Gone", "La-La-La-Lies", "My Generation" and "Baby Don't You Do It" in a version which was broadcast on the BBC Light Programme's Saturday Club show on 27 November. The Who also performed it live on ITV's Ready Steady Go! on 3 December 1965 in an appearance to promote the My Generation album. It was similarly performed on the 19 August 1966 broadcast of Ready Steady Go! to promote the single "I'm a Boy" (1966).

Shel Talmy felt that "It's Not True" was single material, and Townshend agreed to let another band record it. Talmy recorded a cover of the song by British band the Untamed on 29 November 1965 at IBC with Glyn Johns producing. (Note: The Untamed also recorded the Pete Townshend composition "Kids Take Over", which was never taped by the Who.) Their version was released through Talmy's independent record label Planet Records on 10 December 1965, a week after the My Generation album was released. However, the Untamed's recording did not "help them make the charts". In 1967, the Amboy Dukes recorded a rendition for their eponymous debut album in a version AllMusic critic Joe Viglione called "experimental".

== Personnel ==
Personnel according to the liner notes of the 2002 CD re-issue of My Generation, unless otherwise noted.

The Who

- Roger Daltrey – lead vocals
- Pete Townshend – guitar, vocals
- John Entwistle – bass guitar, vocals
- Keith Moon – drums

Other personnel

- Nicky Hopkins – piano
- Shel Talmy – producer
- Glyn Johns – engineer
- Michael Weighell – engineer

== Bibliography ==
- Atkins, John (2000). The Who on Record: A Critical History (1st ed.). United States: McFarland & Company. ISBN 0-7864-0609-7 – via Internet Archive.
- Blake, Mark (2016). My Generation (Super Deluxe Edition) (Box set liner notes). Europe: Brunswick. 5372740.
- Charlesworth, Chris (1995). The Complete Guide to the Music of the Who. United Kingdom: Omnibus Press. ISBN 0-7119-4306-0 – via Internet Archive.
- Neill, Andy (2002). My Generation (Deluxe Edition) (CD liner notes). United Kingdom: MCA. 112 926-2.
- Neill, Andy; Kent, Matt (2009). Anyway, Anyhow, Anywhere: The Complete Chronicle of the Who 1958-1978 (2nd ed.). United Kingdom: Sterling. ISBN 978-1-4027669-1-6.
- Marsh, Dave (1983). Before I Get Old: the Story of the Who. United States: St. Martin's Press. ISBN 0-312-07155-8 – via Internet Archive.
- Segretto, Mike (2014). The Who FAQ: All That's Left to Know About Fifty Years of Maximum. United Kingdom: Backbeat Books. ISBN 978-1-480-3610-34.
- Suchatzki, Christian (2026). The Who - Song by Song. United Kingdom: Fonthill. ISBN 978-1-0361526-0-4.
