= Meaty Beaty Big and Bouncy =

1971 compilation album by The Who

Compilation album by the Who
- Released: November 1971
- Recorded: 1964–1970
- Genre: Rock
- Length: 43:20
- Labels: Decca/MCA (US and Canada); Track/Polydor
- Producers: Kit Lambert; Shel Talmy; The Who

The Who chronology
Who's Next (1971)	Meaty Beaty Big and Bouncy (1971)	Quadrophenia (1973)

Meaty Beaty Big and Bouncy is a compilation album of singles by the English rock band the Who, released in 1971 as Track 2406 006 in the UK and as Decca DL 79184 in the US. It entered the US Billboard 200 chart on 20 November 1971, peaking at number 11, and the UK chart on 3 December 1971, peaking at number 9.

== Background ==
Meaty Beaty Big and Bouncy was compiled by Pete Townshend. The band's manager Kit Lambert attempted to have the track order changed but failed because too many copies had already been pressed. The UK release was held up because the Who and their other manager Bill Curbishley had failed to clear it with Lambert.

Several songs on the album had previously been released on studio albums. The Who's debut My Generation included the tracks "A Legal Matter" and "The Kids Are Alright"; A Quick One included "Boris the Spider", the one song included which had been written by John Entwistle, and in its American configuration "Happy Jack". "I Can See for Miles" appeared on The Who Sell Out, and "Pinball Wizard" on Tommy. "Pictures of Lily" and "Magic Bus" previously appeared on the US compilation album Magic Bus: The Who on Tour.

Aside from "Boris the Spider", every track on the album had been released as a single in the UK; further, all except "A Legal Matter", "Magic Bus", and "The Seeker" were top ten hits. "Happy Jack", "I Can See for Miles", "Magic Bus", and "Pinball Wizard" had also been Top 40 hits in the US.

While "I'm a Boy" had also been released as a single in the UK, it is represented here by an alternate, longer and slower version that was recorded three months after the original single release. "I Can See For Miles" is an edit of the The Who Sell Out album track rather than the single mix itself, which is easily identifiable by its unique bassline. The original UK and European Track Records LP pressings of Meaty Beaty Big And Bouncy also contained a longer alternate mix of "Magic Bus" that ran an extra minute to a cold ending rather than ending with the more familiar fadeout. This version was however substituted on US pressings and all subsequent CD reissues with the more commonly available version that previously appeared on the US compilation album Magic Bus: The Who on Tour.

Most of the tracks on this album would reappear in subsequent compilations and super deluxe editions.

== Packaging ==
The album is named after the members of the band: "Meaty" is Daltrey, who was quite fit at the time; "Beaty" is Moon, for his drumming; "Big" is Entwistle, who was a large person, often referred to as "The Ox" (lending his nickname to the instrumental of the same name); and "Bouncy" was Townshend, who jumped about quite acrobatically during performances. The album's original title was The Who Looks Back.

On the front cover the Who are looking at four children, one of whom is Curbishley's younger brother Paul. The panoramic photograph featured on the inside cover of the gatefold vinyl packaging is an exterior shot of the side of the Railway Hotel, a pub that was sited on the bridge next to Harrow & Wealdstone station in north-west London. The Railway Hotel was a popular hangout for Mods and the Who became a regular attraction there from June 1964, shortly after Keith Moon joined the band, performing every Tuesday night. It was here that Kit Lambert, their manager, first saw the band, and here that Pete Townshend accidentally cracked his guitar's neck on the low ceiling above the stage. In response to laughter from the crowd, he then smashed his guitar for the first time in public, a gimmick he maintained for many years when playing live. The band were filmed at the venue on 11 August – a copy of the recording turning up in 2002. The hotel was destroyed by fire in March 2000, after becoming empty and vandalised. The site is now occupied by blocks of flats where the buildings, such as Moon House and Daltrey House, are named after the band members.

== Critical reception ==
Professional ratings
Review scores
Source	Rating
AllMusic	5/5 stars
Christgau's Record Guide	A−
The Encyclopedia of Popular Music	5/5 stars
MusicHound Rock	5/5
The Rolling Stone Album Guide	5/5 stars
Tom Hull – on the Web	A+

Robert Christgau remarked that "In England, this is a greatest hits album [but] in the U.S., where some of these songs have never been released and most have never made the charts, it's a mishmash revelation". Dave Marsh, however, greeted the collection as a disappointment for true fans because Townshend had publicly promised a rich, surprising, and comprehensive collection. Noting that less than half the tracks were new to the U.S. in any way, Marsh wrote somewhat bitterly on the predictable "greatest hits" nature of the tracklist: "Meaty Beaty isn't half what it pretends to be, nor is it anywhere near what it COULD have been. It's not the album we dreamed about, Peter, but since there's so much other stuff lying around unissued, do you think you could try it again?" At the time there were many rarities in the Who catalog – B-sides, demos, and other tracks that were UK-only, live, or previously unreleased – and Marsh complained, "Why reissue things for the second (third) time on an album when you have such an incredible backlog of material?" In 1987, Rolling Stone ranked it number 99 on their list of the 100 best albums of the period 1967–1987.

== Track listing ==
All tracks are written by Pete Townshend except where noted.

Side one
No.	Title	Original release	Length
1.	"I Can't Explain"	single, 1964	2:05
2.	"The Kids Are Alright" (US edit)	The Who Sings My Generation, 1966	2:45
3.	"Happy Jack"	Happy Jack, 1967	2:12
4.	"I Can See for Miles"	The Who Sell Out, 1967	4:06
5.	"Pictures of Lily"	single, 1967	2:43
6.	"My Generation"	My Generation, 1965	3:18
7.	"The Seeker"	single, 1970	3:11
Total length:			20:20

Side two
No.	Title	Writer(s)	Original release	Length
1.	"Anyway, Anyhow, Anywhere"	Roger Daltrey, Townshend	single, 1965	2:42
2.	"Pinball Wizard"		Tommy, 1969	2:59
3.	"A Legal Matter"		My Generation, 1965	2:48
4.	"Boris the Spider"	John Entwistle	A Quick One, 1966	2:28
5.	"Magic Bus" (alternate extended version, no fadeout)		single, 1968 (this version previously unreleased)	4:33
6.	"Substitute"		single, 1966	3:49
7.	"I'm a Boy" (alternate mix with extended instrumental section)		single, 1966 (this version previously unreleased)	3:41
Total length:				23:00 43:20

Note: Original US MCA pressings and later standard CD pressings swap out the extended 'Magic Bus' for the shorter mix from the 'Magic Bus: The Who On Tour' compilation.

== Personnel ==
=== The Who ===
- Roger Daltrey – lead vocals
- Pete Townshend – guitar, keyboards, backing and lead vocals
- John Entwistle – bass, backing and lead vocals
- Keith Moon – drums

=== Additional personnel ===
- Nicky Hopkins – piano on "Anyway, Anyhow, Anywhere", "A Legal Matter" and "The Seeker"
- Kit Lambert, Shel Talmy – production
- Bill Curbishley, Mike Shaw – album design
- Graham Hughes – photography
- Steve Hoffman – compact disc mastering

== Charts ==
Chart performance for Meaty Beaty Big and Bouncy
Chart (1971)	Peak position
UK Albums Chart	9
US Billboard Pop Albums	11

== Certifications ==
Certifications for Meaty Beaty Big and Bouncy
Region	Certification	Certified units/sales
United States (RIAA)	Platinum	1,000,000^{^}
^{^} Shipments figures based on certification alone.
