= BBC Sessions (The Who album) =

Live album compilation by the Who
- Released: 15 February 2000
- Recorded: 1965–1973 at various locations
- Genre: Rock
- Length: 72:00; Including Best Buy limited edition bonus tracks: 97:45
- Label: Polydor
- Producer: Michael Appleton; Bernie Andrews; Bill Bebb; Jimmy Grant; Bev Phillips; Brian Willey; Paul Williams

The Who chronology
20th Century Masters – The Millennium Collection: The Best of the Who (1999)	BBC Sessions (2000)	Blues to the Bush (2000)

Professional ratings
Review scores
Source	Rating
AllMusic	4.5/5 stars
The Encyclopedia of Popular Music	4/5 stars
Rolling Stone	4/5 stars

BBC Sessions is a live compilation album by the English rock band the Who, released on 15 February 2000 by Polydor Records internationally and MCA Records in the US. It contains 24 songs and two jingles recorded live at the BBC studios in London.

With the exception of the jingles being used to bookend the album, and the third track being misplaced, the Who's recordings are presented in chronological order. Most of the recordings are for the programmes Top Gear or Saturday Club and were recorded between 24 May 1965 and 10 October 1967. Tracks 20–23 were recorded on 14 April 1970 for the Dave Lee Travis Show while tracks 24–25 were recorded on 29 January 1973 for The Old Grey Whistle Test.

== Track listing ==
Due to publishing restrictions, the American version dropped "Man With Money" and edited out the lines from "Spoonful" in the medley with "Shakin' All Over".

All tracks are written by Pete Townshend, except where noted.

No.	Title	Recording and broadcast details	Length
1.	"My Generation (BBC Radio 1 Jingle)"	Recorded 10 October 1967, at De Lane Lea Studios; Broadcast on Top Gear, 15 October 1967	0:57
2.	"Anyway, Anyhow, Anywhere" (Pete Townshend, Roger Daltrey)	Recorded 24 May 1965, at Aeolian Hall; Broadcast on Saturday Club, 29 May 1965	2:44
3.	"Good Lovin'" (Rudy Clark, Arthur Resnick)	Recorded 15 June 1965 at Aeolian Hall; Broadcast on Top Gear, 19 June 1965	1:49
4.	"Just You and Me, Darling" (James Brown)	Recorded 24 May 1965, at Aeolian Hall; Broadcast on Saturday Club, 29 May 1965	2:01
5.	"Leaving Here" (Holland-Dozier-Holland)	Recorded 24 May 1965, at Aeolian Hall; Broadcast on Saturday Club, 29 May 1965	2:34
6.	"My Generation"	Recorded 22 November 1965, at Aeolian Hall; Broadcast on Saturday Club, 27 November 1965	3:23
7.	"The Good's Gone"	Recorded 22 November 1965, at Aeolian Hall; Broadcast on Saturday Club, 27 November 1965	2:59
8.	"La-La-La-Lies"	Recorded 22 November 1965, at Aeolian Hall; Broadcast on Saturday Club, 27 November 1965	2:11
9.	"Substitute"	Recorded 15 March 1966, at Aeolian Hall; Broadcast on Saturday Club, 19 March 1966	3:30
10.	"Man With Money" (Don Everly, Phil Everly)	Recorded 15 March 1966, at Aeolian Hall; Broadcast on Saturday Club, 19 March 1966	2:31
11.	"Dancing in the Street" (William "Mickey" Stevenson, Marvin Gaye, Ivy Jo Hunter)	Recorded 15 March 1966, at Aeolian Hall; Broadcast on Saturday Club, 19 March 1966	2:23
12.	"Disguises"	Recorded 13 September 1966, at BBC Playhouse Theatre; Broadcast on Saturday Club, 17 September 1966	2:57
13.	"I'm a Boy"	Recorded 13 September 1966, at BBC Playhouse Theatre; Broadcast on Saturday Club, 17 September 1966	2:39
14.	"Run Run Run"	Recorded 17 January 1967, at BBC Playhouse Theatre; Broadcast on Saturday Club, 21 January 1967	3:16
15.	"Boris the Spider" (John Entwistle)	Recorded 17 January 1967, at BBC Playhouse Theatre; Broadcast on Saturday Club, 21 January 1967	2:13
16.	"Happy Jack"	Recorded 17 January 1967, at BBC Playhouse Theatre; Broadcast on Saturday Club, 21 January 1967	2:09
17.	"See My Way" (Roger Daltrey)	Recorded 17 January 1967, at BBC Playhouse Theatre; Broadcast on Saturday Club, 21 January 1967	1:50
18.	"Pictures of Lily"	Recorded 10 October 1967, at De Lane Lea Studios; Broadcast on Top Gear, 15 October 1967	2:34
19.	"A Quick One (While He's Away)"	Recorded 10 October 1967, at De Lane Lea Studios; Broadcast on Top Gear, 15 October 1967	7:01
20.	"Substitute (Version 2)"	recorded 13 April 1970, at IBC Studios; Broadcast on Dave Lee Travis Show, 19 April 1970	2:12
21.	"The Seeker"	recorded 13 April 1970, at IBC Studios; Broadcast on Dave Lee Travis Show, 19 April 1970	3:04
22.	"I'm Free"	recorded 13 April 1970, at IBC Studios; Broadcast on Dave Lee Travis Show, 19 April 1970	2:24
23.	"Shakin' All Over" / "Spoonful" (Johnny Kidd, Willie Dixon)	recorded 13 April 1970, at IBC Studios; Broadcast on Dave Lee Travis Show, 19 April 1970	3:41
24.	"Relay"	Recorded 29 January 1973, at BBC Television Centre; Broadcast on The Old Grey Whistle Test, 30 January 1973	4:56
25.	"Long Live Rock"	Recorded 29 January 1973, at BBC Television Centre; Broadcast on The Old Grey Whistle Test, 30 January 1973	3:52
26.	"Boris the Spider (BBC Radio 1 Jingle)" (John Entwistle)	Recorded 10 October 1967, at De Lane Lea Studios; Broadcast on Top Gear, 15 October 1967	0:10

Best Buy limited edition bonus disc
No.	Title	Length
1.	"Townshend Talks Tommy"	2:08
2.	"Pinball Wizard"	2:21
3.	"See Me, Feel Me"	2:49
4.	"I Don't Even Know Myself"	4:53
5.	"I Can See for Miles"	3:49
6.	"Heaven and Hell" (John Entwistle)	3:27
7.	"The Seeker"	3:11
8.	"Summertime Blues" (Eddie Cochran, Jerry Capehart)	3:07
