= Boris the Spider =

1966 song by the Who

Song by the Who

from the album A Quick One
- A-side: "Whiskey Man"
- Released: 9 December 1966
- Recorded: 4 October 1966
- Studio: Pye (London)
- Genre: Rock
- Length: 2:29
- Songwriter: John Entwistle
- Producer: Kit Lambert

Official audio
- "Boris the Spider" on YouTube

"Boris the Spider" is a song written by the Who's bass guitarist, John Entwistle. It appears as the second track on their second studio album, A Quick One (1966). This song is claimed to be Entwistle's first composition, and became a staple of live shows. This song, along with "My Wife", "Heaven and Hell" and "The Quiet One", were Entwistle's most popular songs to perform live. Though this song was popular, it was not released as a single in the US or UK. In Japan, "Boris the Spider" was released as the B-side to "Whiskey Man" in 1967.

== Background ==
"Boris the Spider" was written after Entwistle had been out drinking with the Rolling Stones' bass guitarist, Bill Wyman. They were making up funny animals names when Entwistle came up with "Boris the Spider". The song was written by Entwistle in six minutes and, according to Entwistle in a 1971 interview for Crawdaddy, is considered a horror song.

The chorus of "Boris the Spider" was sung in basso profundo by Entwistle, mimicking a popular Spike Milligan character, Throat, from The Goon Show, with a middle eight of "creepy crawly" sung in falsetto. These discordant passages and the black comedy of the theme made the song a stage favourite.

According to Pete Townshend in his song-by-song review of Meaty Beaty Big and Bouncy (1971) for Rolling Stone, it was Jimi Hendrix's favourite Who song.

To commemorate the launch of the BBC's Radio One in 1967, the Who created a brief jingle for the station featuring Entwistle singing "Radio One" to the central riff. This recording was eventually released on the 1995 and 2009 reissues of The Who Sell Out (immediately after their cover version of "In the Hall of the Mountain King"), and at the end of their album BBC Sessions (2000). They created similar jingles to the tune of "My Generation" and "Happy Jack" (available on BBC Sessions and Thirty Years of Maximum R&B, respectively).

== Personnel ==
The Who

- Roger Daltrey – backing vocals
- John Entwistle – lead vocals; bass guitar
- Pete Townshend – backing vocals; guitar
- Keith Moon – drums

== Sequel ==
"My Size", the opening track of Entwistle's debut solo studio album, Smash Your Head Against the Wall (1971), is a sequel to "Boris the Spider". The closing riff of the song is the same as the one heard throughout "Boris the Spider". Regarding this, Entwistle stated: "I wrote it as a sequel to Boris the Spider for our manager. Our manager wanted me to put Boris the Spider on my album. So I wrote My Size and I wrote it in a sort of code so it sounds as if it were being sung about a woman. Then I stuck the ending on it as a clue. It wasn't a very good clue, I suppose."
