= The Marshmallow Overcoat =

American garage rock band

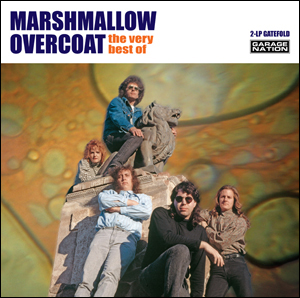
- Cover image to The Marshmallow Overcoat's 2-LP "The Very Best Of" (2014)

Background information
- Also known as: Marshmallow Overcoat, Overcoat
- Origin: Tucson, Arizona, United States
- Genre: Garage rock
- Years active: 1986–1996, 2000–2011
- Labels: Dionysus Records, Skyclad/Get Hip Records, 360 Twist! Records, Kinetic Vibes Records, Face Records, Music Maniac Records, Collectables Records, Purple Cactus Media Productions, Garage Nation Records
- Members: Timothy Gassen (aka "Randy Love"): vocals, band leader Scot Gassen: drum kit Dan Magee: bass Chad White: guitars Matt Rendon: guitars, bass, drum kit Bill Kurzenberger: keyboards Debra Dickey: keyboards
- Past members: Linda Andes; Jeff Dobberpuhl; Sean Randel; Mike Panico; Al Perry
- Website: Official website

The Marshmallow Overcoat is an American garage rock band, formed in Tucson, Arizona, in 1986 by lead singer Timothy Gassen under his "Randy Love" persona. They are considered an essential part of the paisley/neo-psychedelia bands that formed the 1980s.

== History ==
The Marshmallow Overcoat's first recording deal was with Dionysus Records in Los Angeles who released their first LP, The Inner Groove, in 1987. They received international attention for their brand of "modern psychedelia", and for generating the "Arizona sound." Influenced by The Chocolate Watchband, The Doors, The Beatles, The Byrds, Fuzztones, early Miracle Workers, Strawberry Alarm Clock, The Electric Prunes, 1960's garage/psychedelic music, their sound incorporates traditional fuzz with elements associated with these other genres, such as the use of the Farfisa organ and 12-string Rickenbacker guitars, re-created without clichéd regurgitation. Subsequent releases on Skyclad/Get Hip Records and two European labels, Music Maniac (Germany) and Psych-Out (France), and an international tour, earned them a fan base in Europe as well as the US.

Their music videos received airplay on more than 50 video shows on the top cable channels in the 1980s. MTV's "120 Minutes" aired the music videos for the songs "Suddenly Sunday" and "Thirteen Ghosts." SuperStation WTBS also aired the music video "Suddenly Sunday" on their show "Night Tracks".

For a brief time, between 1991 and 1993, the band shortened their name to "Overcoat." The band stopped touring in 1996, but re-formed in 2000 to record through 2011. Although the band played its last concert in 2008, many contemporary garage bands have cited The Marshmallow Overcoat as a chief influence.

In addition to nine full-length album releases, singles and vinyl EPs, The Marshmallow Overcoat appear on compilation albums released in the US, UK, Italy, France, Spain, Greece and Germany. Their recordings have received airplay on radio stations in the US and abroad. In 2013, Timothy Gassen ran a successful Kickstarter campaign to release a 30-song "best of" audio collection as a 2-LP colored vinyl set. The band's name, The Marshmallow Overcoat, was inspired by dialog in Martin Scorsese's 1978 film The Last Waltz.

== Members ==
Timothy Gassen is lead vocalist and band leader. Other members include Scot Gassen (drum kit), Dan Magee (bass), Chad White (guitars), Matt Rendon (guitars, bass, drum kit), Bill Kurzenberger (keyboards), and Debra Dickey (keyboards).

== Selected discography ==
=== Albums ===
- The Inner Groove (1987) Dionysus Records (USA)
- Try On... (1988) Skyclad/Get Hip Records (USA)
- Three Chords... And A Cloud Of Dust! (1991) Dionysus Records (USA)
- Fuzz, Screams & Tambourines! (1991) Kinetic Vibes Records (France)
- A Touch Of Evil (1993) Music Maniac Records (Germany)
- All You Need Is Fuzz (1993) Collectables Records (USA)
- The Baroque Sounds Of (1995) Misty Lane (Italy)
- Marshmallow Overcoat (1996) 360 Twist! Records (USA)
- The Light Show (2008) Purple Cactus Media Productions (USA)
- Goodnight.Goodbye. (2009) Purple Cactus Media Productions (USA)
- The Complete Sound (2011) Garage Nation Records (USA)
- The Very Best Of (2014) Garage Nation Records (USA)

=== Singles ===
- Groovy Little Trip b/w Stop It Baby 7" (Dionysus Records) 1986 (USA)
- Suddenly Sunday b/w Tomorrow Never Knows 7" (Skyclad/Get Hip Records) 1988 (USA)
- Season Of The Witch b/w 1000 Years Ago 7" (Face Records) 1991 (Italy)
- Fly Away b/w Can't Stop Thee Hands Of Tyme 7" (Sound Effect) 2005 (Greece)

=== EPs ===
- Alive (Dionysus Records) 1989 (USA)
- Beverly Pepper (Skyclad/Get Hip Records) 1990 (USA)
- Psilocybic Mind (Psych-Out Records) 2003 (Italy)

=== Contributions ===
- (1987) Raw Cuts Volume Six: American Psych Wars (Satellite Records, UK) - I Can Only Give Your Everything & Psilocybin Explosion
- (1987) Kaleidoscope Presents: The Exploding Underground Compilation (Direct Hit Records, USA) - Suddenly Sunday
- (1989) Here Ain’t The Sonics (Popllama Records, USA) - Maintaining My Cool
- (1990) Ptolemaic Terrascope (Ptolemaic Terrascope Magazine, UK) - Cinderella
- (1991) Psychedelic Psauna (Delerium Records, UK) - 13 Ghosts
- (1991) Ruta 66 (Capote Records, Spain) - Tried To Hide
- (1991) Who Are Them (Face Records, Italy) - The Good's Gone
- (1992) Fun With Mushrooms (Delerium Records, UK) - 13 Ghosts
- (1992) Kinetic Vibes 7” (Kinetic Vibes Magazine, France) - Soapy
- (1992) Abus Dangereaux (Abus Dangereaux Magazine, France) - Inside Tonight
- (1992) Larsen (Larsen Magazine, France) - I Need You
- (1992) Try One Of These (Moxie Records, USA) - Baby You’re Wrong
- (1993) 55 Miles From Mexico (EFA, Germany) - Beverly Pepper
- (1993) A Web Of Mystery (Misty Lane Records, Italy) - 7 & 7 Is
- (1995) For Your Long Hair Party (Aishna Records, Spain) - Bitter Heart
- (1996) Transworld Punk (Misty Lane Records, Italy) - My Flash On You
- (1996) Ochre Sampler (Ochre Records, UK) - A Song For Steven
- (2001) The Knights of Fuzz (Purple Cactus Media Productions, USA) - (We’re The) The Knights of Fuzz
- (2002) Illbilly Records compilation #2 (Illbilly Records, USA) - (We’re The) The Knights of Fuzz
- (2004) Lost in Tyme (Lost In Tyme Fanzine, Greece) - Come Today
- (2004) Garage Bands Revisited (GBR Fanzine, France) - Psilocybic Mind
- (2005) Tribute to the Fuzztones (Sin Records, USA) - Skeleton Farm
- (2005) Ansia De Color compilation (Ansia De Color magazine, Spain) - A House Is Not A Motel
- (2005) Peace Frog compilation (Peace Frog fanzine, Greece) - I Looked At You
- (2006) The Knights of Fuzz: Garage and Psychedelic Music (Purple Cactus Media Productions, USA) - (We’re The) The Knights of Fuzz
- (2014) The Knights of Fuzz (Purple Cactus Media Productions, USA) - (We’re The) The Knights of Fuzz

=== Video ===
- Stop It Baby 1986
- Suddenly Sunday 1988
- 13 Ghosts 1990
- The Mummy 1991
- Bones Crack 1993
- 26 Ghosts 2005
- Psilocybic Mind 2006
