= Come Out Fighting Ghengis Smith =

1967 studio album by Roy Harper

Studio album by Roy Harper
- Released: 1967
- Recorded: England
- Genre: Folk rock, progressive folk, folk baroque
- Length: 45:40
- Label: CBS BPG 63184; Awareness AWCD 1035; Science Friction HUCD006; Science Friction SFLP004
- Producer: Shel Talmy

Roy Harper chronology
| Sophisticated Beggar (1966) | Come Out Fighting Ghengis Smith (1967) | Folkjokeopus (1969) |

Alternative Cover
- 1977 Reissue cover

Reissue Covers
- 1991 Reissue cover

Alternative cover
- 2017 Reissue cover

Professional ratings
Review scores
| Source | Rating |
|---|---|
| Allmusic | link |

Come Out Fighting Ghengis Smith is the second studio album by the English folk musician Roy Harper. Originally released in 1967, the album was re-issued in 1977 as The Early Years, re-issued once more on compact disc in 1991, and was re-released again in December 2017 in both remastered, 180 gram vinyl and CD formats.

== History ==
Columbia Records, recognising Harper's potential, hired American producer Shel Talmy to produce the album. Talmy later claimed that 'Harper was difficult... truculent... we battled. But we got round to it'. The album was orchestrated by Keith Mansfield.

Musically, the album was notable for the 11-minute track "Circle" comprising several movements, "a soundscape of Harper's difficult youth" that, according to Harper, was "totally unlike anything anyone else was doing. The Beatles weren’t doing anything like that at the time. The Stones weren’t doing anything like it, either. No-one was"

Career-wise, the album was notable for establishing a broadening in Harper's musical style away from the more traditional side of contemporary folk music then played. Harper had an interest in traditional folk but did not consider himself a bona fide member of the folk scene. He later explained:-

I was too much of a modernist, really. Just too modern for what was going on in the folk clubs. I wanted to modernise music, but more than that to completely modernise people's attitudes towards life in general. I was involved in trying to bring (more) meat to the (contemporary) folk music...(of the time).

Harper's record company had different expectations. "They wanted me to write commercial pop songs and when they heard the album... they didn’t have a clue. They wanted hits. And I gave them "Circle"". Bert Jansch contributed sleeve notes for the album. The first song on the album is called "Freak Street" on the back cover of the Science Friction CD but is given as "Freak Sweet" in the liner notes; elsewhere it is referred to as "Freak Suite". During this period, Harper was managed by American music entrepreneur Jo Lustig; manager of The Pentangle and former agent to Julie Felix.

== Single ==
The same sessions produced a non-album single (CBS 3371), "Life Goes By", with "You Don't Need Money" on the B-side. The A-side, also produced by Talmy and orchestrated by Mansfield, has never been reissued.

== Re-releases ==
In 1977, the album was re-issued by CBS with different cover art under the title The Early Years. In 1991, the album was re-released again by Awareness Records with new artwork and additional content. The 2017 remastered album removed those 1991 bonus tracks, reverting to the original 1968 tracklist.

The track "You Don't Need Money" appeared on the first bargain priced sampler album, The Rock Machine Turns You On, as "Nobody's Got Any Money In The Summer".

== Track listing ==
All tracks are written by Roy Harper.

Side one
| No. | Title | Length |
|---|---|---|
| 1. | "Freak Street" | 3:06 |
| 2. | "You Don't Need Money" | 2:27 |
| 3. | "Ageing Raver" | 4:11 |
| 4. | "In a Beautiful Rambling Mess" | 2:51 |
| 5. | "All You Need Is" | 5:49 |
| 6. | "What You Have" | 5:16 |

Side two
| No. | Title | Length |
|---|---|---|
| 7. | "Circle" | 10:40 |
| 8. | "Highgate Cemetery" | 2:22 |
| 9. | "Come Out Fighting Ghengis Smith" | 8:58 |

1991 CD reissue bonus tracks
| No. | Title | Length |
|---|---|---|
| 10. | "Zaney Janey" (from the US release of Folkjokeopus) | 3:31 |
| 11. | "Ballad of Songwriter" (from the US release of Folkjokeopus) | 3:10 |
| 12. | "Midspring Dithering" (A-side from the 1967 single) | 2:49 |
| 13. | "Zengem" (A-side from the 1967 single) | 1:37 |
| 14. | "It's Tomorrow And Today Is Yesterday" (John Peel — BBC Radio Show 1970) | 4:11 |
| 15. | "Francesca" (recorded for "Top Gear" at the BBC, 3 June 1969) | 1:32 |
| 16. | "She's the One" (recorded "Top Gear" at the BBC, 3 June 1969) | 4:45 |

== Personnel ==
- Roy Harper – vocals, instruments
- Laurie Allan – additional musician
- Keith Mansfield – additional musician, orchestral arrangements

Technical

- Lippa Pearce – design layout
- Wayne Millar – photography
- Bert Jansch – liner notes
