= Kwyet Kinks =

1965 EP by the Kinks

EP by the Kinks
- Released: 17 September 1965
- Recorded: 16 April – 3 August 1965
- Studio: Pye, London
- Genre: Folk rock
- Length: 9:48
- Label: Pye
- Producer: Shel Talmy

The Kinks EP chronology
Kinksize Hits (1965)	Kwyet Kinks (1965)	Dedicated Kinks (1966)

Kwyet Kinks is the third EP by the English rock band the Kinks. It was released on 17 September 1965 in the United Kingdom by Pye Records. Driven by the inclusion of the song "A Well Respected Man", Kwyet Kinks topped sales charts in Britain for several weeks. In the United States, which had no corresponding market for EPs, Reprise Records instead used its songs as the basis for the November 1965 LP Kinkdom.

With its mostly acoustic sound, Kwyet Kinks represented a departure from the heavier rock for which the Kinks had become known, a change reflected in the title with its play on the word "quiet". Contemporary and retrospective coverage of the EP has typically focused on "A Well Respected Man", which marked a shift in bandleader Ray Davies's songwriting towards social commentary. Ray hoped that the success of Kwyet Kinks would allow for more EPs made up of exclusive material, but Pye's focus on the more popular singles market meant that future Kinks EPs instead collected previously released recordings.

== Background and music ==
The Kinks' singles and LPs from mid-1964 to mid-1965 were characterised by a focus on fast, gritty rhythm and blues and rock and roll. Kwyet Kinks marked a stylistic departure from the Kinks' earlier output by being mostly acoustic in sound, a change reflected in the title through its play on the word "quiet". The music critic Richie Unterberger describes the EP as generally folk rock. In mid-1965, the Kinks recorded all four of its songs at Pye Studios in London. They recorded "Such a Shame" on 16 April, "Wait Till the Summer Comes Along" on 3 May, and both "Don't You Fret" and "A Well Respected Man" on 3 August. Shel Talmy produced the EP and Alan MacKenzie likely engineered.

Dave Davies composed and sang the EP's lead track, "Wait Till the Summer Comes Along", a country-tinged ballad featuring a twelve-string guitar. The song was the first by the Kinks written only by Dave, and his brother Ray Davies composed and sang the EP's remaining three songs. (Note: On the EP's original label, "Wait Till the Summer Comes Along" is erroneously credited to Ray.) Contemporary and subsequent coverage of the EP has typically focused on Ray's song "A Well Respected Man", which signalled his shift in songwriting from basic sentiments about love towards satire and social commentary about contemporary British society. Among band biographers, Johnny Rogan writes that the song "Such a Shame" suggested the Kinks' transition from beat music to folk rock, and Nick Hasted writes that the appeals to comfort, familiarity and domestic life in "Don't You Fret" anticipated Ray's later songwriting.

== Release and reception ==
Pye Records issued Kwyet Kinks in the United Kingdom on 17 September 1965. The release was the band's third EP released in the UK and their second to feature entirely new material, following the previous year's Kinksize Session. The critic Allen Evans reviewed Kwyet Kinks favourably in New Musical Express, writing that the band's softer sound proved as successful as their louder output. "A Well Respected Man" received regular airplay on UK radio stations, driving sales of Kwyet Kinks, which reached number one on both Record Retailer and Record Mirror magazines' EP charts. The EP remained on Record Mirror's chart for 32 weeks.

One of the year's best sellers, Kwyet Kinks's sales exceeded what was typical for an EP at that time. Prompted by the release's unexpected success, Ray promised in interviews that the Kinks would release more EPs satirising unconventional trends and fashions, hoping that the format would prove an ideal medium in developing his songwriting. As Pye's focus remained on the more profitable singles market, the label cancelled all planned EPs of new Kinks material and instead recycled older material on subsequent releases. (Note: The following year's EP, Dedicated Kinks, collected four of the band's most recent A-sides.)

In the United States, where EPs were comparatively uncommon, Reprise Records instead used the songs on Kwyet Kinks as the basis for the US-only LP Kinkdom. Released on 24 November 1965, Kinkdom peaked at number 47 on the Billboard Top LPs chart. In addition, the label issued "A Well Respected Man" as a single on 4 November. Though the band were unable to promote the single's release, it reached number 13 on the Billboard Hot 100 chart. (Note: Due to incidents during the Kinks' first US tour in June and July 1965, the American Federation of Musicians informally blacklisted the band from performing in the United States.) Reflecting on the situation decades later, Rogan characterises the decision by Pye to relegate "A Well Respected Man" to Kwyet Kinks rather than releasing it as a UK single as "[p]robably one of the greatest blunders in the Kinks' career". (Note: Rogan contends that the combination of the EP's success, the song's strong UK radio play and its US chart appearance despite a lack of promotion indicate that the song was a strong contender to reach number one in the UK.)

== Track listing ==
All tracks written by Ray Davies, except "Wait Till the Summer Comes Along" by Dave Davies. Track lengths are from the 2011 Deluxe Edition of Kinda Kinks, and are per AllMusic.

Side one

1. "Wait Till the Summer Comes Along" – 2:08
2. "Such a Shame" – 2:17

Side two

1. "A Well Respected Man" – 2:41
2. "Don't You Fret" – 2:42

== Personnel ==
According to the band researcher Doug Hinman:

The Kinks

- Ray Davies – lead vocal, acoustic guitar; twelve-string guitar ("Wait Till the Summer Comes Along")
- Dave Davies – backing vocal, electric guitar; lead vocal ("Wait Till the Summer Comes Along")
- Pete Quaife – bass guitar
- Mick Avory – drums

Production

- Shel Talmy – producer
- Alan MacKenzie – engineer

== Charts ==
Weekly chart performance for Kwyet Kinks
Chart (1965–66)	Peak position
UK Record Mirror EP chart	1
UK Record Retailer EP chart	1
