= La-La-La-Lies =

Song by The Who

- South African picture sleeve

Single by the Who

from the album My Generation
- B-side: "The Good's Gone"
- Released: 11 November 1966
- Recorded: 12–13 October 1965
- Studio: IBC in Central London
- Length: 2:12
- Label: Brunswick 05968 (UK)
- Songwriter: Pete Townshend
- Producer: Shel Talmy

The Who singles chronology
"I'm a Boy" (1966)	"La-La-La-Lies" (1966)	"Happy Jack" (1966)

"La-La-La-Lies" is the fourth track on the Who's debut studio album My Generation. It was written by lead guitarist Pete Townshend.

== Background ==
Townshend wrote the song during the summer of 1965, and the band recorded it consistently with his home demos. According to Townshend, the song "wasn't as good as this before I did it with Keith [Moon]. It's not my favourite one on the LP. It reminds me a bit of Sandie Shaw." Music journalist, Chris Charlesworth calls the melody "attractive". Charlesworth particularly highlights Moon's unusual drumming, in which Moon uses only his tom-toms during the verses and refrain and incorporates cymbals only for the bridge and the solo. Allmusic critic Richie Unterberger calls it one of the "highlights" of My Generation. But Steve Grantley and Alan G. Parker describe the song as being "so-so" and "pretty conventional". But they too acknowledge the power of Moon's "intermittent controlled" drum patterns and remark that it contains a preview of some elements of later Who songs, such as Townshend's "tentative crash chords". Who biographer John Atkins concurs that the song is rather conventional and describes it as a "straight pop song".

Nicky Hopkins joins the band on piano for the song, and author Mike Segretto claims that his "hyper piano runs contribute much amphetamine fuel to it. Segretto also believes that the "shuffling rhythm" was influenced by Martha and the Vandellas' "Heat Wave". Segretto claims that like "The Kids Are Alright", also from My Generation, "La-La-La-Lies" "transform[s] the romantic song into something defiant", in this case by declaring that his love is strong enough to withstand the "slander of jealous parties".

In common with several songs off My Generation, a theme of "La-La-La-Lies" is the "illusion of identity". Rolling Stone critic Dave Marsh called it "as personal as anything Pete Townshend ever wrote". The lyrics criticize a friend who lies about the singer. This makes the song a little different from other similarly themed Who songs, as in many of the band's songs about lying their complaint is that someone is lying to them; in "La-La-La-Lies" the complaint is that someone is lying about them. Christopher Ketcham sees "La-La-La-Lies" as representing a related theme common to several Who songs: the difficulty of seeing "the other". Ketcham sees this as also being a theme of Quadrophenia and songs such as "My Generation" and "Who Are You".

== Single release ==
In November 1966, the song was released in Britain as the fourth single from the My Generation album without the permission of the Who. This was done by the song's producer Shel Talmy, who owned the rights to the song, in the midst of his legal dispute with the band, in order to compete with the singles the band wanted to release. The single reached the top 20 in Sweden, but did not chart in the United Kingdom. Charlesworth suggests that the song would have performed better on the chart had it not been competing with The Who's own "Happy Jack". It was backed with "The Good's Gone".
