= Kinkdom =

1965 studio album by the Kinks

Studio album by the Kinks
- Released: 24 November 1965
- Recorded: July 1964 – August 1965
- Studio: Pye and IBC, London
- Genre: Rock
- Length: 27:23
- Label: Reprise
- Producer: Shel Talmy

The Kinks US chronology
Kinda Kinks (1965)	Kinkdom (1965)	The Kink Kontroversy (1965)

Singles from Kinkdom
- 1. "A Well Respected Man" / "Such a Shame" Released: 4 November 1965

Professional ratings
Review scores
Source	Rating
AllMusic	3/5 stars
The New Rolling Stone Album Guide	3/5 stars

Kinkdom is a studio album by the English rock band the Kinks. Released in the United States and Canada on 24 November 1965, it was their fourth album issued on Reprise Records. It peaked at number 47 on the Billboard album chart.

The album had no direct analogue outside of the North American market, but instead collected songs from the Kwyet Kinks UK EP, both sides of the "See My Friends" single, the B-sides of several of the band's other singles, a track left off of the US edition of the 1965 album Kinda Kinks and a previously released track. All of its songs were recorded at Pye and IBC Studios in London, between July 1964 and August 1965. Kinkdom was the last US-only studio album released by the Kinks; beginning with The Kink Kontroversy in March 1966, Reprise issued albums identical to the UK versions.

== Track listing ==
All songs by Ray Davies, except as noted.

=== Side one ===
1. "A Well Respected Man" – 2:43
2. "Such a Shame" – 2:19
3. "Wait Till the Summer Comes Along" (Dave Davies) – 2:07
4. "Naggin' Woman" (Lazy Lester) – 2:36
5. "Never Met a Girl Like You Before" – 2:05
6. "See My Friends" – 2:46

=== Side two ===
1. "Who'll Be the Next in Line" – 2:02
2. "Don't You Fret" – 2:45
3. "I Need You" – 2:26
4. "It's Alright" – 2:37
5. "Louie Louie" (Richard Berry) – 2:57

== Personnel ==
According to band biographer Doug Hinman:

The Kinks

- Ray Davies – lead vocals, rhythm guitar; harmonica ("It's Alright"); piano (possibly "Louie Louie"); acoustic twelve-string guitar ("Wait Till the Summer Comes Along" and "See My Friends")
- Dave Davies – backing vocals, lead guitar; doubled rhythm guitar ("I Need You"); lead vocal ("Wait Till the Summer Comes Along" and "Naggin' Woman")
- Pete Quaife – backing vocals, bass guitar
- Mick Avory – drums; tambourine ("It's Alright")

Additional musicians

- Rasa Davies – backing vocals ("I Need You")
- Perry Ford – piano (possibly "Louie Louie")
- Bobby Graham – drums ("It's Alright")
- Arthur Greenslade – piano ("It's Alright")
- Jimmy Page – guitar feedback ("I Need You")

Production

- Bob Auger – engineering
- Alan MacKenzie – engineering
- Shel Talmy – producer

== Charts ==
Weekly chart performance
Chart (1965–66)	Peak position
US Billboard Top LPs	47
US Cash Box Top 100 Albums	43
US Record World 100 Top LPs	43

Year-end chart performance
Chart (1966)	Ranking
US Billboard	97
