= A Legal Matter =

Song by The Who

- Dutch picture sleeve

Single by the Who

from the album My Generation
- B-side: "Instant Party" (UK)
- Released: 7 March 1966
- Recorded: 12–13 October 1965
- Studio: IBC, London
- Genre: Rock; R&B
- Length: 2:54
- Label: Brunswick (UK)
- Songwriter: Pete Townshend
- Producer: Shel Talmy

The Who singles chronology
"Substitute" (1966)	"A Legal Matter" (1966)	"The Kids Are Alright" (1966)

"A Legal Matter" is a song written by Pete Townshend and recorded by the English rock band the Who for their debut album My Generation. It was recorded on 12 October 1965 at IBC Studios, and released both as the B-side to "The Kids Are Alright" in the U.S., and as the A-side of a single that reached number 32 in the UK. Both singles were released by Shel Talmy without the permission of the Who and were a result of a legal dispute between Talmy and the band at the time and an attempt to sabotage the release of the band's chosen single "Substitute".

== Composition ==
The subject of the song is fear of commitment and it marks the first time Townshend sang lead vocals, rather than Roger Daltrey, possibly because the song was too close to home for Daltrey who was divorcing his wife at the time. Who biographer John Atkins describes Townshend's voice on the song as being higher and less abrasive than Daltrey's. But Rolling Stone critic Dave Marsh thinks that although the vocal has some charm, it does not suggest that Townshend's voice would be good enough to be the band's full-time lead singer. Author Mike Segretto describes the vocal as a "noncommercial adenoidal croon". According to Allmusic critic Stewart Mason, "adenoidal whine actually makes the singer sound like he's sneaking out in the dead of night, scared to death that his wife's going to catch him."

Atkins describes the three-note guitar figure used in the introduction to the song as being "memorable and catchy". He states that the song incorporates a "short, jolting rhythm" similar to that on their more famous song "My Generation". Steve Grantley and Alan G. Parker state that "the band sound like they have been let off the leash and really let rip to create another early classic". Segretto describes the melody as being "excellent". Nicky Hopkins joins the band on piano, and Segretto claims that his "hyper piano runs contribute much amphetamine fuel to the song".

Atkins also notes the "ironic humour" of the song. Mason also finds the song "funny". Segretto points out that the lyrics are surprisingly sexist coming from Townshend but that is softened by the "playful tone and cute lines like 'Just wanna keep on doing all the dirty little things I do". According to Townshend, the song "is about a guy on the run from a chick about to pin him down for breach of contract. What this song was screaming from behind lines like 'It's a legal matter, baby, marrying's no fun/It's a legal matter, baby, you got me on the run' was, "I'm lonely, I'm hungry, the bed needs making'. I wanted a maid, I suppose". Marsh suggests that the protagonist really doesn't want to marry because "he's terrified of discovering who he really is (boring, middle-class and conventional)".

== Reception ==
Several commentators noted an influence from the Rolling Stones on this song, particularly their song "The Last Time". For example, Segretto states "A Legal Matter" has "a nagging, droning riff that may share DNA with 'The Last Time.'" Mason states that the song "proves conclusively that Pete Townshend was working on a different plane than just about every other songwriter in London in 1965."

== Charts ==
Weekly chart performance for "A Legal Matter"
Chart (1966)	Peak position
Australia (Kent Music Report)	83
Netherlands (Veronica Top 40)	22
Netherlands (Single Top 100)	20
UK (Disc and Music Echo)	34
UK (Melody Maker)	32
UK (Record Retailer)	32

== Sources ==
- Atkins, John (2000). The Who on Record: A Critical History (1st ed.). United States: McFarland & Company. ISBN 0-7864-0609-7 – via Internet Archive.
- Charlesworth, Chris (1995). The Complete Guide to the Music of the Who. United Kingdom: Omnibus Press. ISBN 0-7119-4306-0 – via Internet Archive.
- Grantley, Steve; Parker, Alan G. (2010). The Who by Numbers. United Kingdom: Helter Skelter Publishing. ISBN 978-190-513-926-2.
- Kent, David (2005). Australian Chart Book 1940–1969. Australia: Australian Chart Book. ISBN 0-646-44439-5.
- Marsh, Dave (1983). Before I Get Old: the Story of the Who. United States: St. Martin's Press. ISBN 0-312-07155-8 – via Internet Archive.
- Segretto, Mike (2014). The Who FAQ: All That's Left to Know About Fifty Years of Maximum. United Kingdom: Backbeat Books. ISBN 978-1-480-3610-34.
