= Anyway, Anyhow, Anywhere =

Single by the Who
- B-side: "Daddy Rolling Stone" (UK); "Anytime You Want Me" (US)
- Released: 21 May 1965 (UK); 5 June 1965 (US)
- Recorded: 13–14 April 1965
- Studio: IBC, London
- Genre: Rock; power pop
- Length: 2:41
- Label: Brunswick (UK); Decca (US)
- Songwriters: Roger Daltrey; Pete Townshend
- Producer: Shel Talmy

The Who singles chronology
"I Can't Explain" (1964)	"Anyway, Anyhow, Anywhere" (1965)	"My Generation" (1965)

"Anyway, Anyhow, Anywhere" is the second single released by the English rock band the Who in 1965. It features call-and-response lyrics (especially common in Who lyrics at this time) and some of the first ever recorded guitar feedback. The song was composed by lead vocalist Roger Daltrey and guitarist Pete Townshend, the only time they wrote together. The guitar feedback, although not the first to be heard on a record (see the Beatles' "I Feel Fine"), is thought to be the first solo with feedback. This is the first Who release with Nicky Hopkins playing piano.

== Overview ==
=== Composition ===
"Anyway, Anyhow, Anywhere" has a significant similarity to "Out in the Street", which appears on their debut album, My Generation. Both songs feature a three-chord strum before "blasting into an uptempo rhythm"; despite this, "Out in the Street" is a marginally older song, and both tracks originate from the same recording sessions between 13 and 14 April 1965. The use of feedback throughout the song was crucial, according to Townshend, who stated that the group "were trying to achieve the sound which we get on the stage at present, all in a commercial song that will sell." He would later claim that "Anyway, Anyhow, Anywhere" was an attempt to write a very spiritual song.

Roger Daltrey helped a lot with the final arrangement and got half the credit. Something he does today for nothing, bless him. I was lying on my mattress on the floor listening to a Charlie Parker record when I thought up the title. (It's usually title first with me.) I just felt the guy was so free when he was playing. He was a soul without a body, riding, flying, on music. Listening to the compulsory Dizzy Gillespie solo after one by Bird was always a come-down, however clever Gillespie was. No one could follow Bird. Jimi Hendrix must have been his reincarnation, especially for guitar players. The freedom suggested by the title came restricted by the aggression of our tightly-defined image when I came to write the words. In fact, Daltrey was really a hard nut then, and he changes quite a few words himself to toughen the song up to suit his temperament. It is the most excitingly pig-headed of our songs. It's blatant, proud and, dare I say it, sassy.

— Pete Townshend, Meaty Beaty Big and Bouncy liner notes by Brian Cady.

Brett Milano of udiscovermusic.com rated Townsend's guitar solo as one of the 100 all-time greatest, "cramming all kinds of great noises – guitar feedback, air-raid sirens, and good old guitar destruction – into the brief space he had."

=== Release ===
"Anyway, Anyhow, Anywhere" was released on 21 May 1965. The release coincided with an appearance on Ready Steady Go! by the group, in which they perform this and "Shout and Shimmy". "Anyway, Anyhow, Anywhere" fitted the mood of Ready Steady Go! so well that the show adapted it as their intro for a while. In the USA, the feedback present in the recording startled Decca Records, who believed they'd received a faulty tape of the song. The song was released on 5 June 1965 in the USA.

The single became the Who's second top-ten single after "I Can't Explain", reaching number ten on the UK Singles Chart. It remained in the top forty for eleven weeks, with six weeks in the top twenty, and one in the top ten. It also became a top forty single in France, reaching number thirty-eight, but it failed to match the success that "I Can't Explain" had in the US: whereas that was a top-hundred hit (peaking at 93), "Anyway, Anyhow, Anywhere" failed to chart on the Billboard Hot 100. It sold approximately 88,000 copies in the UK.

Cash Box felt that the "middle instrumental section is a wow."

The song was rarely played live for most of the Who's career past 1965, but since 1999 has become a staple for their live shows; it appears on the album Live at the Royal Albert Hall. It can also be found on BBC Sessions and The Kids Are Alright.

== B-sides ==
When first released in the UK, "Anyway, Anyhow, Anywhere" featured the B-side "Daddy Rolling Stone", a cover of blues-singer Otis Blackwell's debut B-side from 1953. Upon release in the USA on 5 June 1965, it was replaced by a cover of the Garnet Mimms ballad "Anytime You Want Me". Both songs were included on the 2002 reissue of My Generation.

== Personnel ==
The Who

- Roger Daltrey – lead vocals
- Pete Townshend – electric guitar, backing vocals
- John Entwistle – bass guitar, backing vocals
- Keith Moon – drums

Additional musician

- Nicky Hopkins – piano

== Other versions ==
David Bowie recorded a version of this song for his Pin Ups album in 1973.

The Flaming Lips recorded a version of this song which appeared on a Mojo magazine CD of Who covers called Mojo: The Who Covered.

A version of this song has also been recorded by Ocean Colour Scene for the Who tribute album Substitute – The Songs of The Who.
