= A Well Respected Man =

- Dutch picture sleeve

Single by the Kinks
- B-side: "Such a Shame"
- Released: 17 September 1965 (UK Kwyet Kinks EP); 4 November 1965 (US single)
- Recorded: 3 August 1965
- Studio: Pye, London
- Genre: Pop; rock; folk rock; music hall
- Length: 2:41
- Label: Pye (UK); Reprise (US)
- Songwriter: Ray Davies
- Producer: Shel Talmy

The Kinks US singles chronology
"See My Friends" (1965)	"A Well Respected Man" (1965)	"Till the End of the Day" (1966)

"A Well Respected Man" is a song by the English rock band the Kinks, written by the group's lead singer and rhythm guitarist Ray Davies, and originally released in the United Kingdom on the EP Kwyet Kinks in September 1965. It was also released as a single in the US and Continental Europe.

Written as a satire on the British upper class, the song was inspired by Ray Davies's interest in music hall and scorn for wealthy tourists he encountered on a 1965 vacation. The song served as an important step for the band in pivoting from raucous rock and roll to Anglocentric character studies. The song has since become one of the Kinks' most successful and best remembered, with critics singling out the song for its influence and lyrical wit.

== Background ==
Ray Davies composed the song based on a negative experience at a luxury resort in 1965. After a disappointing American tour, Ray was sent by Kinks managers Grenville Collins and Robert Wace to a resort in Torquay, where upper-class guests, who knew of his musical career, tried to coax him into joining them for a golf game. Ray recalled:

They tried to make me one of them saying, "Come on, play golf with me." I took an instant dislike to them because the establishment draws you in and makes you one of them and that's as far as you can go. You can't break out. People like (John) Lennon realized that.

The encounter prompted Ray to "use words more, and say things" with his songwriting. He described it as "the first time [he] actually stood back from what [he] was", a marked departure from the "boy-girl teenage angst" that had motivated his earlier songwriting. "A Well Respected Man" was then written as a reflection of this experience, while also utilizing the mannerisms of the upper-class Collins and Wace.

The song also includes the word "fag", interpreted by Americans as a reference to homosexuality. However, Davies later said that this was not intended:

I had naively meant a fag to either be slang for a cigarette or, at worst, that the well-respected man had been at public school, where [he performed] the most humiliating tasks.

== Music and lyrics ==
Musically, it marked the beginning of an expansion in the Kinks' inspirations, drawing much from British music hall traditions (a style which was to feature prominently on later 1960s songs such as "Dedicated Follower of Fashion" and "Mister Pleasant"). Ray commented on the influence of music hall on the song, "For years and years, I denied it. ... I think that's because music hall is, in rock and roll terms, quite an uncool thing to be associated with. ... Whereas the blues is. But music hall was undeniably an important influence". Ray cited George Formby as an influence, while Dave Davies commented, "I don't think Ray would have written 'Well Respected Man' without Robert [Wace] showing him Noël Coward".

Ray also sings the song in his pronounced British accent; he commented, "While lots of bands sang in American accents, we were singing in London accents". The song was a more laboured track than previous Kinks tracks, with Pete Quaife commenting, "I remember trying to stay awake making 'Well Respected Man'. It was so boring. I had no input whatsoever".

Lyrically, the song is notable as being the first of Ray Davies' compositions to overtly address the theme of British class consciousness. Indeed, the song offers a satirical commentary on the entrenched mores and conventions of the English upper and middle classes, while hinting at the frustration and casual hypocrisy that underlie this fastidiously maintained veneer of respectability.

== Release ==
Probably one of the greatest blunders in the Kinks' career was the failure to release ["A Well Respected Man"] as a single [in the UK]. The sales of [Kwyet Kinks] and the radio exposure received by the song, even in competition with "Till the End of the Day", suggest most forcibly that it would have been a pre-Christmas number 1.

— Johnny Rogan, 1984

Pye refused to release "A Well Respected Man" as a single in the UK because the record company wanted a song more similar to the band's raunchier previous hits. As a compromise, the song was released on the EP Kwyet Kinks, which turned into a surprise hit by reaching number one on the EP charts. Ray considered releasing more EPs in the satirical vein of "A Well Respected Man" following the success, but ultimately decided not to given the other commitments the band had.

On the back of the success of Kwyet Kinks in the UK, Reprise Records, the band's American label, released as the song as a single in the United States during October of that same year. It reached number 13. It was also released on the album Kinkdom in the United States. Following the success of "Dedicated Follower of Fashion", "A Well Respected Man" was also released as a single in mainland Europe in March 1966 (although pressed in the UK, it was an export-only issue).

The song has also appeared in the band's live setlist, where the band would occasionally lead the crowd in a sing-along of the song's chorus. During the 1970s, the song was sometimes performed in a medley with "Death of a Clown" and "Sunny Afternoon".

== Critical reception ==
Cash Box described it as a "very catchy folkish number with a message lyric". Record World described it as a "jaunty and yet bitter song about conformity" that is one of the Kinks' best songs.

Retrospective writers have been similarly effusive in their praise of the song, with many naming it one of the band's best and most influential songs. GQ stated of the song, "You can feel the venom and how undeniably accurate it is in portraying a certain type of man that is still on the same train every time in 2020". The Independent wrote, "It was the first of many acutely observed character studies, and offered hints of the music hall influence that would permeate Ray’s future work".

"A Well Respected Man" remains one of the band's most popular and best known songs. It is one of four Kinks songs included on The Rock and Roll Hall of Fame's list of the 500 Songs That Shaped Rock and Roll along with "You Really Got Me", "Waterloo Sunset", and "Lola".

== Personnel ==
According to band researcher Doug Hinman:

- Ray Davies – lead vocals, acoustic guitar
- Dave Davies – electric guitar, backing vocals
- Pete Quaife – bass
- Mick Avory – drums

== Charts ==
Chart (1965–1966)	Peak position
Australia (Kent Music Report)	11
Belgium (Ultratop 50 Flanders)	20
Belgium (Ultratop 50 Wallonia)	36
Canada (CHUM)	4
France (IFOP)	20
Malaysia	8
Netherlands (Dutch Top 40)	8
Netherlands (Single Top 100)	6
Singapore	3
South Africa (Springbok Radio)	7
Sweden (Kvällstoppen)	5
Sweden (Tio i Topp)	1
US Billboard Hot 100	13
US Cash Box Top 100	9
