= The Ox (instrumental) =

Instrumental composed by John Entwistle, Nicky Hopkins, Keith Moon, Pete Townshend

Instrumental by The Who

from the album My Generation
- Released: 3 December 1965
- Recorded: 12 November 1965
- Studio: IBC Studios (London)
- Genre: Hard rock; instrumental rock; surf rock
- Length: 3:50
- Songwriters: Pete Townshend; John Entwistle; Keith Moon; Nicky Hopkins
- Producer: Shel Talmy

Official audio
- "The Ox" on YouTube

"The Ox" is an instrumental song by the English rock band the Who. It was on their debut studio album, My Generation (1965). The tune was improvised by Pete Townshend, John Entwistle, Keith Moon and keyboardist Nicky Hopkins. This track appears as the B-side of "The Kids Are Alright" on the single's UK release. The tune was also on the compilation album Thirty Years of Maximum R&B (1994). A jingle based on this tune was released as "Top Gear" on both reissues of The Who Sell Out (1967). It is the oldest known recorded track by the Who. The title is a nickname given to Entwistle by the band, because of his strong constitution and seeming ability to "eat, drink or do more than the rest of them".

The song was very rarely played live by the Who. The only known live appearance of this song was in a medley of "My Generation" at the Concertgebouw in Amsterdam, Netherlands, on 29 September 1969, part of the Tommy Tour.

Rolling Stone's John Swenson described "The Ox" and "My Generation" to be "sonic marvels of the time" due to Townshend's feedback technique on these songs. Music journalist Phil Smee has placed the song in his list of top 50 freakbeat tracks; a retrospective label describing intense and raw music in the transition from British beat to psychedelia.
