= Folkjokeopus =

Studio album by Roy Harper
- Released: 5 June 1969
- Recorded: England
- Genre: Folk, progressive folk, folk baroque
- Length: 47:57
- Label: Liberty LBS 83231 (UK) / World Pacific WPS 21888 (US); Science Friction HUCD009
- Producer: Shel Talmy

Roy Harper chronology
| Come Out Fighting Ghengis Smith (1968) | Folkjokeopus (1969) | Flat Baroque and Berserk (1970) |

Folkjokeopus is the third studio album by the English folk musician Roy Harper. It was produced by Shel Talmy and was first released in 1969 by Liberty Records.

== History ==
The album is notable for the lengthy track "McGoohan's Blues", which Harper states was "inspired by actor Patrick McGoohan's depiction of the establishment rebel in his TV series, The Prisoner". An extended, Dylanesque strophic form accompanied only by Harper's guitar ("how the sea she roars with laughter/And howls with the dancing wind/To see my two feet standing here/questioning") suddenly segues, after over ten minutes, first into a brief, new and quieter theme and then into a full-band coda. Its opening line, "Nicky my child he stands there with the wind in his hair" refers to Roy's son Nick Harper (born 1965), who would grow up to be a guitarist and singer-songwriter in his own right and regularly work with his father on record and in concert.

The searing falsetto of "She's the One" makes for one of Harper's most intense and moving recordings as manic guitar-strumming accompanies his scornful upbraiding of an acquaintance for his self-pitying insensitivity to a "wonderful wife" whom the singer sees and apparently loves as "a very beautiful young woman". Like "McGoohan's Blues", this track seems to merge two related but distinct songs.

"One for All" was dedicated to tenor saxophonist Albert Ayler, whom Harper had known in Copenhagen. It includes a lengthy acoustic guitar solo. "Exercising Some Control" and "Manana" may be numbered among Harper's light-hearted crowd-pleasing songs, while "In the Time of Water" and the Incredible String Bandish "Composer of Life" are more experimental, the former featuring the sound of water and Harper's sitar. The opening "Sergeant Sunshine" features the voice of Jane Scrivener while other contributing musicians include Nicky Hopkins, Ron Geesin, "Russ" on bass guitar and drummer Clem Cattini. The American release swaps in two tracks, "Zaney Janey" and "Ballad of Songwriter", for the original UK album's track, "One for All".

The album title, along with the title of the Skip Spence record, was borrowed to provide the name of a Minneapolis record store, Oar Folkjokeopus.

== Reception ==
Professional ratings
Review scores
| Source | Rating |
|---|---|
| Allmusic | 2.5/5 stars |

Richie Unterberger reviewing for Allmusic 40 years later noted "influences such as Bob Dylan, Bert Jansch, Donovan, and possibly Al Stewart" and praised Harper's "uniformly excellent" guitar work but criticised Folkjokeopus for being "sprawling and unwieldy".

== Track listing ==
All songs written by Roy Harper

Side one
| No. | Title | Length |
|---|---|---|
| 1. | "Sgt. Sunshine" | 3:04 |
| 2. | "She's the One" | 6:55 |
| 3. | "In the Time of Water" | 2:16 |
| 4. | "Composer of Life" | 2:26 |
| 5. | "One for All" | 8:11 |

Side two
| No. | Title | Length |
|---|---|---|
| 6. | "Exercising Some Control" | 2:50 |
| 7. | "McGoohan's Blues" | 17:55 |
| 8. | "Manana" | 4:20 |

The United States pressing on World Pacific replaces One For All with two other songs - Zaney Janey and Ballad of a songwriter.

== Personnel ==
- Roy Harper – vocals, acoustic guitar
- Jane Scrivener – additional vocals
- "Russ" – bass guitar
- Nicky Hopkins – piano
- Clem Cattini – drums, percussion
- Ron Geesin – arrangements

Technical Personnel

- Woody Woodward – art direction
- Ray Stevenson – photography
