= The Good's Gone =

- 1966 single B-side

Single by the Who

from the album My Generation
- A-side: "La-La-La-Lies"
- Released: 11 November 1966
- Recorded: 10 November 1965
- Studio: IBC, London
- Genre: Garage rock; proto-punk
- Length: 4:02
- Label: Brunswick
- Songwriter: Pete Townshend
- Producer: Shel Talmy

The Who singles chronology
"I'm a Boy" (1966)	"La-La-La-Lies" / "The Good's Gone" (1966)	"Happy Jack" (1966)

"The Good's Gone" is a song by the English rock band the Who, written by their guitarist Pete Townshend. Initially recorded and sequenced as the third track of their debut My Generation in December 1965, it was released as the B-side to "La-La-La-Lies" in November 1966. Heavily inspired by Ray Davies song "See My Friends", Townshend wrote the track with blues in mind.

The song is notable for its unusual chord progression and ambiguous lyrics. Generally perceived as an underrated and overlooked song in the Who's catalogue, "The Good's Gone" was generally positively reviewed by critics and audiences, with many noting the guitar sound on the track, however, lead singer Roger Daltrey's vocal performance has received mixed response.

== Background and composition ==
The idea of "The Good's Gone" initially came from the Kinks' song "See My Friends", which was written by Ray Davies and released as a single during the summer of 1965. The song features heavy droning on the guitar, supposedly to give it a more Indian sound. Townshend believed that this was far more influential than anything the Beatles similarly made. In his own words, "See My Friends" "was the first reasonable use of the drone." Therefore, on the song, he tried to replicate this effect. According to Mike Segretto, lead singer Roger Daltrey was uncomfortable with singing pop songs, and that the song was written with a more "bluesy" tone in mind. As with most of his compositions of the era, work on the song began after their April 1965 recording sessions, and the song was often demoed by the group before it was recorded. Segretto states that in contrast with many other of their songs from the era, it has a much heavier and heavier sound. John Atkins states that thanks to this it saves the pace on My Generation from the prior song "I Don't Mind".

This song begins with Pete Townshend playing the highest notes of the Bm7 chord on his Rickenbacker guitar. The verses have that chord played, followed by three consecutive A5 chords and another Bm7 chord, and the choruses have A5 played twice followed by B5. According to Atkins, the "arpeggio guitar figure" is extremely unusual compared to other songs. He also notes the dramatic chord changes on the song. Bob Carruthers states that the guitar lick runs through the entire song, albeit with minor differences. Segretto writes that it captures "the early Who's thuggish menace", stating that it is a "snarling threat." He also writes that lyrically, it's an undoubtedly breakup song, and also states that it presents the listener with a rather nihilistic approach to the subject. However, Atkins suggests that it is actually about persuasion, with lyrics that indicate an earlier relationship. It was recorded on 10 November 1965 at IBC Studios in one of the last studio sessions for My Generation, something most likely attributed to its complexity. Daltrey's vocals on the song were double-tracked.

== Release and reception ==
"The Good's Gone" appeared on the Who's debut album My Generation, released on 3 December 1965. It is sequenced as the third track, and is the second original composition on the album, and is also the longest song on it, clocking in at 4 minutes and 2 seconds.

The song received positive reviews upon the release of My Generation. In a review for Melody Maker, the song is described as eerie, thanks to Daltrey's "evil" voice on it. Writing for New Musical Express, music reviewer Derek Johnson states that the song is a "more strident and earthy approach" than "La-La-La-Lies", but that it potentially can put a mark on the group's reputation, and that it is not clear whether or not it would become a hit. In her review of the single, Penny Valentine of Disc & Music Echo states that the song along with the A-side are "not representative of their sound now", but that she liked it. Townshend has also put the song in his favour, stating in a Record Mirror interview: "One of mine. I like it. Roger sounds as though he's about six feet tall when he's singing." Drummer Keith Moon also liked the song.

Retrospectively, the song has also received good reviews. In a review of My Generation, music critic Richie Unterberger of AllMusic puts "The Good's Gone" as a highlight. Dave Lifton of Ultimate Classic Rock states that it could have been left out off the album in place of an rhythm and blues cover such as "Heat Wave". Bryan Wawzenek put the song at 81 on his list of the Who songs ranked, writing that the song was threatening, though that there existed more aggressive songs by them around the same era. Philip Martin of Arkansas Democrat-Gazette writes that the song has an "adenoidal flattish droning" and called it a "minor mod anthem".

Although Daltrey's vocals have been praised by Townshend, and multiple other critics, opinions on his performance has varied. Carruthers states his voice resembles a tuba, and that his phrasing of certain words is "atrocious". He does, however state that the lyrics do not improve the situation and that he is in key, which he was not on "I Don't Mind". Rob Chapman states that the vocals are delivered in a "flat, artless sneer", but recognizes that this is due to the song not being in a comfortable vocal range for him. However, Atkins state that his voice is "suitably malevolent" which together with bassist John Entwistle and Townshend's backing vocals gives the song "an extra dimension of emotional charge". Segretto believes that his vocal work on the song is "guttural and chilling". Philip Martin similarly stated that his vocals were of "husky soul", as does Bryan Wawzenek, who compared the vocals to growling.

== Personnel ==
- Roger Daltrey – double tracked lead vocals
- Pete Townshend – double tracked lead guitar, backing vocals
- John Entwistle – bass guitar, backing vocals
- Keith Moon – drums

== Covers ==
- The Marshmallow Overcoat recorded a cover on their album Three Chords... And A Cloud Of Dust! in 1991, which AllMusic critic Bruce Eder considered one of their best songs.
