= Substitute (The Who song) =

Original song written and composed by Pete Townshend

- Italian picture sleeve

Single by the Who
- B-side: "Circles (Instant Party)" (UK); "Waltz for a Pig" (UK & US)
- Released: 4 March 1966
- Recorded: 12 February 1966
- Studio: Olympic, London
- Genre: Power pop; hard rock
- Length: 3:47 (UK): 2:59 (US)
- Label: Reaction (UK); Atco (US)
- Songwriter: Pete Townshend
- Producer: Pete Townshend

The Who singles chronology
"My Generation" (1965)	"Substitute" (1966)	"A Legal Matter" (1966)

Audio sample
- "Substitute": file; help

"Substitute" is a song by the English rock band the Who, written by Pete Townshend. Released in March 1966, the single reached number five in the UK and was later included on the compilation album Meaty Beaty Big and Bouncy in 1971. In 2006, Pitchfork ranked "Substitute" at number 91 on the "200 Greatest Songs of the 1960s".

== Inspiration and writing ==
"Substitute" was primarily inspired by the 1965 soul single "The Tracks of My Tears" by Smokey Robinson and the Miracles. Pete Townshend became obsessed, particularly, with the line, "Although she may be cute/She's just a substitute." This had then led Townshend "to celebrate the word with a song all of its own." For the main guitar riff in the verses, Townshend took inspiration from the song "Where Is My Girl", by Robb Storme & The Whispers, which was one of the singles he was asked to review for the New Musical Express in November 1965.

For the American single, released in April 1966, a different vocal take was used that changed the line in the chorus, "I look all white but my dad was black", to "I try walking forward but my feet walk back." The complete second verse and chorus were also edited from the US release, reducing the track's length to two minutes and fifty-nine seconds.

== Reception ==
Cashbox described the song as a "pulsating, fast-moving blues-drenched woeser which concerns a guy who’s miserable ’cause he’s only a stand-in for the fella his girl really wants". Record World wrote it "has gritty folknroll sound".

In 2012, Paste ranked the song number 13 on its list of the 20 greatest the Who songs, and in 2022, Rolling Stone ranked the song number 11 on its list of the 50 greatest the Who songs.

== Performance history ==
The song remains a familiar fan-favourite and was performed at most of their concerts. "Substitute", along with "I Can't Explain", have served as the group's opening numbers since 1971. It appears on the Live at Leeds album, as well as Live at the Isle of Wight Festival 1970.

On the album Live at Leeds, Townshend comments on the song by saying

We'd like to play three hit singles from our past for ya. Three selected hit singles, the three easiest. There's "Substitute," which we like. [crowd cheers] Thank you. That was our first number four [crowd laughs]...

== Personnel ==
- Roger Daltrey – lead and backing vocals
- Pete Townshend – acoustic guitar, electric guitar, backing vocals
- John Entwistle – bass guitar, backing vocals
- Keith Moon – drums, percussion

== Chart performance ==
=== Weekly charts ===
Chart (1966)	Peak position
Belgium (Ultratop 50 Flanders)	17
Finland (Soumen Virallinen)	29
Italy (Musica e dischi)	99
Netherlands (Dutch Top 40)	3
Netherlands (Single Top 100)	2
New Zealand (Listener)	3
UK Singles (Official Charts)	5
West Germany (GfK)	13

Chart (1976)	Peak position
UK Singles (Official Charts Company)	7

=== Year-end charts ===
Chart (1966)	Rank
Netherlands (Dutch Top 40)	35
