= My Generation (album) =

Studio album by the Who
- Released: 3 December 1965
- Recorded: 12 April – 12 November 1965
- Studios: IBC, London
- Genres: Mod pop; garage rock; R&B; power pop; proto-punk
- Length: 35:59
- Labels: Brunswick (UK); Decca (US)
- Producer: Shel Talmy

The Who chronology
My Generation (1965)	Ready Steady Who (1966)

The Who US chronology
The Who Sings My Generation (1966)	Happy Jack (1967)

Singles from My Generation
- 1. "My Generation" Released: 29 October 1965; 2. "A Legal Matter" Released: 7 March 1966; 3. "The Kids Are Alright" Released: July 1966 (US); 4. "La-La-La-Lies" Released: 11 November 1966

Alternative cover
- The Who Sings My Generation

My Generation is the debut studio album by the English rock band the Who, released on 3 December 1965 by Brunswick Records in the United Kingdom, and Festival Records in Australia. In the United States, it was released on 25 April 1966 by Decca Records as The Who Sings My Generation, with a different cover and a slightly altered track listing. Besides the members of the Who, being Roger Daltrey (vocals), Pete Townshend (guitar), John Entwistle (bass) and Keith Moon (drums), the album features contributions by session musician Nicky Hopkins (piano).

The majority of the album was recorded on the heels of the charting singles "I Can't Explain" and "My Generation", and it was later dismissed by the band as something of a rush job that did not accurately represent their stage performance of the time. While it did not sell as well as later albums, peaking at No. 5 on the UK charts and failing to chart in the US, critics have since retrospectively rated it as one of the best rock albums of all time, especially noting its hard sound unusual for the time, and presaging various hard rock styles such as punk and heavy metal.

In 2008, it was inducted into National Recording Registry, becoming the first, and as of 2025 the only, Who recording to be inducted in the Registry.

== Recording and songs ==
By 1965, the Who were all set after recruiting drummer Keith Moon, and saw their former band name change from the Detours to the Who, after briefly being called the High Numbers. In the spring of 1965, the album was started during the Who's early "Maximum R&B" period and features cover versions of the popular R&B songs "I Don't Mind" and "Please, Please, Please", both originally by James Brown, in addition to the R&B leanings of the tracks written by the band's guitarist Pete Townshend. Nine tracks were recorded, but several of them were rejected for Townshend originals made at new sessions that began in October.

According to the booklet in the Deluxe Edition, "I'm a Man" was eliminated from the US release due to its sexual content. The US album also used the edited UK single version of "The Kids Are Alright", which cut a brief instrumental section laden with manic drum rolls and guitar feedback before the final verse.

Many of the songs on the album saw release as singles. Aside from "My Generation", which preceded the album's release and reached No. 2 on the UK Singles Chart, "A Legal Matter", "La-La-La Lies", and "The Kids Are Alright" were also released as domestic singles by Brunswick after the band had started releasing new material on the Reaction label in 1966. As they were not promoted by the band, they were not as commercially successful as "My Generation" or the Reaction singles. "The Kids Are Alright" was however a top 10 single in Sweden, peaking at No. 8.

"My Generation" and "The Kids Are Alright" in particular remain two of the group's most-covered songs; while "My Generation" is a raw, aggressive number that presaged the heavy metal and punk rock movements, "The Kids Are Alright" is a more sophisticated pop number, with chiming guitars, three-part harmonies, and a lilting vocal melody, though still retaining the driving rhythm of other Who songs of the period. The album is considered an important forerunner of the "power pop" movement. "Circles" was notably covered by contemporaries of the group, British freakbeat outfit Les Fleur de Lys. The cover version has found some notice after its inclusion on Nuggets II: Original Artyfacts from the British Empire and Beyond, 1964–1969.

== Release history ==
The UK release featured a cover image of the band standing beside some oil drums and looking upward to the camera, with splashes of colour added by the red and blue stencilled letters of the title and a jacket patterned after the Union Jack thrown over John Entwistle's shoulders. Pete Townshend was wearing his school scarf. For the US release, this was replaced with a portrait of the band standing beneath Big Ben.

In 1974, The Who Sings My Generation was re-issued by MCA Records in the US and Canada as part of a budget-priced double album set which also included the 1968 compilation album Magic Bus: The Who on Tour. The reissue peaked at No. 185 on the Billboard 200.

The UK mono album was briefly reissued in Britain in 1979 by Virgin Records, during the height of the country's Mod revival. The bands of that scene owed a direct debt to the Who for inspiration, and the younger generations of their fans were keen to explore those original influences. This pressing of the album went out of print in 1980, meaning there was no official UK edition of My Generation again available until the Deluxe Edition of 2002.

In 2002, the album was remixed into stereo and remastered for a Deluxe Edition by Shel Talmy. This was the first time any of these songs had seen a stereo release. While sounding clearer in stereo, this edition omits many overdubs that are prominent in the original mono mixes, notably the lead guitar parts in "A Legal Matter" and "My Generation" (though both songs in their mono mixes close disc 2) and the double-tracked vocals in "The Good's Gone", "Much Too Much", "La-La-La Lies" and "The Kids Are Alright".

In 2008, the album's original UK mono mix was remastered for the Japanese market, appearing in limited numbers as a double-CD box set and a regular single CD album. Both variations included bonus tracks recorded in 1965. The stereo mixes were taken from the 2002 Deluxe Edition release.

In 2012, the album was released using a flat transfer from the original master tapes (for the mono disc) and released in Japan in 2012 as part of a two-disc mono and stereo set with bonus tracks. In the same year, My Generation was released in mono in the UK as a single disc without bonus tracks, using newer generation tapes several times removed from the original master tape.

In 2014, My Generation was released on iTunes and HDtracks in mono and stereo versions with bonus tracks. The mono version was mastered from the same source as the 2012 Japanese release. The stereo version has mixes different from those on the 2002 Deluxe Edition release.

On 18 November 2016, Brunswick/Polydor Europe released a 5-CD super deluxe edition that includes most previous versions of this complicated product in one collection (Brunswick – 5372740, Polydor – 5372740, UMC – 5372740). The set consists of Disc 1: The Original Mono Mixes; Disc 2: The Stereo Mixes; Disc 3: The Original Mono Mixes – Bonus Tracks; Disc 4: The Original Stereo Mixes – Bonus Tracks; Disc 5: Primal Scoop – The 1964–1965 Demo Mixes.

== Reception and legacy ==
Professional ratings
Retrospective
Review scores
Source	Rating
AllMusic	5/5 stars
The Encyclopedia of Popular Music	4/5 stars
The Great Rock Discography	7/10
The Guardian	4/5 stars
Louder Sound	4/5 stars
MusicHound Rock	3/5
PopMatters	9/10
Rolling Stone	4/5 stars
The Rolling Stone Album Guide	5/5 stars
Sputnikmusic	4.5/5
Tom Hull – on the Web	B+

In his 1967 column for Esquire, music critic Robert Christgau called My Generation "the hardest rock in history". Richie Unterberger hailed the album as "the hardest mod pop" ever recorded in a retrospective review for AllMusic: "At the time of its release, it also had the most ferociously powerful guitars and drums yet captured on a rock record." Mark Kemp wrote of the record in The Rolling Stone Album Guide (2004):

With its ferocious blend of grungy distortion, rumbling bass and percussion, and brutish vocals, The Who Sings My Generation became the blueprint for much of the subsequent garage rock, heavy metal, and punk. In contrast to debut albums from the Rolling Stones (whose take on Southern American rock & soul was fairly earnest) and the Beatles (who spread the word of rock & roll through sweet harmonies and easily digestible melodies), My Generation positively shoved at the boundaries of popular music. Townshend's fiercely original guitar experiments here predate the innovations of his later American rival Jimi Hendrix.

The American edition of the album was included in "A Basic Record Library" of 1950s and 1960s recordings, published in Christgau's Record Guide: Rock Albums of the Seventies (1981). In 2000, musician Elvis Costello named the album one of his "500 [favorite] albums that can only improve your life" and "better than everything that I've made". In 2003, My Generation was ranked number 236 on Rolling Stone magazine's list of the 500 greatest albums of all time, then was re-ranked number 237 on the 2012 revised list, and named the second greatest guitar album of all time by Mojo magazine. In 2004, it was No. 18 in Q magazine's list of the 50 Best British Albums Ever. In 2006, it was ranked No. 49 in NME's list of the 100 Greatest British Albums. In 2004, the title track was No. 11 in Rolling Stone magazine's list of the 500 greatest songs of all time. In 2006, "The Kids Are Alright" was No. 34 in Pitchfork's list of the 200 greatest songs of the 1960s. In June 2009, the edited 1966 US version of the album "The Who Sings My Generation" was selected by the Library of Congress for preservation in the National Recording Registry for being "Culturally, historically and aesthetically significant". Writing for the BBC, Chris Jones described the album as "one of the most vital and important reasons to love rock 'n' roll".

Music journalist Phil Smee has identified the tracks It's Not True, The Ox and Anyway, Anyhow, Anywhere as key examples of freakbeat, a term he coined to describe the psychedelic transformation of beat music in 1966.

== Track listing ==
=== Original release (1965) ===
All tracks are written by Pete Townshend, except where noted.

Side one
No.	Title	Writer(s)	Length
1.	"Out in the Street"		2:31
2.	"I Don't Mind"	James Brown	2:36
3.	"The Good's Gone"		4:02
4.	"La-La-La-Lies"		2:17
5.	"Much Too Much"		2:47
6.	"My Generation"		3:18
Total length:			17:31

Side two
No.	Title	Writer(s)	Length
1.	"The Kids Are Alright"		3:04
2.	"Please, Please, Please"	Brown, Johnny Terry	2:45
3.	"It's Not True"		2:31
4.	"I'm a Man"	Bo Diddley	3:21
5.	"A Legal Matter"		2:48
6.	"The Ox"	Townshend, John Entwistle, Keith Moon, Nicky Hopkins	3:50
Total length:			18:19

=== The Who Sings My Generation (1966) ===
Side one
No.	Title	Length
1.	"Out in the Street"	2:31
2.	"I Don't Mind" (writer: Brown)	2:36
3.	"The Good's Gone"	4:02
4.	"La-La-La-Lies"	2:17
5.	"Much Too Much"	2:46
6.	"My Generation"	3:18
Total length:		17:31

Side two
No.	Title	Length
1.	"The Kids Are Alright"	2:46
2.	"Please, Please, Please" (writers: Brown, Terry)	2:45
3.	"It's Not True"	2:31
4.	"The Ox" (writers: Townshend, Entwistle, Moon, Hopkins)	3:50
5.	"A Legal Matter"	2:48
6.	"Instant Party (Circles)"	3:12
Total length:		17:52

=== Deluxe edition (2002) ===
Disc one
No.	Title	Length
1.	"Out in the Street"	2:32
2.	"I Don't Mind" (writer: Brown)	2:33
3.	"The Good's Gone" (lacks double-tracked vocals)	4:00
4.	"La-La-La Lies" (lacks double-tracked vocals)	2:18
5.	"Much Too Much" (lacks double-tracked vocals)	2:45
6.	"My Generation" (lacks lead guitar, but is available on disc two in its original mono format)	3:21
7.	"The Kids Are Alright" (lacks double-tracked vocals)	3:10
8.	"Please, Please, Please" (writers: Brown, Terry)	2:46
9.	"It's Not True"	2:34
10.	"I'm a Man" (complete with ending; writer: Diddley)	3:23
11.	"A Legal Matter" (lacks lead guitar, but is available on disc two in its original mono format)	2:54
12.	"The Ox" (complete with ending; writers: Townshend, Moon, Entwistle, Hopkins)	3:58
13.	"Circles (Instant Party)" (lacks Entwistle's French horn and double tracked vocals)	3:13
14.	"I Can't Explain" (lacks tambourine)	2:04
15.	"Bald Headed Woman" (writer: Shel Talmy)	2:32
16.	"Daddy Rolling Stone" (alternate version to that found on Thirty Years of Maximum R&B; writer: Otis Blackwell)	2:55
Total length:		46:58

Disc two
No.	Title	Length
1.	"Leaving Here" (alternate version to that found on Thirty Years of Maximum R&B; writers: Holland-Dozier-Holland)	2:50
2.	"Lubie (Come Back Home)" (writers: Paul Revere, Mark Lindsay)	3:40
3.	"Shout and Shimmy" (writer: Brown)	3:20
4.	"(Love Is Like A) Heat Wave" (writers: Holland-Dozier-Holland)	2:41
5.	"Motoring" (writers: Ivy Jo Hunter, Phil Jones, William "Mickey" Stevenson)	2:52
6.	"Anytime You Want Me" (writer: Garnet Mimms)	2:38
7.	"Anyway, Anyhow, Anywhere" (alternate take; writers: Townshend, Roger Daltrey)	2:43
8.	"Instant Party Mixture"	3:24
9.	"I Don't Mind" (full length version; writer: Brown)	3:44
10.	"The Good's Gone" (full length version)	4:29
11.	"My Generation" (instrumental version)	3:27
12.	"Anytime You Want Me" (a cappella version; writer: Mimms)	2:29
13.	"A Legal Matter" (mono version with guitar overdub)	2:49
14.	"My Generation" (mono version with guitar overdub)	3:18
Total length:		44:24

=== Digital releases (2014) ===
Mono digital release
No.	Title	Length
1.	"Out in the Street"	2:31
2.	"I Don't Mind" (writer: Brown)	2:36
3.	"The Good's Gone"	4:04
4.	"La-La-La Lies"	2:16
5.	"Much Too Much"	2:44
6.	"My Generation"	3:20
7.	"The Kids Are Alright"	3:07
8.	"Please, Please, Please" (writers: Brown, Terry)	2:46
9.	"It's Not True"	2:32
10.	"I'm a Man" (writer: Diddley)	3:21
11.	"A Legal Matter"	2:50
12.	"The Ox" (writers: Townshend, Moon, Entwistle, Hopkins)	3:53
13.	"I Can't Explain"	2:05
14.	"Bald Headed Woman" (writer: Talmy)	2:10
15.	"Anyway, Anyhow, Anywhere" (writers: Townshend, Daltrey)	2:41
16.	"Daddy Rolling Stone" (writer: Otis Blackwell)	2:48
17.	"Anytime You Want Me" (writer: Mimms)	2:36
18.	"Shout and Shimmy" (writer: Brown)	3:18
19.	"Circles (Revised)"	3:13
20.	"Leaving Here" (erroneously credited to the High Numbers; writers: Holland, Dozier, Holland)	2:49
21.	"Lubie (Come Back Home)" (writers: Revere, Lindsay)	3:37
22.	"(Love Is Like A) Heat Wave" (writers: Holland, Dozier, Holland)	2:41
23.	"Motoring" (writers: Hunter, Jones, Stevenson)	2:49
24.	"Anyway, Anyhow, Anywhere" (French EP Mono Version; writers: Townshend, Daltrey)	2:44
25.	"Instant Party Mixture"	3:26
Total length:		72:57

Stereo digital release
No.	Title	Length
1.	"Out in the Street"	2:30
2.	"I Don't Mind" (writer: Brown)	2:36
3.	"The Good's Gone"	4:05
4.	"La-La-La Lies"	2:15
5.	"Much Too Much"	2:43
6.	"My Generation"	3:18
7.	"The Kids Are Alright"	3:05
8.	"Please, Please, Please" (writers: Brown, Terry)	2:43
9.	"It's Not True"	2:30
10.	"I'm a Man" (writer: Diddley)	3:20
11.	"A Legal Matter"	2:49
12.	"The Ox" (writers: Townshend, Moon, Entwistle, Hopkins)	3:56
13.	"I Can't Explain"	2:05
14.	"Bald Headed Woman" (writer: Talmy)	2:34
15.	"Anyway, Anyhow, Anywhere" (writers: Townshend, Daltrey)	2:43
16.	"Daddy Rolling Stone" (writer: Otis Blackwell)	2:59
17.	"Anytime You Want Me" (writer: Mimms)	2:37
18.	"Shout and Shimmy" (writer: Brown)	3:19
19.	"Circles"	3:13
20.	"Instant Party Mixture"	3:29
21.	"Leaving Here" (writers: Holland, Dozier, Holland)	2:49
22.	"Lubie (Come Back Home)" (writers: Revere, Lindsay)	3:42
23.	"(Love Is Like A) Heat Wave" (writers: Holland, Dozier, Holland)	2:41
24.	"Motoring" (writer: Hunter, Jones, Stevenson)	2:47
25.	"Daddy Rolling Stone" (Alternate stereo version; writer: Otis Blackwell)	3:06
26.	"The Kids Are Alright" (Alternate stereo version)	3:07
27.	"My Generation" (Instrumental stereo version)	3:38
28.	"Out in the Street" (Alternate stereo version)	2:33
29.	"I Don't Mind" (Full length stereo version; writer: Brown)	3:45
30.	"The Good's Gone" (Full length stereo version)	4:27
Total length:		91:24

== B-sides ==
Song	Single	Writer
"Shout and Shimmy"	"My Generation"	James Brown

== Personnel ==
The Who

- Roger Daltrey – lead vocals, harmonica
- Pete Townshend – guitars, backing vocals, lead vocals on "A Legal Matter"
- John Entwistle – bass guitar, backing vocals
- Keith Moon – drums

Additional personnel

- Shel Talmy – production
- Nicky Hopkins – piano
- The Ivy League – backing vocals on "I Can't Explain" and "Bald Headed Woman"
- Perry Ford – piano on "I Can't Explain"
- Jimmy Page – lead guitar on "Bald Headed Woman", rhythm guitar on "I Can't Explain"

== Charts ==
Chart performance for My Generation
Chart (1965–1966)	Peak position
Finnish Albums (Official Finnish Charts)	4
German Albums (Offizielle Top 100)	14
UK Albums (Official Charts)	5

== Certifications ==
Certifications for My Generation
Region	Certification	Certified units/sales
United Kingdom (BPI) release of 1980	Gold	100,000^{^}
United Kingdom (BPI) release of 2012	Silver	60,000^{‡}
^{^} Shipments figures based on certification alone.^{‡} Sales+streaming figures based on certification alone.

== See also ==
- British Invasion
- British rock music
- Mod (subculture)

== Bibliography ==
- Kemp, Mark (2004). "The Who". In Brackett, Nathan; Hoard, Christian (eds.). The New Rolling Stone Album Guide (4th ed.). Simon & Schuster. ISBN 0-7432-0169-8.
