= The Kids Are Alright (song) =

Song by The Who

- Dutch picture sleeve

Single by the Who

from the album My Generation
- B-side: "A Legal Matter" (US) "The Ox" (UK)
- Released: July 1966 (US); 12 August 1966 (UK)
- Recorded: 13 October 1965
- Studio: IBC, London
- Genre: Rock; power pop; jangle pop
- Length: 3:05 (UK); 2:45 (US)
- Label: Brunswick (UK); Decca (US)
- Songwriter: Pete Townshend
- Producer: Shel Talmy

The Who singles chronology
"A Legal Matter" (1966)	"The Kids Are Alright" (1966)	"I'm a Boy" (1966)

"The Kids Are Alright" is a song written by Pete Townshend and recorded by the English rock band the Who. It appears as the seventh track on their debut album My Generation (1965). "The Kids Are Alright" is included on the list of The Rock and Roll Hall of Fame's 500 Songs that Shaped Rock and Roll, and has been regarded by many as one of the band's finest songs and one of the most important and recognizable anthems of the 1960s.

== Background ==
"The Kids Are Alright" was not released as a single until more than six months after it first appeared on the LP, first in the United States, and in the United Kingdom the following month. While not a significant hit at the time (reaching number 41 in the UK and number 85 in the US), the song, along with the album "My Generation", became anthems for the band and the Mod subculture of Britain in the 1960s. It later became the name of the documentary for the band in 1979. The song was edited for release in the U.S. and this version has become much more common than the original full-length UK version. The edit of the song features a substantially shortened instrumental break. A promotional film for the song was shot in Hyde Park in July or August 1966. In addition to appearing on My Generation, the beginning of the song can be heard on Quadrophenia, after the song "Helpless Dancer" has faded out.

The song uses a standard I-IV-V chord progression in the key of D while the chorus uses a ii-V-IV-I chord progression.

In present-day live performances, The Who add a long extra section to the end of "The Kids Are Alright", with partly improvised lyrics discussing the lessons learned since the song's composition. A version of this can be heard on Live at the Royal Albert Hall, recorded in 2000, in which Townshend assesses:

When I wrote this song I was nothing but a kid, trying to work out right and wrong through all the things I did. I was kind of practising with my life. I was kind of taking chances in a marriage with my wife. I took some stuff and I drank some booze. There was almost nothing that I didn't try to use. And somehow I'm alright.

After John Entwistle's death in 2002, the extra lyrics occasionally made reference to him, and his love of old red wine, which later inspired their song "Old Red Wine", a tribute to Entwistle.

During 2006 the song was listed at number 34 in Pitchfork's list of the 200 greatest songs of the 1960s.

== Covers ==
The song has been covered by bands such as the Pleasers (their third single in 1978), the Queers, Goldfinger, Eddie and the Hot Rods, Dropkick Murphys, Hi-Standard, Green Day, Pearl Jam, the Raveonettes, Patti Smith, the Kids, and Belle & Sebastian who closed their set with it at the Bowlie Weekender in 1999. In 2008, Billy Bob Thornton's band The Boxmasters recorded a version of the song as the closing number on the second disc of their album The Boxmasters. The song was also recorded for a covers album by Matthew Sweet and Bangles' Susanna Hoffs. Keith Moon, the drummer of the Who, also recorded a cover of this song for his 1975 solo album Two Sides of the Moon. In 2016, the song was covered in the Nickelodeon television show School of Rock.

== In popular culture ==
This song is referenced in the title of the song "The Kids Aren't Alright" by the Offspring, the unrelated Fall Out Boy song of the same title, "The Kids are Alt-Right" by Bad Religion, "The Kids Are Insane" by Urge Overkill, "The Kids Are All Wrong" by Lagwagon, "All the Kids Are Right" by Local H, Awolnation's "THISKIDSNOTALRIGHT" and "The Kids" by The Parlor Mob, in which the main chorus line is 'No, the kids ain't alright', as well as the songs "Kids" by Robbie Williams and Kylie Minogue and "The Kids Are Alright" by Chloe x Halle featured on their album of the same name. The title of the song was also used in the 2010 film The Kids Are All Right and for episode titles of the American television shows That 70's Show and Supernatural, as well as the Ballers Season 4 episode "The Kids Are Aight". It was also punned and featured in The Simpsons episode "The Kids Are All Fight". It was also used in the Final Fantasy VII novel The Kids Are Alright: A Turks Side Story, the novel having various references to The Who.
