= Shel Talmy =

American record producer, songwriter and arranger (1937–2024)

Background information
- Born: Sheldon Talmy; August 11, 1937; Chicago, Illinois, U.S.
- Died: November 13, 2024 (aged 87) Los Angeles, California, U.S.
- Genres: Rock; folk; folk rock; pop
- Occupations: Producer; songwriter; author; arranger; book publisher
- Years active: 1959–2024
- Website: sheltalmy.com

Sheldon Talmy (August 11, 1937 – November 13, 2024) was an American record producer, songwriter, and arranger, most notable for his work in England in the 1960s with the Who, the Kinks, and many other artists.

Talmy arranged and produced hits such as "You Really Got Me" by the Kinks, "My Generation" by the Who, and "Friday on My Mind" by the Easybeats. He also played guitar or percussion on some of his productions.

== Early career ==
Sheldon Talmy was born on August 11, 1937 in Chicago, Illinois, the son of Esther (Gutes) and Isaac Talmy, a dentist. From an early age, he was interested both in music (early rock, rhythm and blues, folk music, and country music) as well as the technology of the recording studio. At the age of 13, Talmy appeared regularly on the popular NBC-TV television show Quiz Kids, a question-and-answer program from Chicago. He told Chris Ambrose of Tokion Magazine, "What it did for me was that I absolutely knew that this was the business I wanted to be in."

He graduated from Fairfax High School in Los Angeles in June 1955, the same high school attended by songwriter Jerry Leiber, A&M label owner and performer Herb Alpert, Michael Jackson, and producer Phil Spector.

After working for ABC Television, he became a recording engineer at Conway Studios in Los Angeles, where owner/engineer Phil Yeend trained him on three-track recording equipment. Three days later, Talmy had his first assignment, producing the record "Falling Star" by Debbie Sharron. According to journalist Chris Hunt, Talmy's move from television to audio recording was a result of "the rapid deterioration of his eyesight."

At Conway, he worked with Gary Paxton, producer of the Hollywood Argyles' "Alley Oop", surf music band the Marketts, vocal group the Castells, R&B pioneers Rene Hall and Bumps Blackwell, and the elite group of session musicians known as the "Wrecking Crew".

Talmy and Yeend often experimented with production techniques. They played with separation and recording levels and built baffles and platforms covered with carpet, using them to isolate vocals and instruments.

In an interview with Terri Stone in Music Producers, Talmy recalled that Yeend "would let me do whatever I wanted after our regular sessions were over, so I used to work out miking techniques for how to make drums sound better or guitars sound better. ... There really weren't many precedents, so we were all doing it for the first time together. It was all totally new."

== British career ==
In the summer of 1962, Talmy went to Britain, ostensibly for a 5-week European vacation. He went with little money and thought he might be able to work for a couple of weeks to earn some more.

Nick Venet, a good friend and producer at Capitol Records, gave him a stack of acetates to take along with him and use as if he had produced them, if it could get him a job.

Talmy met with Dick Rowe, head of Decca Records A&R, and played two of the acetates he was given to use. They were "Music in the Air" by Lou Rawls, and "Surfin' Safari" by The Beach Boys. Rowe told him, "You start today".

Talmy joined Decca Records as an independent record producer (among the first in the UK) working with Decca's pop performers, such as Irish trio the Bachelors, leading to the release of the hit single "Charmaine".

Once he struck out as an independent, Talmy also had success in the United States with his productions for Chad & Jeremy, including "A Summer Song" and "Willow Weep for Me".

In 1963 Talmy met Robert Wace, the manager of a group called the Ravens, who later changed their name to the Kinks. He brought the Kinks into the studio and their third single, "You Really Got Me", became a landmark recording.

Talmy hired future Led Zeppelin guitarist Jimmy Page as a session musician on many of the Kinks' early recordings; he played rhythm guitar on "You Really Got Me".

Talmy produced many more hits with the group up to 1967, including "All Day and All of the Night", "Tired of Waiting for You", "Dedicated Follower of Fashion", "Well Respected Man", "Sunny Afternoon", and "Waterloo Sunset".

=== The Who and My Generation ===
Pete Townshend, guitarist of a band called the High Numbers, liked "You Really Got Me" so much that he wrote a similar number, "I Can't Explain", so that Talmy might produce his group. When the song was played over the telephone to Talmy, he agreed to hear the band. Renamed the Who, they were rehearsing at a church hall, and Talmy says it took about eight bars before he said "Yes!" The band was signed to his production company, Orbit-Universal. Talmy got the band a contract with Decca in America and with their subsidiary Brunswick Records in Britain, and produced recordings modeled on the band's high-energy live performances.

The intentional feedback on the band's second single, "Anyway, Anyhow, Anywhere", caused U.S. Decca executives to send back the recording, thinking that they had received a faulty pressing, and Talmy had to assure them it was intentional.

Talmy and the Who created a historic recording in "My Generation", the group's third release. Entertainment Weekly later called "My Generation" the "quintessential rock single".

Talmy also produced the Who's debut studio album, My Generation (1965), a collection of original songs and R&B covers. However, tensions arose between Talmy and one of the band's managers, Kit Lambert.

Lambert 'fired' Talmy, but Talmy sued for breach of contract and won. Talmy called it a Pyrrhic victory, as he would no longer produce any records by the Who.

Talmy held the original session tapes to the My Generation album, but a re-release was held up for years because of the ongoing dispute. This prevented a proper re-release of the LP until 2002, when things were finally settled in Talmy's favor. My Generation was subsequently remixed by Talmy and issued on compact disc with bonus tracks.

In his book Before I Get Old, Dave Marsh commented that the records that Talmy made with the Who "are technically among the best that the band ever did, and they have a distinct, original sound."

Thanks to his work with the Who and the Kinks, Talmy is considered to have been at the forefront of the British music scene in the mid-1960s.

== Production style ==
In a 1989 interview with writer Chris Hunt, Talmy described his approach to music production: "There are two categories of producers. Let me explain. First, one produces an artist the way 'they' want to hear to them, without a whole lot of regard to what the artist is really like, or how they see themselves. I'd like to think that I'm in the other category. I liked the artists that I produced – a lot, or else I wouldn't produce them, and what I wanted to do was enhance what they do already. I just wanted to make it better, more polished, put the best frame around it I could. The other 'category' of producers are divided between what I subscribe to, 'hands-on', i.e. being there from inception, and all through the recording to mastering."

In another interview with musician/producer/songwriter Artie Wayne, Talmy dismissed the idea that great music production relies primarily on some kind of personal "magic": "[Laughing] The productions don't just materialize out of a clear blue sky. I spent a lot of time in the studio working out how to isolate instruments, how to mic drums, how to do all kinds of stuff. When I arrived in London, I started recording drums using twelve mics, which I had worked out how to do in Los Angeles. Everybody in London, at the time, were only using three or four mics. They said I couldn't do that because it would (create) phase. I said, 'Just listen to it, see if it does. A month later everybody was trying to use 12 mics on the drums!'"

Asked, in the same interview, if he always picks the songs for the artists he produces, Talmy replied: "I'm a hands-on producer, meaning that I always work with the artist on choosing material, doing the arrangements, getting musicians if necessary, choosing the studio and being there for the entire production on through the mixes and mastering."

== Work with other artists ==
Talmy continued to work with other distinguished British performers throughout the 1960s, principal amongst whom was singer-songwriter David Bowie (then known by his real name Davy Jones). Talmy produced two singles in 1965 by two groups featuring Bowie, "I Pity The Fool" by The Manish Boys and "You've Got A Habit Of Leaving", where the singer was accompanied by The Lower Third. He was known to have a considerable amount of unreleased material by Bowie in his archive.

Another artist of lasting impact that Talmy produced was Australian group The Easybeats. Though successful in Australia, the act floundered when it first arrived in the UK in the summer of 1966. The first session under Talmy's direction produced the massive global hit "Friday On My Mind". Writing in the Encyclopedia of Popular Music, Colin Larkin described the song as "one of the all-time great beat group singles of the '60s". Bowie later covered "Friday on My Mind" on his album Pin Ups. Talmy's work with The Easybeats stretched through to their 1967 album Good Friday, after which the band's management decided to dismiss him as producer.

Once established as an independent producer in early 1964, Talmy would be incredibly busy over the next five years, producing dozens of discs, largely in the beat and mod categories, genres with which he would be forever associated. These include records by Mickey Finn, The First Gear, The Sneekers, The Untamed, Ben Carruthers & The Deep, The Nashville Teens, The Thoughts, Colette & The Bandits, Wild Silk and many others. He was also hired to work with successful acts like Manfred Mann, for whom he produced the hits singles "Just Like A Woman" and "Semi-Detached Suburban Mr James", and Amen Corner ("If Paradise Was Half as Nice" and "Hello Susie"). Talmy also produced the pioneering all-women quartet Goldie and the Gingerbreads, and produced other female acts such as Liz Shelley, Dani Sheridan, Vicki Brown and The Orchids.

In late 1965, Talmy and impresario Arthur Howes formed their own label, Planet Records, distributed by Philips Records. Although the venture was not successful, the label did release the initial discs by Talmy's discovery The Creation, now considered amongst the most iconic of mod/psychedelic groups, who often used pop-art imagery. These included "Making Time" and "Painter Man". Their later work with Talmy such as "How Does It Feel To Feel" was issued on Polydor and Talmy has said that he did some of his most essential work with the Creation.

Though he was famous primarily for his contributions to rock music, Talmy also worked with musicians from the folk scene, including Pentangle, Roy Harper and Ralph McTell. He has also worked in the pop, orchestral, pop and punk categories.

He produced the early Roy Harper albums Come Out Fighting Ghengis Smith and Folkjokeopus in 1967. In 1968 and 1969 Talmy produced the influential first three albums by the folk supergroup, Pentangle, as well as their hit single "Light Flight". In the late 1960s Talmy worked with American artists Lee Hazlewood and Tim Rose and supervised film music with his favored arranger David Whitaker. For CBS, he produced Music to Spy By and The Revolutionary Piano of Nicky Hopkins, both arranged and conducted by Whitaker.

By the early 1970s, Talmy was doing less record production work and pursuing his other interests in the book publishing and filmmaking worlds. He was however still in demand as a producer and worked on records by Small Faces, String Driven Thing, Fumble, Coven, Chris White, Mick Cox Band, Blues Project, Rumplestiltskin and others. He had production deals with the Bell and Charisma labels in the 1970s. Amongst his final UK productions was a collector's item single by punk group The Damned ("Stretcher Case Baby"/"Sick of Being Sick").

Talmy returned to the United States in 1979. Though he reduced his workload, he continued to be sought after to produce artists. He produced albums by Fuzztones, Nancy Boy and Sorrows. Most recently he produced records by Hidden Charms and Strangers in a Strange Land.

In 2003, a tribute to Talmy was aired on the radio program Little Steven's Underground Garage. In 2017, Ace Records began issuing a series of compilations from Talmy's vintage catalog, including the career anthology Making Time − A Shel Talmy Production, produced by Alec Palao.

== Personal life and death ==
Shel Talmy was Jewish. He lived in the Los Angeles area. He had two children, Jonna and Steven Talmy (twins). He was the elder brother of the American linguist Leonard Talmy.

Talmy died from complications of a stroke on November 13, 2024, at the age of 87.

== Selected discography ==
=== The Kinks ===
==== Singles ====
- "Long Tall Sally" b/w "I Took My Baby Home" (1964)
- "You Still Want Me" b/w "You Do Something To Me" (1964)
- "You Really Got Me" b/w "It's Alright", Pye (UK), Reprise (U.S.), (1964)
- "All Day and All of the Night" b/w "I Gotta Move" (1964)
- Kinksize Session (EP) (1964)
- "Tired of Waiting for You" b/w "Come On Now" (1965)
- "Ev'rybody's Gonna Be Happy" b/w "Who'll Be the Next In Line" (1965)
- "Set Me Free" b/w "I Need You" (1965)
- "See My Friends" b/w "Never Met a Girl Like You Before" (1965)
- Kwyet Kinks (EP) (1964)
- "Till the End of the Day" b/w "Where Have All the Good Times Gone" (1965)
- "Dedicated Follower of Fashion" b/w "Sitting On My Sofa" (1966)
- "A Well Respected Man" b/w "Milk Cow Blues" (1966)
- "Sunny Afternoon" b/w "I'm Not Like Everybody Else" (1966)
- "Dead End Street" b/w "Big Black Smoke" (1966)
- "Mister Pleasant" b/w "This Is Where I Belong" (European Release) (1967)
- "Waterloo Sunset" b/w "Act Nice & Gentle" (1967)

==== Albums ====
- Kinks, Pye, 1964, as You Really Got Me, Reprise (U.S.), 1964
- Kinks-Size, Reprise, 1965
- Kinda Kinks, Pye (UK) 1965, Reprise (U.S.), 1965
- The Kink Kontroversy, Pye (UK) 1965, Reprise (U.S.), 1966
- Kinkdom, Reprise (U.S.) 1965
- Face to Face, Pye (UK) 1966, Reprise (U.S.) 1967
- Something Else by The Kinks, Pye (UK) 1967, Reprise (U.S.) 1968

Note: Talmy also produced numerous tracks that would appear on later albums, singles, and archival collections.

=== Dave Davies ===
- "Death of a Clown" b/w "Love Me Till the Sun Shines" (1967)

=== The Who ===
==== Singles ====
- "I Can't Explain" b/w "Bald Headed Woman", Brunswick (UK), Decca (U.S.) (1965)
- "Anyway, Anyhow, Anywhere" b/w "Daddy Rolling Stone", Brunswick (UK), 1965, Decca (U.S.) (1965)
- "My Generation" b/w "Shout and Shimmy", Brunswick (UK), 1965, Decca (U.S.) (1965)
- "A Legal Matter" b/w "Instant Party" (1966)
- "The Kids Are Alright" b/w "The Ox" (1966)
- "La La La Lies" b/w "The Good's Gone" (1966)

Albums

- My Generation (1965)

Note: Talmy also produced numerous tracks that would appear on later archival collections.

=== David Bowie ===
Singles

- "I Pity the Fool" b/w "Take My Tip" (as The Manish Boys) (1965)
- "You've Got a Habit of Leaving" b/w "Baby Loves That Way" (as Davy Jones) (1965)

Note: the 1991 Bowie collection Early On features five additional vintage tracks from Talmy's archive.

Note: the 2026 Bowie compilation The Shel Talmy Recordings features many of the recordings Talmy produced for Bowie.

=== The Easybeats ===
==== Singles ====
- "Friday On My Mind" b/w "Made My Bed; Gonna Lie In It" United Artists Records (UK & US), Albert Productions/Parlophone (Australia) (1966)
- "Who'll Be The One" b/w "Saturday Night" United Artists Records (UK), Albert Productions/Parlophone (Australia) (1967)

==== Album ====
- Good Friday, United Artists Records, 1967, as Friday On My Mind, United Artists Records (US) (1967)

=== The Creation ===
Singles

- "Making Time" b/w "Try & Stop Me" (1966)
- "Painter Man" b/w "Biff Bang Pow" (1966)
- "If I Stay Too Long" b/w "Nightmares" (1967)
- "Life Is Just Beginning" b/w "Through My Eyes" (1967)
- "How Does It Feel To Feel" b/w "Tom Tom" (1967)
- "Midway Down" b/w "The Girls Are Naked" (1968)
- "For All That I Am" b/w "Uncle Bert" (German release) (1968)
- "Bonney Moroney" [sic] b/w "Mercy Mercy Mercy" (German release) (1968)

Album

- We Are Paintermen (German release) (1967)

=== Manfred Mann ===
Singles

- "Just Like a Woman" b/w "I Wanna Be Rich" (1966)
- "Semi-Detached, Suburban Mr. James" b/w "Morning After The Party" (1966)
- Instrumental Assassination EP (1966)
- "Ha! Ha! Said the Clown" b/w "Feeling So Good" (1967)

Album

- As Is (1966)

=== Roy Harper ===
Singles

- "Midspring Dithering" b/w "Zengem" (1967)
- "Life Goes By" b/w "Nobody's Got Any Money In The Summer" (1968)

Albums

- Come Out Fighting Ghengis Smith (1967)
- Folkjokeopus (1969)

=== The Bachelors ===
Singles and EPs

- "Charmaine" b/w "Old Bill" (1963)
- The Bachelors EP (1963)
- "Faraway Places" b/w "Is There A Chance" (1963)
- "Whispering" b/w "No Light In The Window" (1963)

Album

- Presenting The Bachelors (1963)

=== Chad & Jeremy ===
Singles

- "A Summer Song" b/w "No Tears For Johnnie" (1964)
- "Willow Weep for Me" b/w "If She Was Mine" (1964)

Album

- Sing For You (1965)

=== Amen Corner ===
Singles

- "(If Paradise Is) Half as Nice" b/w "Hey Hey Girl" (1969)
- "Hello Susie" b/w "Evil Man's Gonna Win" (1969)

Album

- The National Welsh Coast Live Explosion Company (1969)

=== Pentangle ===
Singles

- "Travelin' Song" b/w "Mirage" (1968)
- "Way Behind The Sun" b/w "Let No Man Steal Your Thyme" (US release) (1968)
- "Once I Had A Sweetheart" b/w "I Saw An Angel" (1968)
- "Light Flight" (theme from Take Three Girls) b/w "Cold Mountain" (1969)

Albums

- The Pentangle (1968)
- Sweet Child (1968)
- Basket Of Light (1969)

=== Selected singles productions ===
- Sean Buckley & The Breadcrumbs – "It Hurts Me When I Cry" b/w "Everybody Knows" (1965)
- Ben Carruthers & The Deep – "Jack O' Diamonds" b/w "Right Behind You" (1965)
- Tony Christie & The Trackers – "Life's Too Good To Waste" b/w "Just The Two Of Us" (1966)
- Colette & The Bandits – "A Ladies Man" b/w "Lost Love" (1965)
- The Corduroys – "Tick Tock" b/w "Too Much Of A Woman" (1966)
- The Damned – "Stretcher Case Baby" b/w "Sick Of Being Sick" (1977)
- The Dennisons – "Lucy (You Sure Did It This Time)" b/w "Nobody Like My Babe" (1964)
- Blair Emry – "Annabelle" b/w "Driving On The Wrong Side" (1970)
- Faint Heart And Fair Lady Band – "So Long Susie" b/w "Sing A Little Sunshine Song" (US release) (1970)
- The Firing Squad – "A Little Bit More" b/w "Bull Moose" (1964)
- The First Gear – "A Certain Girl" b/w "Leave My Kitten Alone" (1964)
- Follow The Buffalo – "September Song" b/w "Long Gone Stayed At Home" (1971)
- The Fortunes – "Caroline" b/w "If You Don't Want Me Now" (1964)
- Ray Gates – "It's Such A Shame" b/w "Have You Ever Had The Blues" (1966)
- Wayne Gibson & The Dynamic Sounds – "Kelly" b/w "See You Later Alligator" (1964)
- Goldie and the Gingerbreads – "That's Why I Love You" b/w "The Skip" (1965)
- Johnny B Great – "Acapulco 1922" b/w "You'll Never Leave Him" (1964)
- The Hearts – "Young Woman" b/w "Black Eyes" (1964)
- Dave Helling – "Christine" b/w "The Bells" (1965)
- Hidden Charms – "Dreaming Of Another Girl" b/w "Long Way Down" (2015)
- Jon Mark – "Baby I Got A Long Way To Go" b/w "Night Comes Down" (1965)
- Kenny & The Wranglers – "Somebody Help Me" b/w "Who Do You Think I Am" (1965)
- Steven Lancaster – "San Francisco Street" b/w "Miguel Fernando Stan Sebastian Brown" (1967)
- The Lancastrians – "We'll Sing in the Sunshine" b/w "Was She Tall" (1964)
- Perpetual Langley – "Surrender" b/w "Two By Two" (1966)
- Van Lenton – "Gotta Get Away" b/w "You Don't Care" (1965)
- The Liberators – "It Hurts So Much" b/w "You Look So Fine" (1965)
- Houston Wells – "Blue Of The Night" b/w "Coming Home" (1965)
- Lindsay Muir's Untamed – "Daddy Long Legs" b/w "Trust Yourself A Little Bit" (1966)
- Tony Lord – "World's Champion" b/w "It Makes Me Sad" (1965)
- Magic Alley – "Set Yourself Free" b/w "The Answer Lies In Love" (US release) (1970)
- Margo & The Marvettes – "Say You Will" b/w "Cherry Pie" (1964)
- Ralph McTell – "Heroes And Villains" b/w "Sweet Girl On My Mind" (1978)
- The Mickey Finn – "The Sporting Life" b/w "Night Comes Down" (1965)
- Kenny Miller – "Restless" b/w "Take My Tip" (1965)
- The Nashville Teens – "I'm Coming Home" b/w "Searching" (1967)
- Shel Naylor – "One Fine Day" b/w "It's Gonna Happen Soon" (1964)
- Oliver Norman – "Drowning In My Own Despair" b/w "Down In The Basement" (1967)
- The Orchids – "Gonna Make Him Mine" b/w "Stay At Home" (1963)
- Eddie Phillips – "City Woman" b/w "Duckin' & Weavin'" (1977)
- Platinum – "Without You" b/w "If You Saw Johnny Now" (1970)
- Porky – "I'm An Artist" b/w "Flag" (1971)
- The Pros & Cons – "Whirlybird – Part I" b/w "Whirlybird − Part II" (US release) (1965)
- The Rising Sons – "Talk To Me Baby" b/w "Try To Be A Man" (1965)
- The Rockin' Vickers – "Dandy" b/w "I Don't Need Your Kind" (1966)
- Clodagh Rodgers – "Believe Me I'm No Fool" b/w "End Of The Line" (1963)
- The Sallyangie – "Two Ships" b/w "Colours Of The World" (1969)
- Debbie Sharron – "Falling Star" b/w "Cruel Way To Be" (US release) (1962)
- Liz Shelley – "No More Love" b/w "I Can't Find You" (1966)
- Dani Sheridan – "Guess I'm Dumb" b/w "Songs Of Love" (1966)
- Small Faces – "Lookin' For A Love" b/w "Kayoed (By Luv)" (1977)
- The Sneekers – "Bald Headed Woman" b/w "I Just Can't Go To Sleep" (1964)
- The Sundowners – "Where Am I" b/w "Gotta Make Their Future Bright" (1965)
- The Talismen – "Castin' My Spell" b/w "Masters Of War" (1965)
- The Thoughts – "All Night Stand" b/w "Memory Of Your Love" (1966)
- The Untamed – "I'll Go Crazy" b/w "My Baby Is Gone" (1965)
- Wild Silk – "(Vision In A) Plaster Sky" b/w "Toymaker" (1969)
- The Zephyrs – "She's Lost You" b/w "There's Something About You" (1965)

=== Selected album productions ===
- Axiom – If Only . . . (1971)
- Band Of Joy – Band Of Joy (1978)
- Blues Project – Lazarus (US release) (1971)
- Vicki Brown – From The Inside (1977)
- Coven – Blood On The Snow (US release) (1974)
- Mick Cox Band – Mick Cox Band (US release) (1973)
- Bill Davies With The David Whitaker Orchestra – . . . And a Touch of Love (1966)
- Foresight – Foresight (1974)
- Fumble – Poetry In Lotion (1974)
- Fuzztones – In Heat (1989)
- Lee Hazlewood – Forty (1969)
- Nicky Hopkins – The Revolutionary Piano Of (1967)
- Bert Jansch – Birthday Blues (1969)
- Jon & Alun – Relax Your Mind (1963)
- Jon and the Nightriders – Charge of the Nightriders (Enigma) (1983)
- Kristine – I'm a Song (1976)
- Nancy Boy – Nancy Boy (US release) (1996)
- Tim Rose – Love − A Kind Of Hate Story (1970)
- Rumplestiltskin – Rumplestiltskin (1970)
- Seanor & Koss – Seanor & Koss (US release) (1972)
- Sorrows – Love Too Late (US release) (1981)
- Spreadeagle – The Piece Of Paper (1972)
- String Driven Thing – The Machine That Cried (1973)
- Velvet Glove – Sweet Was My Rose (1974)
- David Whitaker – Music To Spy By (1966)
- Chris White – Mouth Music (1976)
- The Fifth Estate (band) -- Time Tunnel (2011)

=== Selected film soundtrack work ===
- Be My Guest (1965)
- Scream And Scream Again (1970)
- Tam-Lin (1970)

=== Selected archival collections ===
- Sensational Alex Harvey Band – Hot City (unreleased 1974 album produced by Talmy) (2009)
- The Best Of Planet Records (2000)
- Making Time: A Shel Talmy Production (2017)
- Planet Mod (2018)
- Planet Beat (2018)
- Shel's Girls (2019)
- The Shel Talmy Recordings (2026)

== Selected writings ==
- Whadda We Do Now, Butch?, Pan Books Ltd., 1978
- Hunter Killer, Pan Books Ltd., 1981
- The Web, Dell, 1981
