= I'm a Boy =

- Swedish picture sleeve

Single by the Who
- B-side: "In the City"
- Released: 26 August 1966
- Recorded: 14 & 19 June, & 31 July 1966
- Studio: IBC, London
- Length: 2:34
- Label: Reaction (UK); Decca (US)
- Songwriter: Pete Townshend
- Producer: Kit Lambert

The Who singles chronology
"The Kids Are Alright" (1966)	"I'm a Boy" (1966)	"La-La-La-Lies" (1966)

Performance video
- "I'm a Boy" on BeatClub (1967) on YouTube

"I'm a Boy" is a 1966 rock song written by Pete Townshend for the Who. The song was originally intended to be a part of a rock opera called Quads, which was to be set in a future in which parents can choose the sex of their children. The idea was later scrapped, but this song survived and was later released as a single.

== Overview ==
The song is about a family who "order" four girls, but a mistake is made and three girls and one boy are delivered instead. The boy dreams of partaking in sports and other boy-type activities, but his mother forces him to act like his sisters and refuses to believe the truth ("I'm a boy, I'm a boy, but my Ma won't admit it"). The track was produced by Kit Lambert at IBC Studios around 31 July–1 August 1966 and released just over three weeks later on 26 August 1966, with "In the City" as the B-side. The single was hugely successful in the United Kingdom and Ireland, reaching No. 2 in the UK Singles Chart, No. 1 in the Melody Maker chart and No. 7 in Ireland. It failed to repeat that success in the US.

The original recording (released as a single), which features John Entwistle's French horn arrangement prominently in the mix, is available on the album Who's Missing. The version included on most compilations, between the original 1966 release and The Who Hits 50!, is exactly the same recording, with French horns and drum overdubs removed.

A different, slower version was recorded in London in the week of 3 October 1966 and was intended for an early version of A Quick One titled Jigsaw Puzzle, but was later released on Meaty Beaty Big and Bouncy in 1971. The same version, but without its intro and therefore beginning with the vocals, was released on a bonus disc of The Ultimate Collection in 2002 and is unique to that album.

The song was performed at the Who's concert at Leeds, released in album format as Live at Leeds. On the Live at Leeds album, Pete Townshend comments on the song by saying:

We'd like to play three selected hit singles--three easiest...and "I'm a Boy" which according to the, (crowd cheers) thank you, according to the Melody Maker was our first number one in England I think for about a half an hour (crowd laughs).

== "In the City" ==
Released as the B-side of the single was "In the City", the only song credited to the songwriting collaboration of John Entwistle and Keith Moon. Entwistle referred to it as rip-off of Jan and Dean, a group that was a favorite of Moon's. The track was later included on the 1995 reissue of A Quick One.

== Charts ==
Chart (1966–1967)	Peak position
Belgium (Ultratop 50 Flanders)	16
Belgium (Ultratop 50 Wallonia)	16
Ireland (IRMA)	7
Netherlands (Dutch Top 40)	6
New Zealand (Listener)	2
Norway (VG-lista)	4
UK Singles (Official Charts)	2
West Germany (Media Control)	10
