= My Generation =

1965 single by the Who

- Swedish picture sleeve

Single by the Who

from the album My Generation
- B-side: "Shout and Shimmy" (UK); "Out in the Street" (US)
- Released: 29 October 1965 (UK); 20 November 1965 (US)
- Recorded: 13 October 1965
- Studio: IBC, London
- Genre: Rock; hard rock; proto-punk; power pop
- Length: 3:18
- Label: Brunswick 05944 (UK) Decca 31877 (US)
- Songwriter: Pete Townshend
- Producer: Shel Talmy

The Who singles chronology
"Anyway, Anyhow, Anywhere" (1965)	"My Generation" (1965)	"Substitute" (1966)

Audio sample
- file; help

"My Generation" is a song by the English rock band the Who, written by guitarist and primary songwriter Pete Townshend, from their debut album of the same name (1965). It was released as a single on 29 October 1965, reaching number two in the United Kingdom (their highest-charting single in their home country with 1966's "I'm a Boy") and number 74 in the United States. The song also appeared in greatly extended form on their live album Live at Leeds (1970).

One of the band's signature songs, "My Generation" was placed number 11 by Rolling Stone on its list of the "500 Greatest Songs of All Time" in 2004 and 2010, re-ranked number 232 in the 2021 edition. It was included in the Rock and Roll Hall of Fame's "500 Songs that Shaped Rock and Roll" and inducted into the Grammy Hall of Fame for being "historical, artistic and significant".

== Recording ==
Townshend reportedly wrote the song on a train and is said to have been inspired by the Queen Mother, who is alleged to have had Townshend's 1935 Packard hearse towed off a street in Belgravia because she was offended by the sight of it during her daily drive through the neighbourhood. Townshend has also credited Mose Allison's "Young Man Blues" as the inspiration for the song, saying "Without Mose I wouldn't have written 'My Generation'."

The Who re-recorded the song for the Ready Steady Who EP in 1966; ultimately it was not included, and remained unissued until the 1995 remaster of A Quick One. The main difference between this version and the original is that it is heavily abridged and instead of the hail of feedback which closes the original, the band play a chaotic rendition of Edward Elgar's "Land of Hope and Glory". In the album's liner notes the song is thus credited to both Pete Townshend and Elgar.

== Composition ==
=== Music and lyrics ===
Townshend told Rolling Stone in 1985 that 'My Generation' was "very much about trying to find a place in society." On a later interview for Good Morning America, in 1989, the band was discussing the upcoming 1989 tour to celebrate the 20th anniversary of Tommy, and Townshend talked about the famous line "I hope I die before I get old." He said that, for him, when he wrote the lyrics, "old" meant "very rich". The song's lyrics comprise a distilled statement of youthful rebellion. The song's melody and composition is considered a forebear to punk rock. One of the most quoted—and patently rewritten—lines in rock history is "I hope I die before I get old," famously sneered by lead singer Roger Daltrey.

For the band the song was the basis for an extended medley or improvisation, going on as long as fifteen minutes, as evinced by the version appearing on Live at Leeds. Live recordings from 1969 to 1970 include snippets of music from Tommy as well as parts of what would become "Naked Eye". Townshend's demo version of the song (together with a demo of "Pinball Wizard") appeared on a flexi disc included in the original edition of the book The Who: Maximum R&B by Richard Barnes.

The instrumental elements of the song are fast and aggressive. Significantly, "My Generation" also featured one of the first bass solos in rock history. This was played by Entwistle on his Fender Jazz Bass, rather than the Danelectro bass he wanted to use; after buying three Danelectros with rare thin strings that kept breaking easily (and were not available separately), a frustrated Entwistle used his Fender strung with nylon tapewound strings and was forced to simplify the solo. The song's coda features drumming from Keith Moon, as well, whereupon the song breaks down in spurts of guitar feedback from Townshend's Rickenbacker, rather than fading out or ending cleanly on the tonic. There are two guitar parts. The basic instrumental track (as reflected on the instrumental version on the My Generation Deluxe edition) followed by Townshend's overdubs including the furious feedback on the coda. Similarly to the Kinks's "You Really Got Me" (also produced by Shel Talmy), the song modulates from its opening key of G up to C via the keys of A and B♭. Townshend's guitars were tuned down a whole step for the recording.

=== Vocals ===
"My Generation" vocal melody with call and response.

The vocal melody of "My Generation" is an example of the shout-and-fall modal frame. This call and response is mirrored in the instrumental break with solo emphasis passing from Townshend's guitar to Entwistle's bass and back again several times. Like much of the Who's earlier mod output, the song showcases influences of American rhythm and blues, most explicitly in the call and response form of the verses. Daltrey would sing a line, and the backing vocalists, Pete Townshend (low harmony) and John Entwistle (high harmony), would respond with the refrain "Talkin' 'bout my generation":

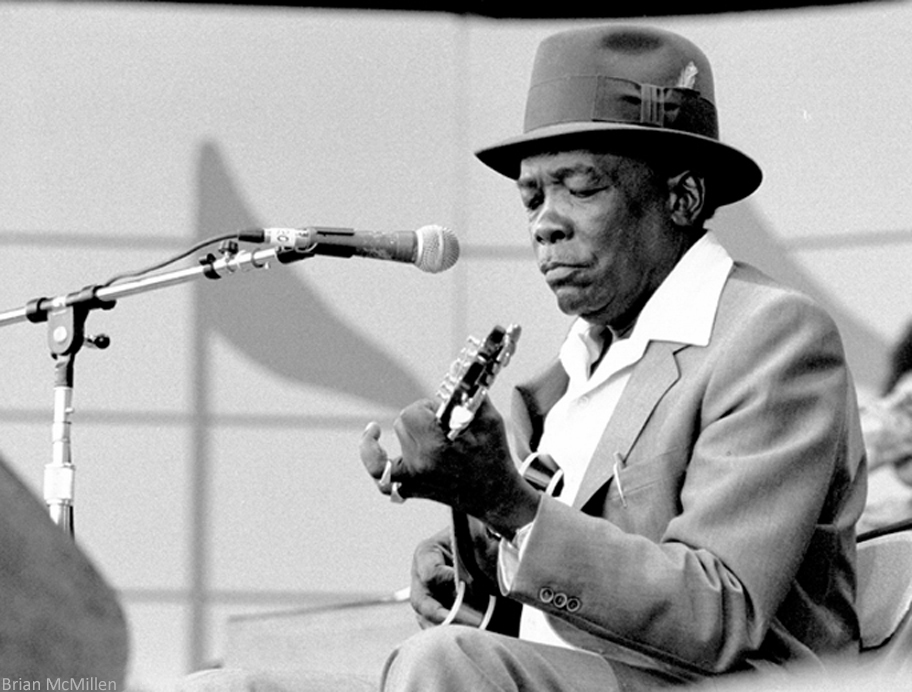
Roger Daltrey's famous lyrical approach in "My Generation" was inspired by bluesman John Lee Hooker

Another salient aspect of "My Generation" is Daltrey's delivery: an angry and frustrated stutter. Various stories exist as to the reason for this distinct delivery. One is that the song began as a slow talking blues number without the stutter (in the 1970s it was sometimes performed as such, but with the stutter, as "My Generation Blues"), but after being inspired by John Lee Hooker's "Stuttering Blues", Townshend reworked the song into its present form. Another reason is that it was suggested to Daltrey that he stutter to sound like a British mod on speed (amphetamines). It is also proposed, albeit less frequently, that the stutter was introduced to give the group a framework for implying an expletive in the lyrics: "Why don't you all fff ... fade away!" However, producer Shel Talmy insisted it was simply "one of those happy accidents" that he thought they should keep. Roger Daltrey has also commented that he had not rehearsed the song prior to the recording, was nervous, and he was unable to hear his own voice through the monitors. The stutter came about as he tried to fit the lyrics to the music, and Talmy decided it worked well enough to keep.

The BBC initially refused to play "My Generation" because it did not want to offend people who stutter, but it reversed its decision after the song became more popular.

== Reception and legacy ==
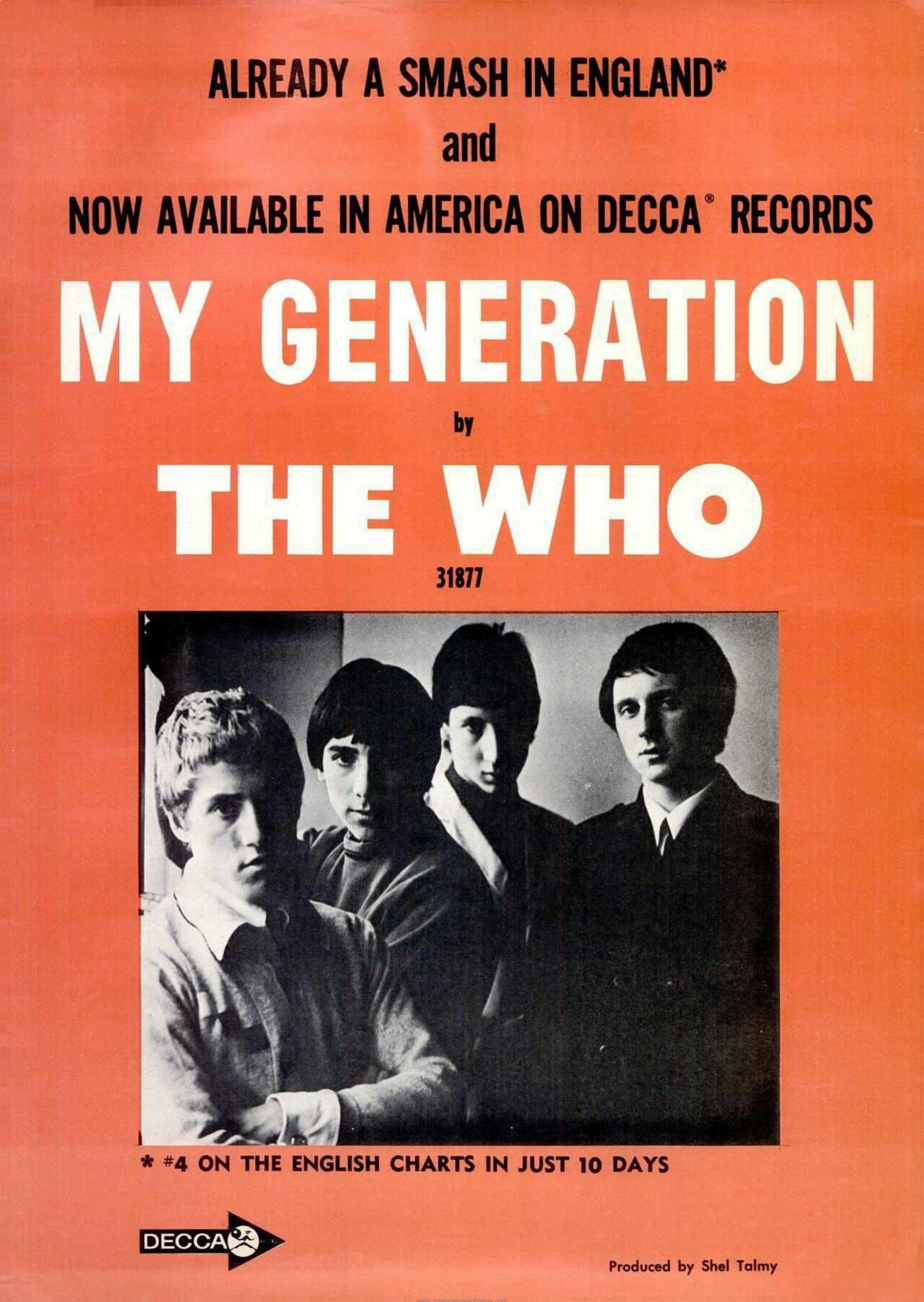
Billboard advertisement, November 20, 1965

The song was released as a single on 29 October 1965, reaching No. 2 in the UK, the Who's highest-charting single in their home country and No. 74 in America. The song has been said by NME to have "encapsulated the angst of being a teenager", and has been characterised as a "nod to the Mod counterculture". NME journalist Larry Bartleet in 2015 rated the Who's recording ten points out of ten. Cash Box described it as a "rollicking, blues-drenched handclapper which sez [sic] that today's kids have more rights than their elders think." Record World said that "The young generation will find that this generates good times."

=== Accolades ===
In 2012, Paste ranked the song number six on their list of the 20 greatest The Who songs, and in 2022, Rolling Stone ranked the song number three on their list of the 50 greatest The Who songs. Rolling Stone named the song the eleventh greatest song on its 500 Greatest Songs of All Time list in 2004 and 2011, re-ranked to number 232 in the 2021 edition. In 2009, VH1 named it the thirty-seventh Greatest Hard Rock Song. It is also part of The Rock and Roll Hall of Fame's 500 Songs that Shaped Rock and Roll and is inducted into the Grammy Hall of Fame for "historical, artistic and significant" value.

== Personnel ==
Credits are according to Pete Townshend.

- Roger Daltrey – lead vocals
- Pete Townshend – electric guitar, backing vocals
- John Entwistle – bass guitar, backing vocals
- Keith Moon – drums

== Charts ==
Chart (1965–1966)	Peak position
Australia (Kent Music Report)	2
Austria (Ö3 Austria Top 40)	9
Canada Top Singles (RPM)	3
Germany (GfK)	6
Ireland (IRMA)	7
Netherlands (Dutch Top 40)	5
Netherlands (Single Top 100)	7
UK Singles (Official Charts)	2
US Billboard Hot 100	74
US Cash Box Top 100	99

Chart (1988)	Peak position
Australia (Kent Music Report)	88

== Certifications ==
Region	Certification	Certified units/sales
United Kingdom (BPI)	Platinum	600,000^{‡}
^{‡} Sales+streaming figures based on certification alone.

== See also ==
- Counterculture of the 1960s
