= Tommy Tour =

1969–1970 tour by the Who

- Tour by The Who
- A tour book for the band's December 1969 English shows, featuring lyrics from "Welcome"
- Location: Europe; North America
- Associated album: Tommy
- Start date: 9 May 1969 (Note: The concert on 1 May 1969 was a private event intended to preview Tommy to the press and is not included in the total number of shows for the tour.)
- End date: 20 December 1970
- Legs: 6
- No. of shows: 91 in North America; 73 in Europe; 187 in total

The Who concert chronology
- The Who Sell Out Tour (1967–1968); Tommy Tour (1969–1970); Who's Next Tour (1971–1972)

The Tommy Tour was a concert tour by the English rock band the Who. It was in support of their fourth album, the rock opera Tommy (1969), and consisted of concerts split between North America and Europe. Following a press reception gig, the tour officially began on 9 May 1969 and ended on 20 December 1970. The set list featured the majority of the songs from Tommy, as well as originals and covers.

After multiple rehearsals and warm-up gigs, the band played a private show at Ronnie Scott's Jazz Club, London in early May 1969 intended to preview Tommy to the press. Subsequently, the band toured North America playing the new album, which was well received by audiences. Following a UK tour, the band played the Tanglewood Music Shed and the Woodstock festival. After Woodstock, the band headlined the second Isle of Wight festival and played Tommy at the Concertgebouw in Amsterdam, one of the world's forefront opera houses. The band continued to tour North America, emphasized by eight shows done over the course of six days at the Fillmore East in New York City. The Who ended 1969 with tour of Europe that continued into 1970, including a show at the London Coliseum on 14 December, which was filmed for a possible future Tommy film.

The group began 1970 by bringing Tommy to various European opera houses. During their tour, the critically acclaimed live album Live at Leeds was recorded during a show at the University of Leeds Refectory, Leeds. After the European tour wrapped up, the band returned to the United States for a tour, starting with two shows at the Metropolitan Opera House, New York City in June. Following the tour, the band played several concerts in Europe, including a headlining appearance at the third Isle of Wight festival in August. The band ended the Tommy Tour with a benefit concert at the Roundhouse in London.

== History ==
The Who's live set changed with the introduction of Pete Townshend's rock opera Tommy, which they had begun recording the previous autumn. After a series of rehearsals and warm-up gigs, the band gave a preview concert to the press at London's Ronnie Scott's Jazz Club on 1 May. Realising the opera's narrative was too difficult to comprehend, Townshend explained a synopsis of the story, before the Who played Tommy at roaring volume. The next day, the band flew to New York to start the North American tour, commencing on 9 May at the Grande Ballroom in Detroit. On 29 May, the band began a three-night residency at Chicago's Kinetic Playground. They noticed the audience would all stand up at the same time, and stay standing, indicating that live performances of Tommy had a positive reaction from audiences. After finishing a series of tour dates in San Francisco during June, the Who flew to London to do two shows for the Royal Albert Hall's Pop Proms concert series. The first show resulted into a fracas involving Teddy Boys who attempted to prevent the band from coming on stage, but the second show went smoothly as the Teds were satisfied with renditions of "Summertime Blues" and "Shakin' All Over". On 10 August, the band suspended their UK tour to do two contracted appearances at the Tanglewood Music Shed and the Woodstock festival.

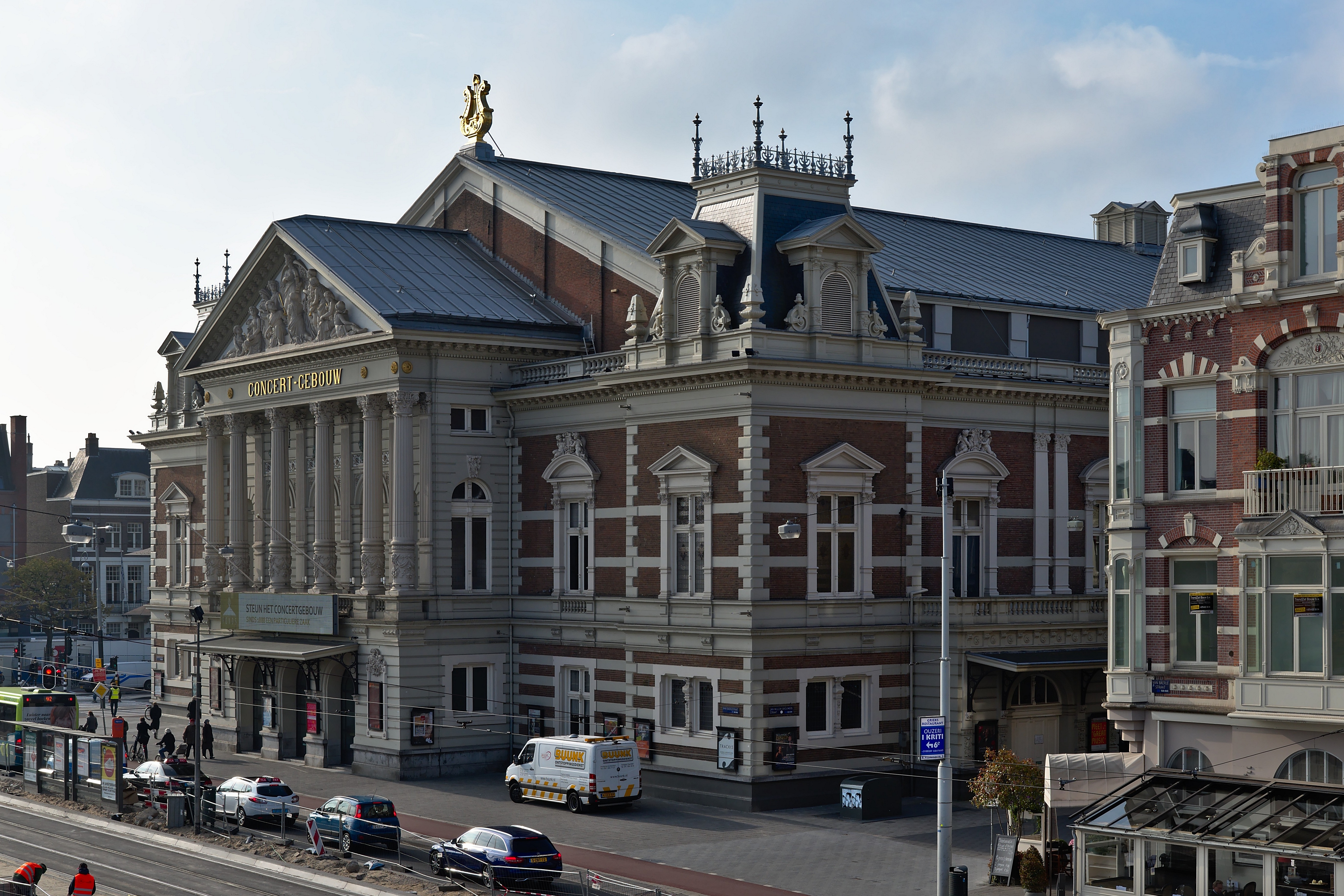
Tommy's "world premiere" took place at the Concertgebouw in Amsterdam.

After playing a show at Tanglewood on 12 August, the band flew to New York to play a set at Woodstock. Due to a fourteen-hour delay, the band became reluctant to play and demanded their $12,500 fee. The Who were scheduled to perform the previous day, 16 August, but the festival ran late and they did not take to the stage until the early hours of the 17th. After the Who played "Pinball Wizard", Yippie founder Abbie Hoffman interrupted the show to protest the arrest of John Sinclair before getting kicked offstage by Townshend, and the sun rose almost as if on cue during "See Me, Feel Me". After returning to England, the band headlined the second Isle of Wight festival on 30 August. Though most media attention focused on Bob Dylan making his first British appearance in three years, the Who stole the show. Townshend later said, "We know that the stage act we had, with Tommy in it, would work under any circumstances, because it had worked many times on tour."

The "world premiere" of Tommy took place on 29 September at the Concertgebouw in Amsterdam, one of the most prestigious opera houses in the world. During the band's entrance, drummer Keith Moon suffered an injury after knocking down two speaker cabinets. The show later became a bootleg recording. The band started another North American tour on 10 October at the Commonwealth Armory in Boston, emphasized by a six-night stand at the Fillmore East in New York City. One show at the Fillmore was attended by Leonard Bernstein, who praised the band for their new music. The Who ended 1969 with a tour of Europe that continued into 1970, including a show at the London Coliseum on 14 December, which was filmed for a possible future Tommy feature.

1970 began with the group bringing Tommy to various European opera houses, a trend they had begun in December 1969 when they performed at the London Coliseum. Included were January stops at the Théâtre des Champs-Élysées in Paris, the Royal Danish Theatre in Copenhagen, and three opera houses in West Germany. The band then focused again on recording a live album. While performances on 14 February at the University of Leeds Refectory and 15 February at Hull City Hall were both recorded, only the Leeds recording was deemed suitable for release, as the bass track was inadvertently not captured during the first few songs at the Hull show. The result was the legendary Live at Leeds, which became a hallmark live rock album.

After beginning recording sessions for a planned new album, the group returned to the United States for a 30-day tour in June and July to support Tommy. In the year since the release of Tommy, the group had become rock superstars and now commanded considerably larger venues than on previous stints in the country, when they played mostly in theatres and colleges. The tour began with the band's final opera house date, as they performed two shows at New York City's Metropolitan Opera House. Following the American tour, the band was one of the headlining acts at the third Isle of Wight festival and embarked on a short European tour shortly afterward. A series of concerts in the United Kingdom followed, the last being a Christmas benefit concert at the Roundhouse in London where they included what was intended to be the last complete performance of Tommy, although it would be played again a few times in 1989. Townshend would lead the group into his Lifehouse vision when they began performing in 1971.

== Personnel ==
- Roger Daltrey – lead vocals, harmonica, tambourine
- Pete Townshend – guitar, vocals
- John Entwistle – bass guitar, vocals
- Keith Moon – drums

== Repertoire ==
The band performed the entirety of Tommy, with the exception of "Cousin Kevin", "Underture", "Sensation" and "Welcome" because they weren't considered suitable for live performance. Aside from the new material, songs such as "Happy Jack", "A Quick One, While He's Away", "Young Man Blues", "Summertime Blues", "My Generation", and "Magic Bus" were featured heavily in the group's stage show, among others. In the autumn, they elected to expand the stage presentation of Tommy further, adding songs like "Overture" and "Sally Simpson" that had been skipped in earlier performances; additionally, show-ending performances of "My Generation" were stretched out to reprise certain parts of the rock opera along with other instrumental passages, such as the chord progression that eventually evolved into "Naked Eye".

While the rock opera remained the focal point of the set into 1970, the band also featured their latest single, "The Seeker" on the 1970 US tour, although it was dropped after two weeks. They also added some material from their in-progress album (eventually abandoned in favour of Townshend's Lifehouse project), performing "Water" and "I Don't Even Know Myself" regularly; "Naked Eye", although unfinished in the studio, was performed in various arrangements on the tour as well, generally during the long show-ending jams during "My Generation".

During the final leg, the set list was the same as on the previous leg, with the exception of "Shakin' All Over" now segueing into the rock standard "Twist and Shout"; the band also stopped including Tommy themes in their long versions of "My Generation" and often moved it into "Naked Eye" and "Magic Bus". They continued to play the same basic set as in August and September, occasionally adding loose versions of Free's "All Right Now" towards the end of the show.

== Films and albums ==
Over the years, several films and albums have been released of the band's concert performances during the Tommy Tour (all are albums, except where noted).

- The Who at Kilburn: 1977 (DVD disc 2: London, 14 December 1969, released 2008)
- Live at Leeds (album containing entire Leeds, 14 February 1970 show, released 1970)
- Live at Hull (Hull, 15 February 1970, released 2012)
- Live at the Isle of Wight Festival 1970 (album Isle of Wight Festival, 29 August 1970, released 1996)
- Live at the Isle of Wight Festival 1970 (film Isle of Wight Festival, 29 August 1970, released 1996)
- Woodstock – Back to the Garden: The Definitive 50th Anniversary Archive (Woodstock, 17 August 1969, released 2019)

Additionally, songs recorded during the tour have been released along with other live and/or studio material:

- Woodstock (1970): "We're Not Gonna Take It", "See Me, Feel Me", "My Generation", "Summertime Blues" (Woodstock, 17 August 1969)
- Woodstock: Music from the Original Soundtrack and More (1970): "See Me, Feel Me" (Woodstock, 17 August 1969)
- The Story of The Who (1976): "My Generation", "Summertime Blues" (Leeds, 14 February 1970)
- The Kids Are Alright (soundtrack, 1979): "Sparks", "Pinball Wizard", "See Me, Feel Me" (Woodstock, 17 August 1969), "Young Man Blues" (London, 14 December 1969), "Happy Jack" (Leeds, 14 February 1970)
- The Kids Are Alright (film, 1979): "Sparks", "Pinball Wizard", "See Me, Feel Me" (Woodstock, 17 August 1969), "Young Man Blues" (London, 14 December 1969),
- Hooligans (1981): "Summertime Blues" (Leeds, 14 February 1970)
- Thirty Years of Maximum R&B (1994): "Sparks", "Abbie Hoffman Incident" (Note: The "Abbie Hoffman Incident" is dialogue of Townshend removing Hoffman from the stage when he attempted an impromptu speech during the middle of the band's set.) (Woodstock, 17 August 1969), "Substitute", "See Me, Feel Me", "Young Man Blues", "Summertime Blues", "Shakin' All Over" (Leeds, 14 February 1970),
- Thirty Years of Maximum R&B Live (1994): "Happy Jack", "I Can't Explain" (London, 14 December 1969), "Heaven and Hell", "I Can't Explain", "Water" (Lenox, 7 July 1970), "Young Man Blues", "I Don't Even Know Myself" (Isle of Wight Festival, 29 August 1970)
- Message to Love (1997): "Young Man Blues", "Naked Eye" (Isle of Wight Festival, 29 August 1970)
- View from a Backstage Pass (2007): "Fortune Teller" (Detroit, 12 October 1969), "Happy Jack", "I'm a Boy", and "A Quick One, While He's Away" (Hull, 15 February 1970)
- Greatest Hits Live (2010): "Magic Bus" (Leeds, 14 February 1970), "Happy Jack", "I'm a Boy" (Hull, 15 February 1970)

== Tour dates ==
=== Preview concert in the UK and North American leg (1 May – 19 June 1969) ===
List of tour dates with date, city, country, venue, references
Date	City	Country	Venue	Ref(s)
1 May 1969	London	England	Ronnie Scott's Jazz Club	
9 May 1969	Detroit	United States	Grande Ballroom	
10 May 1969	Detroit	United States	Grande Ballroom	
11 May 1969	Detroit	United States	Grande Ballroom	
13 May 1969	Boston	United States	Boston Tea Party	
14 May 1969	Boston	United States	Boston Tea Party	
15 May 1969	Boston	United States	Boston Tea Party	
16 May 1969	New York City	United States	Fillmore East	
17 May 1969 (Note: 2 shows have been played.)	New York City	United States	Fillmore East	
18 May 1969	New York City	United States	Fillmore East	
19 May 1969	Toronto	Canada	The Rockpile	
23 May 1969	Philadelphia	United States	Electric Factory	
24 May 1969	Philadelphia	United States	Electric Factory	
25 May 1969	Columbia	United States	Merriweather Post Pavilion	
29 May 1969	Chicago	United States	Kinetic Playground	
30 May 1969	Chicago	United States	Kinetic Playground	
31 May 1969	Chicago	United States	Kinetic Playground	
1 June 1969	St. Louis	United States	Kiel Auditorium	
5 June 1969	New York City	United States	Fillmore East	
6 June 1969	New York City	United States	Fillmore East	
7 June 1969	Lake Geneva	United States	Majestic Hills Theater	
8 June 1969	Minneapolis	United States	Guthrie Theater	
13 June 1969 (Note: The concert on 13 June 1969 was a part of Magic Circus.)	Los Angeles	United States	Hollywood Palladium	
17 June 1969	San Francisco	United States	Fillmore West	
18 June 1969	San Francisco	United States	Fillmore West	
19 June 1969	San Francisco	United States	Fillmore West	

=== UK leg, US contracted appearances, and European tour (5 July – 29 September 1969) ===
List of tour dates with date, city, country, venue, references
Date	City	Country	Venue	Ref(s)
5 July 1969 (Note: The concerts on 5 July 1969 were a part of Pop Proms.)	London	England	Royal Albert Hall	
19 July 1969	Birmingham	England	Mothers	
20 July 1969	Hastings	England	Pier Ballroom	
27 July 1969	Redcar	England	Redcar Jazz Club	
28 July 1969	Sunderland	England	Fillmore North	
2 August 1969	Eastbourne	England	Winter Garden	
3 August 1969	Carlisle	England	Cosmopolitan	
4 August 1969	Bath	England	Bath Pavilion	
7 August 1969	Worthing	England	Assembly Hall	
9 August 1969 (Note: The concert on 9 August 1969 was a part of the National Jazz and Blues Festival.)	Plumpton	England	Plumpton Racecourse	
12 August 1969	Lenox	United States	Tanglewood Music Shed	
17 August 1969 (Note: The concert on 17 August 1969 was a part of the Woodstock festival. The band was scheduled to perform Saturday night, 16 August. However, due to the festival running late, they actually performed Sunday morning, 17 August.)	Bethel	United States	Yasgur Farms	
22 August 1969	Shrewsbury	England	Music Hall	
29 August 1969	Bournemouth	England	Pavilion Theatre	
30 August 1969 (Note: The concert on 30 August 1969 was a part of the Isle of Wight Festival 1969.)	Isle of Wight	England	Woodside Bay	
6 September 1969	Dunfermline	Scotland	Kinema Ballroom	
7 September 1969	Carlisle	England	Cosmopolitan	
13 September 1969	Sutton Coldfield	England	The Belfry	
21 September 1969	Croydon	England	Fairfield Halls	
29 September 1969	Amsterdam	Netherlands	Concertgebouw	

=== North American leg (10 October – 16 November 1969) ===
List of tour dates with date, city, country, venue, references
Date	City	Country	Venue	Ref(s)
10 October 1969	Boston	United States	Commonwealth Armory	
11 October 1969	Detroit	United States	Grande Ballroom	
12 October 1969	Detroit	United States	Grande Ballroom	
14 October 1969	Toronto	Canada	CNE Coliseum	
15 October 1969	Ottawa	Canada	Capitol Theatre	
17 October 1969	Worcester	United States	Holy Cross Field House	
18 October 1969	Stony Brook	United States	Pritchard Gymnasium	
19 October 1969	Philadelphia	United States	Electric Factory	
20 October 1969	New York City	United States	Fillmore East	
21 October 1969	New York City	United States	Fillmore East	
22 October 1969	New York City	United States	Fillmore East	
23 October 1969	New York City	United States	Fillmore East	
24 October 1969	New York City	United States	Fillmore East	
25 October 1969	New York City	United States	Fillmore East	
26 October 1969	Pittsburgh	United States	Syria Mosque	
31 October 1969	Chicago	United States	Kinetic Playground	
1 November 1969	Columbus	United States	Veterans Memorial Auditorium	
2 November 1969	Washington, D.C.	United States	McDonough Gymnasium	
3 November 1969	White Plains	United States	Westchester County Center	
4 November 1969	Hartford	United States	Bushnell Memorial Hall	
6 November 1969 (Note: The concert on 6 November 1969 was a part of the Raccoon Creek Rock Festival.)	Granville	United States	Livingston Gymnasium Indoor Track	
7 November 1969	Athens	United States	Convocation Center	
8 November 1969	St. Louis	United States	Kiel Opera House	
10 November 1969	Albany	United States	Palace Theatre	
11 November 1969	Boston	United States	Boston Tea Party	
12 November 1969	Boston	United States	Boston Tea Party	
13 November 1969	New Paltz	United States	Elting Gymnasium	
14 November 1969	Cleveland	United States	Music Hall	
15 November 1969	Buffalo	United States	Kleinhans Music Hall	
16 November 1969	Syracuse	United States	Onondaga County War Memorial	

=== European leg (4 December 1969 – 16 May 1970) ===
List of tour dates with date, city, country, venue, references
Date	City	Country	Venue	Ref(s)
4 December 1969	Bristol	England	Bristol Hippodrome	
5 December 1969	Manchester	England	Palace Theatre	
12 December 1969	Liverpool	England	Liverpool Empire Theatre	
14 December 1969	London	England	London Coliseum	
19 December 1969	Newcastle upon Tyne	England	Newcastle City Hall	
16 January 1970	Paris	France	Théâtre des Champs-Élysées	
17 January 1970	Paris	France	Théâtre des Champs-Élysées	
24 January 1970	Copenhagen	Denmark	Royal Danish Theatre	
26 January 1970	Cologne	West Germany	Opernhaus	
27 January 1970	Hamburg	West Germany	Opernhaus	
28 January 1970	West Berlin	West Germany	Deutschland Stadt Opera House	
30 January 1970	Amsterdam	Netherlands	Concertgebouw	
14 February 1970	Leeds	England	University of Leeds Refectory	
15 February 1970	Kingston upon Hull	England	Hull City Hall	
18 April 1970	Leicester	England	University of Leicester	
25 April 1970	Nottingham	England	Portland Building	
27 April 1970	Dunstable	England	Dunstable Civic Hall	
1 May 1970	Exeter	England	Great Hall	
2 May 1970	Sheffield	England	University of Sheffield	
8 May 1970	Kent	England	Eliot College	
9 May 1970	Manchester	England	Manchester University	
15 May 1970	Lancaster	England	Lancaster University	
16 May 1970	York	England	Derwent College	

=== US leg (7 June – 7 July 1970) ===
List of tour dates with date, city, country, venue, references
Date	City	Country	Venue	Ref(s)
7 June 1970	New York City	United States	Metropolitan Opera House	
9 June 1970	Denver	United States	Mammoth Gardens	
10 June 1970	Denver	United States	Mammoth Gardens	
13 June 1970	San Diego	United States	Golden Hall	
14 June 1970	Anaheim	United States	Anaheim Stadium	
15 June 1970	Berkeley	United States	Berkeley Community Theatre	
16 June 1970	Berkeley	United States	Berkeley Community Theatre	
19 June 1970	Dallas	United States	Dallas Memorial Auditorium	
20 June 1970	Houston	United States	Hofheinz Pavilion	
21 June 1970	Memphis	United States	Ellis Auditorium	
22 June 1970	Atlanta	United States	Municipal Auditorium	
24 June 1970	Philadelphia	United States	Spectrum	
25 June 1970	Cincinnati	United States	Cincinnati Music Hall	
26 June 1970	Cincinnati	United States	Cincinnati Music Hall	
27 June 1970	Cleveland	United States	Public Auditorium	
29 June 1970	Columbia	United States	Merriweather Post Pavilion	
1 July 1970	Chicago	United States	Auditorium Theatre	
2 July 1970	Kansas City	United States	Freedom Palace	
3 July 1970	Minneapolis	United States	Minneapolis Auditorium	
4 July 1970	Chicago	United States	Auditorium Theatre	
5 July 1970	Detroit	United States	Cobo Arena	
7 July 1970	Lenox	United States	Tanglewood Music Shed	

=== European leg (25 July – 20 December 1970) ===
List of tour dates with date, city, country, venue, references
Date	City	Country	Venue	Ref(s)
25 July 1970	Dunstable	England	Dunstable Civic Hall	
8 August 1970	Sutton Coldfield	England	The Belfry	
24 August 1970	Wolverhampton	England	Wolverhampton Civic Hall	
29 August 1970 (Note: The concert on 29 August 1970 was a part of the Isle of Wight Festival 1970.)	Isle of Wight	England	East Afton Farm	
12 September 1970	Münster	West Germany	Halle Münsterland	
13 September 1970	Offenbach am Main	West Germany	Stadthalle Offenbach	
16 September 1970	Rotterdam	Netherlands	De Doelen	
17 September 1970	Amsterdam	Netherlands	Concertgebouw	
18 September 1970	Rotterdam	Netherlands	De Doelen	
20 August 1970	Copenhagen	Denmark	Falkoner Teatret	
21 August 1970	Aarhus	Denmark	Vejlby-Risskov Hallen	
6 October 1970	Cardiff	Wales	Sophia Gardens Pavilion	
7 October 1970	Manchester	England	Free Trade Hall	
8 October 1970	London	England	Orchid Ballroom	
10 October 1970	Brighton	England	Old Refectory	
11 October 1970	Birmingham	England	Birmingham Odeon	
13 October 1970	Leeds	England	Locarno Ballroom	
18 October 1970	London	England	Lewisham Odeon	
22 October 1970	Stockton-on-Tees	England	ABC Cinemas	
23 October 1970	Glasgow	Scotland	Green's Playhouse	
24 October 1970	Sheffield	England	University of Sheffield	
25 October 1970	Liverpool	England	Liverpool Empire Theatre	
26 October 1970	Stoke-on-Trent	England	Trentham Ballroom	
27 October 1970	Norwich	England	University of East Anglia	
29 October 1970	London	England	Hammersmith Palais	
21 November 1970	Leeds	England	University of Leeds Refectory	
28 November 1970	Coventry	England	Lanchester Polytechnic	
5 December 1970	Norwich	England	Lads' Club	
15 December 1970	Newcastle upon Tyne	England	Mayfair Ballroom	
16 December 1970	Scarborough	England	Futurist Theatre	
20 December 1970	London	England	Roundhouse	

== See also ==
- List of The Who tours and performances
