= The Pirates (band) =

British pub rock band (1976–2010)

- Origin: London, England
- Genres: Pub rock, punk rock, rock and roll
- Years active: 1976–2010
- Spinoff of: Johnny Kidd & the Pirates
- Past members: Johnny Spence; Mick Green; Frank Farley; Peter Taylor; BJ Anders; Romek Parol; Mike Roberts

The Pirates was a British pub rock band and a continuation of the 1960s rock and roll group Johnny Kidd & the Pirates, which originally lasted from 1959 until Kidd's death in 1966. In 1976, a new version of Johnny Kidd & the Pirates, including former band mates Mick Green, Johnny Spence, and Frank Farley formed, which toured in different variations until Green's death in 2010.

== History ==
=== Johnny Kidd & the Pirates ===
Johnny Kid & the Pirates originally formed in London in 1959 by Frederick Albert Heath aka Johnny Kidd. In 1960, the band, which included future Tornados members Clem Cattini and Alan Caddy, scored a number one in the UK with "Shakin' All Over. They had a total of six UK top 40s between 1959 and 1963, including "I'll Never Get Over You", their second highest UK charting single, which peaked at number four in 1963. Johnny Kidd & the Pirates ended on 8 October 1966, Kidd was killed in a car crash aged 30.

=== The Pirates ===
In 1976, Mick Green, Johnny Spence, and Frank Farley, all of whom had backed Kidd in the 1960s, formed The Pirates, as a continuation of the original band. Spence and Farley had both joined Kidd in 1961, and remained until 1966, and Green had joined in 1962 and left in 1964 to join The Dakotas. The Pirates performed the songs of Johnny Kidd in a pub rock / punk rock style.

Their first two singles were re-recordings of the bands hits "Shakin' All Over" (1976) and "I'll Never Get Over You" (1977). Their first album, the live album Out of their Skulls, was released in 1977 and went to number 57 on the UK album charts. They toured with bands such as The Saints and The Stranglers. On 17 September 1977, they performed live on the BBC Radio 1 radio show In Concert, with Clayson and the Agronauts.

After disbanding in 1983, and making occasional performances, they returned full time again in 1994. In 2002, they performed "Shakin' All Over" and "Honey Hush" on Top of the Pops 2.

Farley retired in 2005. They continued to tour until Mick Green died in January 2010. Farley died on 28 April 2018.

== Members ==
- Johnny Spence – lead vocals, bass (1976–2010) (Johnny Kidd band member 1961–1966)
- Mick Green – guitar (1976–2010; died 2010) (Johnny Kidd band member 1962–1964)
- Frank Farley – drums (1976–2005; died 2018) (Johnny Kidd band member 1961–1966)
- Peter Taylor – lead vocals, percussion (1993–1994)
- BJ Anders – bass, vocals (1994–99)
- Romek Parol – drums (1994–99)
- Mike Roberts – drums (2005–10)

== Discography ==
=== Albums ===
| Year | Title | UK |
|---|---|---|
| 1977 | Out of their Skulls | 57 |
| 1978 | Skull Wars | |
| 1979 | Happy Birthday Rock 'n' Roll | |
| 1981 | A Fistful Of Dubloons | |
| 1988 | Still Shakin' | |
| 1992 | Sailing Through France | |

=== Singles ===
| Year | Month | Label | A-side | B-side | Notes |
|---|---|---|---|---|---|
| 1977 | 16 September | Warner Records | "Sweet Love on My Mind" (Live) | "You Don't Own Me" / "Don't München It" | |
| 1978 | 17 March | Warner Records | "All In It Together" | "Dr. Feelgood" | |
| 1978 | May | Warner Records | "Johnny B. Goode's Good" | "Johnny B. Goode" | |
| 1978 | 20 October | Warner Records | "Shakin' All Over" | "Saturday Night Shoot Out" | |
| 1979 | ? | Cube Records | "Venture Cafe Rock" | | Released on Flexi disc |
| 1979 | ? | Sound For Industry | "All By Myself" | "Cat Clothes" | Released on Flexi disc |
| 1979 | 21 September | Cube Records | "Golden Oldies" | "Mercy Pirate" | |
| 1979 | October | Sound For Industry | "The Pirates Talking About Happy Birthday Rock 'N' Roll" | | Released on Flexi disc |
| 1979 | 2 November | Cube Records | "Lady (Put The Light On Me)" | "Lemonade" | |
| 2006 | April | Prism Leisure Corporation | "Ugly Millionaire" | "Shakin' All Over" | |
