= Live at the Isle of Wight Festival 1970 (film) =

- Directed by: Murray Lerner
- Produced by: Murray Lerner; Bill Curbishley; Robert Rosenberg
- Starring: The Who; Roger Daltrey; John Entwistle; Keith Moon; Pete Townshend
- Music by: The Who
- Production company: Eagle Rock
- Distributed by: Eagle Rock
- Release dates: 3 November 1998 (U.S.); 26 June 2000 (UK)
- Running time: 85 minutes
- Language: English

Live at the Isle of Wight Festival 1970 is an 85-minute concert film of the Who's performance at the Isle of Wight Festival 1970. While the concert occurred on 30 August 1970 at 2:00 am, a VHS cassette was not released until 1996. A 112-minute compact disc of the full concert was also released in 1996. The concert was re-released on DVD in 1998 in the United States and 2006 in the United Kingdom.

== Songs performed in the film ==
1. "Heaven and Hell"
2. "I Can't Explain"
3. "Young Man Blues"
4. "I Don't Even Know Myself"
5. "Water"
6. "Shakin' All Over / Spoonful / Twist and Shout (Medley)"
7. "Summertime Blues"
8. "My Generation"
9. "Magic Bus"
10. "Overture"
11. "It's a Boy"
12. "Eyesight to the Blind (The Hawker)"
13. "Christmas"
14. "The Acid Queen"
15. "Pinball Wizard"
16. "Do You Think It's Alright?"
17. "Fiddle About"
18. "Go to the Mirror!"
19. "Miracle Cure"
20. "I'm Free"
21. "We're Not Gonna Take It"
22. "Tommy Can You Hear Me?"

== Special features ==
The DVD re-release features "Substitute" and "Naked Eye" as special features. These songs were performed at the concert and were not featured on the original video release of the concert. "Naked Eye" had previously been released as part of Message to Love, a DVD released in 1997 as a compilation of songs performed at the Isle of Wight Festival 1970 that was also directed by Murray Lerner. Also included as a special feature is a 40-minute interview by Pete Townshend.

== Certifications ==
Region	Certification	Certified units/sales
Australia (ARIA)	Gold	7,500^{^}
^{^} Shipments figures based on certification alone.
