= Live at the Isle of Wight Festival 1970 (The Who album) =

Live at the Isle of Wight Festival

Live album by the Who
- Released: 29 October 1996
- Recorded: 29 August 1970
- Venues: East Afton Farm, Isle of Wight, England, UK
- Genres: Rock; hard rock
- Length: 112:19
- Label: Columbia/Legacy
- Producers: Jon Astley, Andy Macpherson

The Who chronology
My Generation: The Very Best of The Who (1996)	Live at the Isle of Wight Festival (1996)	BBC Sessions (2000)

Live at the Isle of Wight Festival is a live album by the English rock band the Who, recorded at the Isle of Wight Festival on 29 August 1970, released in 1996 as a double CD in the United States and then in 2001 in both double CD and triple vinyl formats in the United Kingdom. A shorter film of the concert was also released in 1996, in VHS and DVD formats.

== Overview ==
The Who were one year and three months into their Tommy tour when they played their second engagement at the Isle of Wight Festival. As in 1969, they played most of their famous rock opera Tommy, which by this time was quite familiar to the festival crowd. Huge spotlights bathed the audience of between 600,000 and 700,000 attendees (according to the Guinness Book of Records) and as the Who's tour manager John Woolf recalls, attracted "every moth and flying nocturnal animal on the island". The Who started their set at 2:00 A.M.

By August 1970, Pete Townshend was already introducing new songs to the setlist including "Water", "I Don't Even Know Myself" and "Naked Eye". These songs, which were being recorded at the time of the festival, were intended for an upcoming project known as Lifehouse. Although Lifehouse was eventually abandoned, the sessions paved the way to the Who's classic album Who's Next.

The Who also performed some live staples such as "Substitute", "My Generation", "Magic Bus", "I Can't Explain", and the perennial covers of "Shakin' All Over" and "Summertime Blues".

Professional ratings
Review scores
Source	Rating
AllMusic	4.5/5 stars
Robert Christgau	C+
The Encyclopedia of Popular Music	4/5 stars
MusicHound	4.5/5
Rolling Stone	(favourable)

== Track listing ==
All songs were written by Pete Townshend except where noted.

Disc one

No.	Title	Writer(s)	Original album	Length
1.	"Heaven and Hell"	John Entwistle	B-side	5:16
2.	"I Can't Explain"		single	2:45
3.	"Young Man Blues"	Mose Allison	cover	6:06
4.	"I Don't Even Know Myself"		B-side	6:11
5.	"Water"		B-side	10:53
6.	"Overture"		Tommy	5:08
7.	"It's a Boy"		Tommy	1:33
8.	"1921"		Tommy	2:27
9.	"Amazing Journey"		Tommy	3:19
10.	"Sparks"		Tommy	5:10
11.	"Eyesight to the Blind (The Hawker)"	Sonny Boy Williamson II	Tommy	1:58
12.	"Christmas"		Tommy	3:25

Disc two

No.	Title	Writer(s)	Original album	Length
1.	"The Acid Queen"		Tommy	3:41
2.	"Pinball Wizard"		Tommy	2:50
3.	"Do You Think It's Alright?"		Tommy	0:22
4.	"Fiddle About"	John Entwistle	Tommy	1:15
5.	"Tommy Can You Hear Me?"		Tommy	0:58
6.	"There's a Doctor"		Tommy	0:22
7.	"Go to the Mirror!"		Tommy	3:32
8.	"Smash the Mirror"		Tommy	1:16
9.	"Miracle Cure"		Tommy	0:13
10.	"I'm Free"		Tommy	2:24
11.	"Tommy's Holiday Camp"	Keith Moon	Tommy	1:01
12.	"We're Not Gonna Take It"		Tommy	9:37
13.	"Summertime Blues"	Eddie Cochran, Jerry Capehart	cover	3:24
14.	"Shakin' All Over/Spoonful/Twist and Shout"	Johnny Kidd/Willie Dixon/Phil Medley, Bert Russell	cover	6:27
15.	"Substitute"		single	2:10
16.	"My Generation"		My Generation	7:15
17.	"Naked Eye"		Odds and Sods	6:33
18.	"Magic Bus"		single	4:35

== Personnel ==
The Who

- Roger Daltrey – lead vocals, tambourine, harmonica.
- Pete Townshend – lead guitar and vocals
- John Entwistle – bass guitar, vocals
- Keith Moon – drums, percussion, vocals

== Charts ==
Chart (1996)	Peak position
UK Albums (Official Charts)	84
US Billboard 200	194
