= Johnny Kidd & the Pirates =

English rock and roll group (1959–1966)

- Origin: London, England
- Genres: Rock and roll; rhythm and blues; beat
- Years active: 1959–1966 (as Johnny Kidd & the Pirates); 1976–2010 (as the Pirates)
- Label: His Master's Voice
- Spinoffs: The Pirates
- Past members: Johnny Kidd; Alan Caddy; Brian Gregg; Joe Moretti; Clem Cattini; Frank Farley; Johnny Spence; Mick Green; Johnny Patto; Vic Cooper; John Weider; John Moreshead; Mick Stewart; Roger "Truth" Pinner; Ray Soper; Nick Simper; Johnny Carroll; John Kerrison; BJ Anders; Romrk Parol; Mike Roberts; Billy Knaggs; Mike Rudzinski; Les Hall; John Gustafson
- Website: www.johnnykidd.co.uk www.thepirates.co.uk

Johnny Kidd & the Pirates (known simply as the Pirates after their reunion) were an English rock band led by singer/songwriter Johnny Kidd. From 1959 to the mid-1960s they achieved considerable success with hit songs like "Shakin' All Over" and "Please Don't Touch".

Their stage act was theatrical, like their rock 'n' roll contemporaries such as Screaming Lord Sutch & the Savages and Nero and the Gladiators. The group disbanded after Kidd's death in a 1966 car accident. Former members of the band reunited as the Pirates, and continued performing until the late 2000s.

== Early days ==
The original group came under the management of Guy Robinson and was signed to His Master's Voice in 1959 under the auspices of producer Walter J. Ridley. Their first single was the raw "Please Don't Touch", penned by Kidd. This became a minor hit, reaching number 25 on the UK singles charts in 1959.

When the group appeared on Saturday Club between 1959 and 1961, Mike West and Tom Brown shared the vocals with Kidd.

== "Shakin' All Over" ==
Kidd and the Pirates' most famous song was "Shakin' All Over", memorable for opening guitars and solo from Joe Moretti. It reached number one in the UK singles charts in 1960. The song and the group's proto-power trio line-up both made a strong impression on the Who, who would cover it in their 1970 album Live at Leeds, whose CD liner notes proclaim the original to be the UK's best pre-Beatles rock single. A cover version by Canada's The Guess Who reached No. 1 in their home country and skirted the US Top 20 in early 1965.

The swansong recording of this line-up in 1961, "Please Don't Bring Me Down", failed to chart. However, it featured a B-side which turned out to be a minor UK rock 'n' roll classic. "So What" featured a piano solo from Morgan "Thunderclap" Jones. When the single failed to chart, the Pirates—Clem Cattini, Alan Caddy and Brian Gregg—jumped ship and joined Colin Hicks as his "Cabin Boys" on a six-week tour to Europe. After this liaison, Cattini and Caddy joined a Joe Meek backing band who evolved into the Tornados. Kidd meanwhile cut a "solo" single backed by a bigger band sound. "Hurry on Back to Love" was more bluesy than anything Kidd had previously attempted and indicated a possible new musical path.

A new Pirate trio was recruited. Johnny Spence (born 26 January 1942, bass), Frank Farley (drums) and Johnny Patto (lead guitar) had recently backed Cuddly Dudley as "The Redcaps". Patto soon left and was replaced by Mick Green (lead guitar), who had also backed Dudley. The new line-up's first single with Kidd, "A Shot Of Rhythm And Blues" (coupled with "I Can Tell"), broke Kidd's dry spell, entering the lower reaches of the chart toward the end of 1962. In retrospect this disc, which debuted Green's unique playing style incorporating alternating lead and rhythm guitar figures, can be viewed as the sonic bridge marking the transition of British rock and roll into British beat.

Over time, Kidd developed a visual show. The group would deck out in 19th-century pirate costume in front of a huge backcloth of a pirate galleon, with Kidd toying with a cutlass. A projected single in keeping with the new sound, "Some Other Guy", was left unreleased in early 1963, allowing The Big Three to score their first chart entry. The explosive rise of the 'beat groups' in 1963 outshone the slow-burning R&B scene; without a single release, Kidd and his Pirates were losing valuable momentum on the chart front.

Kidd responded by recording Gordon Mills' "I'll Never Get Over You", originally a Buddy Holly–styled B-side issued by Mills' erstwhile group The Viscounts and reaching number 4 on the UK chart in the summer of 1963. The follow-up, "Hungry For Love", was also written by Mills and broke into the top twenty during the autumn, fending off a competing EP version by The Searchers. The "Hungry For Love" recording session was very productive, also yielding a Pirates-only single. Both sides, "My Babe" and "Casting My Spell", featuring Spence on vocals, were recorded in one take each, a sign of this Pirates line-up's power, ability and confidence. According to Mick Green, this single was issued to test the waters whether Kidd and the Pirates could be split into two successful acts; however, the single was not a hit, which put a stop to any further experiments on this front.

== The later days ==
In 1964, the Pirates added organist Vic Cooper (born 13 December 1943 in Devon) to their line-up. The hits again tailed away and the long-awaited debut album, featuring the expanded line-up with Vic Cooper on organ/piano duties, was never mastered for release. One step behind the Beatles and losing ground, Kidd abandoned dual-tracking his powerful voice and switched back to R&B, where his vocal strengths lay. After 1964's "Always And Ever" (based on “Santa Lucia”), Mick Green left during the summer season at Blackpool and joined Billy J. Kramer and the Dakotas. The Tornadoes were on the same bill in Blackpool, so their guitarist Stuart Taylor filled in until Kidd found John Weider, a fan of Green's, to come aboard.

Eventually the group parted company with Kidd. Johnny Spence, Frank Farley and guitarist Jon Morshead (who replaced Weider) continued as The Pirates (keeping the name with Kidd's blessing) and recorded one single, "Shades of Blue", for Polydor before a lack of success calling it a day in mid-1966. Kidd, meanwhile, kept recording and gigging with an anonymous group of backing musicians. His penultimate single, "It's Got to Be You", and an unreleased version of Otis Redding's "I Can't Turn You Loose" showed that a mix of R&B and soul may have been where his future musical path lay.

In 1966, one of the anonymous musicians, organist Ray Soaper contacted some mates. Mick Stewart (lead guitar), Nick Simper (bass) and Roger Truth (drums) came together with Soper and presented themselves to Kidd as his new Pirates. With his newly christened "New Pirates" (necessarily distinguishing them from the other "Pirates"), a revitalised Kidd worked towards a comeback to the point he spoke about the possibility of recording a new album. On returning from a cancelled gig at the Imperial in Nelson, he was killed in a car accident near Bury, Lancashire, on 7 October 1966, with companion Nick Simper being injured.

The group had a new single, "Send For That Girl" (coupled with a version of the Lee Hazlewood–written "The Fool"), which was released posthumously in November but failed to chart. This line-up of the Pirates (with John Kerrison replacing Truth at late notice) carried on in tribute once Simper had recovered, though there were no further recordings. As the pop scene changed and bookings became harder to obtain, the group split in May 1967.

== Post-Kidd – The Pirates ==
The best-known line-up of the Pirates, and also the only line-up ever given Johnny Kidd's blessing to retain and to record under the name "The Pirates" (Mick Green, Johnny Spence and Frank Farley), re-formed in 1976. They released four albums: Out of Their Skulls (1977), reaching number 57 in the UK Albums Chart, Skull Wars (1978), Happy Birthday Rock'n'Roll (1979) and A Fistful of Dubloons (1981). These contained some original songs, but mostly R’n’R/R&B classics. Out of Their Skulls and Skull Wars featured a mixture of live and studio tracks.

They played at Front Row Festival, a three-week event at the Hope and Anchor, Islington in late 1977, which resulted in the band's inclusion, alongside Wilko Johnson, The Only Ones, The Saints, the Stranglers, X-Ray Spex, and XTC, on a hit double album of recordings from the festival. The Hope & Anchor Front Row Festival compilation LP (1978) reached number 28 in the UK Albums Chart. The original line-up featuring Spence, Green and Farley also had two tracks on each of compilation albums It’s Rock’n’Roll (1977) and The London R & B Sessions (1980).

This line-up did its final gig in 1983 (until re-forming for the third time in 1999, releasing Live In Japan 2000 (2002)). After 1983, The Pirates kept going on every now and then with various lines-up, always including Mick Green, in the 1980s and early 1990s with John Gustafson (The Big Three, Roxy Music) on bass and vocals with different drummers. Then, in 1996–1998, they appeared with Björn Anders (bass/vocals) and Romek Parol (drums), before re-forming with the Green, Spence and Farley line-up in 1999, which continued to perform until 2005. Due to ill health, Frank Farley retired from the live circuit in 2005, to be replaced by Mike Roberts. With Mike Roberts, Johnny Spence and Mick Green, they continued a few more years.

Since the break-up in 1983, albums were mostly made under the name Pirates, with various line-ups, such as Still Shakin' (1987), with John Gustafson playing bass and taking care of vocal duties; Land of the Blind with the Green-Anders-Parol line-up, which was released in 1998; and Skullduggery by the Green, Spence and Roberts line-up in 2006. The band dissolved on the death of Mick Green in January 2010.

Since then, Anders and Parol have formed a new band, The Spellkasters, in 2013 with new frontman Pete Edmunds. An album, Kastin' The Spell, was recorded in Anders' Swedish studio for release on Angel Air Records in February 2014. The album contains new versions of Pirates tracks—"Gibson Martin Fender", "Don't Munchen It" and "Going Back Home"—that Mick Green co-wrote with Wilko Johnson. The Spellkasters started a worldwide tour in March 2014.

Original bass player and vocalist of the Pirates trio Johnny Spence is still touring and recording, with a Finnish rock and roll and rhythm & blues trio Doctor's Order. Their co-operation started in 2008; most of the concerts and tours have been in Finland, but they also performed at the International Gastro Blues Festival in Hungary in 2012. Johnny Spence and Doctor's Order have made two albums, Full Throttle No Brakes (2009) and Hot and Rockin' (2011), both on Goofin' Records. Mick Green also recorded a six-track mini-album, Cutthroat and Dangerous, with Doctor's Order, which was released in 2007, also on Goofin' Records.

Another set of Pirates, with Joe Moretti (guitar), and re-uniting original Pirates Brian Gregg (bass) and Clem Cattini (drums), has also played occasional gigs in recent years. Moretti played on "Shakin' All Over" and its follow-up "Restless". However, this Pirates line-up has Joe Moretti's son, also called Joe Moretti, on guitar.

== Deaths ==
- Johnny Kidd (born 23 December 1935) died in a car crash on 8 October 1966, aged 30.
- Johnny Carroll (born 23 October 1937) died from liver failure on 13 January 1995, aged 57.
- Alan Caddy (born 2 February 1940) died on 16 August 2000, aged 60.
- Mick Green (born 22 February 1944) died from heart failure on 11 January 2010, aged 65.
- Frank Farley (born 18 February 1942) died on 28 April 2018, aged 76.
- Brian Gregg (born 31 January 1939) died on 21 April 2024, aged 85.
- John Moreshead (born 17 November 1942 in Calcutta) died 3 March 2025, aged 82.
- John Weider (born 21 April 1947) died in March 2025, aged 77.
- Clem Cattini (born 20 August 1937) died on 2 November 2026

== Legacy ==
The B-side of Johnny Kidd & the Pirates' 1964 single "Always and Ever" was a cover of "Dr Feelgood" by the American blues pianist and singer Willie Perryman (also known as "Piano Red"), who recorded the song as "Dr Feelgood & the Interns". The name of the song is slang for heroin. The band Dr. Feelgood took their name from the Johnny Kidd & the Pirates recording.

== Former members ==
=== Johnny Kidd & the Pirates (1959–1966) ===
- Johnny Kidd (Frederick Heath) – vocals (1959–66; his death)
- Mike West – backing vocals (1959-60)
- Tom Brown – backing vocals (1959-60)
- Johnny Gordon – bass (1959)
- Ken McKay – drums (1959)
- Tony Doherty – guitar (1959)
- Alan Caddy – lead guitar (1959–61; died 2000)
- Brian Gregg – bass (1959–61; died 2024)
- Clem Cattini – drums (1959–61; died 2026)
- Frank Farley – drums (1961–66, 1976–2005)
- Johnny Spence – bass (1961–66, 1976–2010)
- Johnny Patto – guitar (1962)
- Mick Green – guitar (1962–64, 1976–2010; died 2010)
- Vic Cooper – piano, organ (1964–66)
- John Weider – guitar (1964–65)
- John Moreshead – guitar (1965–66)
- Roger "Truth" Pinner – drums (1966)
- Ray Soper – piano, organ (1966)
- Billy Knaggs – guitar (1966)
- Mike Rudzinski – bass, vocals (1966)
- Les Hall – drums (1966)
- Mick Stewart – guitar, vocals (1966)
- Paulie Raymond – guitar (1966)
- Nick Simper – bass, vocals (1966)
- Johnny Carroll – keyboards, vocals (1966; died 1995)
- John Kerrison – drums (1966)

=== New Pirates (1966–1967) ===
- Paulie Raymond – guitar (1966–67)
- Mick Stewart – guitar, vocals (1966–67)
- Nick Simper – bass, vocals (1966–67)
- Johnny Carroll – keyboards, vocals (1966–67; died 1995)
- John Kerrison – drums (1966–67)

=== The Pirates (1976–2010) ===
- Mick Green – guitar (1976–2010; died 2010)
- Johnny Spence – bass (1976–2010)
- Frank Farley – drums (1976–2005)
- Peter Taylor – lead vocals, percussion (1993–1994)
- BJ Anders – bass, vocals (1994–99)
- Romek Parol – drums (1994–99)
- Mike Roberts – drums (2005–10)

== Spin-off bands ==
=== The (New) Pirates (1976) ===
- Nick Simper – bass/vocals (1976)
- Roger "Truth" Pinner – drums (1976)

=== Kidd Kane & the Pirates (2005) ===
- Kidd Kane – vocals (2005)
- Joe Moretti Jnr – guitar (2005)
- Brian Gregg – bass (2005, original Pirates member)
- Clem Cattini – drums (2005, original Pirates member)

=== Johnny Spence & Doctors Order ===
==== Current members ====
- Johnny Spence – vocals (2008–present; original Pirates member)
- Teppo "Teddy Bear" Nättilä – bass/vocals (1998–present)
- Arto "Grande-Archie" Hämäläinen – guitar (1998–present)
- Kimmo "Mighty Man" Oikarinen – drums (2007–present)

Kaj Erik Ensio Takamäki plays harmonica on all the albums

==== Former members ====
- Timo "Madman" Väätäinen – drums (1998–2003)
- Harri "Dirty Harry" Tuominen – drums (2003–2007)

== Discography ==
=== as Johnny Kidd & the Pirates ===
==== Extended plays ====
- Shakin' All Over EP: "Please Don't Touch" / "Shakin' All Over" b/w "Restless" / "You Got What It Takes" (Dec 1960) (His Master's Voice 7EG 8628)
- Johnny Kidd EP: "I'll Never Get Over You" / "Then I Got Everything" b/w "Hungry for Love" / "A Shot of Rhythm and Blues" (Dec 1963) (His Master's Voice 7EG 8834)

Singles

Year	Month	Label	A-side	B-side	UK	Notes
1959	May	His Master's Voice	"Please Don't Touch"	"Growl"	25	Code 45-POP 615
1959	December	His Master's Voice	"If You Were the Only Girl in the World"	"Feelin'"		Code 45-POP 674 / A-side credited to Johnny Kidd with Chorus and Orchestra)
1960	January	His Master's Voice	"You Got What It Takes"	"Longin' Lips"	25	Code 45-POP 698
1960	June	His Master's Voice	"Shakin' All Over"	"Yes Sir, That's My Baby"	1	Code 45-POP 753
1960	September	His Master's Voice	"Restless"	"Magic of Love"	22	Code 45-POP 790
1961	March	His Master's Voice	"Linda Lu"	"Let's Talk About Us"	47	Code 45-POP 853
1961	September	His Master's Voice	"Please Don't Bring Me Down"	"So What"		Code 45-POP 919
1962	January	His Master's Voice	"Hurry On Back to Love"	"I Want That"		Code 45-POP 978 / both sides credited to Johnny Kidd with The Michael Sammes Singers and Orchestra
1962	November	His Master's Voice	"A Shot of Rhythm and Blues"	"I Can Tell"	48	Code 45-POP 1088
1963	June	His Master's Voice	"I'll Never Get Over You"	"Then I Got Everything"	4	Code POP 1173
1963	November	His Master's Voice	"Hungry for Love"	"Ecstasy"	20	Code POP 1228
1964	April	His Master's Voice	"Always and Ever"	"Dr. Feelgood"	46	Code POP 1269
1964	June	His Master's Voice	"Jealous Girl"	"Shop Around"		Code POP 1309
1964	October	His Master's Voice	"Whole Lotta Woman"	"Your Cheatin' Heart"		Code POP 1353
1965	February	His Master's Voice	"The Birds and the Bees"	"Don't Make the Same Mistake As I Did"		Code POP 1397
1965	May	His Master's Voice	"Shakin' All Over" (New Recording)	"Gotta Travel On"		Code POP 1424
1966	April		"It's Gotta Be You"	"I Hate to Get Up in the Morning"		Code POP 1520
	November		"Send for That Girl"	"The Fool"		Code POP 1559 / posthumous

=== as The Pirates ===
Singles

Year	Month	Label	A-side	B-side	Notes
1964	January	His Master's Voice	"My Babe"	"Castin' My Spell"	Code POP 1250
1966	July	Polydor	"Shades of Blue"	"Can't Understand"	Code 56712
1977	September	Warner Records	"Sweet Love on My Mind" (Live)	"You Don't Own Me" / "Don't München It"	Code K 17002

=== Unreleased album ===
After the band's chart successes in 1963, a number of tracks were recorded in early 1964. Not much is known about how far a Johnny Kidd album progressed. Their then-current single release "Always and Ever" failed to get into the Top 40 and EMI, already handling a good number of successful acts, may have decided to progress it no further. "Shop Around" was the only track released at the time, on the B-side of the "Jealous Girl" single (His Master's Voice POP 1309) in June 1964. Others had to wait another twenty years before being released in mono and/or stereo on various compilation albums on the See for Miles label.
