= Hungry For Love =

Hungry for Love may refer to:

- "Hungry for Love" (Johnny Kidd & The Pirates song), 1963
- "Hungry For Love", a 1988 single from Bad Boys Blue
- "Hungry For Love", a song by Billy Ocean from his self-titled album
- "Hungry for Love", a song by The Weather Girls from Success
- Hungry For Love, an alternate title for the 1960 Italian film Adua and Friends

== See also ==
- "Hungry for Your Love", a 1986 single by Hanson & Davis
- Hunger for Love (Portuguese: Fome de Amor), a 1968 Brazilian film
