= Never Get Over You =

Never Get Over You may refer to:

- "Never Get Over You", a 2002 song by George Harrison from Brainwashed
- "Never Get Over You", a 2003 song by Atomic Kitten from Ladies Night

== See also ==
- "I'll Never Get Over You"
