= Back Country Suite =

Studio album by Mose Allison
- Released: 1957
- Recorded: March 7, 1957
- Studios: Van Gelder Studio, Hackensack, New Jersey
- Genres: Blues, jazz
- Length: 38:32
- Labels: Prestige; PRLP 7091
- Producer: Bob Weinstock

Mose Allison chronology
Back Country Suite (1957)	Local Color (1957)

Back Country Suite is the debut album by blues/jazz pianist and vocalist Mose Allison which was recorded in 1957 and later released on the Prestige label. The album features the first recording of Allison's "Young Man Blues" (titled simply "Blues") which was later covered by The Who on their album Live at Leeds.

== Reception ==
Professional ratings
Review scores
Source	Rating
Allmusic	4/5 stars
The Penguin Guide to Jazz	3.5/4 stars

Scott Yanow, in his review for Allmusic, says "Mose Allison's very first recording finds the 29-year-old pianist taking just two vocals but those are actually the most memorable selections... The centerpiece of this trio outing... is Allison's ten-part "Back Country Suite," a series of short concise folk melodies that puts the focus on his somewhat unusual piano style which, although boppish, also looked back at the country blues tradition. Very interesting music". The Penguin Guide to Jazz wrote that "The deft miniatures are winsome and rocking by turns, and LaFargue and Isola read the leader's moves beautifully."

== Track listing ==
All compositions by Mose Allison except where noted.

1. "Back Country Suite: New Ground" – 2:05
2. "Back Country Suite: Train" – 1:50
3. "Back Country Suite: Warm Night" – 1:47
4. "Back Country Suite: Blues" – 1:28
5. "Back Country Suite: Saturday" – 1:24
6. "Back Country Suite: Scamper" – 2:15
7. "Back Country Suite: January" – 1:38
8. "Back Country Suite: Promised Land" – 2:03
9. "Back Country Suite: Spring Song" – 1:23
10. "Back Country Suite: Highway 49" – 1:39
11. "Blueberry Hill" (Al Lewis, Vincent Rose, Larry Stock) – 3:00
12. "You Won't Let Me Go" (Buddy Johnson) – 3:46
13. "I Thought About You" (Jimmy Van Heusen, Johnny Mercer) – 3:53
14. "One Room Country Shack" (Mercy Dee Walton) – 3:05
15. "In Salah" – 3:45

== Personnel ==
- Mose Allison – piano, vocals
- Taylor LaFargue – bass
- Frank Isola – drums
