= Hungry for Love =

Hungry for Love may refer to:

- Hungry for Love (Bad Boys Blue song), 1989
- Hungry for Love (Johnny Kidd & The Pirates song), 1963
- Hungry for Love, a song by Lynsey de Paul, from the album Love Bomb
