= Hanson & Davis =

- Origin: New York City, New York, U.S.
- Genres: Electro; freestyle; dance-pop; house
- Years active: 1985–1988
- Labels: Fresh
- Past members: Aaron Hanson; Edward J. Davis

Hanson & Davis was an East Coast-based freestyle/dance-pop duo comprising session singers Aaron Hanson and Edward J. Davis. Although the group was not commercially successful as many similar freestyle musicians of the time (e.g. Lisa Lisa & Cult Jam or Miami Sound Machine), the group enjoyed popularity throughout clubs and urban radio stations.

Their début single was a freestyle and Chicago house-oriented song "Tonight (Love Will Make It Right)", which was edited by a house music producer Timmy Regisford. An initial success came after they released their next single "I'll Take You On / Hungry for Your Love / Hold On to Yesterday" the next year. The songs, known for fusing electro, freestyle and early house sounds, were written by Kurtis Mantronik and remixed by Larry Levan.

The duo disbanded shortly after their moderate club success with singles "Can't Stop" and "Come Together" in 1988.

== Discography ==
=== Albums ===
Year	Title	Label	Chart positions	
Year	Title	Label	Billboard 200	Billboard R&B
1987	Can't Stop	Fresh	—	—

=== Singles ===
Year	Title	Chart positions				
Year	Title	U.S. Hot 100	U.S. Club Play	U.S. Club Sales	U.S. R&B	UK
1986	"I'll Take You On / Hungry for Your Love / Hold On to Yesterday"	—	16	—	—	—
1987	"Come Together"	—	38	—	—	—
1988	"Can't Stop"	—	—	49	—	—

=== Other singles ===
- 1985: "Tonight (Love Will Make It Right)" (Fresh, FRE 001)
- 1996: "Free Love" (Vicious Muzik, 1294-1)
