= Naked Eye (The Who song) =

Song by the Who

from the album Odds & Sods
- Released: 4 October 1974
- Recorded: 1970–71
- Genre: Rock
- Length: 5:10
- Label: MCA
- Songwriter: Pete Townshend

"Naked Eye" is a song by the English rock band the Who, written by Pete Townshend. The song was performed live beginning in 1969 and a studio version was released on their compilation album Odds & Sods (1974).

== Background ==
The roots of "Naked Eye" lay in a descending riff in the key of "F" played during the Who's end-of-show improvisations during their North American Tour in mid-1969. The Who closed their performance at Woodstock with one of these "Naked Eye" improvisations, culminating in Townshend smashing his Gibson SG and flinging it into the crowd.

After Townshend developed "Naked Eye" into a full song, a studio version was originally set to be released on a 1970 EP entitled 6 Ft. Wide Garage, 7 Ft. Wide Car, which was also to include "Water", "I Don't Even Know Myself", "Now I'm a Farmer", and "Postcard", but this record never materialized. "Naked Eye" was eventually completed in the spring of 1971 during the sessions for Who's Next, which included several numbers originally intended for the ultimately unreleased rock opera Lifehouse.

Author Mike Segretto wrote that "Naked Eye" is about "the self-delusions that guide us through our relationships" and is a plead for open communication. He also noted that Roger Daltrey sang the song's emotionally sensitive verses, while Townshend sang the angry one, a reversal of their usual roles.

While "Naked Eye" never saw release on a studio album, Townshend said it was "one of our best stage numbers". The song's riff appeared as part of the long "My Generation" medley on Live at Leeds, and the full song appeared on the album and film of their performance at the Isle of Wight Festival in 1970.

== Reception ==
In The Who on Record: A Critical History, 1963–1998, John Atkins wrote that "Naked Eye" is "dynamic and philosophical" and was a memorable part of the Who's live repertoire, but the studio version failed to capture its energy. He considered the 1971 performance at the Young Vic Theatre, available as a bonus track on CD reissues of Who's Next, to be the definitive version.
