= Alan Caddy =

British musician (1940–2000)

- Born: 2 February 1940; Chelsea, London, England
- Died: 16 August 2000 (aged 60) London, England
- Genres: Rock and roll, beat
- Occupation: Guitarist
- Instrument: Guitar
- Years active: Late 1950's–2000
- Labels: His Master's Voice, Decca, Columbia, EMI (UK), London (US/Canada)
- Formerly of: Johnny Kidd & the Pirates, The Tornados

Alan Caddy (2 February 1940 – 16 August 2000) was an English rock guitarist, arranger, record producer and session musician. He was an original member of Johnny Kidd and the Pirates and the Tornados.

== Early life and education ==
Caddy was born in Chelsea; his father was a drummer in dance bands and owned a jazz club. He was educated at Emanuel School, where he was head chorister and sang as a boy soprano at Westminster Abbey. He studied violin at the Royal Academy of Music and became leader of the school orchestra before switching to guitar.

== Career ==
He initially worked as an estate agent while playing guitar semi-professionally in the Battersea area, and joined a skiffle group called the Five Nutters, who played regularly at a club in Willesden. They became Bats Heath and the Vampires and in 1958, after being joined by the vocalist Johnny Kidd, went professional under the name Johnny Kidd and the Pirates. They appeared onstage in pirate costumes, released a number of beat records, and appeared on an ITV programme called Disc Break. Caddy played lead guitar, but not on "Shakin' All Over", which reached number one in the UK Singles Chart.

After the band's popularity sank, in 1961 most of the members including Caddy took their costumes and went on tour to Italy as Colin Hicks & The Cabin Boys, led by Tommy Steele's brother, Colin Hicks. The tour was not a success; Caddy left after six weeks and with drummer Clem Cattini was hired by Joe Meek to form the Tornados, originally a backing band for Billy Fury. Their 1962 instrumental "Telstar" sold a million copies and was the first British record to reach number 1 in both the UK and the US. Caddy arranged "Telstar" and subsequent songs for the band, and was credited as composer on four tracks of their 1964 album Away From It All.

After Away From It All, he left the group and founded Sound Venture Productions; also in 1964, he released a solo single titled "Tornado". He was subsequently a musical director and arranger for Polydor Records and for the singer Steve Rowland; after Rowland became a producer for Fontana Records, he hired Caddy to do arrangements. In the 1970s he was the arranger for Avenue Records, a budget label that issued albums of cover versions of hit singles, and released LPs with the Alan Caddy Orchestra. He also worked as a session musician.

Caddy made his last public appearance at the Joe Meek Reunion Concert at Lewisham in 1991, with the rest of the original Tornados.

== Personal life and death ==
Caddy and his wife had a daughter. He died on 16 August 2000, at the age of 60.
