= Hungry for Your Love =

"I'll Take You On" / "Hungry for Your Love" / "Hold On to Yesterday"

Single by Hanson & Davis
- Released: 1986
- Recorded: INS, 1986
- Length: 7:18 – "I'll Take You On" (Club); 7:57 – "Hungry for Your Love" (Club); 5:54 – "Hold On to Yesterday"
- Label: Fresh
- Songwriter(s): Aaron Hanson; Edward J. Davis; Kurtis Mantronik (co-writer "Hungry for Your Love")
- Producer(s): Aaron Hanson; Edward J. Davis

Hanson & Davis singles chronology
"Tonight (Love Will Make It Right)" (1985)	"I'll Take You On" / "Hungry for Your Love" / "Hold On to Yesterday" (1986)	"Come Together" (1987)

"I'll Take You On" / "Hungry for Your Love" / "Hold On to Yesterday" is a 1986 single by American freestyle duo Hanson & Davis, released by New York City-based electro/dance label Fresh Records.

== Composition ==
All songs were written and produced by Aaron Hanson and Edward J. Davis. Kurtis Mantronik of Mantronix co-wrote "Hungry for Your Love".

Larry Levan, a house music pioneer, remixed "I'll Take You On". Brian Chin of Billboard magazine called the song "[a] teen-crowd pleaser; with Lisa Lisa beat" whereas comparing the style of "Hungry for Your Love" to Shannon.

"Hungry for Your Love" has a moderate tempo of 109 beats per minute.

== Track listing ==
12-inch single

A-side
No.	Title	Length
1.	"I'll Take You On" (Club version)	7:18
2.	"I'll Take You On" (Dub version)	5:54

B-side
No.	Title	Length
1.	"Hungry for Your Love" (Club version)	7:57
2.	"Hungry for Your Love" (Dub version)	4:40
3.	"Hold On to Yesterday"	5:54

== Personnel ==
- Herb Powers, Jr. – mastering
- Warren Tang – photography
- Hanson & Davis – songwriter(s), producer(s)

=== Performers ===
- Hanson & Davis – mixing ("Hungry for Your Love", "Hold On to Yesterday")
- Larry Levan – mixing ("I'll Take You On")
- Brodie Williams – electric guitar ("I'll Take You On")
- Mark Brown – guitar
- Jim Hartog – saxophone
- John Hess – bass guitar

== Chart positions ==
Chart (1986)	Peak position
U.S. Billboard Hot Dance Club Play	16
