= Johnny Kidd (singer) =

British singer, songwriter (1935–1966)

- Born: Frederick Albert Heath; 23 December 1935; Willesden, North London, England
- Died: 8 October 1966 (aged 30) Radcliffe, Bury, Lancashire, England
- Genres: Rock and roll, beat
- Occupation: Singer-songwriter
- Years active: 1956–1966
- Formerly of: Johnny Kidd & the Pirates

Frederick Albert Heath (23 December 1935 – 8 October 1966), known professionally as Johnny Kidd, was an English singer-songwriter, best remembered as the lead vocalist for the rock and roll band Johnny Kidd & the Pirates. He was one of the few pre-Beatles British rockers to achieve worldwide fame, mainly for his 1960 hit, "Shakin' All Over".

== Biography ==
Frederick Albert "Freddie" Heath was born in 1935 in Willesden, North London, England. He began playing guitar in a skiffle group in about 1956. The group, known as "The Frantic Four" and later as "The Nutters", covered primarily skiffle, pop and rockabilly. Simultaneously, Heath was a prolific song writer, penning most of 30 songs in over three months. Heath's 31st song would prove to be the group's breakthrough.

In 1959, Heath and his band were given a recording test for their first single, a rocker titled "Please Don't Touch". Heath was offered a contract with His Master's Voice while the rest of the band were employed as session musicians and paid accordingly. The label informed the band that their name "Freddie Heath and the Nutters" would be changed to "Johnny Kidd & the Pirates". "Please Don't Touch" peaked at No. 25 in the UK Singles Chart. Although it is not as well known as Kidd's later song "Shakin' All Over", it is a stand-out among other British rock songs of the time. Unlike Billy Fury or Marty Wilde, Kidd did not sing in an imitation voice of Elvis Presley, or one of his American contemporaries. The song also bore a smooth harmony and contained no clear references to the rockabilly style.

Kidd's most famous song as a composer was "Shakin' All Over", which was a No. 1 UK hit in 1960. Kidd's own version did not chart outside of Europe, but two cover versions did: The Guess Who topped the Canadian charts (and hit No. 22 US) with their 1965 version, and in Australia, Normie Rowe topped the charts with it later the same year. In 1970, The Who popularised the song once again on their Live at Leeds album.

The song was originally to be a B-side to a cover of Ricky Nelson's "Yes Sir, That's My Baby". Kidd was told that a self-penned song could be used and together with The Pirates the new number was written in the basement of the Freight Train coffee bar the day prior to recording. In addition to Kidd (vocals), Alan Caddy (guitar), Clem Cattini (drums) and Brian Gregg (bass), session guitarist Joe Moretti was called in by Kidd and Caddy to play lead guitar. It was Moretti who created the song's signature sound by sliding Brian Gregg's cigarette lighter up and down the fret-board of his guitar.

"Shakin' All Over" marked a peak which Kidd would not reach again. Future records did not fare as well in the charts. In 1961, Cattini, Caddy and Gregg left the band and would later play for Joe Meek in The Tornados. Kidd then assembled a new band of Pirates: Johnny Spence was added to bass, Frank Farley to drums and later Mick Green would become guitarist. The band then toured extensively throughout England and into Europe. Adopting a more beat-influenced style, the group reached No. 4 in the UK Singles Chart with "I'll Never Get Over You", and split chart action with The Searchers with "Hungry for Love" (No. 20) in 1963; both songs were penned by Gordon Mills. In time, a stage act had also emerged with Kidd and the Pirates dressed as actual pirates. Kidd donned an eye-patch and carried a cutlass which he would swing around on stage, and high kick in time with the music of the band. By 1964, the British Invasion was taking shape and Kidd was left in the shadows. Kidd had another new group by this stage, "The New Pirates", but recordings had now become covers of R&B and pop songs. By 1966, it seemed that Kidd was on the verge of a re-emergence, but this was soon to be cut short.

=== Death ===
At approximately 2 am on 8 October 1966, Kidd died in a car crash on the A58 at Radcliffe in Lancashire. The Ford Cortina in which he was a passenger had a head-on collision with a Mini. The passenger in the Mini also died. The Pirates' bassist, Nick Simper, was also in the car with Kidd, and sustained cuts and a broken arm.

Kidd was cremated at Golders Green Crematorium, London.

== Legacy ==
Kidd was both musically and visually influential in rock music. Before the likes of Paul Revere and the Raiders and Alice Cooper, Kidd and the Pirates and his contemporary Screaming Lord Sutch pioneered the dress-up band aesthetic. Meanwhile, his hit singles with the Pirates proved highly influential in the birth of the British rock scene.
