= Afton Down =

Chalk down on the Isle of Wight, England

Coordinates: 50.669°N 1.505°W

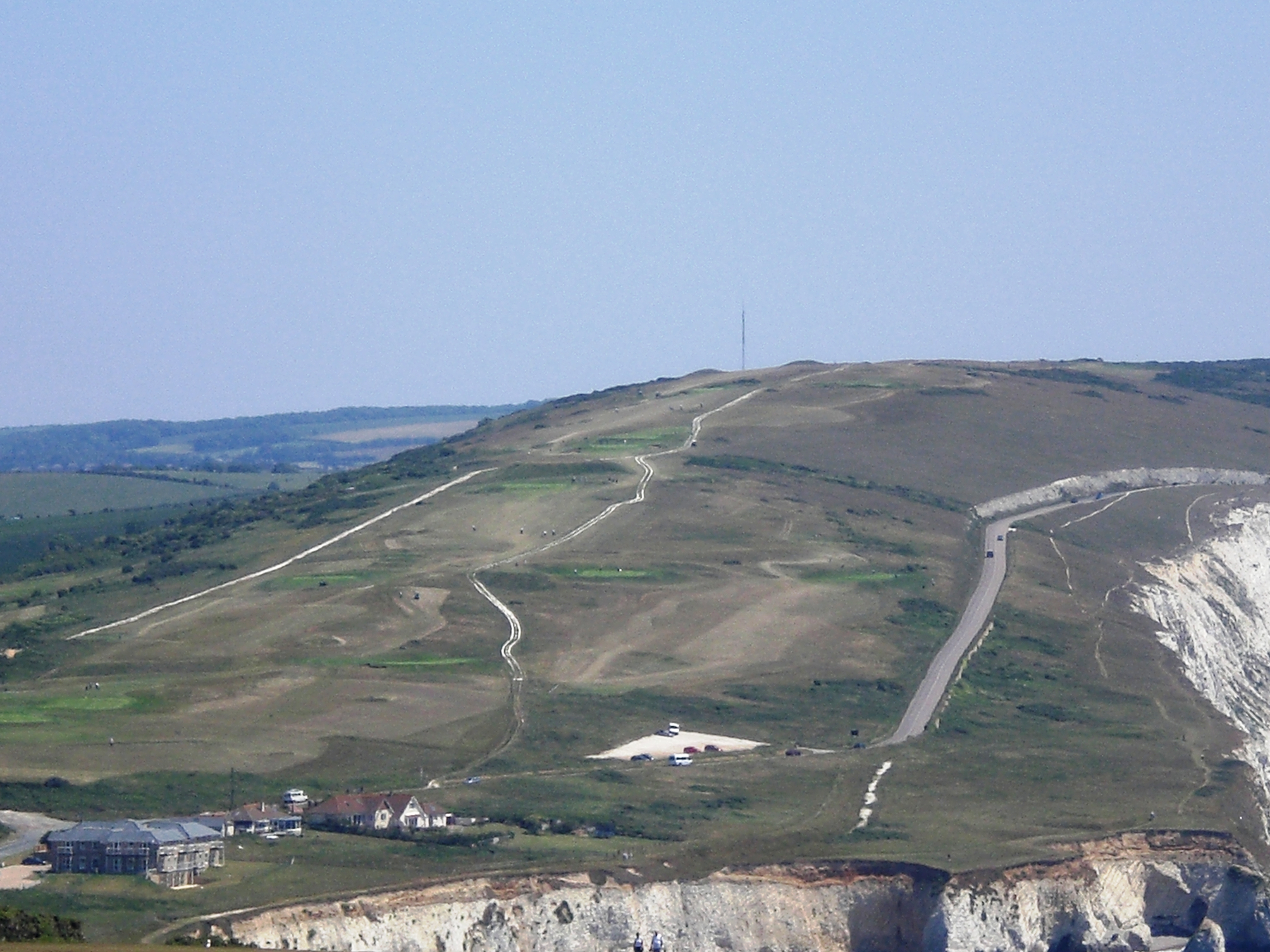
- Afton Down viewed from Tennyson Down.

Geography
- Location: Isle of Wight, England
- Topo map: OS Landranger 196

Afton Down is a chalk down near the village of Freshwater on the Isle of Wight. Afton Down faces Compton Bay directly to the west, while Freshwater is approximately one mile north.

It was the site of the Isle of Wight Festival 1970, where the Guinness Book of Records estimates 600,000 to 700,000, and possibly 800,000 people, flocked to see the musical talents of Emerson, Lake & Palmer, Free, The Who, The Doors, Ten Years After, Taste, and Jimi Hendrix.

In keeping with the native flora of Compton Bay, a variety of hardy plants grow on the down. Large European gorse bushes grow on the cliff, with the shelter they provide allowing other plants such as wild cabbage and bird's foot trefoil to grow. The Isle of Wight's county flower, the pyramidal orchid (Anacamptis pyramidalis), also grows here, along with ribwort plantain (Plantago lanceolata), the main food plant for the rare Glanville fritillary.

A car park is situated near the highest point of the Military Road's route over the down, and allows for walkers to travel along a footpath downhill towards Freshwater Bay.

There is an obelisk on Afton Down near the cliff edge. It is inscribed with a memorial to 15 year-old Edward Lewis Miller of Goudhurst in Kent who died after falling from the cliff in 1846. This obelisk was Grade II listed in 1994.

E.L.M. Aged 15
He cometh forth like a flower and is cut down.
He fleeth also as a shadow and continueth not.
Erected in remembrance of a most dear and only child who was suddenly removed into eternity by a fall from the adjacent cliff on the rocks below.
28th August 1846.

Each side of the obelisk is inscribed with biblical passages in relation to the afterlife.

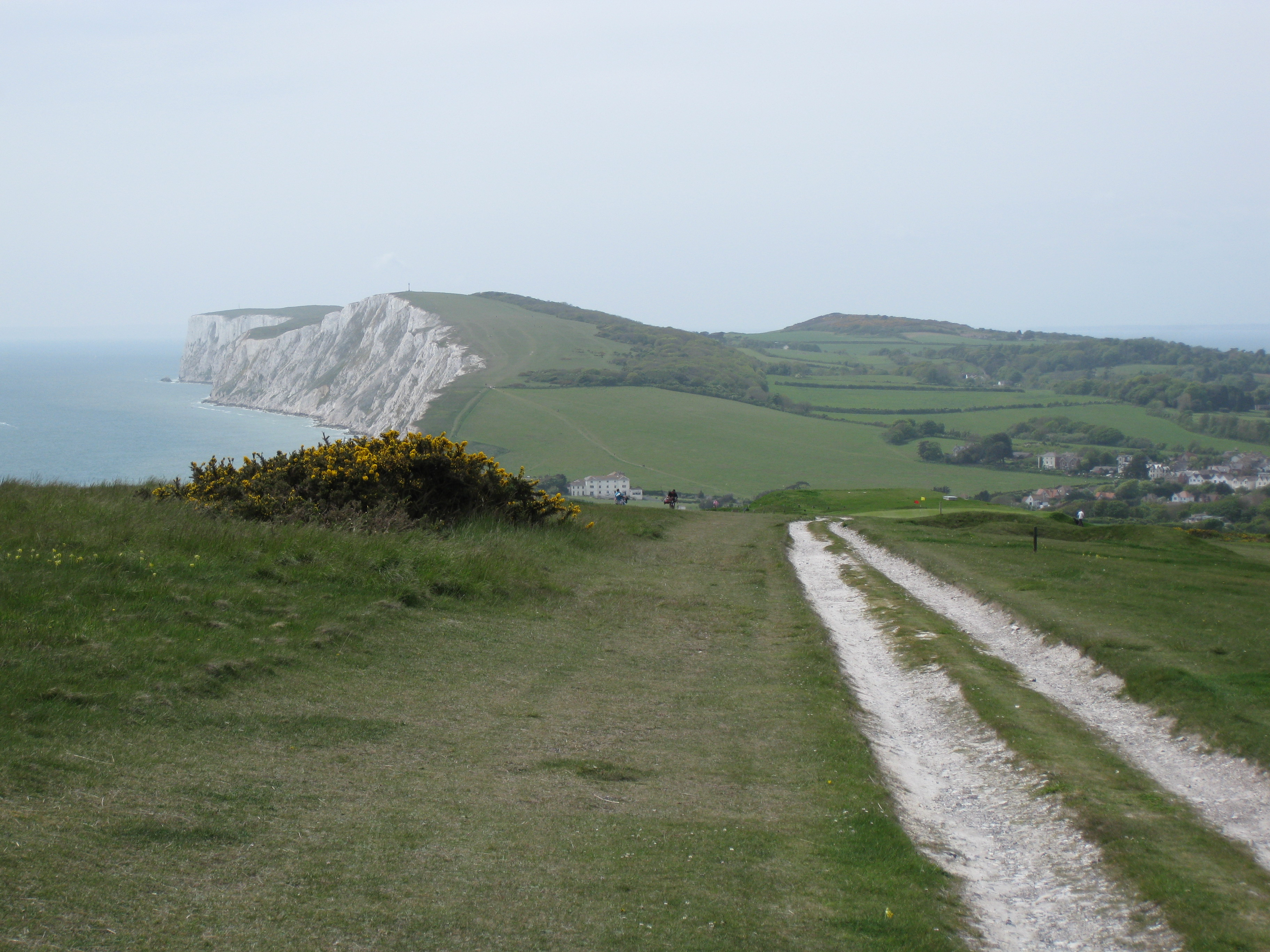
View of Afton Down looking towards Freshwater Bay

In the 17th century it was common for local people to descend the cliffs to collect seabirds and pick samphire. The birds were killed and plucked and their feathers sold, and the carcasses were sold to local fisherman to bait crab pots. The samphire was pickled and sent to London in barrels.

Freshwater Bay Golf Course is located on Afton Down.

On the downs are a group of 24 barrows comprising, a long barrow 34.7 m long, 0.9 m high and oriented east–west, 17 bowl barrows, 4 bell barrows and 2 disc barrows (One of which is where the golf course is located). One barrow has been the subject of archaeological interest, and is thought to be from the Bronze Age. The site was excavated in 1817 revealing nothing of significance in the long barrow, but several cremations in the round barrows.
