= Johnny Carroll =

American singer-songwriter

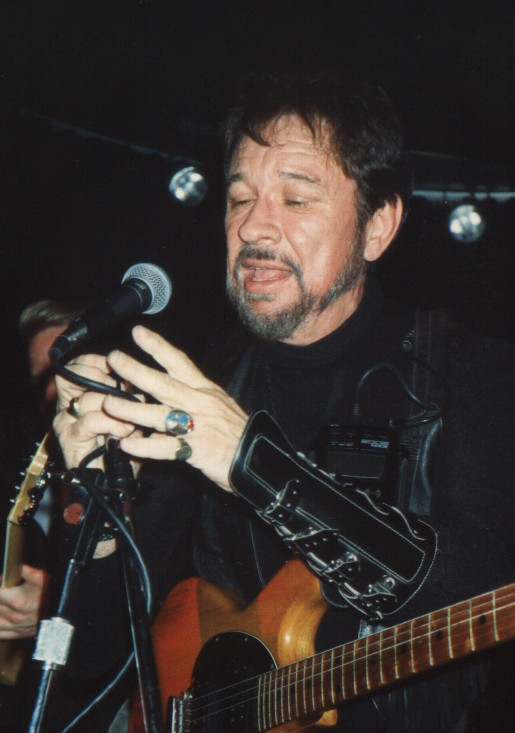

Background information
- Born: John Lewis Carrell; October 23, 1937; Cleburne, Texas
- Origin: Godley, Texas
- Died: January 13, 1995 (aged 57) Dallas, Texas
- Genres: Rockabilly; Rock and roll
- Occupations: Singer, guitarist
- Years active: 1956 - 1985
- Labels: Decca Records, Sun Records, Warner Bros. Records

Johnny Carroll (born John Lewis Carrell; October 23, 1937 – January 13, 1995) was an American rockabilly musician.

== Biography ==
Born John Lewis Carrell in Cleburne, Texas, Carrell's last name was printed incorrectly as Carroll in his first recording with Decca Records and he thereafter used that spelling of his name professionally. Carroll began recording for Decca in the middle of the 1950s. He released several singles, none of which saw significant success, although they are now critically acclaimed. His records were eclipsed by the success of other rockabilly and early rock & roll musicians such as Elvis Presley, Jerry Lee Lewis, and Johnny Cash.

His career ended toward the end of the 1950s, but he made a comeback in 1974 with a Gene Vincent tribute song. He continued to record well into the 1980s. For many years he was connected with the Cellar Club in Fort Worth, Texas and other Cellar Clubs around the state.

He died of liver failure on January 13, 1995, and is buried in his hometown of Godley, Texas.

In 1996 a 33-track reissue of his early recordings was released as Rock Baby Rock It: 1955-1960.

== Discography ==
Early recordings

Year	Title	Record label
1956	"Rock 'n' Roll Ruby" / "Trying to Get to You"	Decca Records
1956	"Wild Wild Women" / "Corrine, Corrina"	Decca Records
1956	"Hot Rock" / "Crazy Crazy Lovin'"	Decca Records
1957	"That’s the Way I Love" / "I'll Wait"	Phillips International
1959	"The Swing" / "Bandstand Doll"	Warner Bros. Records
1959	"Sugar" / "Lost Lost Without You"	Warner Bros. Records
1960	"Run Come See" / "Trudy"	WA Records
1962	"Run Come See" / "The Sally Ann"	Duchess Records
1956	EP: Hot Rock; Corrine, Corrine; Crazy Crazy Lovin’; Wild Wild Women	Decca Records
	Crazy Little Mama; Cut Out; Hearts of Stone; Love Is a Merry-Go-Round; Sexy Ways; Stingy Thing; Why Cry; Be-Bop-A-Lula Is Back on the Scene; Cat with the Skin; Lonesome Boy; Sugar Lips	not released

Later recordings

- "Gene Vincent Rock" (or "The Black Leather Rebel") – 1974
- "Rock, Baby, Rock It" – Sun Records, 1975
- Texabilly – Rollin' Rock, 1977
- First Time All Over Again (with Judy Lindsey) – Gypsy Records, 1980
- "The Telephone Man" (with Judy Lindsey) – Merit Records, 1982
- "Rattle My Bones" – Seville Records, 1983
- Still Satin Sheets (with Judy Lindsey) – Gypsy Records, 1983
- Screamin' Demon Heatwave (feat. Judy Lindsey) – Seville Records, 1983
- Crazy Hot Rock – Charly Records, 1985
- Shades of Vincent (with Judy Lindsey) – Charly Records, 1986
