= University of Leeds Refectory =

Historic music venue in Leeds, England

Coordinates: 53.8069°N 1.5564°W

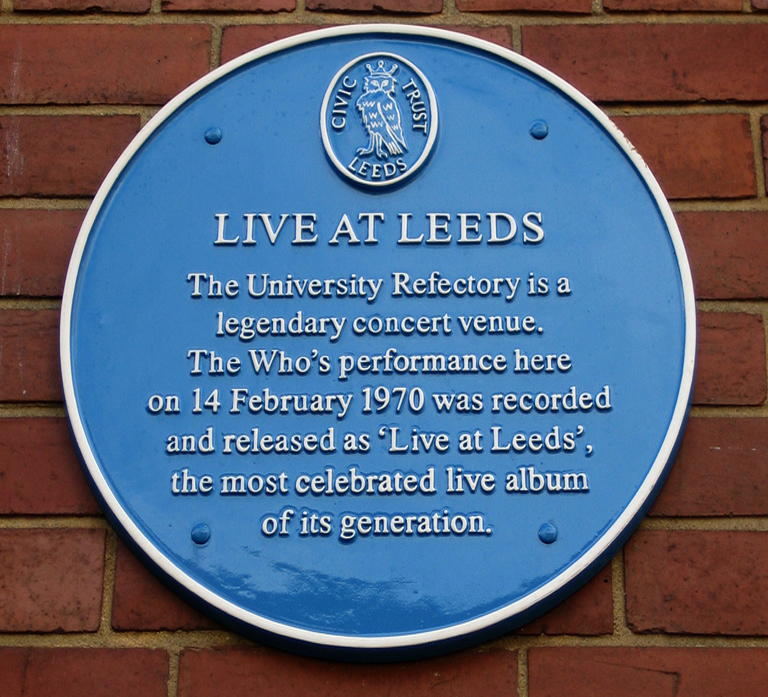
A blue plaque at Leeds University Refectory commemorates the recording of The Who's Live at Leeds.

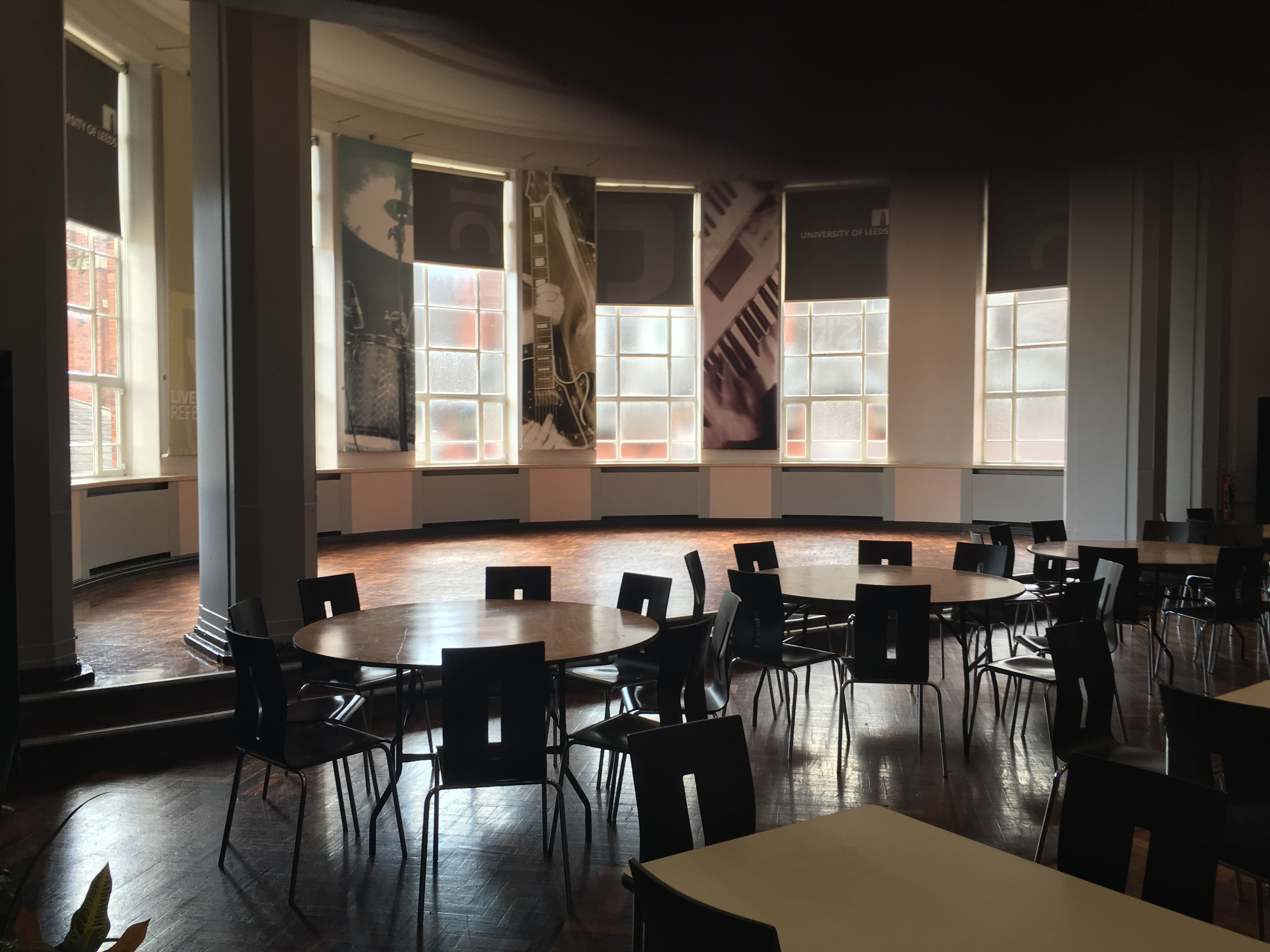
Leeds University refectory stage in 2019

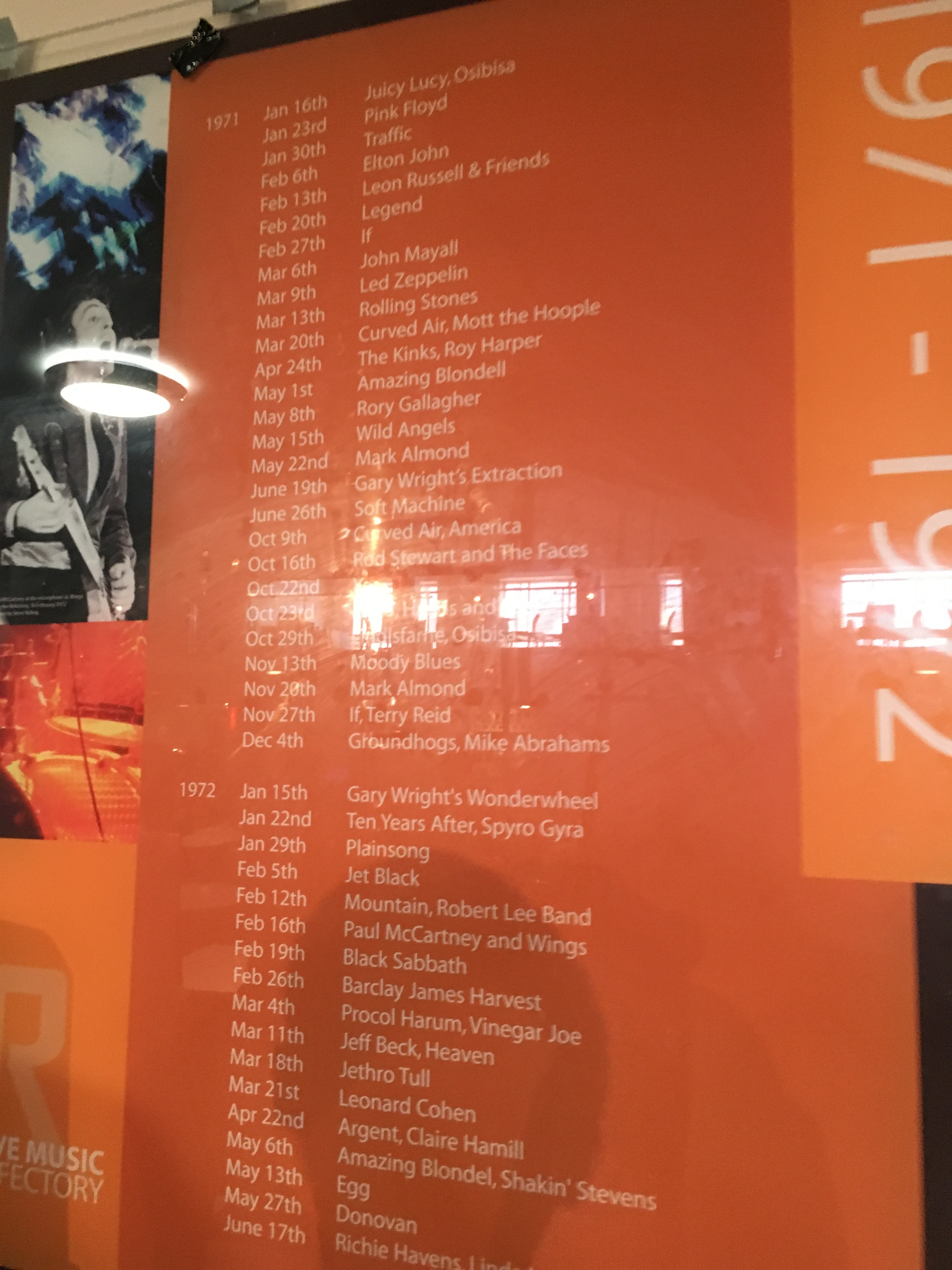
List of Leeds University refectory 1971 1972 performers

The University of Leeds Refectory is a canteen and 2,100-capacity music venue located on the University of Leeds main campus in Leeds, West Yorkshire, England.

Since the mid-20th century, the building had operated as the university's main canteen. Notable past performers include The Who (who recorded the landmark live album Live at Leeds there), Jimi Hendrix, Led Zeppelin, Pink Floyd, Iron Maiden, and Thin Lizzy. Other examples taken from the list of performances in 1971 and 1972 are Traffic (1971), Elton John (1971), Leon Russell (1971), The Rolling Stones (1971), The Kinks (1971), Rory Gallagher (1971), Rod Stewart (1971), The Moody Blues (1971), Ten Years After (1972), Mountain (1972), Paul McCartney and Wings (1972), Black Sabbath (1972), Procol Harum (1972), Jeff Beck (1972), Jethro Tull (1972), Queen, Leonard Cohen (1972) and Donovan (1972).

On 16 February 1991, a performance by Leeds' home-town, post-punk, gothic rock, dark wave band The Sisters of Mercy was recorded for the double vinyl LP The Return to Arkham.

Live at Leeds, recorded there by The Who on 14 February 1970, has been cited as the best live rock recording of all time by The Daily Telegraph, The Independent, the BBC, Q magazine, and Rolling Stone. A commemorative blue plaque has been placed at the campus venue at which it was recorded, the university refectory. A Rolling Stone readers' poll in 2012 ranked it the best live album of all time. On 17 June 2006, over 36 years after the original concert, The Who again performed at the University Refectory. The gig was organized by Andy Kershaw. Kershaw stated the gig was "among the most magnificent I have ever seen".
