= Heaven and Hell (The Who song) =

Single by the Who
- A-side: "Summertime Blues"
- Released: July 11, 1970
- Recorded: April 13, 1970
- Studio: IBC, London
- Genre: Hard rock
- Length: 3:31
- Label: Track (UK); Decca (US)
- Songwriter: John Entwistle
- Producer: The Who

"Heaven and Hell" is a song by the English rock band the Who written by group bassist John Entwistle. The studio version (originally recorded for an April 1970 BBC session), which appeared on the B-side of the live "Summertime Blues" single, is currently available on the Thirty Years of Maximum R&B boxed set, Who's Missing, and Odds & Sods, although several live versions of the song exist on official releases. The song was one of many Entwistle B-side singles and one of his live staples.

== Lyrical meaning ==
The song's lyrics talk of the places known as Heaven and Hell. The song describes Heaven as "a place where you go if you've done nothing wrong," and Hell as "a place where you go if you've been a bad boy."

John Entwistle stated his stance on Heaven and Hell in an interview:

The last lyric ballot of the song: 'Why can't we have eternal life, And never die, Never die?'

"I've always been obsessed with the idea of Heaven and Hell. Not obsessed that it's true, but just obsessed that it's sort of legend, there's such a person as the devil.

== Live history ==
"Heaven and Hell" first appeared during the band's summer 1968 US tour in a version that could last 10-15 minutes in length and was used (in a tighter 5-minute performance) to start live shows during the Who's Tommy tours in 1969–70, including the shows recorded for Live at Leeds, Live at Hull, At Kilburn 1977 + Live at the Coliseum, and Live at the Isle of Wight Festival 1970, although the version at Leeds was not released until the album's remastering. The band opened their early morning set at Woodstock with the song.

After 1970, the song was replaced by another Entwistle composition, "My Wife", in the act. It was briefly brought back in October 1975 during the beginning of the UK leg of The Who by Numbers Tour, but after that was never performed live again by the Who, although Entwistle continued to perform it at his solo shows regularly.

== Entwistle solo versions ==
The song was re-recorded by Entwistle for his solo album, Smash Your Head Against the Wall, a longer version featuring a horn section. This version was included on the Entwistle compilation album So Who's the Bass Player? The Ox Anthology.
