= Kinetic Playground =

Former nightclub in Chicago, Illinois

Coordinates: 41.9693°N 87.6677°W

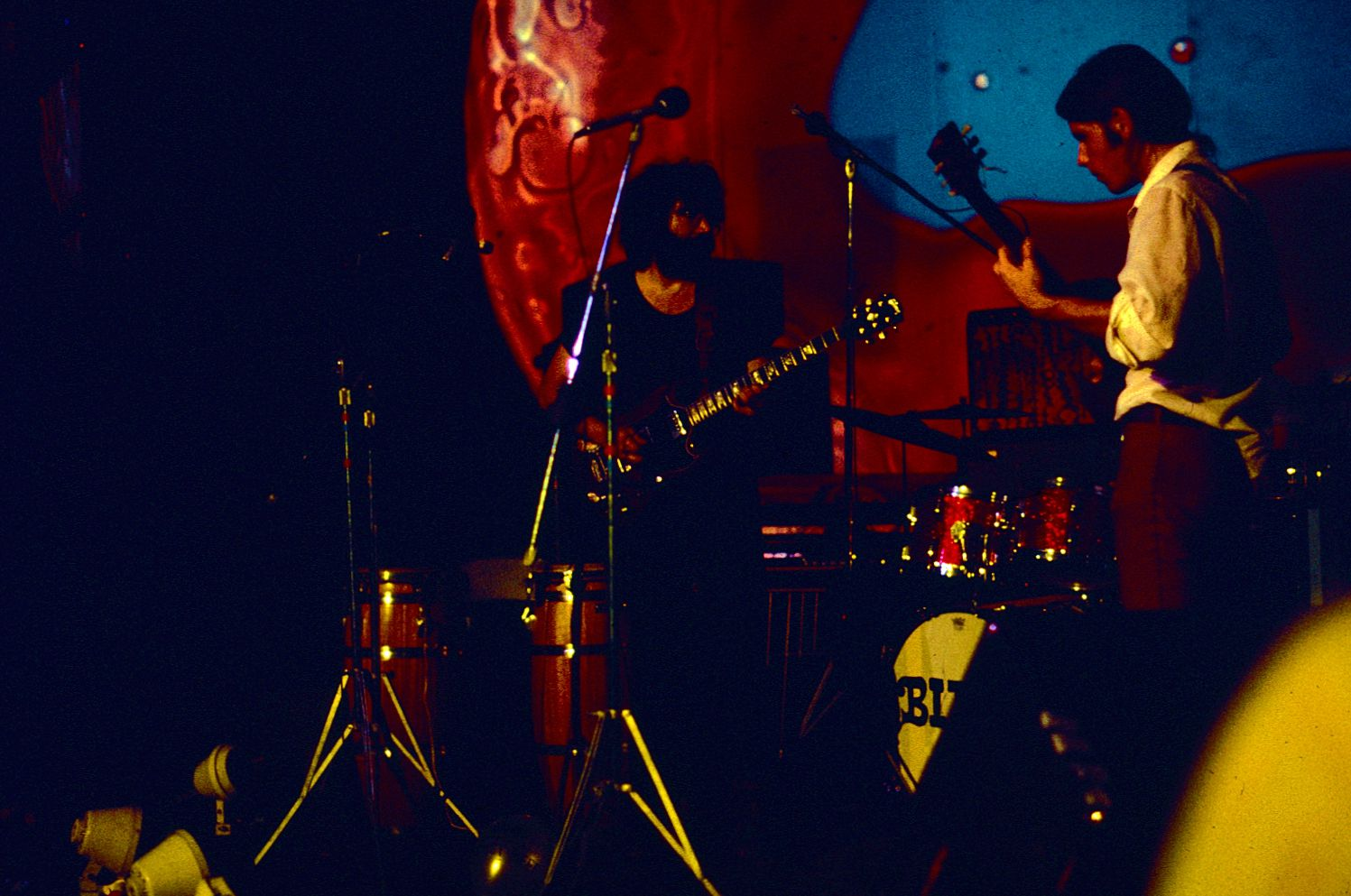
The Grateful Dead performing at the Kinetic Playground in July 1969

The Kinetic Playground was a short-lived nightclub located in the Uptown neighborhood of Chicago, Illinois.

The club was opened on April 3, 1968, as the Electric Theater by Aaron Russo and was located at 4812 N. Clark Street (NW corner of Clark and Lawrence). The building was constructed in 1928 and at one time included a dance hall, entertainment center, and ice and roller skating rinks, all known as Rainbo Gardens.

Russo was sued by the owners of the Electric Circus in New York City, and changed the club's name a few months after the Chicago club's opening, just prior to the performance of Nova Express and Little Boy Blues on August 9–11, 1968.

The club became a driving force in the music business, hosting famous rock bands and musicians such as Canned Heat, The Doors, The Jimi Hendrix Experience, Pink Floyd, Led Zeppelin, Tim Buckley, The Who, Keith Reid and Bowzer, The Byrds, Janis Joplin, Coven, The Mothers of Invention, The Grateful Dead, Joe Cocker, Spirit, Jeff Beck Group, Eric Burdon, The Small Faces, MC5, Jethro Tull, Deep Purple, Iron Butterfly, Buffy Saint Marie, Fleetwood Mac, Rotary Connection, Savoy Brown, Vanilla Fudge, Muddy Waters, Alice Cooper, and Jefferson Airplane.

The interior of the venue was featured in the film Medium Cool (1969). The movie was filmed on location during the 1968 Democratic Convention and many members of the Playground crew were hired as extras.

Iron Butterfly, Poco, and King Crimson had been booked for a three-night gig at the Kinetic Playground on November 7, 8, and 9, 1969, but a small fire took place in the venue between acts at the November 7 performance. The remaining dates for this line-up were cancelled. The Kinetic Playground later reopened, without the elaborate light show of its earlier incarnation, in late December 1972, but closed in June 1973 due to neighbors' complaints about the behavior of concertgoers as well as code compliance issues. In 1975 it planned to reopen as the Emerald Isle Discothèque, but apparently never opened its doors again.

The building was demolished for condominiums in 2003. There is no relationship between the 1968–69 Kinetic Playground and the venue by the same name, also known as the Roll Factory, that operated until 2011 at 1113 W. Lawrence in Chicago, not far from the original. Aaron Russo went on to become Bette Midler's manager.
