= I'll Never Get Over You =

Single by Johnny Kidd & the Pirates
- B-side: "Then I Got Everything"
- Released: 1963
- Genre: Rock
- Label: His Master's Voice
- Songwriter: Gordon Mills

"I'll Never Get Over You" is a song and single by British band, Johnny Kidd & the Pirates. Written by Gordon Mills, it was first released in the UK in 1963.

== Background and chart success ==
The single reached number 4 in the UK charts in 1963 and was in the charts for 15 weeks. It was Johnny Kidd & the Pirates' sixth UK chart success and the band's second highest placed single in the chart. The song was influenced by the Merseybeat sound, its intro recalling the outro of the Beatles' "Please Please Me".
