= Hungry for Love (Johnny Kidd & The Pirates song) =

Single by Johnny Kidd & the Pirates
- B-side: "Ecstasy"
- Released: 1963
- Genre: Rock
- Label: His Master's Voice
- Songwriter: Gordon Mills

"Hungry for Love" is a song and single by British band, Johnny Kidd & the Pirates. Written by Gordon Mills, it was first released in the UK in 1963.

== Background and chart success ==
It reached number 20 in the UK charts in 1963 and was in the charts for 10 weeks. It was their seventh UK chart success and their third highest placed single in the chart. The song was influenced by Merseybeat.
