= Clem Cattini =

British drummer (1937–2026)

Background information
- Born: Clemente Anselmo Agustino Cattini; 28 August 1937; Stoke Newington, London, England
- Died: 2 November 2026 (aged 89) London, England
- Genres: Rock and roll; instrumental rock
- Occupations: Drummer; session musician
- Instruments: Drums; percussion
- Years active: 1958–2026
- Formerly of: Johnny Kidd & the Pirates; The Tornados; Apollo 100

Clemente Anselmo Agustino Cattini (28 August 1937 – 2 November 2026) was an English rock and roll drummer of the late 1950s and 60s, who was a member of the Tornados before becoming well known for his work as a session musician. He was one of the most prolific drummers in British recording history, appearing on hundreds of recordings by artists as diverse as Cliff Richard and Lou Reed, including 42 UK number one singles.

== Life and career ==
Clemente Anselmo Agustino Cattini was born to Italian parents in Stoke Newington, London, on 28 August 1937. He worked in his father's restaurant in Elephant and Castle before deciding to pursue a career in music. He began as a drummer at The 2i's Coffee Bar, backing performers such as Terry Dene, before joining the touring band known as the Beat Boys, backing singers managed by Larry Parnes, including Marty Wilde and Billy Fury. He then joined Johnny Kidd & the Pirates, playing on their hit "Shakin' All Over", and became Joe Meek's in-house drummer, backing artists such as John Leyton and Don Charles, before helping found the Tornados in 1961, and playing on their international No. 1 hit "Telstar". Cattini was also in the Luvvers, who backed Lulu in the early days.

In 1965 he became a session musician.

Cattini played on at least 42 UK number 1 singles, including:

- "Telstar" – The Tornados
- "Tears" – Ken Dodd
- "Two Little Boys" – Rolf Harris
- "Grandad" – Clive Dunn
- "Ernie (The Fastest Milkman in the West)" – Benny Hill
- "Whispering Grass" – Windsor Davies and Don Estelle
- "Welcome Home" – Peters and Lee
- "Barbados" – Typically Tropical
- "No Charge" – J.J. Barrie
- "Save Your Love" – Renée and Renato
- "(Is This the Way to) Amarillo" – Tony Christie
- "Everlasting Love" - Love Affair

He also played in the orchestra for BBC TV's Top of the Pops, and toured with Cliff Richard, Roy Orbison, Lynda Carter, The Kids from "Fame" and many others. He was also considered for Led Zeppelin – he was initially on Jimmy Page's shortlist of drummers when forming the band before they settled on John Bonham. He had earlier played alongside John Paul Jones on Donovan's hit single "Hurdy Gurdy Man".

Cattini spoke about his offer to join Led Zeppelin: "I was very busy doing sessions. I had been on the road for nine years, and suddenly I was at home, getting into my own bed at night. Peter Grant (Led Zeppelin's manager-in-waiting) saw me at a session, phoned me and asked me to go to lunch to him to talk about a project. We never had that lunch. Not for any reason. I was just too busy. He called again, but again we didn't have that lunch. A year later, when Led Zeppelin's first album was in the charts I saw Peter again and asked him if that was the project he wanted to talk about. It was, but there's no point regretting anything. I can't look back and change things. It wasn't a conscious decision, just circumstances. But there again, was I the sort of person that could go all around the world in that scene? I don't know."

He played drums both on the records and on live performances for the Wombles band, that was based on the book and television show. On stage, Cattini dressed as the character Bungo.

In the 1980s, he reactivated the Tornados' name for tours and in 1989 played in the West End run of The Rocky Horror Show. He also recorded the drums for the track "No Tears to Cry" from Paul Weller's 2010 album Wake Up the Nation.

Interviewed by Pipeline Instrumental Review in 1998, Cattini stated:

I was slightly disappointed when I met Phil Collins. I went to see one of his shows, we were introduced and I mentioned that I played drums myself. He said "Oh, I know, you played on the Kinks' stuff and on "Shakin' All Over". You, Brian Bennett, people of that era, were the reason why I started playing". I thought that was very nice, but then he asked me what I was doing and I told him I was touring with The Tornados. His next question was what synthesizer I was using or if we were using backing tracks. I said no, it was just me and my drums live on stage. He explained to me what he was using and I thought why should such a great player be using sequencers? He doesn't need them, he can play it all himself.

Cattini was portrayed by James Corden in the 2009 film Telstar and appeared himself, playing John Leyton's chauffeur.

In 2016, he recorded a new version of the 1960s hit "Telstar" with the north London ska band the Skammers.

Cattini's memoirs, My Life, Through the Eye of a Tornado, was published in July 2019. He lived in North London.

He and his wife, Anna, hosted football player Nicklas Bendtner when Bendtner joined Arsenal academy as a 15 year old.

Cattini died after a fall at his home in London, on 2 November 2026, aged 89. He was survived by his wife Anna, and daughters Daniella, Giulia, and Victoria.

== Session work ==
Cattini played drums on records for many top acts in the 1960s and 1970s, including:

=== 1960s ===
- The Kinks
- Herman's Hermits
- Dusty Springfield
- The Merseys
- Bee Gees
- Lulu
- Marianne Faithfull
- Tom Jones
- P. J. Proby
- The Hollies
- Paul Ryan
- Barry Ryan
- Gene Pitney
- Donovan
- Love Affair
- Jeff Beck
- Engelbert Humperdinck
- Nirvana
- the Ivy League
- Edison Lighthouse
- The Yardbirds
- The Family Dogg
- Marc Bolan
- Clodagh Rodgers
- Keith West
- The Flower Pot Men
- Georgie Fame
- Roy Harper
- Ralph McTell
- Harmony Grass
- Joe Cocker
- Graham Gouldman
- Brian Auger
- The Walker Brothers
- The Birds

=== 1970s ===
- Marvin, Welch & Farrar
- Lou Reed
- Cliff Richard
- Justin Hayward
- Phil Everly
- Julie Covington
- Claire Hamill
- Alvin Stardust
- Bay City Rollers
- Kenny
- the Wombles
- Brotherhood of Man
- Carl Douglas
- Christie
- Tim Rose
- Demis Roussos
- The Goodies
- Stephanie de Sykes
- John Betjeman
- Malcolm and Alwyn
- John Schroeder
- Paul McCartney
- Hank Marvin
- Mike Batt
- Chris Spedding
- Bob Downes
- Dave Kelly
- Sweet Dreams
- Christopher Neil
- Evelyn Thomas
- Barbara Pennington
- Slapp Happy
- Mike Berry
- Grace Kennedy
- Beggars Opera
- Amazing Blondel
- Edwards Hand
