= Young Man Blues =

1957 song

Song by Mose Allison

from the album Back Country Suite
- Released: 1957
- Recorded: March 7, 1957
- Genre: Blues; jazz
- Length: 1:28
- Label: Prestige
- Songwriter: Mose Allison
- Producer: Bob Weinstock

"Young Man Blues" is a song by American jazz and blues pianist Mose Allison. Allison first recorded it in March 1957 for his debut studio album, Back Country Suite, in which it appears under the title "Back Country Suite: Blues". In Allison's two-CD compilation set of 2002, Allison Wonderland, Allison reveals that the tune's full title is: "Back Country Suite: Blues (a.k.a. 'Young Man's Blues')".

== The Who version ==
"Young Man Blues"

Song by the Who

from the album Live at Leeds
- Released: May 11, 1970
- Recorded: February 14, 1970
- Genre: Blues rock, hard rock
- Length: 4:46
- Label: Track; Decca; MCA
- Producers: Kit Lambert; the Who

The Who performed "Young Man Blues" regularly in concert between 1968 and 1970. The first appearance of the song by the group was a studio recording on the limited-edition sampler album The House That Track Built released on 1 September 1969. This version was not available again until 2013 when it was included on the super deluxe edition of the Tommy album. The most recognized version comes from the 1970 album Live at Leeds, where it was the opening track of the original release. Allison himself called this the "Command Performance" version of his song. It was released as a single in Canada and reached number 38. Another live performance, from a 1969 performance at the London Coliseum, features in the movie and soundtrack for The Kids Are Alright. A live performance from the 1970 Isle of Wight Festival was used in the documentary film Message to Love. The Who brought it back briefly in 1974, again in 1982 and finally in 2002. The song was included in Rock Band 2 as downloadable content.

== Other covers ==
It has also been covered live by You Am I, Joe Bonamassa, Foo Fighters, the Bright Light Social Hour and Motorpsycho.

The tune is also found on Chris Spedding's 2009 reissued album One Step Ahead of the Blues, where in the liner notes Spedding states he was trying make a version which was how he imagined Allison originally recorded it; having never heard it. Spedding's blues rock version differs considerably from either Allison's jazz-blues or the Who's rock versions.
