= Live at Leeds =

Live album by the Who
- Released: 11 May 1970
- Recorded: 14 February 1970
- Venue: University of Leeds Refectory (Leeds)
- Genre: Hard rock
- Length: 37:43 (original LP), 76:57 (25th anniversary CD), 118:24 (deluxe 2CD)
- Labels: Track (UK); Decca (US)
- Producers: Kit Lambert; The Who

The Who chronology
| Tommy (1969) | Live at Leeds (1970) | Who's Next (1971) |

Singles from Live at Leeds
- 1. "Summertime Blues" / "Heaven and Hell" Released: June 1970

Live at Leeds is the first live album by the English rock band the Who, recorded at the University of Leeds Refectory on 14 February 1970 and released on 11 May 1970, by Decca and MCA in the United States and by Track and Polydor in the United Kingdom. It is the band's only live album that was recorded with the classic line-up of lead vocalist Roger Daltrey, guitarist Pete Townshend, bassist John Entwistle and drummer Keith Moon.

The Who were looking for a way to follow up their 1969 album Tommy, and had recorded several shows on tours supporting that album, but disliked the sound. Consequently, they booked the show at Leeds University, along with one at Hull City Hall the following day, specifically to record a live album. Six songs were taken from the Leeds show, and the cover was pressed to look like a bootleg recording. The sound was significantly different from Tommy and featured hard rock arrangements that were typical of the band's live shows. Live at Leeds has been reissued on several occasions and in several formats. Since its release, it has been ranked by several music critics as one of, if not the greatest, live album and rock recording of all time.

== Background ==
By the end of the 1960s, particularly after releasing Tommy in May 1969, the Who had become cited by many as one of the best live rock acts in the world. According to biographer Chris Charlesworth, "a sixth sense seemed to take over", leading them to "a kind of rock nirvana that most bands can only dream about". The band were rehearsing and touring regularly, and Townshend had settled on using the Gibson SG Special as his main stage instrument; its lightweight and thin body allowed him to play faster than other guitars. He began using Hiwatt amplifiers that allowed him to get a variety of tones simply by adjusting the guitar's volume level. (Note: Moon normally sang a few backing vocals during this period of the Who's career, particularly on "I Can't Explain", though sound engineer Bob Pridden frequently muted his vocal microphone. This appears to have been done for the Leeds show, with Townshend making light of it before announcing "A Quick One, While He's Away", stating "We do feature normally Keith Moon singing, but today we'll just have to feature him.")

The group were concerned that Tommy had been promoted as "high art" by manager Kit Lambert and thought their stage show stood in equal importance to that album's rock-opera format. The group returned to England at the end of 1969 with a desire to release a live album from concerts recorded earlier in the US. However, Townshend balked at the prospect of listening to all the accumulated recordings to decide which would make the best album, and, according to Charlesworth, instructed sound engineer Bob Pridden to burn the tapes, (Note: Townshend later suggested the tapes were indeed burnt in his back garden, though archive live recordings of the Tommy tour have since been officially released.) an order Townshend retrospectively called "one of the stupidest decisions of my life."

Two shows were consequently scheduled, one at the University of Leeds and the other in Hull, for the express purpose of recording and releasing a live album. The Leeds concert was booked and arranged by Simon Brogan, who later became an assistant manager on tour with Jethro Tull. The shows were performed on 14 February 1970 at Leeds and on 15 February at Hull, but technical problems with the recordings from the Hull gig—the bass guitar had not been recorded on some of the songs—made it all the more necessary for the show from the 14th to be released as the album. Townshend subsequently mixed the live tapes, intending to release a double album, but then decided on a single album with six tracks. The full show opened with Entwistle's "Heaven And Hell" and included most of Tommy, but these were left off the album in place of earlier hits and more obscure material. According to David Hepworth, because there was no microphone pointed towards the audience, crowd noise was a "distant presence, as distant as the traffic outside," making the recording "a faithful account of what the band played and nothing more."

== Songs ==
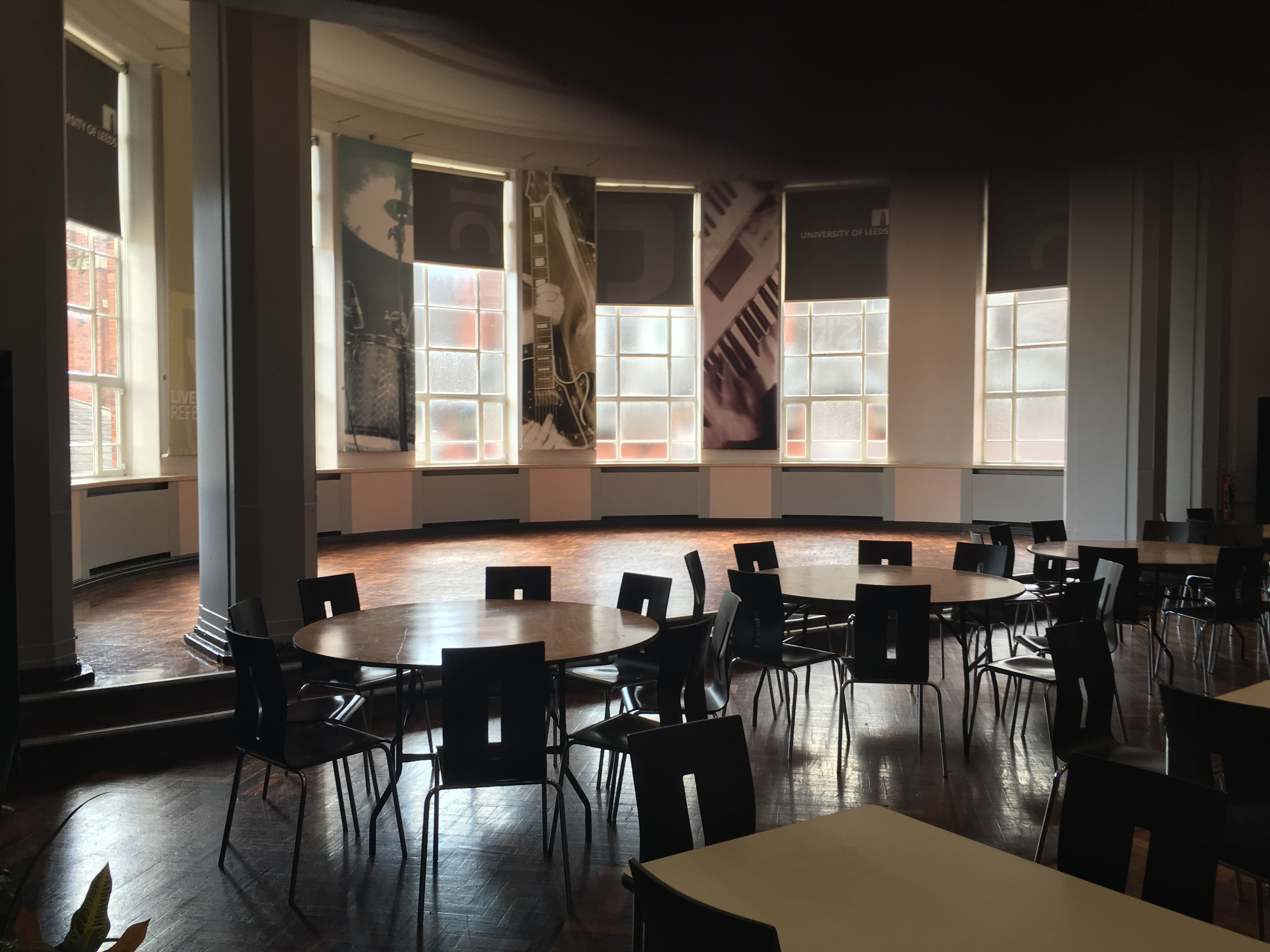
University of Leeds Refectory stage circa 2019

The album opens with "Young Man Blues", an R&B tune that was a standard part of the Who's stage repertoire at the time. It was extended to include an instrumental jam with stop-start sections. "Substitute", a 1966 single for the band, was played similarly to the studio version. "Summertime Blues" was rearranged to include power chords, a key change, and Entwistle singing the authority figure lines (e.g.: "Like to help you son, but you're too young to vote") in a deep-bass voice. "Shakin' All Over" was arranged similar to the original, but the chorus line was slowed down for effect, and there was a jam session in the middle.

Side two begins with a 15-minute rendition of "My Generation", which was greatly extended to include a medley of other songs and various improvisations. These include a brief extract of "See Me, Feel Me" and the ending of "Sparks" from Tommy, and part of "Naked Eye" that was recorded for the follow-up album Lifehouse (which was ultimately abandoned in favour of Who's Next). The album closes with "Magic Bus", which included Daltrey playing harmonica and an extended ending to the song.

== Release ==
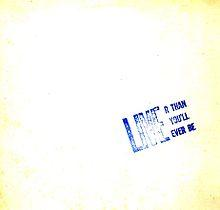
The rubber-stamped cover of the bootleg Live'r Than You'll Ever Be inspired the cover

The original LP was released on 11 May 1970. The cover was designed by Graphreaks with the rubber stamp logo created by Beadrall Sutcliffe. It resembled that of a bootleg LP of the era, parodying the Rolling Stones' Live'r Than You'll Ever Be. It contains plain brown cardboard with "The Who Live at Leeds" printed on it in plain blue or red block letters as if stamped on with ink (on the original first English pressing of 300, this stamp is black). The original cover opened out, gatefold-style, and had a pocket on either side of the interior, with the record in a paper sleeve on one side and 12 facsimiles of various memorabilia on the other, including a photo of the band from the My Generation photoshoot in March 1965, handwritten lyrics to the "Listening to You" chorus from Tommy, the typewritten lyrics to "My Generation", with hand written notes, a receipt for smoke bombs, a rejection letter from EMI, and the early black "Maximum R&B" poster showing Pete Townshend wind-milling his Rickenbacker. The first pressing included a copy of the contract for the Who to play at the Woodstock Festival.

The label was handwritten and included instructions to the engineers not to attempt to remove any crackling noise. This is probably a reference to the clicking and popping on the pre-remastered version (such as in "Shakin' All Over"). Modern digital remastering techniques allowed this to be removed, and also allowed some of the worst-affected tracks from the gig to be used; on CD releases, the label reads, "Crackling noises have been corrected!"

=== Reissues ===
The album was reissued on CD for the 25th anniversary in 1995; this version more than doubled the length of the release, but excluded the performance of "Tommy" except for one song. In 2001, a 2 CD deluxe edition was released, with the first set and the encore on the first disc and "Tommy" on the second disc.

For the 40th anniversary of the concert in 2010, a box set was released with the Leeds concert and the Hull concert the following day. Both follow the pattern of the deluxe edition, with "Tommy" on the second disc. Part of the bass track from the Hull show was missing from the master tape, which was replaced with the performance from the Leeds gig where necessary. In 2017, the album was reissued on heavyweight vinyl, with a replica of the original 1970 LP's packaging.

In 2014 a download-only remaster was released, also called "deluxe edition"; this is the first version featuring all songs in the original running order, and includes more of the stage banter.

== Critical reception ==
Professional ratings
Review scores
| Source | Rating |
|---|---|
| AllMusic | 5/5 stars |
| Blender | 5/5 stars |
| Christgau's Record Guide | B |
| The Encyclopedia of Popular Music | 5/5 stars |
| Entertainment Weekly | A+ |
| Mojo | 5/5 stars |
| Q | 4/5 stars |
| The Rolling Stone Album Guide | 5/5 stars |
| Uncut | 4/5 stars |

In a review for The New York Times, music critic Nik Cohn praised Live at Leeds as "the definitive hard-rock holocaust" and "the best live rock album ever made". Jonathan Eisen of Circus magazine felt that it flowed better than Tommy and that not since that album had there been one "quite so incredibly heavy, so inspired with the kind of kinetic energy that The Who have managed to harness here." Greil Marcus, writing in Rolling Stone, was less enthusiastic and said that, while Townshend's packaging for the album was "a tour-de-force of the rock and roll imagination", the music was dated and uneventful. He felt that Live at Leeds functioned simply as a document of "the formal commercial end of the first great stage of [The Who's] great career."

In Christgau's Record Guide: Rock Albums of the Seventies (1981), Robert Christgau asserted that, although side one was valuable for the live covers and "Substitute", "My Generation" and the "uncool-at-any-length" "Magic Bus" were not an improvement over their "raw" album versions. In a retrospective review for AllMusic, Bruce Eder felt that the album was seen as a model of excellence for live rock and roll during the 1970s; that it was the Who's best up to that point, and that there was "certainly no better record of how this band was a volcano of violence on-stage, teetering on the edge of chaos but never blowing apart." In a review of its 1995 CD reissue, Tom Sinclair of Entertainment Weekly asserted that it showed why the Who were important: "Few bands ever moved a mountain of sound around with this much dexterity and power." Mojo magazine wrote that "the future for rock as it became, in all its pomp and circumstance, began right here." Steven Hyden, writing for PopMatters, said that it was "not only the best live rock 'n' roll album ever, but the best rock album period." Roy Carr of Classic Rock, reviewing the 2010 reissue, remarked how the new Live at Hull section "is noticeably more tight, more focused and even more aggressive" than the original recording, concluding that "we now have the two greatest live rock albums...ever."

Who biographer Dave Marsh has praised the album as "so molten with energy at times it resembles the heavy metal of Deep Purple and the atomic blues of Led Zeppelin ..... absolutely non-stop hard rock".

=== Accolades ===
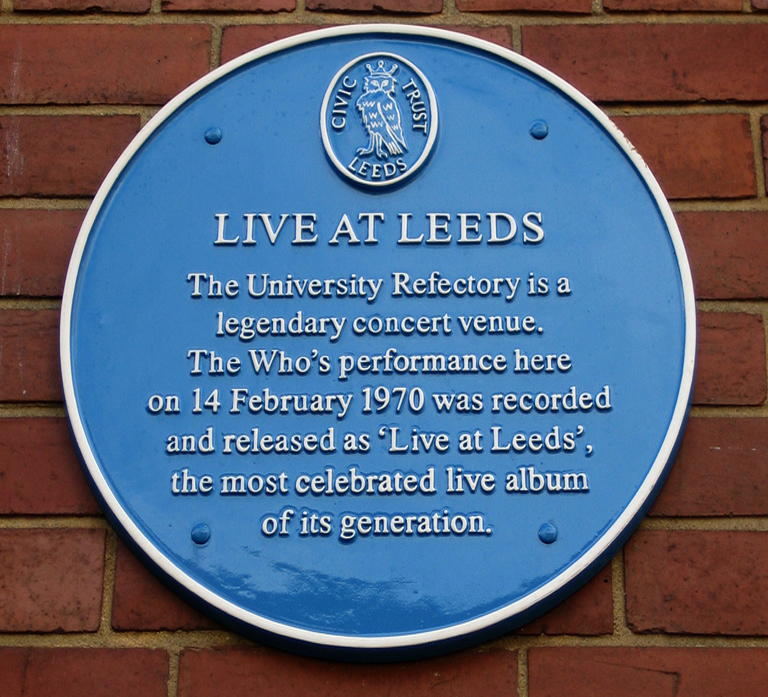
Blue plaque at the University of Leeds commemorating the album

Live at Leeds has been cited as the best live rock recording of all time by The Daily Telegraph, The Independent, the BBC, Q magazine, and Rolling Stone. In 2003, it was ranked number 170 on Rolling Stone's list of the 500 greatest albums of all time, maintaining the rating in a 2012 revised list, and dropping to number 327 in 2020. A Rolling Stone readers' poll in 2012 ranked it the best live album of all time. It was ranked number 356 in Colin Larkin's All Time Top 1000 Albums.

A commemorative blue plaque has been placed at the campus at which it was recorded, the University of Leeds Refectory. On 17 June 2006, over 36 years after the original concert, the Who returned to perform at the Refectory, at a gig organised by Andy Kershaw. Kershaw hailed it as "among the most magnificent I have ever seen".

"Even today, Live at Leeds sounds so alive," remarked Rush bassist Geddy Lee. "It's a real piece of that period of rock. It's like a bootleg: the artwork, the tone… It was raw."

== Track listing ==
=== Original Release (1970) ===
All tracks are written by Pete Townshend, except where noted.

Side one
| No. | Title | Writer(s) | Length |
|---|---|---|---|
| 1. | "Young Man Blues" | Mose Allison | 4:52 |
| 2. | "Substitute" | | 2:23 |
| 3. | "Summertime Blues" | Jerry Capehart, Eddie Cochran | 3:27 |
| 4. | "Shakin' All Over" | Johnny Kidd | 4:24 |
| Total length: | | | 15:06 |

Side two
| No. | Title | Length |
|---|---|---|
| 1. | "My Generation" | 14:47 |
| 2. | "Magic Bus" | 7:50 |
| Total length: | | 22:37 (37:43) |

=== 25th Anniversary Edition (1995) ===
All tracks are written by Pete Townshend, except where noted.

| No. | Title | Writer(s) | Length |
|---|---|---|---|
| 1. | "Heaven And Hell" | John Entwistle | 4:50 |
| 2. | "I Can't Explain" | | 2:58 |
| 3. | "Fortune Teller" | Naomi Neville (pseudonym of Allen Toussaint) | 2:34 |
| 4. | "Tattoo" | | 3:42 |
| 5. | "Young Man Blues" | Mose Allison | 5:51 |
| 6. | "Substitute" | | 2:07 |
| 7. | "Happy Jack" | | 2:13 |
| 8. | "I'm a Boy" | | 4:41 |
| 9. | "A Quick One, While He's Away" | | 8:41 |
| 10. | "Amazing Journey / Sparks" | | 7:54 |
| 11. | "Summertime Blues" | Jerry Capehart, Eddie Cochran | 3:20 |
| 12. | "Shakin' All Over" | Johnny Kidd | 4:34 |
| 13. | "My Generation" | | 15:46 |
| 14. | "Magic Bus" | | 7:46 |
| Total length: | | | 76:57 |

=== Deluxe Edition (2001) ===
All tracks are written by Pete Townshend, except where noted.

Disc 1
| No. | Title | Writer(s) | Length |
|---|---|---|---|
| 1. | "Heaven And Hell" | John Entwistle | 5:06 |
| 2. | "I Can't Explain" | | 2:26 |
| 3. | "Fortune Teller" | Naomi Neville (pseudonym of Allen Toussaint) | 2:34 |
| 4. | "Tattoo" | | 3:00 |
| 5. | "Young Man Blues" | Mose Allison | 5:14 |
| 6. | "Substitute" | | 2:07 |
| 7. | "Happy Jack" | | 2:13 |
| 8. | "I'm a Boy" | | 2:45 |
| 9. | "A Quick One, While He's Away" | | 8:39 |
| 10. | "Summertime Blues" | Jerry Capehart, Eddie Cochran | 3:21 |
| 11. | "Shakin' All Over" | Johnny Kidd | 4:34 |
| 12. | "My Generation" | | 15:24 |
| 13. | "Magic Bus" | | 7:54 |
| Total length: | | | 65:17 |

Disc 2
| No. | Title | Writer(s) | Length |
|---|---|---|---|
| 1. | "Overture" | | 6:51 |
| 2. | "It's a Boy" | | 0:31 |
| 3. | "1921" | | 2:25 |
| 4. | "Amazing Journey" | | 3:17 |
| 5. | "Sparks" | | 4:21 |
| 6. | "Eyesight To The Blind (The Hawker)" | Sonny Boy Williamson II | 1:58 |
| 7. | "Christmas" | | 3:18 |
| 8. | "The Acid Queen" | | 3:34 |
| 9. | "Pinball Wizard" | | 2:52 |
| 10. | "Do You Think It’s Alright?" | | 0:21 |
| 11. | "Fiddle About" | John Entwistle | 1:13 |
| 12. | "Tommy, Can You Hear Me?" | | 0:55 |
| 13. | "There’s A Doctor" | | 0:22 |
| 14. | "Go to the Mirror!" | | 3:24 |
| 15. | "Smash the Mirror" | | 1:18 |
| 16. | "Miracle Cure" | | 0:12 |
| 17. | "Sally Simpson" | | 4:00 |
| 18. | "I'm Free" | | 2:28 |
| 19. | "Tommy’s Holiday Camp" | Keith Moon | 1:00 |
| 20. | "We're Not Gonna Take It" | | 8:47 |
| Total length: | | | 53:07 (118:24) |

== Personnel ==
- Roger Daltrey – lead vocals, harmonica
- Pete Townshend – guitar, backing and lead vocals
- John Entwistle – bass, backing and lead vocals
- Keith Moon – drums, backing vocals

== Charts ==
| Chart (1970) | Peak position |
|---|---|
| Australian Albums (Kent Music Report) | 6 |
| Canada Top Albums/CDs (RPM) | 2 |
| Danish Album Charts | 8 |
| Dutch Albums (Album Top 100) | 4 |
| Finnish Albums (Suomen virallinen lista) | 10 |
| German Albums (Offizielle Top 100) | 8 |
| Italian Albums (Musica e Dischi) | 19 |
| Norwegian Albums (VG-lista) | 13 |
| UK Albums (Official Charts) | 3 |
| US Billboard 200 | 4 |

== Certifications ==
| Region | Certification | Certified units/sales |
|---|---|---|
| Canada (Music Canada) | Gold | 50,000^{^} |
| United Kingdom (BPI) | Gold | 100,000^{^} |
| United States (RIAA) | 2× Platinum | 2,000,000^{^} |
^{^} Shipments figures based on certification alone.
