= Shakin' All Over =

1960 song by Johnny Kidd & the Pirates

Single by Johnny Kidd & the Pirates
- B-side: "Yes Sir, That's My Baby"
- Released: June 1960 (UK)
- Recorded: 13 May 1960 (9 June 1959 "Yes, Sir")
- Studio: Abbey Road (London)
- Genre: R&B; rock and roll
- Length: 2:15
- Label: His Master's Voice POP 753 (UK)
- Songwriter: Johnny Kidd
- Producer: Walter Ridley

Johnny Kidd & the Pirates singles chronology
"You Got What It Takes" (1960)	"Shakin' All Over" (1960)	"Restless" (1960)

"Shakin' All Over" is a song originally performed by Johnny Kidd & the Pirates. It was written by leader Johnny Kidd, and his original recording reached No. 1 on the UK singles chart in August 1960. The song is sometimes credited to Frederick Albert Heath, which is Kidd's real name. Kidd's recording was not a hit outside Europe. In other parts of the world the song is better known by recordings from other artists.

A version by Chad Allan and the Expressions, later known as the Guess Who, was recorded in December 1964. It reached No. 1 in Canada in the spring of 1965, No. 22 in the US and No. 27 in Australia. Another famous recording by the Who was featured on their 1970 album Live at Leeds.

Normie Rowe's 1965 version reached No. 1 in Australia as a double A-side with "Que Sera Sera".

== History ==
=== Johnny Kidd version ===
The musicians who performed on the original recording were Johnny Kidd (vocals), Alan Caddy (rhythm guitar), Brian Gregg (bass), Clem Cattini (drums) and Joe Moretti (lead guitar). Kidd was quoted as saying:

When I was going round with a bunch of lads and we happened to see a girl who was a real sizzler, we used to say that she gave us 'quivers down the membranes'. It was a standard saying with us referring to any attractive girl. I can honestly say that it was this more than anything that inspired me to write "Shakin' All Over".

=== The Guess Who version ===
The song gained more fame after it was recorded in Winnipeg in December 1964 by a group called Chad Allan and the Expressions. In the spring of 1965, the record became a No. 1 hit in Canada. The group's label Quality Records credited the artist as "Guess Who?" in an attempt to disguise their origin and hint that the group might be a British Invasion act. The actual name was revealed a few months later, but radio DJs continued to announce the artist as "Guess Who?". This prompted the group to change their name to the Guess Who. This version was also a No. 22 hit in the United States. In 1975, the Guess Who recorded a new song called "When the Band Was Singin' 'Shakin' All Over'". Though it makes lyrical reference to the original, this is a distinctly different song.

=== Normie Rowe version ===
The Guess Who's version also became a No. 27 hit in Australia, but another version became a national No. 1 hit in late 1965 for Normie Rowe. Rowe's version (backed by "Que Sera Sera") was one of the biggest-selling singles of the decade in that country. Rowe had recorded his take on the song before the Guess Who, and based his release on a 1962 version by Johnny Chester.

=== The Who version ===
"Shakin' All Over"

Song by the Who

from the album Live at Leeds
- Released: 16 May 1970
- Recorded: 14 February 1970
- Genre: Hard rock
- Length: 4:20
- Label: Decca; MCA
- Songwriter: Johnny Kidd
- Producers: Jon Astley; Kit Lambert; the Who

The song has been performed many times by the Who, starting in the 1960s (sometimes in a medley with "Spoonful"). The best known performances were at Woodstock in 1969 and on Live at Leeds in 1970. In Randy Bachman's autobiography, he says that when he met Who bass player John Entwistle, he was told that people constantly got the Who and the Guess Who mixed up. Tired of being yelled at for not playing the song, the Who started playing it just to keep the crowd happy. Bachman responded that the Guess Who had the same reasons for playing "My Generation". Entwistle, a fan of 1950s and 1960s rock and roll and rockabilly music, also performed the song with his solo band and incorporated a bass solo into the middle of the song, accompanied only by his drummer Steve Luongo.
