= Rotosound =

Guitar and bass string manufacturer based in England

Rotosound Manufacturing Limited
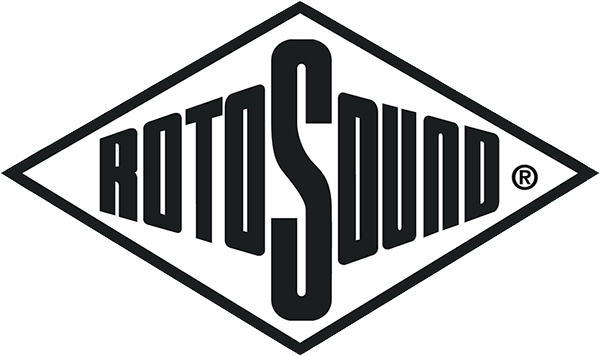
- Industry: Music
- Founded: 1958; 68 years ago
- Headquarters: Sevenoaks, Kent, England
- Key people: James How (founder); Jason How (chairman)
- Products: Guitar strings
- Website: www.rotosound.com

Rotosound is a British guitar and bass string manufacturing company based in England.

== History ==
Rotosound was started in the late 1950s by James How, a musician and engineer by trade. How started manufacturing music strings for many famous artists across the world. As of 2022 It was still a family-run business, making all Rotosound strings in England.

Rotosound's most famous string set, the RS66 Swing Bass, was first produced in 1966. John Entwistle of The Who came to the Rotosound factory looking for an even-sounding, heavy, roundwound bass string. Entwistle spent the afternoon there, trying string after string before settling on a set that would become known as Swing Bass 66. A fake jingle for Rotosound can be heard on The Who's 1967 album The Who Sell Out, immediately preceding "I Can See for Miles". This jingle would later be covered by the American band Shellac on their album Excellent Italian Greyhound and Petra Haden on Petra Haden Sings: The Who Sell Out.

Rotosound make a number of "signature" string sets made to the specific specification of several artists such as Billy Sheehan and Steve Harris of Iron Maiden.
