= Direct Hits (The Who album) =

Compilation album by the Who
- Released: October 1968
- Recorded: 1966–1968
- Genre: Rock
- Length: 32:49
- Label: Track/Polydor

The Who UK chronology
The Who Sell Out (1967)	Direct Hits (1968)	Tommy (1969)

Professional ratings
Review scores
Source	Rating
Allmusic	3.5/5 stars
The Encyclopedia of Popular Music	3/5 stars
Rolling Stone	(favorable)

Direct Hits is the first UK compilation album and the fourth UK LP released by the Who. It collects singles, B-sides, and album tracks originally recorded for Reaction Records and Track Records between 1966 and 1968.

Earlier Who recordings from 1965, such as "My Generation", were released in the UK by Brunswick Records and were not available for this release due to music licensing issues. Thus the collection is not representative of the Who's hit recordings up to this point.

Direct Hits shares a few songs with the earlier US compilation album Magic Bus: The Who on Tour, but is otherwise unrelated to that release. Surprisingly, it does not include the song "Magic Bus", which had reached No. 26 on the UK Singles Chart during the summer of 1968. Until the early 1980s this was the only album to include Who rarities such as "In the City", "Dogs", and a version of the Rolling Stones' song "The Last Time".

== Release history ==
Original 1968 UK LP copies were released in both stereo and mono. The album did not sell as well as other UK Who albums and it was deleted in the 1970s. It was released in Czechoslovakia in 1985 with a different artwork titled The Best of The Who. It was also re-issued on vinyl in 1980 in Japan. In 2006 the mono version was made available in the US as a limited-edition vinyl re-issue by Classic Records. This release was pressed in regular weight (150 gram) and heavy weight (200 gram) versions.

A CD version was released as a limited edition in Japan in 2007, which is one of only a few releases with the original mono single version of "I Can See for Miles" on an authorized CD.

== Track listing ==
All songs written by Pete Townshend except where noted.

Side one
No.	Title	Writer(s)	Original release	Length
1.	"Bucket T"	Don Altfeld, Roger Christian, Dean Torrence	Ready Steady Who (EP), 1966	2:08
2.	"I'm a Boy"		Single A-Side, 1966	2:36
3.	"Pictures of Lily"		Single A-Side, 1967	2:43
4.	"Doctor! Doctor!"	John Entwistle	B side of "Pictures of Lily", 1967	2:53
5.	"I Can See for Miles"		The Who Sell Out, 1967	3:55
6.	"Substitute"		Single A-Side, 1966	3:47

Side two
No.	Title	Writer(s)	Original release	Length
1.	"Happy Jack"		Single A-Side, 1966	2:11
2.	"The Last Time"	Mick Jagger, Keith Richards	Single A-Side, 1967	2:50
3.	"In the City"	Entwistle, Keith Moon	B side of "I'm a Boy", 1966	2:19
4.	"Call Me Lightning"		B side of "Dogs", 1968	2:19
5.	"Mary Anne with the Shaky Hand"		The Who Sell Out	2:05
6.	"Dogs"		Single A-Side, 1968	3:03
