= Tattoo (The Who song) =

Song by The Who

Song by the Who

from the album The Who Sell Out
- Released: 15 December 1967
- Recorded: 12 October 1967
- Studio: IBC, London
- Genre: Pop
- Length: 2:42
- Label: Track
- Songwriter: Pete Townshend
- Producer: Kit Lambert

"Tattoo" is a song written by Pete Townshend that was first released by the English rock band the Who on their third studio album The Who Sell Out (1967). A "rite of passage" song, "Tattoo" tells the story of two teenaged brothers who decide to get tattoos in their attempts to become men. Themes of the song include peer pressure to conform and young men's insecurity about their manhood. The song has been heavily praised by critics and has appeared on several of the Who's live and compilation albums. It has also been covered by Tommy Keene and Petra Haden.

== Lyrics and music ==
"Tattoo" is a "rite of passage" song. The singer sings that he and his brother, as teenagers, were discussing "what makes a man a man". They decided to get tattoos. Their abusive father disapproved of the tattoos and beat the singer. However, his equally abusive mother approved the singer's tattoo, which said "Mother", but beat the brother because the brother got a tattoo of "a lady in the nude". The song ends with the singer revealing that he is now "tattooed all over" and his "wife is tattooed too".

Themes of the song include peer pressure to conform and young men's insecurity about their manhood. Townshend has said that the inspiration for the song came from memories from the time he was about eleven or twelve years old of seeing men with tattoos all up and down their arms, and being concerned that that would happen to him eventually. Townshend originally did not expect Who lead singer Roger Daltrey to be willing to sing such a song about questioning one's manhood, and when Daltrey sang it, and well, Townshend realised that despite his bravado Daltrey shared many of the insecurities Townshend had. Townshend has also stated that the song was written as an album track at a time he had begun to feel that his guitar playing was being overshadowed by the likes of Jimi Hendrix and so he decided to start writing "a different kind of song...story–songs, cameos, essays on human experience."

"Tattoo" begins with arpeggios played on both electric and acoustic guitar. The song is mixed such that the electric guitar is heard only through the left stereo channel and the acoustic guitar is heard only through the right stereo channel. Author Chris Charlesworth describes the melody as being "particularly attractive and mature" and also comments on the "unusually complex rhymes" used. Authors Steve Grantley and Alan Parker praise Daltrey's vocal performance, noting that it "intrigues and seduces" and finds him projecting an uncharacteristically "passive, pensive mood". Who author John Atkins praises the "immaculate" vocal harmonies and imaginative instrumentation.

The Who recorded "Tattoo" on 12 October 1967 at IBC Studios.

== Critical reception ==
Music critic Robert Christgau considers "Tattoo" one of his three favourite songs from The Who Sell Out, an album he considered the Who's "only great album" at the time, and one with "no bad songs". Rolling Stone magazine considers "Tattoo" to be "one of those gems of guitar playing from Pete Townshend, one which shows flawless mastery of rock and roll chording." AllMusic critic Richie Unterberger states that "Tattoo" "shows introspective, vulnerable sides to the singer/songwriter that had previously been hidden." Charlesworth calls it a "standout track" and "one of [Townshend's] finest 'rite of passage' songs". Grantley and Parker note that "Tattoo" is "full of pathos" and "an excellent example of Townshend finding in the humdrum something of universal resonance and appeal." Atkins, calling the song "masterly" puts forth similar views, and Atkins and Grantley and Parker all find that this element of the song is a characteristic that only the Kinks might be able to match.

== Other appearances ==
"Tattoo" is one of Townshend's favourite songs, and it was included in the Who's live repertoire into the mid-1970s. Live versions of the song were released on the 1995 CD version of the 1970 album Live at Leeds and the video The Who at Kilburn: 1977 (although the performance on the video was actually from the London Coliseum). The song was also included on the compilation album Thirty Years of Maximum R&B. The song was also played occasionally on The Who Tour 1982 tour with Kenney Jones on drums.

"Tattoo" has also been covered by Tommy Keene on The Real Underground and by Petra Haden on Petra Haden Sings: The Who Sell Out. It was also included on the Pete Townshend and Raphael Rudd album The Oceanic Concerts.
