= Mary Anne with the Shaky Hand =

Song by the Who

Single by the Who

from the album The Who Sell Out
- B-side: "I Can't Reach You"
- Released: 2 February 1968
- Recorded: 24 October 1967
- Studio: De Lane Lea, London
- Genre: Folk rock; jangle pop; psychedelic folk
- Length: 2:28 (album version); 2:09 (Norwegian single edit); 3:16 ("electric" single version)
- Label: Track
- Songwriter: Pete Townshend
- Producer: Kit Lambert

"Mary Anne with the Shaky Hand" is a song by the English rock band the Who. It was written by Pete Townshend and released on their 1967 album The Who Sell Out. The best known version of the song has an arrangement using acoustic guitar and Latin percussion instruments.

The song has ambiguous lyrics that have been subject to a variety of interpretations. At least five different recordings of the song have been officially released by the Who.

== Lyrics and music ==
Unlike many Who songs from the 1960s, "Mary Anne with the Shaky Hand" recalls the typical pop song convention of praising a pretty girl but does not provide any description of her appearance, focusing instead on Mary Anne's hand tremor. The reason for the shaking is not clear: Mary Anne may have some affliction and/or the song may be, as Chris Charlesworth describes it, the Who's "second great song about masturbation" (after the band's 1967 single "Pictures of Lily"): Steve Grantley and Alan Parker suggest that the reason can be inferred from the line "What they do to a man, those shaky hands." However, some versions of the song use the lyrics: "What they've done to her, man, those shaky hands." Rolling Stone praised the "barely-beneath-the-surface humor of the lyric". Townshend has also introduced the song with "This next one's written in very bad taste", as on Live at the Royal Albert Hall.

The song has a melody described by AllMusic's Mark Deming as "charming" and "a tune you couldn't forget even if you tried". Author John Atkins describes the song as a "delightful pop song in the Everly Brothers mold", while Charlesworth suggests that, regardless of the lyrics, the song "would have been a winner on melody alone". Grantley and Parker describe the vocals as a cross between the Mamas and the Papas and Simon and Garfunkel.

== Who recordings ==
The acoustic guitar version on The Who Sell Out album was recorded at De Lane Lea Studios on 24 October 1967. This was released in different stereo and mono mixes. The mono album mix uses a tremolo effect at the end on the words "shaky hand".

A different studio version, using electric guitar, was released in 1967 as the B-side of the "I Can See for Miles" single in the US and Australia. The B-side version, with the alternate title "Mary-Anne with the Shaky Hands", was released in mono. This version also has a tremolo effect on the vocal. A later stereo remix of this version was also included on the 1998 remastered version of the Odds and Sods album.

An "alternative" studio version was recorded at Mirasound Studios in New York City in 1967 using electric guitar but also featuring Al Kooper on organ. This version was a bonus track on the 1995 remastered version of The Who Sell Out. The notes for this album incorrectly state that it was the B-side version, however, it was actually the second version on the B-side. In 2021 the Who released a "Super Deluxe" edition of The Who Sell Out that contained a previously unreleased 1967 Townshend home demo of the song.

A live version, recorded on 27 November 2000, was released on the 2003 Live at the Royal Albert Hall album. When introducing the song, Pete Townshend says, "This one's in very bad taste".

== Other appearances ==
The song has been released with several title variations: "Mary Anne with the Shaky Hands"; "Mary-Anne with the Shaky Hands" (on the MCA LP); and "Mary Anne with the Shakey Hand".

"Mary Anne with the Shaky Hand" was also used as the B-side of the "Magic Bus" single in Norway. It has also been included on several compilation albums. The acoustic version was included on the 1968 compilation album Direct Hits. The mono B-side version was included on the 1985 compilation album Who's Missing.

The song was also included on the 1994 compilation album Rarities Volume I & Volume II. The acoustic version was also included in the box set Thirty Years of Maximum R&B. It was released as a single in the Netherlands backed with "I Can't Reach You".
