= Hollywood Dream =

Studio album by Thunderclap Newman
- Released: September 1970
- Recorded: 1969
- Genre: Rock
- Length: 47:41
- Label: Track
- Producer: Pete Townshend

Singles from Hollywood Dream
- 1. "Something in the Air" Released: 23 May 1969; 2. "Accidents" Released: 15 May 1970; 3. "The Reason" Released: 28 August 1970; 4. "Wild Country" Released: 13 November 1970

Professional ratings
Review scores
Source	Rating
AllMusic	4.5/5 stars
Christgau's Record Guide	B−
Classic Rock	8/10 stars
Music-News	4/5 stars

Hollywood Dream is the only studio album by British rock band Thunderclap Newman.

== Overview ==
The album was produced by The Who's guitarist and songwriter Pete Townshend, who was also responsible for the band's initial formation. Townshend helped the group to obtain a recording contract with Track Records, a company formed by Kit Lambert and Chris Stamp, who were managers of The Who. Townshend also played bass on the album, credited under the pseudonym "Bijou Drains", although the later CD releases do not credit him. Track Records licensed the recordings to Atlantic Records for initial release in the U.S.

The group's first single, "Something in the Air", was a UK number 1 hit and is the song for which Thunderclap Newman are best known. The single also reached #37 on the Billboard Hot 100 chart in the U.S. The album was recorded after the initial U.K. success of the first single.

The original 1970 release opened with "Hollywood #1", with the title track, an instrumental by young guitarist Jimmy McCulloch, appearing toward the end of Side 2. The album then culminated in a reprise of the opener, "Hollywood #2" (featuring a miscellany of instruments including soprano saxophones, glockenspiel, sleigh bells, a Japanese battle cymbal and a Chinese temple block), and finally "Something in the Air".

In 1973, the album was reissued in the U.S. by MCA Records with different cover art. For its CD release in 1991, "Something in the Air" was moved to the start of the record. This version also added the single versions of "Something In The Air" (different mix from the album version), "Accidents" and "The Reason", and the three non-album B-sides as bonus tracks.

"Something in the Air" makes a brief appearance in the 1969 film The Magic Christian starring Peter Sellers and Ringo Starr. It also appears on the accompanying soundtrack LP. The song also appears in the 1970 film The Strawberry Statement and the movie's soundtrack album.

== Track listing ==
All songs written by Speedy Keen unless otherwise stated.

Side one

1. "Hollywood #1" – 3:20
2. "The Reason" – 4:05
3. "Open the Door, Homer" (Bob Dylan) – 3:00
4. "Look Around" – 2:59
5. "Accidents" – 9:40

Side two

1. "Wild Country" – 4:14
2. "When I Think" – 3:06
3. "The Old Cornmill" – 3:58
4. "I Don't Know" – 3:44
5. "Hollywood Dream" (Instrumental) (Jack McCulloch, Jimmy McCulloch) – 3:06
6. "Hollywood #2" – 2:54
7. "Something in the Air" – 3:54

1991 CD reissue and bonus tracks

For this release, "Something in the Air" became the opening track and the album was augmented by the A and B-sides of the singles released by Thunderclap Newman.

13. "Something in the Air" (Single version) – 3:54
14. "Wilhelmina" (Andy Newman) – 2:56
15. "Accidents" (Single version) – 3:46
16. "I See It All" (Jack McCulloch, Jimmy McCulloch) – 2:46
17. "The Reason" (Single version) – 3:47
18. "Stormy Petrel" (Newman) – 2:57

== Personnel ==
Thunderclap Newman

- John "Speedy" Keen – lead vocals, drums, percussion, acoustic guitar, conga, glockenspiel, gong, maracas
- Andy Newman – piano, organ, soprano saxophone, bass saxophone, oboe, tin whistle, glockenspiel, cor anglais, flutes, Japanese battle cymbal, hand bell, finger cymbals, sleigh bells, Chinese temple block, vocals
- Jimmy McCulloch – acoustic guitar, electric guitar, maracas, wood block, backing vocals

Additional musicians

- Pete Townshend (originally credited as Bijou Drains) – bass, producer
- Chris Morphet – harmonica (tracks 4 & 5)
- Ian Green – string arrangement on "Something in the Air"

Production

- Graham Hughes – cover art
- Chris Morphet – album spread photographs
- Chris Stamp – special thanks
- Bill Levenson – CD reissue production
- Dennis Drake – CD reissue mastering at PolyGram Studios
