= Odorono =

Song by the Who

from the album The Who Sell Out
- Released: 15 December 1967
- Recorded: 11 October 1967
- Studio: IBC
- Genre: Art pop
- Length: 2:16
- Label: Track
- Songwriter: Pete Townshend
- Producer: Kit Lambert

"Odorono" is a song written by Pete Townshend that was first released by the English rock band the Who on their third studio album The Who Sell Out (1967). Townshend sings the lead vocal rather than usual Who lead singer Roger Daltrey. The song praises the virtues of an actual American deodorant named Odorono, branded by Edna Murphey.

== Lyrics and music ==
The concept behind The Who Sell Out was to make the album sound like a pirate radio station, including fake commercials between the songs. "Odorono" fitted with the concept by being a phony commercial for a brand of underarm deodorant, but it is also a substantial song in its own right. The lyrics tell the story of a woman singer who has just completed a successful performance and awaits a handsome man named Mr. Davidson to come backstage to congratulate her. In the words of Townshend, "it looks like she's all set, not only for stardom but also for true love". But when Mr. Davidson bends over to kiss her, her body odour turns him off, ruining her chances at both stardom and love. The song ends with the admonishment that "Her deodorant had let her down / She should have used Odorono".

The song represents the increasing importance of narrative in Townshend's songwriting. Townshend was proud of the song, stating that he "dug" it because "it was a little story, and although I thought it's a good song, it was about something groovy – underarm perspiration." Of the singer's hopes being disappointed, Townshend went on to say: "And you know, without getting too serious about it, because it's supposed to be very light, that's life. It really is. That really is life."

The Mr. Davidson in the song may have referred to Harold Davidson, who was a famous booking agent in London at the time the song was written. Although the song is a fake commercial, a real deodorant product named Odorono once existed.

The Who recorded "Odorono" on 11 October 1967 at IBC Studios. In addition to singing, Townshend plays rhythm guitar on the song.

== Critical reception ==
"Odorono" has been praised for its projection of bittersweet comedy. Rolling Stone said: "The girl who should have used Odorono is obviously meant to be a laugh, but it is bittersweet laughter. The Who have caught the embarrassing reality of it, and reality is the essence of humor." Authors Steve Grantley and Alan Parker comment on the song's "comical lyrics" while noting that it tells "a melancholy story". Author John Atkins calls the music "attractive" and the lyrics "amusing" and "melodramatic". John Dougan calls the song "an insightful critique of the entertainment industry's elevation of style and appearance over talent, as well as a satire of products as salvation" and states that "the song is unexpectedly heartfelt, partly the result of the anguish expressed in Townshend's voice and the story's cinematic quality". Dougan also remarks on "Odorono"'s "narrative arc and character development" and notes that these qualities allow the listener to sympathise with the singer and feel a little annoyed at Mr. Davidson's "insensitivity and superficiality".

== Other versions ==
The mono mix of "Odorono" differs significantly from the stereo mix, including a different lead guitar part.

Petra Haden covered the song on her 2005 album Petra Haden Sings: The Who Sell Out. Acme Rock Group covered the song on their 2001 album Star.
