= Petra Haden Sings: The Who Sell Out =

2005 album

Studio album by Petra Haden
- Released: February 22, 2005
- Genre: Indie rock; a cappella
- Language: English
- Label: Bar None
- Producer: Petra Haden; Mike Watt

Petra Haden chronology
Imaginaryland (1999)	Petra Haden Sings: The Who Sell Out (2005)

Professional ratings
Review scores
Source	Rating
Allmusic	2005
Pitchfork Media	7.0/10 2005
Rolling Stone	not rated 2005

Petra Haden Sings: The Who Sell Out is an album by Petra Haden, an entirely a cappella interpretation of the 1967 album The Who Sell Out by English rock band The Who. Haden supplies all of the vocals. It was released in 2005 on Bar None Records.

The recording was suggested by Haden's friend Mike Watt, who ranks Sell Out as one of his favorite albums and gave Haden an 8-track recorder she used to create the album.

Haden formed a ten-woman choir, dubbed Petra Haden & The Sellouts, to perform songs from the album live.

== Reception ==
In the Boston Globe on 13 March 2005, Pete Townshend, The Who's guitarist and principal songwriter, spoke positively about Haden's album:

I was a little embarrassed to realize I was enjoying my own music so much, for in a way it was like hearing it for the first time. What Petra does with her voice, which is not so easy to do, is challenge the entire rock framework ... When she does depart from the original music she does it purely to bring a little piece of herself -- and when she appears she is so very welcome. I felt like I'd received something better than a Grammy.

In his book Paddle Your Own Canoe, actor Nick Offerman recommends the album as ideal to listen to while building canoes.

== Track listing ==
1. "Armenia City in the Sky"
2. "Heinz Baked Beans"
3. "Mary Anne with the Shaky Hand"
4. "Odorono"
5. "Tattoo"
6. "Our Love Was"
7. "I Can See for Miles"
8. "I Can't Reach You"
9. "Medac"
10. "Relax"
11. "Silas Stingy"
12. "Sunrise"
13. "Rael"

== Listening ==
- Petra Haden and The Sell Outs performing "I Can See for Miles" on YouTube
