= This Is a Gardening Show =

- Directed by: Brook Linder
- Starring: Zach Galifianakis
- Music by: Cover of Something in the Air by Thunderclap Newman
- No. of seasons: 1
- No. of episodes: 6

Original release
- Network: Netflix
- Release: 22 April 2026

This Is a Gardening Show is a comedy documentary show on Netflix developed by and starring Zach Galifianakis.

== Premise ==
Each episode of the show follows Galifianakis as he learns more about a particular facet of gardening. Galifianakis visits farms around Vancouver Island, BC including a visit and interviews with elementary school students at an elementary school in Comox.
