= Thunderclap Newman =

English rock band

- Origin: London, England
- Genres: Rock; pop
- Years active: 1969–1971
- Label: Track
- Past members: Andy Newman; Speedy Keen; Jimmy McCulloch; Jim Avery; Jack McCulloch; Roger Felice; Ronnie Peel

Thunderclap Newman were a British rock band that Pete Townshend of the Who and Kit Lambert formed in 1969 in a bid to showcase the talents of John "Speedy" Keen, Jimmy McCulloch, and Andy "Thunderclap" Newman.

Their single, "Something in the Air", a 1969 UK number one hit, remains in demand for television commercials, film soundtracks and compilations. The band released a critically acclaimed rock album, Hollywood Dream, and three other singles from the album, "Accidents", "The Reason" and "Wild Country".

From 1969 until 1971, the nucleus of the band consisted of the songwriter John "Speedy" Keen (vocals, drums, guitar), Andy "Thunderclap" Newman (piano) and Jimmy McCulloch (guitar). Pete Townshend (using the alias "Bijou Drains") played bass guitar on their album and singles, all of which he had recorded and produced at the IBC Studio and his Twickenham home studio. The band augmented its personnel during its tours: in 1969 with James "Jim" Pitman-Avery (bass guitar) and Jack McCulloch (drums) and in early 1971, with Australian musicians Roger Felice (drums) and Ronnie Peel (bass guitar). The band folded in late 1971.

== Career ==
In 1969, Townshend created the band to showcase songs written by the former Who chauffeur, drummer, singer, and guitarist, Keen. The opening track on The Who Sell Out album, "Armenia City in the Sky", was written by Keen. Newman, McCulloch, and Keen met each other for the first time in December 1968 or January 1969, at Townshend's home studio, to record "Something in the Air". Townshend produced the single, played its bass guitar under the pseudonym Bijou Drains, and hired GPO engineer and Dixieland jazz pianist "Thunderclap" Newman (born Andrew Laurence Newman, 21 November 1942, Hounslow, Middlesex, died 30 March 2016) and the fifteen-year-old Glaswegian guitarist Jimmy McCulloch. Before then, Townshend had planned to work on projects for each of the musicians, but Kit Lambert prevailed upon Townshend, who was working on what became the rock-opera Tommy, to save time by coalescing the three musicians into the collective project that became Thunderclap Newman.

"Something in the Air", which Keen wrote, was number one on the UK Singles Chart for three weeks, replacing the Beatles' "Ballad of John and Yoko" and holding off Elvis Presley. Originally it was titled "Revolution", but later renamed because the Beatles had released a song of that name in 1968, the B-side of "Hey Jude". By December 1969, the single had been awarded a gold disc for worldwide sales of more than a million.

"Something in the Air" appeared on the soundtracks of the films The Magic Christian (1969) and The Strawberry Statement (1970), the latter having helped the single reach number 37 in the United States. In the UK and US, a follow-up single, "Accidents", came out in May 1970 and charted at number 44 for only a week, but did not chart at all in the US. "Something in the Air" was also in the film Kingpin (1996) and is used on the soundtrack. It was also used in Almost Famous (2000) and is on the soundtrack. The song also figures prominently in the introduction to the 2026 streaming episodic series This Is a Gardening Show.

Thunderclap Newman had not planned to undertake live performances, but the band relented when, to their collective surprise, "Something in the Air" became a chart success. The trio, augmented by Jim Pitman-Avery (bass guitar) and McCulloch's elder brother Jack (drums), undertook a 26-date tour of England and Scotland, in support of Deep Purple, from July 1969 to August 1969. On 8 August, Pitman-Avery and McCulloch announced their intention to leave the band. Within weeks, they had formed the country-rock band Wild Country with Terry Keyworth (guitar) and Stuart Whitcombe (keyboards). That year, the band appeared in television programmes in Britain (How Late It Is, Top of the Pops) and Germany (Beat-Club).

In October 1970, Thunderclap Newman released its critically acclaimed album, Hollywood Dream. Produced by Townshend, the album peaked at number 163 on the Billboard 200. That year, they released three singles: "Accidents/I See It All", "The Reason/Stormy Petrel" and "Wild Country/Hollywood Dream". On 7 November, they appeared on Ev (also known as The Kenny Everett Show). In early 1971, the founding trio reformed with the Australian musicians Roger Felice (drums) and Ronnie Peel (bass guitar).

On 6 March 1971, New Musical Express (NME) reported the band's personnel change:

Thunderclap Newman has finally settled down into a five-piece group, with two new members being brought in—although on certain dates, the outfit may be augmented by a brass section. Permanent line-up now comprises Newman (piano), Speedy Keen (rhythm guitar and vocals), Jimmy McCulloch (lead guitar), Ronnie Peel (bass) and Roger Felice (drums). Dates include University of Sussex (tomorrow, Saturday), Sheffield University (12 March) and Nelson Imperial (14). A Scottish tour is being set for the end of April.

With its new line-up, Thunderclap Newman supported Deep Purple from January 1971 to April 1971, during a 19-date tour of England and Scotland. At some time during those months, the band supported Leon Russell during a tour of the Netherlands and supported Deep Purple during a tour of Scandinavia. They played the club circuit and avoided playing in ballrooms. That year, Thunderclap Newman made a cameo appearance in the British movie Not Tonight, Darling (1971).

Thunderclap Newman broke up around 10 April 1971, days before they were scheduled to start a tour of Scotland, and weeks before they were scheduled to be part of a package tour with Marsha Hunt and others during the Who's 12-week tour of the US.

The members of the band had little in common. In a 1972 NME interview, Newman said that he got on with Keen's music but not with Keen personally, while the exact opposite was true with regard to McCulloch.

In 2008, Newman appeared on an episode of the British television programme Those Were the Days to comment upon the night of the first Moon landing, when Thunderclap Newman had performed an almost-night-long concert.

== Separate ways ==
McCulloch had stints with a dozen or more bands, including John Mayall, Stone the Crows, and Paul McCartney's Wings but, on 25 September 1979, at the age of 26, he died in his home from a cardiac arrest. His body was discovered by his brother, Jack, two days later.

In 1973, Keen released a solo album for Track, entitled Previous Convictions, which featured McCulloch and Roger Felice on some tracks. He began recording a double album as a follow-up. Frustrated by his lack of progress at Track, he took the demos to Island Records, which pared it down to the single album Y'know Wot I Mean? and released it in 1975. Its single, "Someone to Love", received significant airplay but failed to chart.

Discouraged, Keen ceased recording after one more single in 1976. He tried his hand at record producing, working with the punk band Johnny Thunders and the Heartbreakers on their first album L.A.M.F. in 1977, and also produced Motörhead's first album before leaving the music industry.

Keen suffered from arthritis for several years, and was recording his third solo album, when he unexpectedly died of heart failure on 12 March 2002, at the age of 56.

In 1971, Newman recorded a solo album, Rainbow, and played assorted instruments on Roger Ruskin Spear's first album.

In 2002, Newman was eventually coaxed out of retirement by István Etiam and David Buckley (ex-Barracudas). Another three musicians were added to the line-up and in late 2005 the Thunderclap Newman Band was formed. It was an international collection of six musicians of various nationalities and with different musical backgrounds. Under the leadership of Andy Newman, the tribute band set out to celebrate the music of Thunderclap Newman and to honour the legacy of John "Speedy" Keen, Jimmy McCulloch and former members of the band in its heyday.

One of the aims of the band was to perform Hollywood Dream for the first time ever in its entirety, alongside material written by Keen and McCulloch after Thunderclap Newman had gone their separate ways. With two more songwriters, David Buckley and István Etiam, there were plans to add new songs to the existing material.

Despite good press reviews and numerous successful performances, disagreements within the band started to emerge. Andy Newman accepted an offer from Big Country's manager, Ian Grant, to assemble a new band around him and, in March 2010, the Thunderclap Newman Band was disbanded.

The Thunderclap Newman Band was: Andy 'Thunderclap' Newman (UK) – keyboards, soprano sax, clarinet, oboe, David Buckley (US) – vocals, guitar, István Etiam (HU) – rhythm guitar, lap-steel guitar, harmonica & vocals, Stefanos Tsourelis (GR) – lead guitar, Brian Jackson (UK) – bass guitar, Antonio Spano (I) – drums.

In February 2010, Newman performed as Thunderclap Newman at the Con Club in Lewes, Sussex, with a new line-up: Tony Stubbings (bass guitar), Nick Johnson (lead guitar), Mark Brzezicki (former Big Country, drums) and Josh Townshend (nephew of Pete Townshend, on rhythm guitar and vocals). Soon thereafter, the band released a CD entitled Beyond Hollywood, a live album with three studio re-recordings of Thunderclap Newman songs.

Thunderclap Newman supported Big Country on a 2011 tour of the UK. The band played 15 concerts between 2010 and 2012, the last one in June 2012 at the Isle of Wight festival. That was the last time the band performed.

== Death ==
Andy "Thunderclap" Newman died on 30 March 2016, at the age of 73.

== Discography ==
=== Studio album ===
Year	Album details
1970	Hollywood Dream: Label: Track / Polydor (SD 8264); Formats: 1970 LP, 1991 CD

=== Live album ===
Year	Album details
2010	Beyond Hollywood: Label: Track (TRA 1067)

=== Singles ===
Year	Song	Chart peak positions	Album
Year	Song	UK	Album
1969	"Something in the Air" / "Wilhelmina" (non-album track)	1	Hollywood Dream
1970	"Accidents" (single version) / "I See It All" (non-album track)	46	Hollywood Dream
1970	"The Reason" / "Stormy Petrel" (non-album track)	—	Hollywood Dream
1970	"Wild Country" / "Hollywood Dream"	—	Hollywood Dream

== See also ==
- List of artists who reached number one on the UK Singles Chart
- List of performers on Top of the Pops
- UK No.1 Hits of 1969
- List of 1960s one-hit wonders in the United States

== Bibliography ==
- Rice, Tim; Gambaccini, Paul; Rice, Jonathan (1995). The Guinness Book of British Hit Singles: Every Single Hit Since 1952 (10th ed.). Enfield, Middlesex, London: Guinness World Records Ltd. ISBN 0-85112-633-2.
