= Armenia City in the Sky =

1967 song by The Who

Song by the Who

from the album The Who Sell Out
- Released: 15 December 1967
- Recorded: 20 October 1967
- Genre: Psychedelic rock; psychedelia
- Length: 3:48
- Label: Track
- Songwriter: Speedy Keen
- Producer: Kit Lambert

Official audio
- "Armenia City in the Sky" on YouTube

"Armenia City in the Sky" is a song by the English rock band the Who, released on their third studio album The Who Sell Out (1967). It is the only song on the album not written by any members of the band, as it was instead written by Speedy Keen, a friend of the band.

== Background ==
The song was recorded and mixed by 20 October 1967.

John Atkins in the book The Who on Record: A Critical History, 1963–1998 wrote that the song's title is "merely a euphemism for the 'destination' of an acid trip". He also wrote that "the basic hard rock performance is laden with overdubs: backwards guitars, raga drones, feedback and even backward horns. Beneath this dazzling array of effects lies a pleasant but average song in an impossibly high key for Roger Daltrey's voice". Atkins also felt that the song could be taken as a parody of a song by a psychedelic group, "especially when toward the end we can hear chanted 'freak out, freak out' in a silly voice".

Sterling Whitaker of Ultimate Classic Rock wrote that the song "was an innovative sonic production that made use of the Who's instrumental and vocal abilities, along with groundbreaking sound effects that pointed the way to much of the group's later work". Rolling Stone wrote that the song has "orchestrated fuzz". John Dougan thought that because "Armenia City in the Sky" sounded like a Pete Townshend song, it ended up on the album.

== Critical reception ==
Richie Unterberger of AllMusic thought that the song was one of the four highlights on the album. Robert Christgau picked "Armenia City in the Sky" as one of his three favourites from the album. Ultimate Classic Rock ranked it as the band's 37th best song.

== Cover versions ==
American alternative rock band Sugar released a live cover of the song as a B-side to their single "A Good Idea". Petra Haden covered "Armenia City in the Sky" on her a cappella album Petra Haden Sings: The Who Sell Out (2005). AllMusic writer Tim Sendra chose her version as one of the highlights on the album.

American drummer Bun E. Carlos of Cheap Trick released a cover version of the song on his solo studio album Greetings from Bunezuela! in 2016 with the band Candy Golde.

== Personnel ==
Adapted from the liner notes of the 1995 reissue.

The Who

- Roger Daltrey – vocals
- Pete Townshend – guitar, vocals
- John Entwistle – bass, horns
- Keith Moon – drums
