= Something in the Air =

1969 single by Thunderclap Newman

Single by Thunderclap Newman

from the album Hollywood Dream
- B-side: "Wilhelmina"
- Released: 23 May 1969
- Genre: Blues rock; soft rock
- Length: 3:53
- Label: Track
- Songwriter: Speedy Keen
- Producer: Pete Townshend

Thunderclap Newman singles chronology
"Something in the Air" (1969)	"Accidents" (1970)

Official audio
- "Something in the Air" on YouTube

"Something in the Air" is the debut single by British rock band Thunderclap Newman, written by Speedy Keen who also provided lead vocals. It was a No. 1 single for three weeks in the UK Singles Chart in July 1969. The song has been used for films, television and advertisements, and has been covered by several artists. The track was also included on the band's only album release Hollywood Dream, over a year later.

== Background ==
In 1969, Pete Townshend, guitarist with The Who, was the catalyst behind the formation of the band. The concept was to create a band to perform songs written by drummer and singer Speedy Keen, who had written "Armenia City in the Sky", the first track on The Who Sell Out. Townshend recruited jazz pianist Andy "Thunderclap" Newman (a friend from art college), and 15-year-old guitarist Jimmy McCulloch, who later played lead guitar in Paul McCartney and Wings. Keen played the drums and sang the lead.

== Production ==
Townshend produced the single, arranged the strings, and played bass under the pseudonym Bijou Drains. Originally titled "Revolution" but later renamed to avoid confusion with the Beatles' 1968 song of the same name, "Something in the Air" captured post-flower power rebellion, combining McCulloch's acoustic and electric guitars, Keen's drumming and falsetto vocals, and Newman's piano solo.

The song, beginning in E major, has three key changes, its second verse climbing to F♯ major, and, via a roundabout transition, goes down to C major for Newman's barrelhouse piano solo. Following this, the last verse is, like the second, a tone above the previous verse, closing the song in G♯ major.

== Reception ==
The single reached No. 1 in the UK Singles Chart just three weeks after release, holding off Elvis Presley in the process. The scale of the song's success surprised everyone, and there were no plans to promote Thunderclap Newman with live performances. Eventually a line-up—augmented by Jim Pitman-Avory on bass and McCulloch's elder brother Jack on drums—played a handful of gigs.

In the UK, Thunderclap Newman's follow-up single "Accidents" was released in May 1970 and charted at No. 46 for a week. The album Hollywood Dream peaked in Billboard at No. 163.

== Personnel ==
- Andy "Thunderclap" Newman – piano; lead vocals on "Wilhelmina"
- Speedy Keen – double-tracked lead vocal, drums
- Jimmy McCulloch – lead and rhythm guitars
- Pete Townshend – bass guitar (credited to "Bijou Drains"), orchestral arrangement

== Charts ==
Chart (1969)	Peak position
Australia (Kent Music Report)	6
Canada Top Singles (RPM)	26
Netherlands (Single Top 100)	9
New Zealand (Listener)	4
UK Singles (Official Charts)	1
US Billboard Hot 100	37
West Germany (GfK)	13

== Appearances in other media ==
"Something in the Air" by Thunderclap Newman appeared on the soundtracks of several films, such as The Magic Christian (1969), which helped the single reach No. 37 in the United States and "The Strawberry Statement" (1970) (source: www.allmusic.com). It later appeared in Kingpin (1996), Almost Famous (2000), The Dish (2000), The Girl Next Door (2004) and The Instigators (2024).

"Something in the Air" has been used extensively in television, including on an advertisement for British Airways which featured PJ O'Rourke. The song also appeared in a TV advert for the Austin Mini in the early 1990s, featuring 1960s fashion model Twiggy. In 2006, a version of the song by Hayley Sanderson was used in advertisements for the mobile phone service provider TalkTalk, and as the introduction theme to the 2024 British Touring Car Championship final event at Brands Hatch. It also appeared several times on the TV series Heartbeat.

== Tom Petty and the Heartbreakers version ==
"Something in the Air"

Single by Tom Petty and the Heartbreakers

from the album Greatest Hits
- B-side: "The Waiting"
- Released: October 18, 1993
- Length: 3:17
- Label: MCA
- Songwriter: Speedy Keen
- Producer: Rick Rubin

Tom Petty and the Heartbreakers singles chronology
"Peace in L.A." (1992)	"Something in the Air" (1993)	"Mary Jane's Last Dance" (1993)

A cover of "Something in the Air" was recorded by Tom Petty and the Heartbreakers and included on their Greatest Hits album, released in 1993. A live version of the song was included in The Live Anthology, released in 2009.

=== Charts ===
Chart (1993–1994)	Peak position
Canada Top Singles (RPM)	26
UK Singles (Official Charts)	53
US Album Rock Tracks (Billboard)	19

=== Release history ===
Region	Date	Format(s)	Label(s)	Ref.
United Kingdom	18 October 1994	7-inch vinyl; CD; cassette	MCA	
Australia	11 April 1994	CD; cassette	MCA	

== See also ==
- List of 1960s one-hit wonders in the United States
