= The Who Sell Out =

1967 album by the Who

Studio album by the Who
- Released: 15 December 1967
- Recorded: May–November 1967
- Studios: IBC, Pye, De Lane Lea Studios and CBS, London; Talentmasters and Mirasound, New York City; Bradley's Barn, Nashville; Gold Star, Los Angeles
- Genres: Art pop; power pop; psychedelic pop; mod pop
- Length: 39:22
- Labels: Track (UK); Decca (US)
- Producers: Kit Lambert; Chris Stamp

The Who UK chronology
A Quick One (1966)	The Who Sell Out (1967)	Direct Hits (1968)

The Who US chronology
Happy Jack (1967)	The Who Sell Out (1967)	Magic Bus: The Who on Tour (1968)

Singles from The Who Sell Out
- 1. "I Can See for Miles" Released: October 1967; 2. "Mary Anne with the Shaky Hand" Released: 2 February 1968 (Netherlands)

The Who Sell Out is the third studio album by the English rock band the Who. It was released on 15 December 1967 by Track Records in the UK and Decca Records in the US. A concept album, The Who Sell Out is structured as a collection of unrelated songs interspersed with fake commercials and public service announcements, including the second track "Heinz Baked Beans". The album purports to be a broadcast by pirate radio station Radio London. The reference to "selling out" was an intended irony, as the Who had been making real commercials during that period of their career, some of which are included as bonus tracks on the remastered CD.

The album was primarily written by guitarist Pete Townshend, though three tracks were penned by bassist John Entwistle and one by Speedy Keen. Al Kooper makes a guest appearance on two tracks. The album was produced by the band's manager Kit Lambert.

The album's release was reportedly followed by lawsuits due to the mention of real-world commercial interests in the faux commercials and on the album covers, and by the makers of the real jingles (Radio London jingles), who claimed the Who used them without permission (the jingles were produced by PAMS Productions of Dallas, Texas, which created thousands of station identification jingles in the 1960s and 1970s). The deodorant company Odorono took offence that Chris Stamp made a request for endorsement dollars. "I Can See for Miles" was the only song from the album released as a single and peaked at number 10 in the UK and number 9 in the US, becoming the band's highest-charting single and only Top 10 hit in the latter region.

The Who Sell Out has received widespread acclaim from critics, some of whom viewed it as the Who's best record. It has also frequently been featured on all-time lists of the best albums, including Rolling Stone magazine's "The 500 Greatest Albums of All Time". However, it was the band's lowest-charting album on the UK Albums Chart, where it peaked at number 13.

== Background ==
Initially, the band's follow-up to A Quick One was to be titled Who's Lily after their recent single "Pictures of Lily". Early cuts, such as a cover of "Summertime Blues", the Coke jingles, and the instrumental "Sodding About", showed the influence of Track Records label-mate Jimi Hendrix on Townshend's guitar playing.

Even before the group had formed, the members of the Who had been profoundly influenced by rock 'n' roll appearing on the radio. The BBC did not broadcast much contemporary music at the time, which was left to stations like Radio Luxembourg and then-pirate radio stations such as Radio Caroline, Radio Scotland and Wonderful Radio London. By the end of 1966, the Who had achieved commercial success owing to the mod movement that made up a significant section of the group's early audience. However, the movement was fading, and the TV show Ready, Steady, Go that had boosted the group to fame had been cancelled. The group started touring the US the following year, and started to achieve success with their live act.

In summer 1967, the group's managers Kit Lambert and Chris Stamp suggested the band could create a concept album based on pirate radio and structure it in the same manner as that, or a typical US AM radio station. As pirate radio had been influential to mods, it was felt particularly appropriate to pay tribute to it. As well as the music, the inter-song announcements and jingles were a key component of radio, so it was decided to include a selection of humorous asides on the album. In his book Maximum R & B, Who confidant Richard Barnes claims he came up with the idea of the band recording commercial jingles after their cover version of the Batman theme appeared on the Ready Steady Who EP. Barnes posited the idea to Roger Daltrey, whose similar suggestions to Pete Townshend were allegedly met initially with derision. However, Townshend later claimed in his memoir that he came up with the concept for the album.

The Marine, &c., Broadcasting (Offences) Act 1967 came into effect at midnight on 14 August 1967, outlawing all pirate stations (except for Radio Caroline North and South) and strengthening the album's effect as a tribute. The aspect separated the Who from their contemporaries in the developing underground rock scene, both musically and stylistically.

== Writing and recording ==
According to music critic Richie Unterberger, The Who Sell Out featured "jubilant" psychedelic pop music that veers between "melodic mod pop and powerful instrumentation", while Edna Gundersen from USA Today said the album's style was power pop.

On 24 April 1967 (three weeks after recording "Pictures of Lily") the band entered De Lane Lea Studios in London to cut several songs meant for a projected instrumental EP, including a cover of "In the Hall of the Mountain King" and "Instrumental No-Title", the working title for a song renamed "Sodding About" when both tracks appeared as bonus tracks on CD reissues of the album. Two commercials for Coca-Cola, "Coke after Coke" and "Things Go Better With Coke", were also recorded when the sessions concluded on 28 April.

The EP was soon abandoned and sessions for their next album began in earnest from 8-16 May at CBS in London with the outtakes "Girl's Eyes" (penned by Moon) and "Early Morning Cold Taxi" (co-written by Daltrey). On 24-29 May they returned to De Lane Lea to tape a version of the live staple "Summertime Blues", earmarked as a possible single, and a backing track for the Entwistle B-side "Someone's Coming", along with the recording of backing tracks for "Armenia City in the Sky" and "I Can See for Miles". "Armenia City in the Sky" was written by a friend of the band, Speedy Keen, (Note: Keen later found fame as a member of Thunderclap Newman whose smash hit "Something in the Air" features production by Pete Townshend and bass playing from Townshend under the pseudonym Bijou Drains.) while "I Can See For Miles" had been demoed by Townshend in 1966 but saved for a time he thought the group would need a big hit.

After a brief trip to America which included a notable appearance at the Monterey International Pop Festival, they entered De Lane Lea from 1-4 July to tape early versions of "I Can't Reach You", "Relax" and "Rael", with Kit Lambert making mono mixes of them on the 5th. A return to America included a stop at Talent Masters Studios in New York from 10-12 July to finish the multi-sectional mini-opera "Rael". After initially recording a satisfactory version of the song, the multi-track tape was accidentally thrown in the trash by a janitor, rendering the intro unusable; when Townshend was informed of the situation, he allegedly threw a chair through the glass in the control room. Nonetheless, engineer Chris Huston was able to save the take by patching the mono version in to replace the damaged section, which is why the intro and first line of the stereo version are in mono; this version was ultimately chosen for the album over an October remake. Both Talent Masters and Mirasound were used from 6-7 August where the US single version of "Mary Anne with the Shaky Hand" (featuring Al Kooper on organ), "Our Love Was", another attempt at "Summertime Blues" (which would remain an outtake) and overdubs to "I Can See For Miles" (lead vocals) and "Relax" (organ) were laid down. At this time, Townshend began to question some of Lambert's technical decisions in the studio, feeling their records did not sound clean enough. On 15 August they stopped at Bradley's Barn Studio in Nashville to add horn overdubs to "Someone's Coming" and vocals to "Our Love Was" and "Relax". On 5 September, Lambert took the four-track tapes of "I Can See For Miles" and "Rael" to Gold Star Studios in Los Angeles to utilize its famous echo chamber.

When the group returned from America in late September, Chris Stamp approached Townshend with a proposed track list for the new LP using the songs that had been recorded to that point. Townshend objected, as the group had been slowly stockpiling an eclectic collection of songs and hadn't seriously considered turning them into an album yet. He asked Stamp for more time to fashion an album and it is at this point that the idea of connecting the songs with a pirate radio theme, including commercials, was considered. Townshend himself claims to have come up with the idea in his memoir, although Richard Barnes and Kit Lambert have also claimed credit.

Once the decision was made, the group spent 11 October at De Lane Lea recording several commercials for the concept including "Odorono", "Heinz Baked Beans", "John Mason Cars", "Bag O'Nails", "Rotosound Strings", "Medac" and the song "Silas Stingy". Entwistle had penned "Heinz Baked Beans", "Medac" and "Silas Stingy", while he and Moon came up with most of the short ad interludes like "John Mason" and "Rotosound Strings". The next day, "Tattoo" and "Glittering Girl" (first attempted at sessions for "Pictures of Lily" back in early April and considered a possible single, though ultimately left an outtake) were recorded. "Tattoo" had been penned by Townshend in Las Vegas just before the trip back to England, concerning the outraged reaction the group received by reactionaries in the deep South who questioned their masculinity. On 20 October "Jaguar" and a rejected remake of "Rael" were attempted at IBC along with lead vocals for "Armenia City In The Sky", finishing the song. With time running out to complete the album, 24 October was spent at De Lane Lea finishing the rest of the commercial interludes including "Premier Drums", "Speakeasy", "Charles Atlas" and "Track Records" along with an acoustic remake of "Mary Anne With the Shaky Hand" which would find its way on the album. On the 26th, a new mono master prepared for "Rael" chopped off the final portion of the track, which would not first see release until it appeared as "Rael 2" on the Thirty Years of Maximum R&B box set. Finally, an old Townshend ballad named "Sunrise" written for his mother, originally demoed with different lyrics in 1965 was taped at IBC on 2 November, although Moon did not want it on the album. With the addition of "Sunrise", it was decided to leave "Jaguar" as an outtake and the sessions were complete.

The album was mixed by Lambert and Damon Lyon-Shaw intermittently throughout November, coming up with a finished master at IBC on 20 November. While the concept of the album with its song-commercials and mock jingles is maintained through the first side, it disappears midway through the second side after "Medac", although the band had recorded many other jingles they could have used to complete the side. The album was scheduled for release on 17 November until Odorono deodorant threatened to sue over their image on the album's cover art, prompting Stamp to negotiate with all four products seen on the front and back covers to ensure their permission for use.

== Packaging ==
The cover is divided into panels featuring a photograph by David Montgomery of each of the band members, two on the front and two on the back. On the front is Pete Townshend applying Odorono brand deodorant from an oversized stick, and Roger Daltrey sitting in a bathtub full of Heinz Baked Beans (holding an oversized tin can of the same). Daltrey variously claimed that he had either caught pneumonia, the flu, or "the worst cold that [he had] had in [his] lifetime" after sitting for a prolonged period in the bathtub, as the beans had just come out of the fridge, and were "freezing cold". On the back is Keith Moon applying Medac (an acne ointment) from an oversized tube to an oversized pimple, and John Entwistle in a leopard-skin Tarzan suit, squeezing a blonde model, Jill Langham, in a leopard-skin bikini with one arm and a teddy bear with the other (an ad for the Charles Atlas exercise course mentioned in one of the album's fake commercials).

Original vinyl copies of Sell Out end with an audio oddity that repeats into a locked groove (In response to the Beatles' Sgt. Pepper's Lonely Hearts Club Band). The music in the locked groove is a snippet of what was originally intended to be a vocal jingle for the Who's UK label Track Records.

When the LP was released on Track Records in the UK in 1967, a psychedelic poster illustrated by Adrian George was included inside the first 1000 copies (500 stereo and 500 mono). They came with a sticker on the front cover stating 'Free Psychedelic Poster Inside'. Because of their rarity, first pressings with poster and sticker have sold for more than £600 (about $820). The 20-by-30-inch (50 by 75 cm) poster was reinstated into the vinyl packaging when the Who's back catalogue of studio albums was restored to vinyl in 2012.

== Release and reception ==
Professional ratings
Retrospective professional ratings
Aggregate scores
Source	Rating
Metacritic	96/100 (super deluxe)
Review scores
Source	Rating
AllMusic	5/5 stars
Encyclopedia of Popular Music	4/5 stars
Mojo	4/5 stars
NME	9/10
Pitchfork	8.5/10
Q	4/5 stars
Rolling Stone	4.5/5 stars
The Rolling Stone Album Guide	5/5 stars
Uncut	5/5
The Village Voice	A+

The album was released in the UK on 15 December 1967 (Track 612 002 Mono & Track 613 002 Stereo). It reached number 13 in the charts. The original release date of 17 November had been pushed back due to arguments about the running order. It was released almost concurrently in the US, reaching number 48 on Billboard although it peaked at number 21 on Cashbox and as high as number 17 on Record World. The concept of the album hampered its commercial performance despite positive reviews, as its irony sat awkwardly with the serious ambitions of the underground music scene, and it was too specific to the mod scene's background for many younger pop fans.

In a contemporary review for Rolling Stone, Jann Wenner called The Who Sell Out "fantastic" and praised its "exquisite" sense of humor and the Who's "consummate" musicianship, which includes "wholly original" instrumentation and cleverly placed electronic sounds. Robert Christgau, writing in Esquire, said the album establishes the band as "the third best not just in Britain but the world", while citing "Tattoo" as the best song Townshend has "ever written, worth the price of the album". He later included the album in his "basic record library" of 1960s albums, published in Christgau's Record Guide: Rock Albums of the Seventies (1981). Over in England, Melody Maker enthused that it's "an iron-backed album of strong and refreshing Pete Townshend compositions", concluding that it "easily surpasses anything the Who have done before."

In a retrospective review for AllMusic, Richie Unterberger said that, "on strictly musical merits, it's a terrific set of songs that ultimately stands as one of the group's greatest achievements." Sociomusicologist Simon Frith referred to it as a "Pop art pop masterpiece".

In 1995, The Who Sell Out was reissued by MCA Records with numerous outtakes and rejected jingles added to the end of the original album. In the liner notes for the reissue, Dave Marsh called it "the greatest rock and roll album of its era" and "the Who's consummate masterpiece, the work that holds together most tightly as concept and realization". Marsh believed the album's essence is "most tightly linked to the glorious pop insanity that psychedelia and its aftermath destroyed forever." Reviewing the reissue in The Village Voice, Christgau called it the Who's "only great album", feeling they had yet to "take their pretensions seriously", with nothing but good songs throughout, including the faux-ads and bonus tracks. It was also deemed the band's best work by Todd Hutlock from Stylus Magazine, while Melody Maker said the record was a masterpiece because of its "glorious celebration of pop as useless commodity and a commercially corrupted art form" without degrading itself. Rolling Stone called it "the most successful concept album ever" in a 1999 review.

In 2003, The Who Sell Out was placed at number 113 on Rolling Stone's list of the 500 greatest albums of all time, 115 in a 2012 revised list, and 316 on the 2020 list. Mark Kemp, writing in The Rolling Stone Album Guide (2004), called it Townshend's first and best concept album and said that he "successfully does what he would overdo" in Tommy and Quadrophenia: "There's no fixed narrative to take away from the music. And the music is sensational". In 2007, Rolling Stone included it on their list of the 40 essential albums of 1967 and stated, "the Who's finest album exemplifies how pop this famously psychedelic year was." The album was reissued in 2009 as a two-disc deluxe edition, which Danny Kelly of Uncut magazine said was the "definitive" release of the Who's most "entertaining" and "endearing" album. In his review for eMusic, Lenny Kaye said that The Who Sell Out is a "classic of prophetic pop art" because of "the concept of branding that has taken the place of record label patronage these days".

On 23 April 2021, the album was re-released as a new Super Deluxe Edition Set, designed by Richard Evans, featuring 112 tracks on five CDs: "The Original Mono Album", "The Original Stereo Album", "Pete Townshend's Demos", "The Who's Studio Sessions", and "The Road to Tommy", including 48 previously unreleased tracks, two 7" singles, posters, memorabilia, and new liner notes by Townshend.

== Track listing ==
=== Original release ===
All songs written by Pete Townshend, except where noted.

Side one
No.	Title	Writer(s)	Lead vocals	Length
1.	"Armenia City in the Sky"	Speedy Keen	Daltrey and Townshend	3:48
2.	"Heinz Baked Beans"	John Entwistle	Moon, Entwistle and Townshend	1:00
3.	"Mary Anne with the Shaky Hand"		Daltrey and Townshend	2:28
4.	"Odorono"		Townshend	2:34
5.	"Tattoo"		Daltrey, with Townshend	2:51
6.	"Our Love Was" ( (Note: Track 6 titled "Our Love Was, Is" on original US LPs, and contains a unique guitar solo in both its stereo and mono mix.))		Townshend	3:23
7.	"I Can See for Miles"		Daltrey	4:05
Total length:				20:09

Side two
No.	Title	Writer(s)	Lead vocals	Length
1.	"I Can't Reach You" ( (Note: Track 1 titled "Can't Reach You" on various reissues))		Townshend	3:31
2.	"Medac" ( (Note: Track 2 titled "Spotted Henry" on original US LPs.))	Entwistle	Entwistle	0:57
3.	"Relax"		Daltrey and Townshend	2:41
4.	"Silas Stingy"	Entwistle	Entwistle and Daltrey	3:07
5.	"Sunrise"		Townshend	3:06
6.	"Rael (1 and 2)" (includes hidden track (Note: On original vinyl pressings by Track Records and Decca Records, there is a hidden track immediately after Rael Pt 2 known as "Track Records Run Out Groove", a looping recording of the spoken words "Track Records". This hidden track is included as a distinct track on digital reissues.))		Daltrey	5:51
Total length:				19:13

Notes

1995 CD bonus tracks
No.	Title	Writer(s)	Lead vocals	Length
14.	"Rael 2"		Townshend	0:47
15.	"Glittering Girl"		Townshend, with Entwistle	2:56
16.	"Melancholia"		Daltrey	3:17
17.	"Someone's Coming"	Entwistle	Daltrey	2:29
18.	"Jaguar"		Moon, with Townshend	2:51
19.	"Early Morning Cold Taxi"	Roger Daltrey, Dave Langston	Daltrey	2:55
20.	"In the Hall of the Mountain King"	Edvard Grieg	Instrumental (with vocalizations from the band)	4:19
21.	"Girl's Eyes"	Keith Moon	Moon and Entwistle	3:28
22.	"Mary Anne with the Shaky Hand" (Alternative version)		Daltrey and Townshend	3:19
23.	"Glow Girl"		Daltrey and Townshend	2:24
Total length:				28:45

=== 2009 deluxe edition ===
This edition contains the original album in stereo on disc one, the mono mix on disc two, and bonus tracks on both discs.

Disc one bonus tracks
No.	Title	Writer(s)	Length
14.	"Rael Naive"		0:59
15.	"Someone's Coming"	Entwistle	2:36
16.	"Early Morning Cold Taxi"	Daltrey, Langston	2:59
17.	"Jaguar"		2:58
18.	"Coke After Coke"		1:05
19.	"Glittering Girl"		3:00
20.	"Summertime Blues"	Eddie Cochran, Jerry Capehart	2:35
21.	"John Mason Cars"	Keith Moon, John Entwistle	0:40
22.	"Girl's Eyes"	Moon	2:52
23.	"Sodding About"	Entwistle, Moon, Townshend	2:47
24.	"Premier Drums" (Full Version)	Moon	0:43
25.	"Odorono" (Final Chorus)		0:24
26.	"Mary Anne with the Shaky Hand" (US Mirasound Version)		3:22
27.	"Things Go Better with Coke"		0:30
28.	"In the Hall of the Mountain King"	Grieg; arranged by the Who	4:23
29.	"Top Gear"		0:52
30.	"Rael (1 & 2)" (Remake Version)		6:35
Total length:			39:20

Disc two bonus tracks
No.	Title	Writer(s)	Length
14.	"Mary Anne with the Shaky Hand" (Version 1; US mono single mix)		3:16
15.	"Someone's Coming" (UK single mono mix)	Entwistle	2:31
16.	"Relax" (Early demo, stereo)		3:21
17.	"Jaguar" (Original mono mix)		2:51
18.	"Glittering Girl" (Unreleased version, stereo)		3:17
19.	"Tattoo" (Early mono mix)		2:46
20.	"Our Love Was" (Take 12, unused mono mix)		3:16
21.	"Rotosound Strings" (With final note, stereo)	Entwistle, Moon	0:12
22.	"I Can See for Miles" (Early mono mix)		4:00
23.	"Rael" (Early mono mix)		5:46
24.	"Armenia City in the Sky" (Isolated backwards track (Hidden track))	Keen	3:15
25.	"Great Shakes" (Unreleased US radio commercial; (Hidden track))		1:01
Total length:			35:32

== Personnel ==
Adapted from the liner notes of the 1995 reissue.

The Who

- Roger Daltrey – lead and backing vocals
- Pete Townshend – acoustic and electric guitars, backing vocals, lead vocals ("Odorono", "Our Love Was", "I Can't Reach You", "Sunrise", "Rael Naive", "Jaguar", "Glittering Girl"), piano
- John Entwistle – bass guitar, horns ("Someone's Coming", "Top Gear", "Heinz Baked Beans", "In the Hall of the Mountain King"), backing vocals, lead vocals ("Medac", "Silas Stingy", "Summertime Blues", "John Mason Cars")
- Keith Moon – drums, lead vocals ("Girl's Eyes", "John Mason Cars", "Jaguar")

Additional musicians

- Al Kooper – organ ("Rael 1", "Mary Anne with the Shaky Hand (electric version)")

Personnel

- Kit Lambert – producer, engineer
- Damon Lyon-Shaw – engineer
- Jon Astley and Andy Macpherson – engineers (1995 remaster)
- David Montgomery – cover photography
- Jill Langham – cover model
- David King and Roger Law – sleeve design
- Adrian George – psychedelic poster design
- Richard Evans – 1995 and 2009 reissues, 2021 Super Deluxe Edition design and art direction

== Charts ==
1967–1968 weekly chart performance for The Who Sell Out
Chart (1967–1968)	Peak position
Australian Albums (Kent Music Report)	8
UK Albums (Official Charts)	13
US Billboard 200	48

2021 weekly chart performance for The Who Sell Out
Chart (2021)	Peak position
Austrian Albums (Ö3 Austria)	34
Belgian Albums (Ultratop Flanders)	51
Belgian Albums (Ultratop Wallonia)	97
Dutch Albums (Album Top 100)	77
French Albums (SNEP)	120
German Albums (Offizielle Top 100)	19
Spanish Albums (Promusicae)	94
Swiss Albums (Schweizer Hitparade)	26

== Certifications ==
Certifications for The Who Sell Out
Region	Certification	Certified units/sales
United Kingdom (BPI) 2009 deluxe edition	Silver	60,000^{^}
^{^} Shipments figures based on certification alone.

== See also ==
- Album era
- FM!, a 2018 album by Vince Staples also using broadcast radio as a conceptual framework
- Petra Haden Sings: The Who Sell Out
