= Speedy Keen =

English musician (1945–2002)

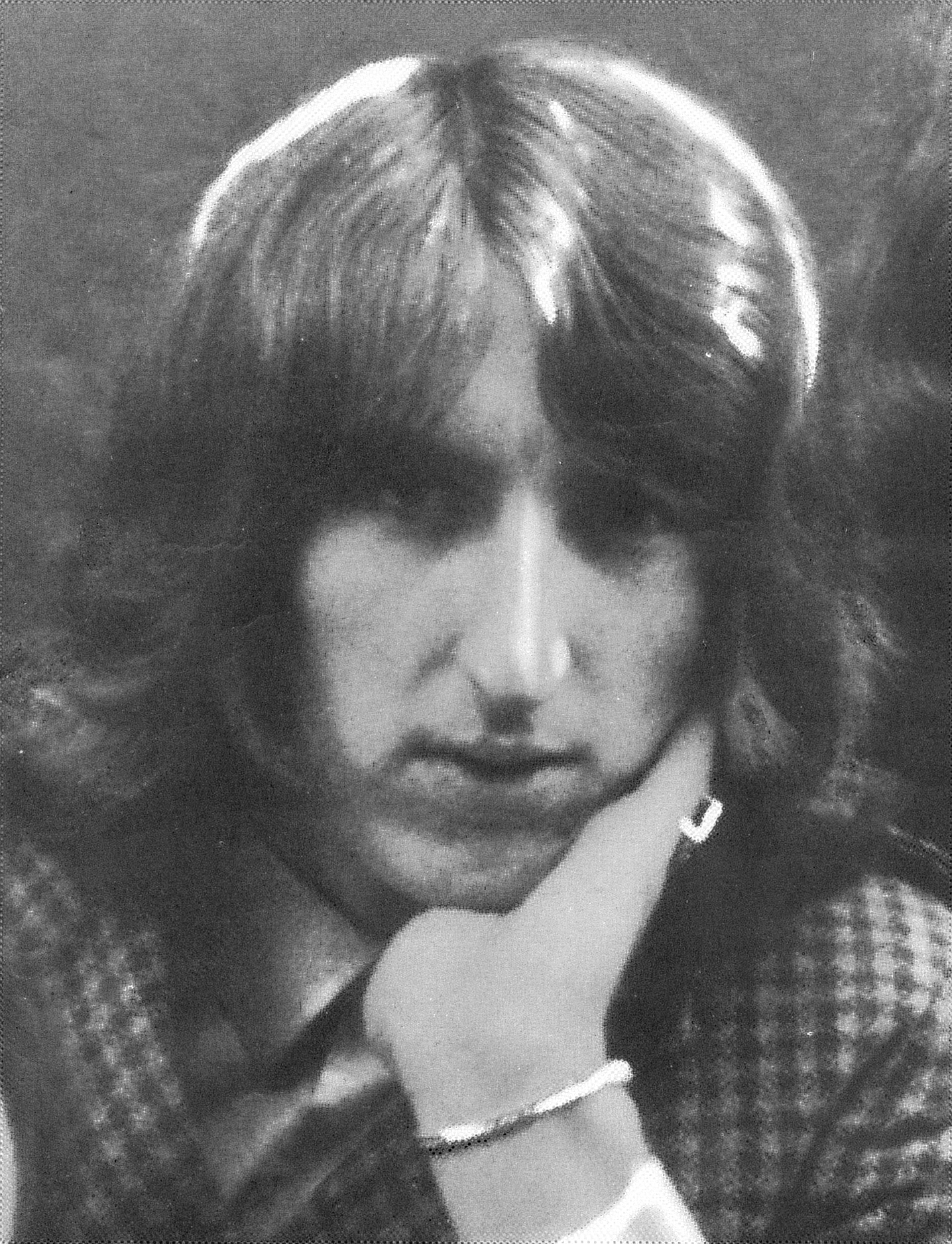

Background information
- Born: John David Percy Keen; 29 March 1945; Ealing, London, England
- Died: 12 March 2002 (aged 56)
- Genre: Rock
- Occupations: Musician; songwriter; producer
- Instruments: Vocals; drums; guitar; Hammond organ; keyboards
- Years active: 1966–2002
- Labels: Track; Island; Roadrunner; Cleopatra
- Formerly of: Thunderclap Newman

John David Percy "Speedy" Keen (29 March 1945 – 12 March 2002) was an English musician, songwriter and producer, best known for being the singer and drummer of the rock band Thunderclap Newman. He wrote "Something in the Air" (1969) for the band, which reached No. 1 in the UK singles chart. He also released two solo albums.

== Career ==
Keen was born in Ealing, London, England. He played early on with such bands as The Krewsaders, The Second Thoughts (1964–65, with Patrick Campbell-Lyons and Chris Thomas) and The Eccentrics. Keen's first recorded song was "Club of Lights", recorded in 1966 for Reaction Records by Oscar (Paul Nicholas).

Before joining Thunderclap Newman, Keen shared a flat with and worked as a driver for Pete Townshend of The Who. He wrote "Armenia City in the Sky", which was included on the album The Who Sell Out (1967). This was the only song The Who ever performed that was specifically written for the group by a non-member. Who bassist Entwistle joked that people thought it was "I'm an Ear Sitting in the Sky". Keen wrote "Something in the Air", his best-known song, for Thunderclap Newman and recorded two solo albums for Track and Island both of which have been released on CD by Esoteric (Cherry Red). "I Promise You" from the second album was used in the American TV series, The Big C.

Keen was later a record producer. His credits included the eponymous first album for Motörhead, and the proto-punk classic L.A.M.F. for The Heartbreakers

== Death ==
Keen died of heart failure on 12 March 2002, aged 56.

== Discography ==
=== Albums ===
- Previous Convictions (1973, Track Records)
- Y' Know Wot I Mean? (1975, Island Records)
