= I Can See for Miles =

1967 song by the Who

- Norwegian picture sleeve

Single by the Who

from the album The Who Sell Out
- B-side: "Someone's Coming" (UK); "Mary Anne with the Shaky Hand" (US)
- Released: 18 September 1967 (US); 13 October 1967 (UK)
- Recorded: May & 6–7 August 1967; 10 September 1967
- Studio: CBS, London; Gold Star, Los Angeles; Talentmasters, New York City
- Genre: Psychedelic rock; power pop; hard rock; psychedelia
- Length: 4:25 (album version); 4:05 (single version)
- Label: Track (UK); Decca (US)
- Songwriter: Pete Townshend
- Producer: Kit Lambert

The Who UK singles chronology
"The Last Time" (1967)	"I Can See for Miles" (1967)	"Dogs" (1968)

The Who US singles chronology
"Pictures of Lily" (1967)	"I Can See for Miles" (1967)	"Call Me Lightning" (1968)

"I Can See for Miles" is a song by the English rock band the Who, recorded for the band's 1967 album The Who Sell Out. Written by guitarist Pete Townshend, it was the only song from the album to be released as a single.

== Composition ==
"I Can See For Miles" was first written and demoed in the spring of 1966, around the time of Shel Talmy's legal case against the Who; Townshend claims to have first written the lyric on the back of his affidavit in the case, with lyrics inspired by the jealousy he felt toward his girlfriend Karen when he saw her with other men. Townshend was so excited by the demo, which he considered his best song up to that point, that he decided to save it for a time when the group would really need a smash hit. He called it his "ace in the hole" which would "flatten all the opposition". The Who released other singles in its stead until it came time to record their third album in the spring of 1967.

== Recording ==
"I Can See for Miles" was recorded in several separate sessions in studios across two continents. The backing tracks were recorded in late May 1967 at CBS Studios in London, while vocals and other overdubs were captured at Talent Masters Studios in New York on 6–7 August. On 10 September, producer Kit Lambert took the four-track tapes to Gold Star Studios in Los Angeles for mixing and mastering, in order to take advantage of that studio's vaunted echo chamber. The initial UK mono pressing (Track Records) and the US Decca single have an overdubbed second bass line mixed upfront, whilst the drums are mixed slightly lower.

== Release ==
The single was released on 18 September in the US and 13 October in the UK. Townshend, who thought the song was a surefire number one, was crushed when it peaked at number 10 in the UK charts, their worst chart position since their debut. "To me it was the ultimate Who record, yet it didn't sell. I spat on the British record buyer", he later commented. However, the single's prospects in America were helped by a memorable appearance on The Smothers Brothers Comedy Hour, when Keith Moon detonated an explosive at the close of their performance of "My Generation". That, plus the heavy touring the group had done in the country all summer (including a prestige appearance at the Monterey International Pop Festival), pushed the song to number 9 on the Billboard Hot 100 (number 8 on Cashbox), which remains their highest US chart position to date. In Canada, it reached number 4.On the New Zealand Listener charts it reached number 13.

== Critical reception ==
The song is ranked number 40 on Dave Marsh's "The 1001 Greatest Singles Ever Made", number 37 on NME's "The Top 100 Singles of All-Time", and number 162 on Pitchfork's "The 200 Greatest Songs of the 1960s." Billboard described the single as a "compelling off-beat number full of excitement and drive", stating that a "strong dance beat supports smooth vocal blend with top production work". Cash Box said that it's a "solid, thumping, hard-driving, discotheque-styled rock stand" that's "a real powerhouse". In a review for AllMusic, Richie Unterberger called "I Can See for Miles" "one of the greatest Who songs", adding that it also features "one of Keith Moon's greatest performances" and "one of the best drum parts ever on a rock record".

It was ranked number 262 on Rolling Stone's 500 Greatest Songs of All Time list in 2010. In 2012, Paste ranked the song number four on their list of the 20 greatest Who songs, and in 2022, Rolling Stone ranked the song number two on their list of the 50 greatest Who songs, behind only "Won't Get Fooled Again".

== Personnel ==
- Roger Daltrey – vocals
- Pete Townshend – backing vocals, guitar
- John Entwistle – backing vocals, bass
- Keith Moon – drums

== Legacy ==
The song may have inspired the Beatles' "Helter Skelter". Paul McCartney was inspired to write "Helter Skelter" after reading an interview with the Who's Pete Townshend in which he described the song as the loudest, rawest, dirtiest song the Who had ever recorded. McCartney said he then wrote "Helter Skelter" to have "the most raucous vocal, the loudest drums".
