= Pictures of Lily =

- West German picture sleeve

Single by the Who
- B-side: "Doctor, Doctor"
- Released: 21 April 1967
- Recorded: 5 April 1967
- Studio: IBC (London)
- Genre: Power pop
- Length: 2:44
- Label: Track (UK); Decca (US)
- Songwriter: Pete Townshend
- Producer: Kit Lambert

The Who singles chronology
"Happy Jack" (1966)	"Pictures of Lily" (1967)	"The Last Time" (1967)

"Pictures of Lily" is a song by the English rock band the Who. Written by guitarist Pete Townshend, it was released as a single in April 1967, reaching no. 4 on the UK Singles Chart.

Townshend coined the term "power pop" when he used it to describe the song in a May 1967 interview with NME.

The song was included in the 1971 Who singles collection Meaty Beaty Big and Bouncy and has appeared on a number of the band's other compilation albums.

== Synopsis ==
In the beginning of the song, the narrator laments his inability to sleep. When his father gives him the pictures of the song's titular Lily, he feels better, and is able to sleep. Soon, he feels desire for Lily as a person instead of a photo, and asks his father for an introduction. His father informs him however that "Lily" has, in fact, been dead since 1929. Initially, the singer laments, but before long turns back to his fantasy.

== Meaning and origin ==
According to Pete Townshend in the 2006 book Lyrics by Rikky Rooksby, "the idea was inspired by a picture my girlfriend had on her wall of an old Vaudeville star – Lily Bayliss. It was an old 1920s postcard and someone had written on it 'Here's another picture of Lily – hope you haven't got this one.' It made me think that everyone has a pin-up period."

However, in his 2012 memoir Who I Am, Townshend mentioned Lillie Langtry, the music hall star and mistress of Edward VII, as the inspiration for the tune. She died in the year 1929 as mentioned in the lyrics of the tune.

Townshend's statement is unlikely to refer to Lilian Baylis (who was a theatre manager and producer, not a performer), who died in 1937.

Mark Wilkerson quotes Townshend as writing that the song is "Merely a ditty about masturbation and the importance of it to a young man." However, the song does not mention masturbation explicitly.

== Recording ==
During the period that the song was recorded, in 1967, Kit Lambert, the band's first "real" manager, according to Townshend, mixed the song. He filmed the band recording the song, showing the four bandmates performing, with Keith Moon being recruited for the high notes in the song (even though Pete Townshend can be heard telling Keith he "keeps jumping on John's part", however, other live video footage shows John Entwistle, the band's bassist, harmonising and playing the French Horn. Daltrey has said the French horn solo was an attempt to emulate a World War I klaxon warning siren, as the Lily girl was a World War I-era pinup.

== Reception ==
Cash Box called it "a groovy, rhythmic rock stand that should have no trouble getting plenty of action."

The song was covered by David Bowie for the 2001 Who tribute album Substitute, and later included on the box set Brilliant Adventure.

== Chart performance ==
"Pictures of Lily" was released in 1967 as a single, and made the top five in the UK, peaking at number four. Outside the UK, the song failed to break into the top 50 in the United States, peaking at number fifty-one. It was, however, a stronger performer in Continental Europe, where it made number 5 in Germany and the Netherlands, number 9 in Austria, number 12 in Flemish-speaking Belgium and number 6 in French-speaking Belgium.

== Charts ==
Chart (1967)	Peak position
Austria (Ö3 Austria Top 40)	9
Belgium (Ultratop 50 Flanders)	12
Belgium (Ultratop 50 Wallonia)	6
Netherlands (Dutch Top 40)	5
New Zealand (Listener)	14
UK Singles (OCC)	4
US Billboard Hot 100	51
West Germany (Media Control)	5

== Live performances ==
This song was first played live in 1966, and they continued to play through whilst touring until 1968. It returned to make a one-off appearance at a show in Passaic, New Jersey on 11 September 1979, where singer Daltrey forgot the lyrics and they went straight to Free's "All Right Now", which the band performed on rare occasions in the 1970s. Daltrey performed this four times in his 1985 solo tour. The Who returned it to their set list in 1989, and Daltrey performed it during his 2009 Use It or Lose It solo tour. The song was also performed during the Who's 2015 The Who Hits 50! tour.
