= Track Records =

British record company

Track Record
- Founded: 1966; 60 years ago
- Founder: Kit Lambert, Chris Stamp
- Distributors: Polydor Records (UK); Atlantic Records (US); Decca Records (US); MCA Records (US)
- Genre: Rock, hard rock, psychedelic rock, blues rock
- Country of origin: United Kingdom
- Location: London

Track Record (a.k.a. Track Records) was founded in 1966 in London by Kit Lambert and Chris Stamp, then managers of the rock group the Who. It was one of the first British-owned independent record labels in the United Kingdom. The most successful artists whose work appeared on the Track label were the Jimi Hendrix Experience, the Who, the Crazy World of Arthur Brown, Thunderclap Newman and Golden Earring. The label ceased operations in 1978 but was revived in 1999.

== Background ==
Track was originally intended to provide more creative freedom for the Who, but according to Stamp, at the end of 1966, he and Lambert were spurred to set up Track in order to get involved with new arrival from the United States, Jimi Hendrix. Even though Hendrix was not in need of management (as he had already signed an agreement with Chas Chandler) he was in need of a UK label.

Lambert and Stamp had already grappled with the rigid confines of the established record companies. In 1966, they were involved in a court battle to release the Who from an onerous contract with producer Shel Talmy and the Decca Records (US) and Brunswick (UK) labels. At this time, Lambert and Stamp started releasing the Who's records in the United Kingdom on Robert Stigwood's Reaction Records label. Both Track and Reaction were very much reliant upon distribution support in the United Kingdom from the large Polydor Records label based in Germany. Polydor's involvement with these two small labels can be seen as its learning process about the rock music market. Polydor was interested in expanding its base beyond easy listening and ballads. Its best known artist at the time was Bert Kaempfert.

== History ==
=== 1966–1969 ===
Hendrix' first single "Hey Joe" was intended for release by Track, but since the label was not yet fully in operation it was first released in the United Kingdom on Polydor in December 1966. His second single "Purple Haze", released on 17 March 1967, was the first Track Records single and Are You Experienced was the first LP. These and other Hendrix recordings released by Track were licensed to Reprise Records in the United States. The first Who single on Track was "Pictures of Lily" released in April 1967. The same year Track also issued the Who singles "The Last Time" and "I Can See for Miles" and the LP The Who Sell Out. The Who stayed with Decca Records in the United States until 1972, when Decca was folded into its parent company MCA Records.

By late 1967, Track faced a lawsuit from Ed Chalpin and his company PPX Enterprises, based in New York City. Chalpin had signed Hendrix to a three-year exclusive recording contract in October 1965. Chalpin viewed the 1966 Hendrix agreement with Track as a violation of his PPX contract and was later able to claim a large monetary settlement. Track quickly fell into financial trouble. Hendrix released Axis: Bold as Love in the United Kingdom in December 1967. The album appeared in the United States in January 1968 on Reprise.

British folk-rock band Fairport Convention issued their first single "If I Had a Ribbon Bow, on Track, on 23 February 1968, having recorded it at Sound Techniques, London, the previous August.

The Crazy World of Arthur Brown had a 1968 UK No. 1 hit with "Fire" which was co-produced by the Who's Pete Townshend and Kit Lambert. US versions of Arthur Brown's recordings were distributed by Atlantic Records; initial pressings of these records were branded with the Track Records imprint, and later ones with Atlantic's but retaining the same catalog numbers. "Fire" reached #2 on the US Billboard Hot 100 singles chart. Brown has claimed that he was never properly compensated by Track. Also in late 1968, Track released Jimi Hendrix's double album Electric Ladyland, one of his most successful recordings. Initial UK copies of the album featured a picture of 19 nude women which was not authorized by Hendrix.

In 1968, Track began releasing compilations albums such as the Who's Direct Hits. Some of these, including Electric Jimi Hendrix (1970) and the Who's Who Did It! (1970), are thought to have been sold only on a very limited basis through mail order, making them extremely rare today. A various artists compilation titled The House That Track Built was issued in 1969. In 1970, Track began a 14-album series titled Backtrack 1 through Backtrack 14. These were budget priced re-issues and new compilations of earlier Track recordings, occasionally containing previously unreleased material and rare versions. This series, which was very unusual for its time, included both Hendrix and the Who's first two Track albums along with works by lesser known Track artists. The reissue albums did not feature any of the original cover art.

Track also distributed the Apple Records release by John Lennon and Yoko Ono titled Two Virgins in the United Kingdom. Original stereo copies of this album from 1968 had a Track Records logo and matrix number (613 012) on the label. These were added to the artwork after EMI (Apple's distributor) refused to handle the record because of its controversial nude cover photo. Original UK mono copies of the record had no reference to Track, as these were apparently manufactured before Track assumed distribution. US distribution of Two Virgins was initially handled by Tetragrammaton Records.

The Who released the double album Tommy on Track in 1969, which was one of their biggest selling albums. The US version of the album was on Decca.

=== 1970–1978 ===
In March 1970, Track issued the live Hendrix album Band of Gypsys. This was the last album authorized by Hendrix before his death. As part of a legal settlement with PPX Enterprises release rights for the United States were assigned to Ed Chalpin who arranged to have the album released by Capitol Records. The UK cover featured pictures of Hendrix as a doll. The US version replaced the doll photos with a photograph of Hendrix performing under multicolored lights.

The Who released the album Live at Leeds in May 1970. In late 1970, the group Thunderclap Newman released their only album, Hollywood Dream on Track (through Atlantic in the United States). The album was another Pete Townshend production and contained the UK No. 1 hit "Something in the Air". The song also reached No. 25 in the United States.

Track released a three-song EP by Jimi Hendrix titled Voodoo Chile which was Hendrix's only No. 1 UK hit in 1971. After the posthumous Jimi Hendrix album The Cry of Love Polydor took over Hendrix's catalogue, except for the United States and Canada, where it remained with Reprise Records.

The Who released the compilation album Meaty Beaty Big and Bouncy and an album of new recordings Who's Next in late 1971, both of which were very successful. In 1972, the Dutch rock group Golden Earring had a successful UK tour with the Who and were signed to Track. Their album Moontan (1973) became their biggest international success. The album was released by Track/MCA in the United States. The hit song "Radar Love" was especially popular in the United States where the single reached No. 13. US versions of Who solo albums such as Pete Townshend's release Who Came First (1972) were released by Track/Decca.

In 1973, the Who produced Quadrophenia, their last album of new material released by Track (Track/MCA in the United States). In 1974, the Who fulfilled their contract with Track by releasing Odds & Sods. This album was compiled by John Entwistle from a batch of previously unreleased Who recordings made between 1964 and 1972. In 1974, the Who parted ways with Lambert and Stamp amid litigation. In a move initiated by Roger Daltrey, the band attempted to collect a large sum of unpaid royalties from Track. The Who moved to Polydor, except in United States and Canada, where they remained with MCA. Polydor later became a sister label to MCA after Universal Music Group absorbed PolyGram in 1999.

By 1975, Track was left with only Golden Earring on its roster, who also soon left. After this, Track only released two more LPs, one by the Heartbreakers, and one by Shakin' Stevens. Track ceased business operations in 1978, though Track albums that remained in print in the UK remained on the Track label until the distributor re-issued them on Polydor a few years later. Kit Lambert died in 1981 at the age of 45.

=== 1999–present ===
In 1999 Stamp gave the rights to the name to Ian Grant who relaunched the label with his logo, but without the rights to the back catalogue. Ian Grant was then the manager of the Stranglers, the Cult, and Big Country. He released recordings by Lach,Joe Brown, Hugh Cornwell, Big Country, Phil Mogg's $ign Of 4, Noel Redding, Dennis Locorriere, Deborah Bonham and again the Crazy World of Arthur Brown (Vampire Suite album) and Thunderclap Newman (Beyond Hollywood) among others.

== List of Track Record artists 1967–1978 ==
- Arthur Brown
- Roger Daltrey
- Eire Apparent
- John Entwistle
- Andy Ellison
- Fairport Convention
- Golden Earring
- The Heartbreakers
- The Jimi Hendrix Experience
- Labelle
- Marsha Hunt
- John's Children
- John Lennon and Yoko Ono
- The Parliaments
- Murray Roman
- Shakin' Stevens
- Pete Townshend
- Thunderclap Newman
- The Who
- John Otway and Wild Willy Barrett
