= Poison discography =

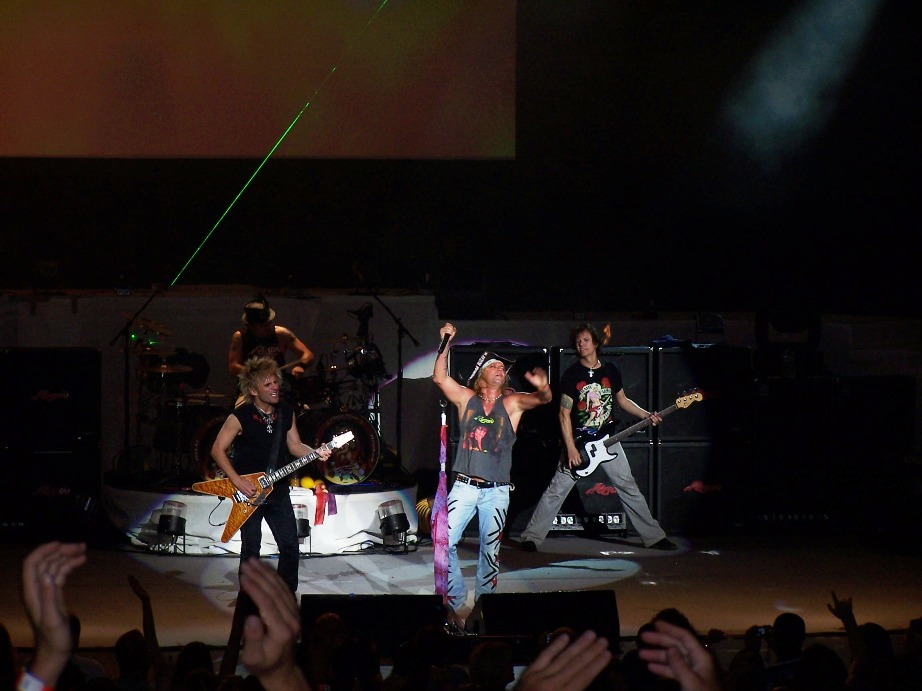
- Poison performing in 2006
- Studio albums: 7
- Live albums: 4
- Compilation albums: 7
- Singles: 30
- Video albums: 9
- Music videos: 20
- Box sets: 2

The following is a comprehensive discography of Poison, an American glam metal band that achieved huge success in the mid-1980s to mid-1990s. Poison sold more than 15 million records in the United States alone. The band has also charted ten singles to the Top 40 of the Billboard Hot 100, including six Top 10 singles and the Hot 100 number-one single, "Every Rose Has Its Thorn". The band became icons of the 1980s MTV era and have had widespread commercial success. The band's breakthrough debut album, the multi-platinum Look What the Cat Dragged In was released in 1986 and they hit their peak with the second album, the multi-platinum selling Open Up and Say... Ahh! which became the band's most successful album ever. The popularity continued into the new decade with their third consecutive multi-platinum selling album Flesh & Blood.

In the 1990s following the release of the band's first live album Swallow This Live, the band experienced some line up changes and the fall of glam metal with the grunge movement, but despite the drop in popularity the band's fourth studio album Native Tongue still achieved Gold status and the band's first compilation album Poison's Greatest Hits: 1986–1996 went double platinum.

In the 2000s, with the original line up back together, the band found new popularity after a successful greatest hits reunion tour in 1999. The band began the new decade with the release of the long-awaited Crack a Smile... and More!, followed by the Power to the People album. The band toured almost every year to sold out stadiums and arenas. They released a brand new album Hollyweird in 2002 and in 2006 the band celebrated their 20-year anniversary with The Best of Poison: 20 Years of Rock tour and album, which was certified gold and marked Poison's return to the Billboard 200 top 20 charts for the first time since 1993. After over 35 years, the band is still recording music and performing.

Since their debut in 1986, they have released seven studio albums, four live albums, seven compilation albums, and have issued 28 singles to radio.

== Albums ==
=== Studio albums ===
Title	Album details	Peak chart positions												Certifications (sales threshold)
Title	Album details	US	AUS	AUT	CAN	GER	JPN	NL	NOR	NZ	SWE	SWI	UK	Certifications (sales threshold)
Look What the Cat Dragged In	Release date: May 23, 1986; Label: Enigma/Capitol; Formats: LP, CD, CT	3	51	—	14	—	—	—	—	—	—	—	—	US: 3× Platinum; CAN: Platinum; UK: Silver
Open Up and Say... Ahh!	Release date: April 27, 1988; Label: Enigma/Capitol; Formats: LP, CD, CT	2	7	—	10	—	35	—	17	1	37	30	18	US: 5× Platinum; AUS: 3× Platinum; CAN: 4× Platinum; UK: Gold; NZ: Platinum
Flesh & Blood	Release date: July 10, 1990; Label: Enigma/Capitol; Formats: LP, CD, CT	2	2	17	4	31	23	88	11	4	17	11	3	US: 3× Platinum; AUS: Platinum; CAN: 4× Platinum; UK: Gold; NZ: Gold
Native Tongue	Release date: February 8, 1993; Label: Capitol; Formats: CD, CT	16	60	39	26	60	39	54	39	—	39	24	20	US: Gold; CAN: Platinum
Crack a Smile... and More!	Released: March 14, 2000; Label: Capitol; Formats: CD, CT	131	—	—	—	—	—	—	—	—	—	—	—	
Hollyweird	Release date: May 21, 2002; Label: Cyanide; Formats: CD	103	—	—	—	—	—	—	—	—	—	—	—	
Poison'd!	Release date: June 5, 2007; Label: Capitol; Formats: CD	32	—	—	—	—	—	—	—	—	—	—	—	
"—" denotes releases that did not chart

=== Live albums ===
Title	Album details	Peak chart positions				Certifications (sales threshold)
Title	Album details	US	US Indie	UK	AUS	Certifications (sales threshold)
Swallow This Live	Release date: November 12, 1991; Label: Capitol; Formats: LP, CD, CT	51	—	52	46	US: Gold
Power to the People	Release date: June 13, 2000; Label: Cyanide Records; Formats: CD	166	12	—	—	—
Great Big Hits Live! Bootleg	Release date: July 4, 2006; Label: Sony BMG; Formats: CD	—	—	—	—	—
Live, Raw & Uncut	Release date: July 15, 2008; Label: Koch; Formats: DVD + CD	8	—	—	—	—
Seven Days Live	Release date: August 26, 2008; Label: Armoury; Formats: CD	—	—	—	—	—
"—" denotes releases that did not chart

=== Compilation albums ===
Title	Album details	Peak positions						Certifications (sales threshold)
Title	Album details	US	US Rock	US Hard Rock	Top Catalog Albums	CAN	UK Rock	Certifications (sales threshold)
Poison's Greatest Hits: 1986–1996	Release date: November 26, 1996; Label: Capitol; Formats: CD, CT	—	—	—	2	—	25	US: 2× Platinum; CAN: Gold; UK: Silver
Rock Champions	Release date: 2001; Label: EMI Plus; Formats: CD	—	—	—	—	—	—	
Best of Ballads & Blues	Release date: August 5, 2003; Label: Capitol; Formats: CD	141	—	—	—	—	—	
The Best of Poison: 20 Years of Rock	Release date: April 3, 2006; Label: Capitol; Formats: CD	17	5	10	4	68	—	US: Gold
Poison - 10 Great Songs	Release date: January 12, 2010; Re-released in 2014 as "Poison: The Millennium Collection"; Label: EMI; Formats: CD	145	40	13	—	—	—	
Double Dose: Ultimate Hits	Release date: May 3, 2011; Label: Capitol; Formats: CD	—	—	23	—	17	—	
Poison: Icon	Release date: March 19, 2013; Label: EMI; Formats: CD	—	—	—	—	—	—	
Poison: Gold	Release date: January 21, 2014; Label: UMG; Formats: CD	—	—	—	—	—	—	
"—" denotes releases that did not chart

=== Box sets ===
Year	Album details
2009	Poison – Box Set (Collector's Edition): Release date: 2009; Label: Madacy; Formats: CD
2010	Nothin' But a Good Time: The Poison Collection: Release date: 2010; Re-release of The Best of Poison: 20 Years of Rock and Swallow This Live (2004 remastered version); Label: Capitol; Formats: CD

== Singles ==
Year	Single	Peak chart positions											Certifications (sales threshold)	Album
Year	Single	US	US Main	CAN	AUS	GER	IRE	NL	NZ	SWE	SWI	UK	Certifications (sales threshold)	Album
1986	"Cry Tough"	—	—	—	—	—	—	—	—	—	—	97		Look What the Cat Dragged In
1987	"Talk Dirty to Me"	9	—	9	55	—	—	—	—	—	—	67		Look What the Cat Dragged In
1987	"I Want Action"	50	—	—	—	—	—	—	—	—	—	—		Look What the Cat Dragged In
1987	"I Won't Forget You"	13	—	38	—	—	—	—	37	—	—	—		Look What the Cat Dragged In
1987	"Rock and Roll All Nite" (promo only)	—	—	—	—	—	—	—	—	—	—	—		Less than Zero (OST)
1988	"Nothin' But A Good Time"	6	19	36	10	—	23	—	—	—	—	35		Open Up and Say... Ahh!
1988	"Fallen Angel"	12	32	55	21	—	—	—	32	—	—	59		Open Up and Say... Ahh!
1988	"Every Rose Has Its Thorn"	1	11	2	16	38	8	18	8	20	12	13	US: Gold	Open Up and Say... Ahh!
1989	"Your Mama Don't Dance"	10	39	17	21	—	15	—	3	—	—	13		Open Up and Say... Ahh!
1990	"Unskinny Bop"	3	5	3	7	—	24	34	3	19	—	15	AUS: Gold; CAN: Gold; US: Gold	Flesh & Blood
1990	"Something to Believe In"	4	5	3	44	—	23	—	38	—	—	35	US: Gold	Flesh & Blood
1990	"Ride the Wind"	38	25	31	113	—	—	—	—	—	—	—		Flesh & Blood
1991	"Life Goes On"	35	—	—	—	—	—	—	—	—	—	—		Flesh & Blood
1991	"(Flesh & Blood) Sacrifice (promo only)"	—	—	—	—	—	—	88	—	—	—	—		Flesh & Blood
1991	"So Tell Me Why"	—	—	—	142	—	—	—	—	—	—	25		Swallow This Live
1993	"Stand"	50	15	15	80	—	—	—	—	—	39	25		Native Tongue
1993	"Until You Suffer Some"	104	—	—	104	—	—	—	—	—	—	32		Native Tongue
1993	"Body Talk" (promo only)	—	—	—	—	—	—	—	—	—	—	—		Native Tongue
1994	"7 Days Over You" (promo only)	—	—	—	—	—	—	—	—	—	—	—		Native Tongue
1994	"The Scream" (promo only)	—	—	—	—	—	—	—	—	—	—	—		Native Tongue
2000	"Shut Up, Make Love"	—	—	31	—	—	—	—	—	—	—	—		Crack a Smile... and More!
2000	"Be the One" (promo only)	—	—	—	—	—	—	—	—	—	—	—		Crack a Smile... and More!
2000	"Power to the People"	—	—	66	—	—	—	—	—	—	—	—		Power to the People
2000	"The Last Song"	—	—	—	—	—	—	—	—	—	—	—		Power to the People
2001	"Rockstar"	—	—	—	—	—	—	—	—	—	—	—		Hollyweird
2002	"Squeeze Box"	—	—	—	—	—	—	—	—	—	—	—		Hollyweird
2002	"Shooting Star"	—	—	—	—	—	—	—	—	—	—	—		Hollyweird
2006	"We're an American Band"	—	—	—	—	—	—	—	—	—	—	—		The Best of Poison: 20 Years of Rock
2007	"What I Like About You"	—	—	—	—	—	—	—	—	—	—	—		Poison'd!
2007	"SexyBack"	—	—	—	—	—	—	—	—	—	—	—		Poison'd!
"—" denotes releases that did not chart

== Videography ==
=== Video albums ===
Title	Album details	Peak positions	Certifications (sales threshold)
Title	Album details	US Video	Certifications (sales threshold)
Sight for Sore Ears	Release date: 1989; Label: Picture Music International	—	US: Gold; CAN: Gold
Flesh, Blood, & Videotape	Release date: 1991; Label: Picture Music International	—	US: Gold
Seven Days Live	Release date: 1993, DVD - 2006.; Label: Picture Music International (Cherry Red, DVD only)	—	
VH1 Behind the Music: Poison	Release date: 1999, Re-released with extra footage in 2010.; Label: VH1	—	
Poison Greatest Video Hits	Release date: 2001; Label: Capitol Records	—	US: Gold
Nothing But a Good Time! Unauthorized	Release date: 2003; Label: Capitol Records	—	
Poison Video Hits	Release date: 2005; Label: Capitol Records	—	
The Best of Poison: 20 Years of Rock (DVD)	Release date: April 3, 2006; Label: EMI America	17	US: Gold
Live, Raw & Uncut (DVD)	Release date: 2008; Label: E1 Music	8	
"—" denotes releases that did not chart

=== Promo videos ===
Year	Song	Director
1986	"Cry Tough"	John Jopson
1986	"Talk Dirty to Me"	Doug Freel
1986	"I Want Action"	John Jopson
1987	"I Won't Forget You"	
1988	"Nothin' But a Good Time"	Marc Reshovsky
1988	"Fallen Angel"	Marty Callner
1988	"Every Rose Has Its Thorn"	Marty Callner
1989	"Your Mamma Don't Dance"	Marty Callner
1990	"Unskinny Bop"	Marty Callner
1990	"Something to Believe In"	Marty Callner
1990	"Ride the Wind"	Marty Callner
1991	"Life Goes On"	Marty Callner
1991	"(Flesh & Blood) Sacrifice"	Marty Callner
1991	"So Tell Me Why"	Marty Callner
1992	"Stand"	Samuel Bayer
1993	"Until You Suffer Some (Fire and Ice)"	
2000	"Power to the People"	Poison
2002	"Squeeze Box"	
2006	"We're An American Band"	Poison
2007	"What I Like About You"	
