= Double Dose: Ultimate Hits =

Compilation album by Poison
- Released: May 3, 2011
- Recorded: 1986–2007
- Genre: Glam metal; hard rock; blues rock
- Length: 2:17:08
- Label: Capitol

Poison chronology
Poison – Box Set (Collector's Edition) (2009)	Double Dose: Ultimate Hits (2011)

Double Dose: Ultimate Hits is a double-disc compilation album by the glam metal band Poison, released by Capitol Records on May 3, 2011, to commemorate the band's 25th anniversary. The album charted at No. 23 on the Billboard Top Hard Rock Albums chart and No. 17 in Canada.

== Release and promotion ==
Poison announced a 2011 summer tour with fellow rockers Mötley Crüe and the New York Dolls to celebrate the band's 25th anniversary and also Mötley Crüe's 30th anniversary.

The compilation features tracks from the following albums: Look What the Cat Dragged In, Open Up and Say... Ahh!, Flesh & Blood, Swallow This Live, Native Tongue, Poison's Greatest Hits: 1986–1996, Crack a Smile... and More!, The Best of Poison: 20 Years of Rock and Poison'd. Only the albums Power to the People and Hollyweird are not represented.

The compilation includes all of Poison's hit singles that charted on the Billboard Hot 100 and Mainstream rock charts.

== Track listing ==
All tracks are written by Bret Michaels, Bobby Dall, Rikki Rockett, and C.C. DeVille, except where noted.

Disc 1
No.	Title	Writer(s)	Original album	Length
1.	"Nothin' But a Good Time"		Open Up and Say... Ahh! (1988)	3:44
2.	"Talk Dirty to Me"		Look What the Cat Dragged In (1986)	3:44
3.	"Look What the Cat Dragged In"		Look What the Cat Dragged In	3:11
4.	"Be the One"	Michaels; Dall; Rockett; Blues Saraceno	Crack a Smile... and More! (2000)	5:39
5.	"We're an American Band" (Grand Funk Railroad cover)	Don Brewer	The Best of Poison: 20 Years of Rock (2006)	3:10
6.	"Life Goes On"		Flesh & Blood (1990)	4:48
7.	"Every Rose Has Its Thorn"		Open Up and Say... Ahh!	4:19
8.	"Stand"	Michaels; Dall; Rockett; Richie Kotzen	Native Tongue (1993)	5:14
9.	"Livin' for the Minute"		Open Up and Say... Ahh!: 20th Anniversary Edition (2008)	2:41
10.	"Little Willy" (The Sweet cover)	Nicky Chinn; Mike Chapman	Poison'd (2007)	3:18
11.	"(Flesh & Blood) Sacrifice"		Flesh & Blood	4:41
12.	"I Won't Forget You"		Look What the Cat Dragged In	3:35
13.	"Rock and Roll All Nite" (Kiss cover)	Paul Stanley; Gene Simmons	Less than Zero soundtrack (1987)	3:35
14.	"Love on the Rocks"		Open Up and Say... Ahh!	3:33
15.	"Suffragette City" (David Bowie cover)	David Bowie	Poison'd	2:56
16.	"Lay Your Body Down"	Michaels; Dall; Rockett; Saraceno	Poison's Greatest Hits: 1986–1996 (1996)	5:27
17.	"Until You Suffer Some (Fire and Ice)"	Michaels; Dall; Rockett; Kotzen	Native Tongue	4:13
18.	"No More Lookin' Back (Poison Jazz)"		Swallow This Live (1991)	3:18

Disc 2
No.	Title	Writer(s)	From album	Length
1.	"Unskinny Bop"		Flesh & Blood	3:49
2.	"Cry Tough"		Look What the Cat Dragged In	3:37
3.	"I Want Action"		Look What the Cat Dragged In	3:05
4.	"Your Mama Don't Dance" (Loggins and Messina cover)	Kenny Loggins; Jim Messina	Open Up and Say... Ahh!	3:00
5.	"Something to Believe In"		Flesh & Blood	5:30
6.	"Fallen Angel"		Open Up and Say... Ahh!	3:57
7.	"Ride the Wind"		Flesh & Blood	3:51
8.	"Bastard Son of a Thousand Blues"	Michaels; Dall; Rockett; Kotzen	Native Tongue	4:56
9.	"Sexual Thing"	Michaels; Dall; Rockett; Saraceno	Poison's Greatest Hits: 1986–1996	3:34
10.	"Can't You See" (The Marshall Tucker Band cover)	Toy Caldwell	Poison'd	4:56
11.	"So Tell Me Why"		Swallow This Live	3:22
12.	"What I Like About You" (The Romantics cover)	Wally Palmar; Mike Skill; Jimmy Marinos	Poison'd	2:58
13.	"Face the Hangman"	Michaels; Dall; Rockett; Saraceno	Crack a Smile... and More!	3:19
14.	"Cover of the Rolling Stone" (Dr. Hook & The Medicine Show cover)	Shel Silverstein	Crack a Smile... and More!	3:08
15.	"Poor Boy Blues"		Flesh & Blood	4:52
16.	"Look But You Can't Touch"		Open Up and Say... Ahh!	3:26
17.	"Theatre of the Soul"	Michaels; Dall; Rockett; Kotzen	Native Tongue	4:41

== Personnel ==
- Bret Michaels - lead vocals
- Bobby Dall - bass guitar
- Rikki Rockett - drums
- C.C. DeVille - lead guitar
- Blues Saraceno - lead guitar
- Richie Kotzen - lead guitar

== Charts ==
Chart (2011)	Peak position
US Top Hard Rock Albums (Billboard)	23
