= Poison's Greatest Hits: 1986–1996 =

Greatest hits album by Poison
- Released: November 26, 1996
- Recorded: 1986–1995
- Genre: Glam metal; hard rock
- Length: 72:42
- Label: Capitol
- Producer: Ric Browde; Tom Werman; Bruce Fairbairn; Richie Zito; John Purdell; Duane Baron

Poison chronology
Native Tongue (1993)	Poison's Greatest Hits: 1986–1996 (1996)	Crack a Smile... and More! (2000)

Professional ratings
Review scores
Source	Rating
Allmusic	4/5 stars

Poison's Greatest Hits: 1986–1996 is the first greatest hits compilation CD by the glam metal band Poison, released on November 26, 1996, by Capitol Records to celebrate the band's 10th anniversary. The album contains 16 tracks from the band's first four studio albums (Look What the Cat Dragged In, Open Up and Say... Ahh!, Flesh & Blood and Native Tongue) and also the live double-album Swallow This Live.

== Background and release ==
Blues Saraceno replaced Richie Kotzen as lead guitarist after the last album Native Tongue and The Greatest Hits features two bonus new tracks with Blues Saraceno on lead guitar: "Lay Your Body Down" and "Sexual Thing".

The compilation charted at number 2 on the Top Catalog Albums chart in Billboard magazine and includes most of Poison's hit singles which charted on the Billboard Hot 100 or mainstream rock charts. The compilation was certified Gold in 1999 and by 2005 the album had gone double platinum. It was certified gold in Canada.

== Track listing ==
All tracks are written by Bret Michaels, C.C. DeVille, Bobby Dall and Rikki Rockett, except where noted.

No.	Title	Writer(s)	Original album	Length
1.	"Nothin' But a Good Time"		Open Up and Say... Ahh! (1988)	3:44
2.	"Talk Dirty to Me"		Look What the Cat Dragged In (1986)	3:44
3.	"Unskinny Bop"		Flesh & Blood (1990)	3:49
4.	"Every Rose Has Its Thorn"		Open Up and Say... Ahh!	4:21
5.	"Fallen Angel"		Open Up and Say... Ahh!	3:59
6.	"I Won't Forget You"		Look What the Cat Dragged In	3:35
7.	"Stand"	Michaels; Dall; Rockett; Richie Kotzen	Native Tongue (1993)	5:16
8.	"Ride the Wind"		Flesh & Blood	3:52
9.	"Look What the Cat Dragged In"		Look What the Cat Dragged In	3:11
10.	"I Want Action"		Look What the Cat Dragged In	3:06
11.	"Life Goes On"		Flesh & Blood	4:48
12.	"(Flesh & Blood) Sacrifice"		Flesh & Blood	4:41
13.	"Cry Tough"		Look What the Cat Dragged In	3:39
14.	"Your Mama Don't Dance" (Loggins and Messina cover)	Kenny Loggins; Jim Messina	Open Up and Say... Ahh!	3:02
15.	"So Tell Me Why"		Swallow This Live (1991)	3:23
16.	"Something to Believe In"		Flesh & Blood	5:29
17.	"Sexual Thing"	Michaels; Dall; Rockett; Blues Saraceno	New recording (1996)	3:35
18.	"Lay Your Body Down"	Michaels; Dall; Rockett; Saraceno	New recording (1996)	5:28
Total length:				72:12

Track information verified from the album's liner notes.

== New tracks ==
The album Crack a Smile featuring Blues Saraceno on lead guitar contained tracks recorded 1994–1995 but remained unreleased at the time of this compilation's release. Therefore, the last 2 tracks included here were first released on this album as bonus new tracks (1996) and then released again on the Crack a Smile... and More! album in 2000, which was the next Poison album to be released.

Some copies of the album had a hidden picture of the band featuring CC Deville underneath the CD tray. The CD tray was not made of see through material, and therefore the image was covered up by the neon green plastic.

== Personnel ==
- Bret Michaels - lead vocals, rhythm guitar, harmonica
- Bobby Dall - bass, piano
- Rikki Rockett - drums
- Blues Saraceno - lead guitar on new tracks 17–18
- C.C. DeVille - lead guitar on tracks 1–6, 8–16
- Richie Kotzen - lead guitar on track 7

== Charts ==
Chart (1997–1999)	Peak position
UK Rock & Metal Albums (OCC)	25
US Top Catalog Albums (Billboard)	2

== Certifications ==
Region	Certification	Certified units/sales
Canada (Music Canada)	Gold	50,000^{^}
United Kingdom (BPI)	Silver	60,000^{‡}
United States (RIAA)	2× Platinum	2,000,000^{^}
^{^} Shipments figures based on certification alone.^{‡} Sales+streaming figures based on certification alone.
