= Flesh, Blood, & Videotape =

Video by Poison
- Released: 1991
- Genre: Hard rock
- Label: Capitol

Flesh, Blood, & Videotape is the 2nd video album from the rock band Poison, featuring the singles / music videos from Poison's 3rd studio album Flesh & Blood and also features behind the scenes footage and in depth interviews. The album titled track and single "(Flesh & Blood) Sacrifice" featured a music video which was initially banned from MTV due to its explicit nature and was eventually released on this compilation.

The video compilation was re-released on DVD in 2001 as part of Poison Greatest Video Hits, which received US Gold certification in 2003.

== Track listing ==
1. Let It Play (Montage clip)
2. Unskinny Bop
3. Ride the Wind
4. Poor Boy Blues (Montage clip)
5. Something To Believe In
6. Life Goes On
7. (Flesh & Blood) Sacrifice

== Band members ==
- Bret Michaels - lead vocals
- C.C. DeVille - lead guitar
- Bobby Dall - bass
- Rikki Rockett - drums
