= The Best of Poison: 20 Years of Rock =

Greatest hits album by Poison
- Released: April 3, 2006
- Recorded: 1986–2006
- Genre: Glam metal; hard rock; blues rock
- Length: 71:19
- Label: Capitol
- Producer: Don Was

Poison chronology
Best of Ballads & Blues (2003)	The Best of Poison: 20 Years of Rock (2006)	Poison'd! (2007)

Singles from The Best of Poison: 20 Years of Rock
- 1. "We're an American Band" Released: 2006

Professional ratings
Review scores
Source	Rating
Allmusic	4/5 stars

The Best of Poison: 20 Years of Rock is a compilation album from the American glam metal band Poison, released by Capitol Records on April 3, 2006, to celebrate the band's 20th anniversary. It sold more than one million copies to date in the U.S. as of September 2009.

== Release and promotion ==
The Best of Poison: 20 Years of Rock features many songs from the band's 20-year career. Most notable is the song "Every Rose Has Its Thorn", which was the band's biggest hit, a power ballad. A rare cover of the Kiss classic "Rock and Roll All Nite" appears, previously only available on the soundtrack to the movie "Less Than Zero". The compilation also includes a new single, the Grand Funk Railroad roadie classic "We're an American Band", which also features a music video.

The cover art is taken from the book Pornography: Opposing Viewpoints.

The album was produced by Don Was and marked Poison's return to the Billboard 200 top 20 charts for the first time since 1993. The compilation debuted at No. 17, quite an impressive showing for a hair metal band in 2006, and perhaps showing the beneficial effect of many Behind the Music-type shows on VH1, where Poison's hair metal antics were relived. The album also charted at No. 5 on the Top Rock Albums, No. 4 on the Top Catalog Albums and No. 10 on the Top Hard Rock Albums chart.

The Best of Poison: 20 Years of Rock was certified Gold in 2006 by the RIAA.

The album was bundled with the 2004 remastered single-disc version of Swallow This Live in the 2010 box set Nothin' But a Good Time: The Poison Collection.

== Track listing ==
All tracks are written by Bret Michaels, Bobby Dall, Rikki Rockett, and C.C. DeVille, except where noted.

No.	Title	Writer(s)	{{{extra_column}}}	Length
1.	"Talk Dirty to Me"		Look What the Cat Dragged In (1986)	3:44
2.	"I Want Action" (Single Version)		Look What the Cat Dragged In	3:05
3.	"I Won't Forget You" (Single Version)		Look What the Cat Dragged In	3:34
4.	"Cry Tough"		Look What the Cat Dragged In	3:38
5.	"Look What the Cat Dragged In"		Look What the Cat Dragged In	3:10
6.	"Nothin' But a Good Time"		Open Up and Say... Ahh! (1988)	3:43
7.	"Fallen Angel"		Open Up and Say... Ahh!	3:56
8.	"Every Rose Has Its Thorn"		Open Up and Say... Ahh!	4:20
9.	"Your Mama Don't Dance" (Loggins and Messina cover)	Kenny Loggins; Jim Messina	Open Up and Say... Ahh!	3:00
10.	"Unskinny Bop"		Flesh & Blood (1990)	3:49
11.	"Rock and Roll All Nite" (Kiss cover)	Paul Stanley; Gene Simmons	Less Than Zero soundtrack (1987)	3:35
12.	"Ride the Wind"		Flesh & Blood	3:53
13.	"Something to Believe In"		Flesh & Blood	5:30
14.	"Life Goes On"		Flesh & Blood	4:49
15.	"Stand"	Michaels; Dall; Rockett; Richie Kotzen	Native Tongue (1993)	5:14
16.	"The Last Song"		Power to the People (2000)	4:22
17.	"Shooting Star"		Hollyweird (2002)	4:37
18.	"We're an American Band" (Grand Funk Railroad cover)	Don Brewer	New recording	3:10
Total length:				71:19

== DVD ==
A special edition of The Best of Poison: 20 Years of Rock was released which included a bonus greatest hits DVD compilation. The DVD includes the new video "We're an American Band" plus some of the band's biggest hits.

1. I Want Action
2. Every Rose Has Its Thorn
3. Your Mama Don't Dance
4. Nothin' But a Good Time
5. Something To Believe In
6. Unskinny Bop
7. Talk Dirty to Me - Live on MTV Unplugged
8. We're an American Band

== Personnel ==
- Bret Michaels - lead vocals; rhythm guitar, acoustic guitar (track 4,8,13,15), keyboards
- Bobby Dall - bass guitar, piano (track 13)
- Rikki Rockett - drums; percussion
- C.C. DeVille - lead guitar, keyboards (track 3,8,14)
- Richie Kotzen - lead guitar (track 15)
- Evren Göknar - mastering engineer

== Charts ==
Chart (2006)	Peak position
US Billboard 200	17
US Top Catalog Albums (Billboard)	4
US Top Hard Rock Albums (Billboard)	10
US Top Rock Albums (Billboard)	5

== Certifications ==
Region	Certification	Certified units/sales
United States (RIAA)	Gold	500,000^{^}
^{^} Shipments figures based on certification alone.
