= Swallow This Live =

Live album with studio tracks by Poison
- Released: November 12, 1991
- Recorded: 1991
- Venue: Miami, FL; Orlando, FL; Tampa, FL; Irvine Meadows Amphitheatre, Irvine, CA
- Genre: Glam metal
- Length: 1:55:09 (Double CD version); 74:06 (Single CD version); 76:45 (2004 remastered single CD version)
- Label: Capitol
- Producer: Poison

Poison chronology
Flesh & Blood (1990)	Swallow This Live (1991)	Native Tongue (1993)

Singles from Swallow This Live
- 1. "So Tell Me Why" Released: November 1991

Professional ratings
Review scores
Source	Rating
AllMusic	3/5 stars

Swallow This Live is the first live album by American glam metal band Poison. It was released in 1991 by Capitol Records. Swallow This Live peaked at No. 51 on the Billboard 200, No. 42 on the Cash Box albums chart, and was certified Gold in 2001 by the RIAA.

== Production and marketing ==
The album features 16 live tracks from Poison's first three studio albums: Look What the Cat Dragged In, Open Up and Say... Ahh!, and Flesh & Blood. These live tracks were recorded in Miami, Orlando, and Tampa in Florida, as well as the Irvine Meadows Amphitheatre in California during Poison’s Flesh & Blood world tour. The album also contains four new studio tracks, which were the last recorded before guitarist C.C. DeVille departed from Poison later in 1991. One of these, "So Tell Me Why", was released as a single and reached number 25 in the United Kingdom in November 1991.

The album was initially released in a two-disc set and an abridged single-disc edition. In 2004, it was remastered in a single-disc release, omitting the studio tracks and adding three tracks from the two-disc version, as well as moving "Every Rose Has Its Thorn" to the end of the track listing.

The 2004 remastered single-disc version album was bundled with The Best of Poison: 20 Years of Rock in the 2010 box set Nothin' But a Good Time: The Poison Collection.

== Track listing ==
All tracks are written by Bret Michaels, C.C. DeVille, Bobby Dall and Rikki Rockett, except where noted.

Disc 1
No.	Title	Writer(s)	Length
1.	"Intro"		1:20
2.	"Look What the Cat Dragged In"		3:36
3.	"Look But You Can't Touch"		4:05
4.	"Let It Play"		4:31
5.	"Good Love"		3:52
6.	"Life Goes On"		6:12
7.	"Ride the Wind"		4:11
8.	"I Want Action"		4:58
9.	"Drum Solo"	Rockett	8:21
10.	"Something to Believe In"		6:15
11.	"Poor Boy Blues"		8:19
12.	"Unskinny Bop"		3:57
Total length:			59:37

Disc 2
No.	Title	Writer(s)	Length
1.	"Love on the Rocks"		4:27
2.	"Guitar Solo"	DeVille	11:03
3.	"Every Rose Has Its Thorn"		4:27
4.	"Fallen Angel"		4:48
5.	"Your Mama Don't Dance" (Loggins and Messina cover)	Kenny Loggins; Jim Messina	3:12
6.	"Nothin' But a Good Time"		7:43
7.	"Talk Dirty to Me"		5:52
8.	"So Tell Me Why" (New studio track)		3:23
9.	"Souls on Fire" (New studio track)		3:19
10.	"Only Time Will Tell" (New studio track)		4:00
11.	"No More Lookin' Back (Poison Jazz)" (New studio track)		3:19
Total length:			55:32

Single disc version
No.	Title	Writer(s)	Length
1.	"Intro"		0:39
2.	"Look What the Cat Dragged In"		3:10
3.	"Look But You Can't Touch"		3:58
4.	"Good Love"		3:28
5.	"I Want Action"		6:38
6.	"Something to Believe In"		5:59
7.	"Poor Boy Blues"		6:55
8.	"Unskinny Bop"		4:16
9.	"Every Rose Has Its Thorn"		4:22
10.	"Fallen Angel"		4:48
11.	"Your Mama Don't Dance"	Loggins; Messina	3:17
12.	"Nothin' But a Good Time"		6:57
13.	"Talk Dirty to Me"		5:41
14.	"So Tell Me Why"		3:23
15.	"Souls on Fire"		3:19
16.	"Only Time Will Tell"		4:00
17.	"No More Lookin' Back (Poison Jazz)"		3:19
Total length:			74:06

2004 remastered single disc version
No.	Title	Writer(s)	Length
1.	"Intro"		1:19
2.	"Look What the Cat Dragged In"		3:43
3.	"Look But You Can't Touch"		4:09
4.	"Let It Play"		4:38
5.	"Good Love"		3:42
6.	"Life Goes On"		6:17
7.	"Ride the Wind"		4:13
8.	"I Want Action"		4:44
9.	"Unskinny Bop"		4:04
10.	"Something to Believe In"		6:06
11.	"Love on the Rocks"		3:55
12.	"Fallen Angel"		4:48
13.	"Your Mama Don't Dance"	Loggins; Messina	3:12
14.	"Nothin' But a Good Time"		7:52
15.	"Talk Dirty to Me"		4:28
16.	"Every Rose Has Its Thorn"		9:35
Total length:			76:45

== Pay per view concert ==
Swallow This Live: Flesh & Blood World Tour is a live video by the American glam metal band Poison. Recorded at the Irvine Meadows Amphitheatre on May 19, 1991, the concert was part of the band's 1990/91 world tour in support of their third studio album Flesh & Blood. The concert was never released on home video but did air as a pay-per-view special in 1992.

No.	Title	Writer(s)	Length
1.	"Look What the Cat Dragged In"
2.	"I Want Action"
3.	"Ride the Wind"
4.	"Life Goes On"
5.	"Let It Play"
6.	"Rikki's Solo"	Rockett
7.	"Something to Believe In"
8.	"Good Love"
9.	"Poor Boy Blues"
10.	"Unskinny Bop"
11.	"Love on the Rocks"
12.	"Guitar Solo"	DeVille
13.	"Every Rose Has Its Thorn"
14.	"Fallen Angel"
15.	"Your Mama Don't Dance" (Loggins and Messina cover)	Kenny Loggins; Jim Messina
16.	"Nothin' But a Good Time"
17.	"Talk Dirty to Me"

== Personnel ==
- Bret Michaels – lead vocals, rhythm guitar, harmonica
- C.C. DeVille – lead guitar, backing vocals
- Bobby Dall – bass, backing vocals
- Rikki Rockett – drums, backing vocals

== Charts ==
Chart (1991–1992)	Peak position
Australian Albums (ARIA)	46
Japanese Albums (Oricon)	47
UK Albums (OCC)	52
US Billboard 200	51

== Certifications ==
Region	Certification	Certified units/sales
United States (RIAA)	Gold	500,000^{^}
^{^} Shipments figures based on certification alone.
