= Poison'd! =

Studio album (part compilation) by Poison
- Released: June 5, 2007
- Recorded: 1987–2007
- Genres: Hard rock; glam metal
- Length: 43:28; 46:48 (Walmart release)
- Label: Capitol
- Producers: Don Was; Rick Rubin; Thom Panunzio; Ric Browde; Tom Werman

Poison chronology
The Best of Poison: 20 Years of Rock (2006)	Poison'd! (2007)	Live Raw & Uncut CD (2008)

Singles from Poison'd!
- 1. "What I Like About You" Released: 2007; 2. "SexyBack" Released: 2007

Professional ratings
Review scores
Source	Rating
About.com	3/5 stars
AllMusic	3/5 stars
antiMusic	3/5 stars
KNAC	4/5 stars
Paste	(favorable)
Rolling Stone	2.5/5 stars

Poison'd! is the seventh and final studio album by American glam metal band Poison, released through Capitol Records on June 5, 2007. The 14-track album features cover versions of the band's favorite rock classics. Nine new tracks and five previously released covers make up the album.

== Release and promotion ==
The first single to be released from the album was a cover of the Romantics' "What I Like About You" which also featured a music video from the band.

The album entered the Billboard 200 chart at #32, selling 21,000 copies in its first week. The album also charted at #12 on the Top Rock Albums chart A concert from the supporting tour was featured on the Poison DVD "Live, Raw & Uncut", which was the band's next release.

== Song information ==
On January 3, 2007, Poison announced on their official Myspace page that they would like their fans to help pick favourite classic rock songs for the new studio album that they are to record. The fans replied with suggestions like Lynyrd Skynyrd's "Freebird", Sweet's "The Ballroom Blitz", and AC/DC's "You Shook Me All Night Long", along with what might be an obvious choice - Alice Cooper's "Poison". On January 28, Rikki Rockett explained,

The Album will be ready for a summer Poison tour. p.s. The songs we are doing are NOT what you expect

— Rikki Rockett

=== Singles ===
- "What I Like About You"

=== Bonus track ===
The Walmart version of Poison'd! exclusively features the bonus track "SexyBack" originally performed by Justin Timberlake.

It was later released as a digital single in the iTunes Store.

=== Covers not included ===
The only Poison cover songs not included as bonus tracks are "Cover of the Rolling Stone" (Dr. Hook & the Medicine Show cover) from Crack a Smile...and More!, and "God Save the Queen", an instrumental Sex Pistols cover from the Open Up and Say... Ahh! sessions (which was released on the 20th anniversary edition of Flesh & Blood).

== Track listing ==
No.	Title	Writer(s)	Original artist (date)	Length
1.	"Little Willy"	Nicky Chinn; Mike Chapman	The Sweet (1973)	3:18
2.	"Suffragette City"	David Bowie	David Bowie (1972)	2:57
3.	"I Never Cry"	Alice Cooper; Dick Wagner	Alice Cooper (1976)	3:33
4.	"I Need to Know"	Tom Petty	Tom Petty and the Heartbreakers (1978)	2:21
5.	"Can't You See"	Toy Caldwell	The Marshall Tucker Band (1973)	4:57
6.	"What I Like About You"	Wally Palmar; Mike Skill; Jimmy Marinos	The Romantics (1980)	2:59
7.	"Dead Flowers"	Jagger–Richards	The Rolling Stones (1971)	4:21
8.	"Just What I Needed"	Ric Ocasek	The Cars (1978)	3:36
9.	"Rock and Roll All Nite"	Paul Stanley; Gene Simmons	Kiss (1975)	3:35
10.	"Squeeze Box"	Pete Townshend	The Who (1975)	2:30
11.	"You Don’t Mess Around with Jim"	Jim Croce	Jim Croce (1972)	3:06
12.	"Your Mama Don't Dance"	Kenny Loggins; Jim Messina	Loggins and Messina (1972)	3:01
13.	"We're an American Band"	Don Brewer	Grand Funk Railroad (1973)	3:09
Total length:				43:28

Walmart bonus track
No.	Title	Writer(s)	Original artist (date)	Length
14.	"SexyBack"	Justin Timberlake; Timothy Mosley; Nate Hills	Justin Timberlake (2006)	3:25
Total length:				46:48

== Personnel ==
=== Poison ===
- Bret Michaels – lead vocals,
- C.C. DeVille – lead guitar, backing vocals
- Bobby Dall – bass, backing vocals
- Rikki Rockett – drums, backing vocals

=== Additional musicians ===
- Jim McGorman – keyboards, backing vocals

== Producers ==
- Tracks 1–8 + 14: produced by Don Was – 2007 (new recordings)
- Track 9: produced by Rick Rubin, soundtrack of the film Less than Zero – 1987
- Track 10: produced by Thom Panunzio, Hollyweird – 2002
- Track 11: produced by Ric Browde – 1987; bonus track on Look What the Cat Dragged In: 20th Anniversary Edition – 2006
- Track 12: produced by Tom Werman, Open Up and Say... Ahh! – 1988
- Track 13: produced by Don Was, The Best of Poison: 20 Years of Rock – 2006

== Charts ==
Chart (2007)	Peak position
US Billboard 200	32
US Top Rock Albums (Billboard)	12
