= Life Goes On (Poison song) =

Single by Poison

from the album Flesh & Blood
- B-side: "Something to Believe In (Acoustic/Unmixed Version)"
- Released: April 1991
- Recorded: 1990
- Genre: Glam metal; hard rock
- Length: 4:46
- Label: Capitol
- Songwriters: Bret Michaels; Bobby Dall; Rikki Rockett; C.C. DeVille
- Producer: Bruce Fairbairn

Poison singles chronology
| "Ride the Wind" (1991) | "Life Goes On" (1991) | "(Flesh & Blood) Sacrifice" (1991) |

Music videos
- "Life Goes On" on YouTube

"Life Goes On" is a song by American glam metal band Poison. The power ballad was the fourth single from their 1990 album Flesh & Blood. The song reached number 35 on the Billboard Hot 100.

== Song history ==
C.C. DeVille originally brought the song to the band, where Rikki Rockett and Bobby Dall added their input. The lyrics were written after a girlfriend of DeVille's was shot and killed in a bar fight in Palm Springs, California. The song is about trying to find the light at the end of the tunnel.

== Albums ==
"Life Goes On" is on the following albums.

- Flesh & Blood
- Poison's Greatest Hits: 1986-1996
- Best of Ballads & Blues
- The Best of Poison: 20 Years of Rock
- Flesh & Blood - 20th Anniversary Edition
- Poison – Box Set (Collector's Edition)
- Double Dose: Ultimate Hits

== Chart performance ==
| Chart (1991) | Peak position |
|---|---|
| US Billboard Hot 100 | 35 |
| US Radio Songs (Billboard) | 73 |
