= Fallen Angel (Poison song) =

Single by Poison

from the album Open Up and Say... Ahh!
- B-side: "Bad to Be Good"
- Released: July 6, 1988
- Recorded: 1988
- Studio: Conway (Hollywood, California)
- Genre: Glam metal
- Length: 3:56
- Label: Enigma; Capitol
- Songwriters: Bret Michaels; Bobby Dall; Rikki Rockett; C.C. DeVille
- Producer: Tom Werman

Poison singles chronology
"Nothin' But a Good Time" (1988)	"Fallen Angel" (1988)	"Every Rose Has Its Thorn" (1988)

Music videos
- "Fallen Angel" on YouTube

"Fallen Angel" is a song by American glam metal band Poison, released in 1988 as the second single from the band's second studio album Open Up and Say... Ahh!. The B-side of the seven-inch was "Bad to Be Good". "Fallen Angel" reached No. 12 on the Billboard Hot 100 and No. 32 on the Mainstream Rock chart and has since gone gold in the US. This made it the only single from the album not to reach the top ten. It also charted at number 21 on the Australian charts and number 59 on the UK Singles chart.

== Background ==
The song is about a young girl who grew up in a small town in Ohio and goes to Los Angeles to try to make it as an actress. While there, she abandons her old life.

This theme is a reference to the history of the band Poison itself: Bret Michaels, Bobby Dall and Rikki Rockett all left their native Pennsylvania for Los Angeles in their quest for fame.

Cash Box said that "once again the boys bash and thrash their way through a good tune about the small-town girl gone bad in the big city."

"Fallen Angel", along with "Talk Dirty to Me", "I Won't Forget You" and "Ride the Wind", was the subject of a lawsuit in 2011 by members of the defunct band Kid Rocker, who claimed that the songs were based on Kid Rocker songs played to Poison guitarist C.C. DeVille before he was a member of Poison. On April 8, 2013, a California federal judge said that the plaintiffs waited too long to file their lawsuit, stating, "It is totally implausible that plaintiff did not discover the alleged infringement until 2011." The judge ruled that the plaintiffs could only sue for damages dating back three years from the date of the lawsuit (following a three-year statute of limitations), and no more.

== Music video ==
The music video to "Fallen Angel" mostly follows the lyrics to the song, and was in heavy rotation on MTV. In the video, a young blonde (portrayed by model Susie Hatton, then Michaels' girlfriend) tells her family, at dinner, that she is leaving for California at the end of the week, a statement that surprises and silences them. She arrives in Los Angeles with a suitcase in tow, eventually catching the attention of a sleazy manager (played by Anthony James). She becomes a success as a lingerie model, but feels like she is selling out her morals for fame. She begins dating her manager, but when he starts getting friendly with other ladies at a club, she leaves. He tries to get her back, but the girl gives him a kick in the groin and walks off. She is back on the streets, but is picked up by Bret Michaels on a Harley-Davidson Softail on Hollywood Boulevard and rides off into an unknown future. As her story ends, another girl, played by Michelle Davis, arrives on the bus hoping to find fame and fortune.

Rikki Rockett's white tee-shirt was blurred in several scenes, as it contained the Vision Street Wear logo, a popular brand with skate-boarders; Rikki was an avid skate-boarder. Two other logos, one being on a store window and another being a bus logo were also blurred as well perhaps for product brand issues.

== Reception ==
"Fallen Angel" is widely regarded as one of Poison's best songs. In 2017, Billboard and OC Weekly each ranked the song number seven on their lists of the 10 greatest Poison songs.

== Albums ==
"Fallen Angel" is included on the following albums:

- Open Up and Say... Ahh!
- Swallow This Live (live version)
- Poison's Greatest Hits: 1986–1996
- Power to the People (live version)
- Show Me Your Hits – (Alternate version)
- The Best of Poison: 20 Years of Rock
- Open Up and Say... Ahh! – 20th Anniversary Edition
- Live, Raw & Uncut (live version)

== Charts ==
=== Weekly charts ===
Weekly chart performance for "Fallen Angel"
Chart (1988)	Peak position
Australia (ARIA)	21
Canada Top Singles (RPM)	55
New Zealand (Recorded Music NZ)	32
UK Singles (Official Charts)	59
US Billboard Hot 100	12
US Mainstream Rock (Billboard)	32

=== Year-end charts ===
Annual chart rankings for "Fallen Angel"
Chart (1988)	Rank
Tokyo (Tokio Hot 100)	90
