= The Last Song (Poison song) =

Single by Poison

from the album Power to the People
- B-side: "Strange"
- Released: July 2000
- Recorded: 2000
- Genre: Glam metal
- Label: Cyanide Records
- Songwriters: Michaels; DeVille; Dall; Rockett
- Producers: Richie Zito, Bret Michaels

Poison singles chronology
"Power to the People" (2000)	"The Last Song" (2000)	"Rockstar" (2001)

"The Last Song" is a power ballad by American hard rock band Poison. It was the second and final single from their 2000 album, Power to the People.

== Background ==
"The Last Song" was one of five new tracks on the half live half studio album, the others being "Power to the People" (first single), "Strange", Can't Bring Me Down" and for the first time on vocals C.C. DeVille sings the track "I Hate Every Bone In Your Body But Mine". The song was released as a single in July 2000 under the bands Cyanide Records.

== Live performance ==
The song has only been played three times by the band once on the "Power to the People" tour once on the "Glam, Slam, Metal, Jam" Tour and once on the "Hollyweird" tour.

== Lyrics ==
The lyrics describe lost love; it describes the narrators "last day" and "last song".

== Track listing ==
- Track 1 - "The Last Song"
- Track 2 - "Strange"

=== Strange ===
The B-side is the album track "Strange" which has been played live by the band a couple times on the Power to the People Tour in 2000.

== Albums ==
"The Last Song" is on the following albums.

- Power to the People
- Best of Ballads & Blues
- The Best of Poison: 20 Years of Rock

== Personnel ==
Credits are adapted from liner notes of "Power to the People".

- Bret Michaels - lead vocals, rhythm guitar, keyboards
- C.C. DeVille - lead guitar, backing vocals
- Bobby Dall - bass guitar, backing vocals
- Rikki Rockett - drums, backing vocals
