= Ride the Wind (song) =

Single by Poison

from the album Flesh and Blood
- Released: January 21, 1991
- Recorded: 1990
- Genre: Glam metal
- Length: 3:51
- Label: Capitol
- Songwriters: Bret Michaels; Bobby Dall; Rikki Rockett; C.C. DeVille
- Producer: Bruce Fairbairn

Poison singles chronology
"Something to Believe In" (1990)	"Ride the Wind" (1991)	"Life Goes On" (1991)

Music videos
- "Ride the Wind" on YouTube

"Ride the Wind" is a song by American glam metal band Poison. It was the third single from the group's 1990 studio album Flesh & Blood, released on Capitol.

== Background ==
The track is one of several that reflects the band's maturing songwriting. The lyrics are similar to those found in Western music.

"Ride the Wind" reached number 25 on the mainstream rock charts and the 38 position on the Billboard Hot 100.

== Lyrics ==
The song's lyrics are about being free, and focuses on the lifestyle of American bikers. It's also meant to represent the urge for adventure. It also features themes of rebellion and resilience.

== Music video ==
The music video for the song consists of footage from the Poison's Flesh & Blood tour. It features sequences of the band performing onstage, as well as backstage scenes and shots of the audiences (especially of female fans). Majority of the footage was Filmed at Freedom Hall in Louisville KY on December 1st 1990 and the Former Joe Louis Arena in Detroit MI on December 2nd 1990.

== Albums ==
"Ride the Wind" appears on the following albums:

- Flesh & Blood
- Swallow This Live (live version)
- Seven Days Live (live version)
- Poison's Greatest Hits: 1986-1996
- The Best of Poison: 20 Years of Rock
- Flesh & Blood - 20th Anniversary Edition
- Live, Raw & Uncut CD
- Poison – Box Set (Collector's Edition)
- Double Dose: Ultimate Hits

== Charts ==
Chart (1991)	Peak position
Australia (ARIA)	113
Canada Top Singles (RPM)	31
US Billboard Hot 100	38
US Mainstream Rock (Billboard)	25
