= Nothin' But a Good Time =

Single by Poison

from the album Open Up and Say... Ahh!
- B-side: "Look But You Cant Touch; Livin' For The Minute (UK 1989 re-release)"
- Released: April 6, 1988
- Recorded: 1987
- Studio: Conway (Hollywood, California)
- Genre: Glam metal
- Length: 3:43
- Label: Enigma; Capitol
- Songwriters: Bret Michaels; Bobby Dall; Rikki Rockett; C.C. DeVille
- Producer: Tom Werman

Poison singles chronology
"Rock and Roll All Nite" (1987)	"Nothin' But a Good Time" (1988)	"Fallen Angel" (1988)

Music videos
- "Nothin' But a Good Time" on YouTube

"Nothin' But a Good Time" (also known as "Nothing But a Good Time") the first single from the hard rock/glam metal group Poison's second studio album Open Up and Say... Ahh!, with the band releasing that album in May 1988. B-sides "Livin' for the Minute" and "Look But You Can't Touch" were included in the single's release.

The song was released as a single in 1988 on Enigma Records and reached #6 on the Billboard Hot 100 and #19 on the Mainstream rock charts. It also charted at number 10 on the Australian charts and number 35 on the UK Singles chart.

In 2015, "Sleazegrinder" of Louder included the song in his list of "The 20 Greatest Hair Metal Anthems Of All Time", placing it at number four.

== Music video ==
The music video features a restaurant employee, played by the same actor who appeared in the video for Mötley Crüe's "You're All I Need", washing dishes while listening to Poison's 1987 cover of the Kiss hit single "Rock and Roll All Nite" (recorded for the Less than Zero soundtrack). The manager enters, turns off the radio, and scathingly chastises the employee that he is being paid "to wash dishes, not to listen to that... that rock 'n' roll," and accusing him of "moving in two speeds: slow, and stop." After threatening to fire the employee if he didn’t hurry up, the manager exits, whereupon the employee turns the radio back on, then he abandons the dishes and kicks open a nearby door to reveal a concert hall stage, upon which the band then performs the song. When the song is over, the manager returns, discovering, to his surprise, that the dishes are covered in tinsel. It was played in heavy rotation on MTV in 1988.

== Reception and legacy ==
"Nothin' But a Good Time" is widely regarded as one of Poison's best songs. In 2017, Billboard and OC Weekly ranked the song number nine and number four, respectively, on their lists of the ten greatest Poison tracks. Music critic Steve Huey of Allmusic has also stated that "Nothin' But a Good Time" became one of the bands "most widely recognized signature songs" as well as that parent album Open Up and Say... Ahh! wound up having "solidified the group's status as hair metal's top party band."

== TV appearances ==
A 2007 Xbox commercial featured a cover version by a school choir.

"Nothin' But a Good Time" was performed by Poison, with the cast of Rock of Ages, at the 63rd Tony Awards on June 7, 2009. After the performance, as the band made their way backstage, a piece of the stage scenery collapsed on Bret Michaels.

It appears in a 2017 TV commercial for Nissan's Heisman House and ESPN, featuring Eddie George and other Heisman Trophy winners.

It also appears in a 2022 Direct Line television advert featuring Tessa Thompson in character as Valkyrie (Marvel Comics).

It has become popular to use in numerous shows and movies, including as Regular Show, Cobra Kai, and Off Campus.

== Albums ==
"Nothin' But a Good Time" is on the following albums:

- Open Up and Say... Ahh!
- Swallow This Live (live version)
- Poison's Greatest Hits: 1986–1996
- Power to the People (live version)
- Show Me Your Hits (Alternate version)
- The Best of Poison: 20 Years of Rock
- Jammin' with Friends (feat. Ace Frehley, Michael Anthony) – 2 versions released as a singles

== Charts ==
=== Weekly charts ===
Chart (1988–1989)	Peak position
Australia (ARIA)	10
Canada Top Singles (RPM)	26
UK Singles (Official Charts)	35
US Billboard Hot 100	6
US Mainstream Rock (Billboard)	19

=== Year-end charts ===
Chart (1988)	Peak position
Australia (ARIA)	49
US Billboard Hot 100	98

== Cover versions ==
Reel Big Fish covered the song on their 2009 album Fame, Fortune and Fornication.

The song was used in the movie The Rocker where it was covered by the fictional band A.D.D. The actual recording was mostly done by Chad Fischer with Teddy Geiger singing lead vocals. This version was released on the film's soundtrack album.

Adam Brand and the Outlaws covered the song on the 2016 album Adam Brand and the Outlaws.

== Appearances in other media ==
- A cover of the song is featured in the game Guitar Hero Encore: Rocks the 80s (erroneously credited as "Ain't Nothin' But a Good Time"), while the master track is featured in Guitar Hero: Smash Hits (this time correctly credited) and was featured as a downloadable track for the Rock Band series.
- The NHL's Washington Capitals play this song after every home victory.
- In The Simpsons season 11 episode "It's a Mad, Mad, Mad, Mad Marge", Otto hires a Poison tribute band called Cyanide to play this song at his wedding. However, the band can only play the intro before Otto's fiancé, Becky, stops them.
- The song is featured in the trailers for the 2008 film Zack and Miri Make a Porno and Balls of Fury and the teaser trailer for the film Grown Ups 2.
- Professional wrestling tag team Dunn & Marcos, The Ring Crew Express, used the song as their entrance theme while in Ring of Honor.
- The song is played in the 2010 film Yogi Bear when Yogi performs his water skiing at Jellystone Park's 100th Anniversary celebration.
- This song is played in the Cartoon Network animated series Regular Show in episode "My Mom" of season 2.
- The song is combined with "Sister Christian" by Night Ranger and "Just Like Paradise" by David Lee Roth in the 2012 film adaptation of Rock of Ages.
- "Nothin' But a Good Time" is available since October 14, 2014, as a purchasable and downloadable song for the music video game Rocksmith 2014, featuring guitar and bass parts as well as authentic tones.
- This song is played in the pilot of the Karate Kid sequel series Cobra Kai "Ace Degenerate".
- The first episode of Dexter: Original Sin uses this song to commemorate the title character's first kill.
