= Poison (band) =

American rock band

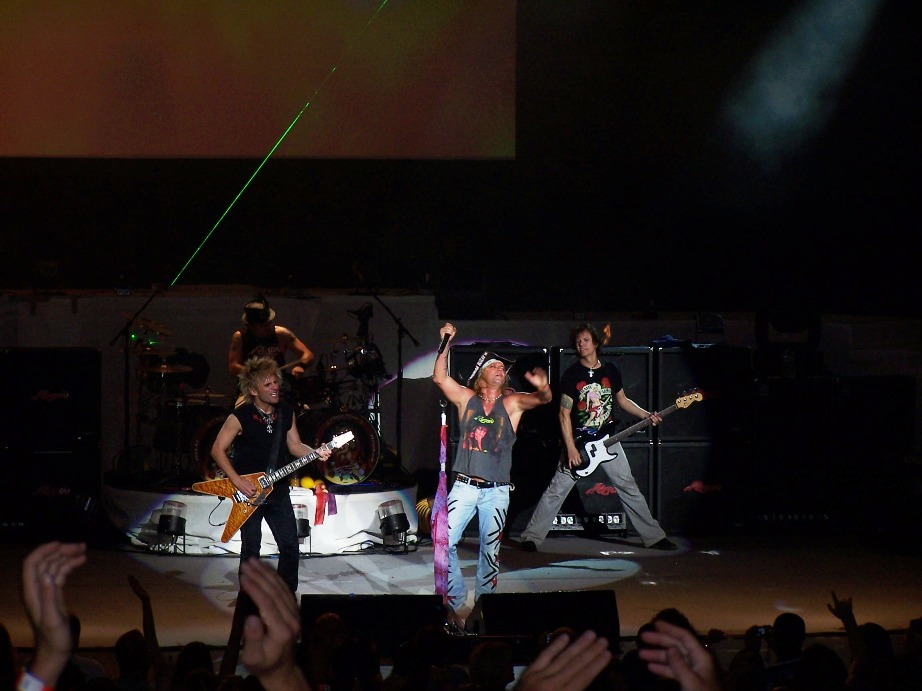
- Poison performing in 2006

Background information
- Also known as: Paris (1980–1983)
- Origin: Mechanicsburg, Pennsylvania, U.S.
- Genres: Glam metal; hard rock; heavy metal
- Works: Discography
- Years active: 1983–2012, 2017–2023
- Labels: Enigma; EMI; Capitol; Cyanide
- Spinoffs: Samantha 7
- Past members: Bret Michaels; Rikki Rockett; Bobby Dall; Matt Smith; C.C. DeVille; Richie Kotzen; Blues Saraceno
- Website: poisonofficial.com

Poison was an American rock band formed in Mechanicsburg, Pennsylvania in 1983. The most successful incarnation of the band consists of lead singer and rhythm guitarist Bret Michaels, drummer Rikki Rockett, bassist Bobby Dall and lead guitarist C.C. DeVille. The band achieved huge commercial success in the mid-1980s through the mid-1990s and sold over 65 million records and DVDs worldwide. In 2012, VH1 ranked them at No. 1 on their list of the "Top 5 Hair Bands of the '80s".

The band had a Billboard Hot 100 number one hit single with "Every Rose Has Its Thorn" and other top 40 hit singles in the 1980s and 1990s, including "Talk Dirty to Me", "I Won't Forget You", "Nothin' But a Good Time", "Fallen Angel", "Your Mama Don't Dance", "Unskinny Bop", "Something to Believe In", "Ride the Wind", and "Life Goes On". The band's breakthrough debut album, the multi-platinum Look What the Cat Dragged In, was released in 1986, followed by Open Up and Say... Ahh!, which was certified 5× platinum in the US. Their third consecutive multi-platinum album was Flesh & Blood, which became their best-selling release. In the 1990s, following the release of the band's first live album, Swallow This Live, the band experienced some lineup changes and the fall of glam metal with the grunge movement, but the band's fourth studio album, Native Tongue, still achieved Gold status and the band's first compilation album, Poison's Greatest Hits: 1986–1996, went double platinum.

The original lineup reformed for a greatest hits reunion tour in 1999. The band began the 2000s with the release of Crack a Smile... and More!, followed by the Power to the People album. They released the album, Hollyweird, in 2002 and in 2006 the band celebrated their twenty year anniversary with The Best of Poison: 20 Years of Rock tour and album, which was certified Gold and marked Poison's return to the Billboard top 20 charts for the first time since 1993. Band members have released several solo albums and starred in reality TV shows. Since their debut in 1986, they have released seven studio albums, four live albums, five compilation albums, and have issued 28 singles to radio.

Poison is considered by some to be among the best glam metal acts of all time. In 2025, Ultimate Classic Rock said Poison was among the "Big Four" of glam metal, along with Mötley Crüe, Bon Jovi and Def Leppard.

== History ==
=== Early years (1983–1985) ===
Poison, initially named Paris, was formed in 1983, in Mechanicsburg, Pennsylvania, and consisted of lead vocalist Bret Michaels, bassist Bobby Dall, drummer Rikki Rockett and lead guitarist Matt Smith.

Michaels began his performing career with a basement band called Laser and, then, in 1979, joined longtime childhood friend Rockett to form a band called the Spectres. In 1980, Michaels and Rockett teamed up with Smith and Dall to form the band Paris and the group started playing the club circuit, performing mostly rock cover songs in local bars. According to Vicky Hamilton, Poison's first manager, the band's sound at this time revolved around guitarist Smith, who was by far the best musician in the group. While Smith was responsible for music, Rockett and Michaels focused on the band's stage show and image.

Paris formed a strong local following in Pennsylvania but saw little opportunity of larger success there, and the decision was made to move to Los Angeles. In March 1983, Paris changed their name to Poison and headed west to California.

=== Arrival of DeVille ===
Now based in Los Angeles, Poison's stage show began to earn them considerable attention on the West Hollywood Sunset Strip club circuit. The band lived together in a small apartment on Orange St. in Hollywood, and many local female fans began bringing them bags of groceries and cleaning the apartment in exchange for the opportunity to spend time with the band members. The Pennsylvania natives endured culture shock upon settling in Hollywood; "The first week we're seeing people get their asses kicked out front. I remember this pimp was literally smacking the hell out of his ho across the street", Rockett recalled of Poison's early days on the Sunset Strip. That same pimp would later pull a large knife on the band when they decided to intervene, and they learned quickly not to get involved in such matters. Hamilton, who had previously represented Stryper and who would go on to discover Guns N' Roses, negotiated a deal with influential club The Troubadour which would provide the band with a regular gig and allow them to further develop their image and stage show. They recorded demos for Atlantic Records but ultimately the label passed on the band. By 1985, guitarist Smith was rapidly becoming disillusioned with Poison, as he was about to become a father and was growing doubtful of the band's chances of success. He subsequently left the band and returned home to Pennsylvania, leaving Poison's future very much in doubt.

The band auditioned several guitarists in Los Angeles and eventually narrowed the field down to two candidates, Slash and C.C. DeVille. The band knew Slash from the band Hollywood Rose, of which he was a member before joining Guns N' Roses, but the band was hoping to find an East Coast guitarist. DeVille recently turned down an offer to join Christian rockers Stryper (according to Michael Sweet, he said "I'm more into pink and purple" when told "everything's gotta be yellow and black"), and although the rest of Poison were duly impressed with his playing and image, they did not care for his brash New York personality. DeVille reportedly dismissed the material written by the band, which he had been asked to learn for the audition, and clashed with Poison over which songs would encompass the audition. Michaels and Dall, in particular, disliked the guitarist on a personal level and had strong misgivings about hiring him. Ultimately, despite their apprehension, the band decided that DeVille's talent and drive to succeed made him the best choice. The band's desire to replace Smith with another East Coast guitarist fueled the move to hire DeVille over Slash. The band also saw hit single potential in the song DeVille brought with him to the audition, "Talk Dirty to Me", a song from his previous group The Screaming Mimis.

=== Look What the Cat Dragged In and Open Up and Say... Ahh! (1986–1989) ===
Unable to secure a major label recording contract, Poison was signed by Steev Riccardo with the smaller Enigma Records in 1986 (see 1986 in music) for approximately $30,000, a fraction of the hundreds of thousands of dollars many similar acts were receiving from major labels at the time. Their debut album, Look What the Cat Dragged In, was released on May 23, 1986, with the band members themselves partially funding the recording. The album was initially expected to produce only one single, "Cry Tough"; however, Look What the Cat Dragged In became a surprise success and subsequently spawned three charting hits: "Talk Dirty to Me", "I Want Action", and "I Won't Forget You", The record became the biggest-selling-album in Enigma's history. With heavy rotation on MTV, their debut earned the band tours with fellow glam rockers Ratt, Cinderella, and Quiet Riot, as well as a coveted slot in the Texxas Jam in Dallas. In 1987 the band recorded a cover of the Kiss song "Rock and Roll All Nite" for the soundtrack to Less than Zero.

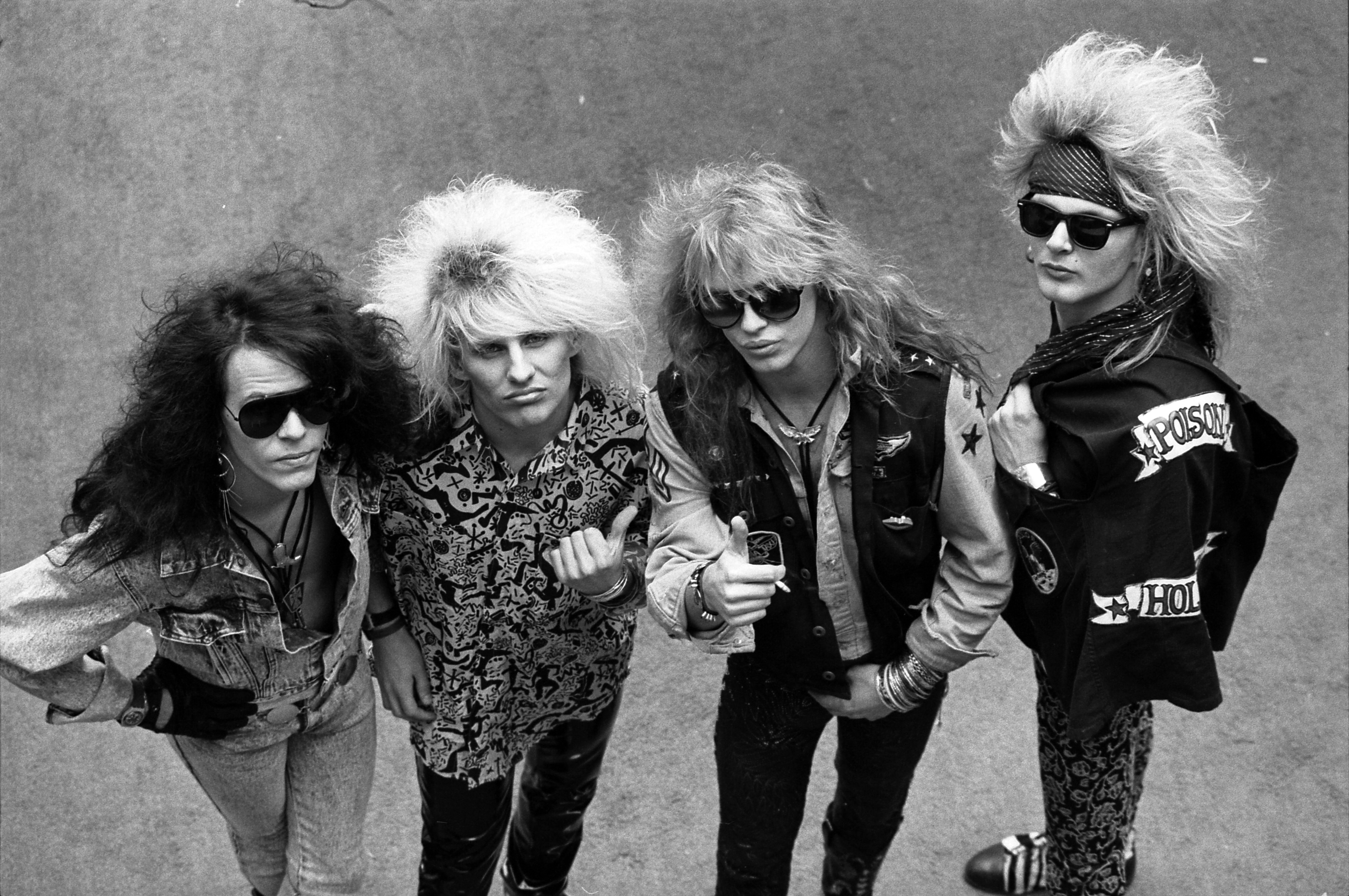
Poison in 1987

Poison's second album, Open Up and Say... Ahh!, was released May 21, 1988. It peaked at No. 2 on the American charts. The album included the band's biggest hit, the No. 1 single "Every Rose Has Its Thorn", along with other hits "Nothin' but a Good Time", "Fallen Angel", and the Loggins and Messina cover "Your Mama Don't Dance". The album's initial cover art was controversial, as it depicted a demonic female figure with an obscenely long tongue. A censored version of the cover followed, focusing on the figure's eyes. In 1989, the band released their first video album titled Sight for Sore Ears which featured all their music videos from the first two albums.

Conflict pursued the band persistently. Michaels' frequent brawling garnered him further lawsuits in Atlanta, Los Angeles and Tallahassee. Bryn Bridenthal, head of publicity at Geffen Records, filed a $1.1 million lawsuit against the band for drenching her with drinks and a bucket of ice at a music industry party. Then, Sanctuary Music, Poison's former management company, filed a $45.5 million breach of contract suit against the band. Poison retaliated with charges of mismanagement of funds. Easy Action filed a lawsuit, claiming that Poison stole the chorus of their song "We Go Rocking" for their single "I Want Action". As recalled by Easy Action's lead vocalist Tommy Nilsson in an interview with Rock United, they received an unspecified financial settlement for the alleged plagiarism in 1989. DeVille put the amount at $25,000 in a 1994 radio interview with Lonn Friend.

=== Flesh & Blood and Swallow This Live (1990–1992) ===
Poison continued their adherence to the "work hard, play hard" motto, following up with their third album, Flesh & Blood, which was released June 21, 1990. It also was highly successful, being certified 3× Platinum in the U.S. and 4× Platinum in Canada. The album's success prompted the impetus for a further world tour. The album also features an alternative cover, as the original featured what appeared to be running ink or possibly blood from a tattoo. The record went multi-platinum, spawning two gold singles: "Unskinny Bop" and the ballad "Something To Believe In" which was dedicated to the band's security guard and close friend James Kimo Maano who had died. "Ride the Wind" and "Life Goes On" were the other single releases that charted, the last single released was the title cut, "Flesh & Blood (Sacrifice)".

Poison received a letter from Secretary of Defense Dick Cheney thanking the band for contributing 20,000 CDs of the album Flesh & Blood to lift the morale of U.S. Troops during Desert Storm, and their continued support of the Armed Forces.

One of the band's few appearances in the UK was on August 18, 1990, at Donington's Monsters of Rock festival in the summer of 1990. Whitesnake and Aerosmith headlined with Poison, Quireboys and Thunder supporting them. This event was broadcast on BBC Radio 1.

After two consecutive years on the road, band members were at each other's throats with personal differences and drug addictions; things came to a head at the 1991 MTV Video Music Awards where Poison was meant to perform "Unskinny Bop", but an inebriated DeVille started into "Talk Dirty to Me" instead, with his guitar out of tune, eventually stepping on his guitar cable and unplugging it mid-song. Michaels and DeVille then got into a fist fight backstage, and DeVille left the band shortly afterwards.

Poison recorded several performances during its 1990/1991 Flesh & Blood world tour, which were released in November 1991 as the band's fourth album, Swallow This Live. The double album features live tracks from Poison's first three studio albums and four new studio tracks including the single "So Tell Me Why", which were the last recorded before C.C. DeVille's departure from the band later that year.

=== Native Tongue, Greatest Hits and Crack a Smile (1993–2000) ===
DeVille was fired and replaced by guitarist Richie Kotzen. Poison's fourth album, Native Tongue, was released February 8, 1993. It was strongly influenced by Kotzen's fresh songwriting contributions and guitar performance. It marked a change for the band as they abandoned their anthemic party tunes to focus on more serious subjects, and was far more blues-rock oriented than glam metal. Containing the singles "Stand" which featured the Los Angeles First A.M.E. Church Choir on backing vocals, "Until You Suffer Some (Fire And Ice)" and "Body Talk", the album received generally positive reviews and did go Gold, but following the arrival of grunge, sales were sluggish compared with the first three albums. The band toured in support of the album, but tensions mounted between Kotzen and the rest of the band. Kotzen's future in the band was doomed when it was discovered that he had become romantically involved with Rockett's then-fiancée Deanna Eve. Kotzen was promptly fired, and replaced by Blues Saraceno in November 1993, who completed the world tour with the band including the famous "Hollywood Rock" concerts in Rio de Janeiro and São Paulo, Brazil, where they played to over 165,000 people.

Poison began recording its sixth album, Crack a Smile, in early 1994. Recording was brought to an abrupt halt in May 1994, when Michaels was involved in a car accident where he lost control of his Ferrari. Michaels suffered a broken nose, ribs, jaw, and fingers and lost four teeth. After his recovery in 1995, the band continued recording the album. The album became shelved shortly after this, with no release date anywhere in sight. Instead, the label opted for a Greatest Hits compilation, which featured two new tracks with Saraceno on guitar, "Sexual Thing" and "Lay Your Body Down". The first Greatest Hits album was released on November 26, 1996, and sold extremely well, going on to reach double platinum status.

After several years apart, Michaels and DeVille were able to patch up their differences; and Michaels welcomed DeVille back into Poison in 1996 to replace Saraceno.

Michaels was involved with Pamela Anderson. After Poison's and Michaels' longtime attorney, Ed McPherson, obtained a Federal injunction prohibiting the distribution of an explicit sex tape that the couple made, an abridged version of the tape appeared on the internet in 1998.

Michaels and actor friend Charlie Sheen co-founded a production company called Sheen Michaels Entertainment. In 1998, Michaels made his acting debut alongside Charlie and Martin Sheen in the movie A Letter from Death Row, which was also written and directed by Michaels.

The Greatest Hits reunion tour took place in the summer of 1999, with the original lineup. The show at Pine Knob Amphitheater in metro Detroit drew a sell-out crowd of 18,000, and other shows averaged crowds of 12,000. In addition, the band appeared on VH1's Behind the Music. On March 14, 2000, Crack a Smile...and More! was finally released, with the single "Shut Up, Make Love" and power ballad "Be the One". In addition to the outtakes, live recordings from the 1990 installment of the MTV Unplugged series were included.

=== Power to the People and Hollyweird (2001–2002) ===
After the Poison reunion DeVille soon released his solo album, Samantha 7, and Michaels released the solo/Poison album Show Me Your Hits which featured re-recorded Poison classics. The album featured Michaels performing Poison hits in a new way and also featured other artists with Michaels on selected tracks. Poison also released Power to the People, their first album with DeVille in nine years. The record contained five new studio songs: "Power to the People" which features a music video, "Can't Bring Me Down", "The Last Song", "Strange", and "I Hate Every Bone In Your Body But Mine", the latter with DeVille on lead vocals for the first time.

In May 2001 Poison released the web single "Rockstar" as a preview of the upcoming new album and went on tour with Warrant.

Poison's sixth full studio album, Hollyweird, was released on May 21, 2002. It was Poison's first full album of new material with DeVille back in the band. The album was heavily criticized by both critics and fans, feeling it had poor production quality and an unimpressive new sound. One popular site said "It's muddy, under-produced, badly mixed and features crappy drum and guitar sounds". Other reviewers were more impressed, such as AllMusic, who declared it "one of Poison's best records, if not their best". A cover of The Who song "Squeeze Box" was released as the second single from the album on April 2, 2002. The album's third and final single "Shooting Star" was released on November 5, 2002. is the band's most recent original song that has been released as a single.

=== Best of Ballads & Blues and The Best of Poison (2003–2006) ===
Following the Hollyweird world tour Poison released their second compilation album, Best of Ballads & Blues, in 2003. It contains a new acoustic version with new lyrics of "Something to Believe In" and a new acoustic version of "Stand". Michaels also released his second solo album, Songs of Life, which featured singles "Bittersweet" and "Raine" which featured a music video and was dedicated to his daughter. On January 7 that year, after almost 20 years with Poison, Rockett released his first solo album, Glitter 4 Your Soul, which was distributed online.

During the summer of 2004, Poison was invited to serve as the opening band on Kiss's "Rock the Nation" tour. Poison were largely inactive in 2005 which is when Michaels released his third solo album, the country-rock-influenced Freedom Of Sound, which included the single "All I Ever Needed" featuring Jessica Andrews, which also featured a music video and appeared on Billboard's "Hot Country Songs" chart, with its best position being number 45.

After a year off, Poison returned to the music scene. They celebrated their 20th anniversary with a "20 Years Of Rock" world tour in the summer of 2006, with fellow rockers Cinderella and Endeverafter opening. The tour swiftly became one of the most successful tours of 2006 in the U.S., averaging about 10,000 people per night. To complement it, the band had released an anniversary compilation album The Best Of Poison: 20 Years Of Rock, in April that year. The album also features a new single, a cover of Grand Funk Railroad's "We're An American Band", produced by Don Was and also features a music video. The compilation debuted at No. 17 with a first week sales total of 39,721, which marked Poison's return to the top 20 charts for the first time since 1993.

On August 1, 2006, Capitol Records released remastered versions of the first three Poison albums: Look What the Cat Dragged In, Open Up and Say... Ahh! and Flesh and Blood, in honor of Poison's 20th anniversary. All three include bonus tracks.

=== Poison'd! and Live, Raw & Uncut (2007–2009) ===
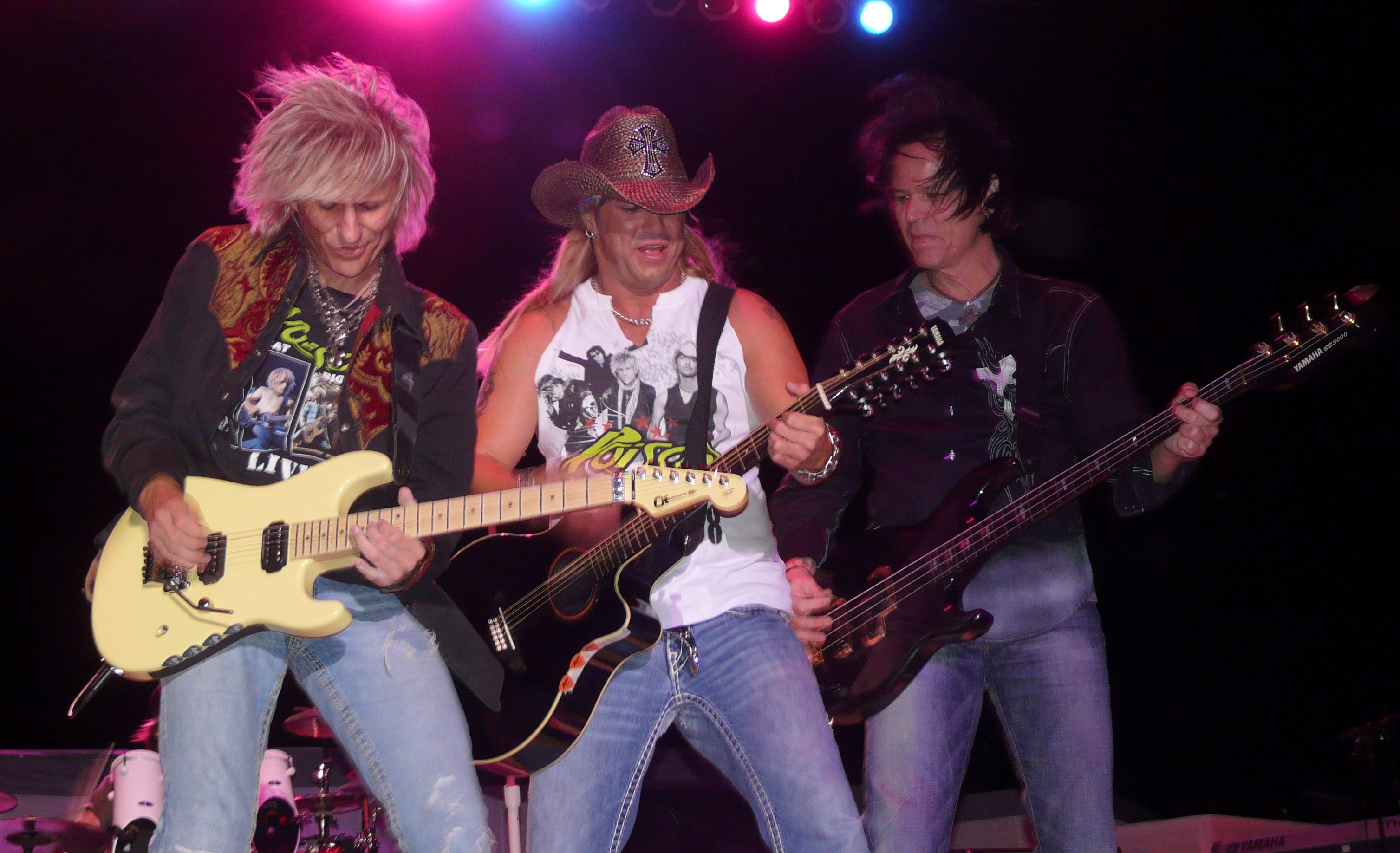
Poison performing in 2008

On January 3, 2007, Poison announced on their official MySpace page that they would like their fans to help pick favorite classic rock songs for the new studio album that they are to record. The fans replied with suggestions like Lynyrd Skynyrd's "Freebird", Sweet's "The Ballroom Blitz", and AC/DC's "You Shook Me All Night Long", along with Alice Cooper's "Poison".

During 2007, Poison went on a summer tour with Ratt. They released their covers album, now named Poison'd!, on June 5, 2007, through Capitol Records. The album entered the Billboard 200 chart at No. 32 and charted at No. 12 on the Top Rock Albums, selling 21,000 copies in its first week. The first single, "What I Like About You", featured a music video from the band. White Lion was removed from the tour due to legal issues, and Vains of Jenna took their place. The August 2 sold-out show in at the Verizon Wireless Amphitheatre St. Louis, Missouri was taped for a live concert DVD and for a HDNet Concert special called: Poison: Live, Raw & Uncut that aired on October 26, 2007, as part of Heavy Metal Halloween. The band also appeared that night on the channel's Sound Off with Matt Pinfield.

The band played at the Rock2Wgtn rock festival in Wellington, New Zealand, on the weekend of March 22–23, 2008. The festival also included fellow legendary rockers Kiss, Ozzy Osbourne, Alice Cooper, Whitesnake, and Finnish hard rock act Lordi.

Poison played at the Sweden Rock Festival 2008. The band then went on tour in the summer of 2008 with Sebastian Bach and Dokken.

Poison live in concert DVD titled Live, Raw & Uncut was released on July 15, 2008, which was filmed in St. Louis, during the Poison'd tour in 2007. This DVD/CD set was initially exclusive to Best Buy stores and includes behind-the-scenes footage as a bonus feature and as a live audio CD with selections from the concert. It sold around 2,400 copies in its first week of release to debut at position No. 8 on Billboard's Top Music Videos chart. Also in 2008 a live CD version of the Poison DVD Seven Days Live was released.

On June 7, 2009, Poison made a special appearance at the 63rd Tony Awards, performing "Nothin' But a Good Time" with the cast of Rock of Ages, which features "Nothin' But a Good Time" as a song in the show. As Michaels was exiting the stage, he was struck in the head by a descending set piece and knocked to the ground. He suffered a fractured nose and a split lip requiring three stitches.

=== Solo success, health issues and touring (2010–present) ===
In 2010, an unauthorized biography was released titled A Shot of Poison featuring a collection of tales from over twenty years with the band, based on the personal encounters of author, rock journalist and music industry insider Christopher Long.

On April 12, 2010, Michaels was rushed to the hospital after suffering intense stomach pains, and an emergency appendectomy was performed. On April 22, 2010, Michaels was again rushed to the hospital, this time with an "excruciating" headache. Doctors discovered that he had suffered a massive subarachnoid hemorrhage. He was in critical condition, and while some reports suggested that his condition had stabilized, others later stated that this was premature. On April 28, Michaels' representatives reported that he was conscious and speaking, albeit slowly, for the first time since he was hospitalized. In a news conference on May 5, 2010, Dr. Joseph Zabramski said Michaels has been released from the hospital and that "He's just one of those lucky people" and that "he'll make a complete recovery".

In the same year, Michaels released his third solo album, Custom Built. Half of the new album was enriched with previously released solo material. The lead-off single Nothing to Lose features pop singer Miley Cyrus and was the most added song to radio in the week of its release. Custom Built received mixed to negative reviews and it peaked at number 14 on the U.S. Billboard 200, topping both the Independent Albums and Hard Rock Albums. This marks the highest US chart entries by a member of Poison since Flesh & Blood in 1990.

On March 1, Poison announced a 2011 Summer tour with Mötley Crüe and New York Dolls to celebrate their band anniversaries named the Glam-A-Geddon 25/30/40. Also for Poison's 25th anniversary, a double CD named Double Dose: Ultimate Hits consisting exclusively of songs distributed by Capitol/EMI was released May 3, 2011. The compilation charted at No. 17 in Canada.

In 2012, Poison and Def Leppard performed at the Rock of Ages tour named after their 1983 song and after the 2012 motion picture of the same name, where the songs of both bands played a central role. Michaels also resumed his "Get Your Rock On" solo tour, named after his then latest single.

After completing the Rock of Ages tour, the bandmembers went their separate ways. Joint projects did not go beyond their announcements. Michaels continued touring and played almost exclusively Poison's single releases with his solo band. He released Jammin' with Friends featuring re-recorded alternate versions of Poison and Michaels solo tracks on June 25, 2013, peaking at No. 80 on the Billboard 200. In June 2014, Rockett co-founded the band Devil City Angels. DeVille, Dall and Rockett performed together without Michaels as a live band dubbed The Special Guests in the summer of 2015. Brandon Gibbs accompanied them on vocals. At the end of 2015, drummer Rockett was diagnosed with oral cavity cancer, and joint projects had to be put on hold because of the necessary treatment.

In 2017, Poison went on a co-headlining a tour with Def Leppard and special guest Tesla throughout the spring and summer and coincided with limited headline acts throughout the US and Canada celebrating their recent 30-year anniversary. The Nothing But a Good Time Tour with opening acts Cheap Trick and Pop Evil started May 18 and ended July 1 of the following year.

In 2019 Michaels announced his autobiography to be released in 2020 titled Unbroken: My life in Pictures & Stories to coincide with his single release "Unbroken". It was initially set to be titled Roses & Thorns when Michaels first started working on the project and was set to be released in 2010, but kept being pushed back to include more content. In May 2020 Bret Michaels: Auto-Scrap-ography Volume 1: My Life in Pictures & Stories has been released as the first in a series of trilogies.

Poison toured North America as an opening act for Mötley Crüe and Def Leppard with Joan Jett for The Stadium Tour from June 16 to September 9, 2022. The tour was originally scheduled for the summer of 2020 but was delayed due to the COVID-19 pandemic. During the tour, Michaels expressed doubt that the band would record another album, citing that he didn't believe that they could write and record another song that evoked their hits from their heyday.

== Musical style and fashion ==
Poison were glam metal, and their typical lyrical themes included partying. The band was also known for writing sentimental ballads. Ultimate Classic Rock said the band's early albums "epitomize the young, dumb, carefree attitude of the hair metal era." The band was not known for being as technically proficient in comparison to some of its peers. Bassist Bobby Dall stated in an episode of the television series Behind The Music that he "never aspired to be a musician" and instead "wanted to be a rock and roll star, and that's what [he] became."

Poison was known for its androgynous physical appearance. Ultimate Classic Rock said that "if somebody not intimately familiar with hair metal was asked to describe one of its bands, that imaginary group would probably look exactly like Poison." The site added that the band's excessive use of cosmetics "would make pageant queens blush." The band members also backcombed their hair. AllMusic described this as a "highly visual approach to rock & roll."

== Band members ==
=== Most recent lineup ===
- Bret Michaels – lead vocals, rhythm guitar, harmonica (1983–2012, 2017–2023)
- Rikki Rockett – drums, percussion, backing vocals (1983–2012, 2017–2023)
- Bobby Dall – bass, piano, backing vocals (1983–2012, 2017–2023)
- C.C. DeVille – lead guitar, backing and occasional lead vocals (1985–1991, 1996–2012, 2017–2023)

=== Former ===
- Matt Smith – lead guitar, backing vocals (1983–1985)
- Richie Kotzen – lead guitar, keyboards, piano, mandolin, dobro, backing vocals (1991–1993)
- Blues Saraceno – lead guitar, keyboards, piano, backing vocals (1993–1996)

=== Touring ===
- Mark Konrad – additional keyboards (1990–1991)
- Jesse Bradman – keyboards, piano, backing vocals (1993–1994)
- Will Doughty – keyboards, piano, backing vocals (2007–2012, 2017–2023)

== Discography ==
Studio albums

- Look What the Cat Dragged In (1986)
- Open Up and Say... Ahh! (1988)
- Flesh & Blood (1990)
- Native Tongue (1993)
- Crack a Smile... and More! (2000) (original promotional release date was April 22, 1996)
- Hollyweird (2002)
- Poison'd! (2007)

== Tours ==
- Look What the Cat Dragged In Tour (1986–1987)
- Open Up and Say Ahh! Tour (1988–1989)
- Nothing but a Good Time Down Under Tour (1989)
- Flesh & Blood World Tour (1990–1991)
- Native Tongue World Tour (1993–1994)
- Greatest Hits Reunion Tour (1999)
- Power to the People Tour (2000)
- Glam, Slam, Metal, Jam Tour (2001)
- Hollyweird World Tour (2002)
- Harder, Louder, Faster Tour (2003)
- Rock the Nation World Tour (2004)
- 20 Years of Rock World Tour (2006)
- POISON'D Summer Tour (2007)
- Live, Raw & Uncut Summer Tour (2008)
- 42-city Summer Tour (2009)
- Glam-A-Geddon Tour (2011)
- Rock of Ages Tour (2012)
- 30th Anniversary North American Comeback Tour (2017)
- Nothing But a Good Time Tour (2018)
- The Stadium Tour (2022)

== Awards and nominations ==
American Music Awards

Year	Nominated work	Award	Result
1991	Poison	Favorite Heavy Metal/Hard Rock Artist	Nominated
1991	Flesh & Blood	Favorite Heavy Metal/Hard Rock Album	Nominated

Metal Edge Readers' Choice Awards

Year	Winner	Category
1988	Open Up and Say... Ahh!	Album of the Year
1990	Flesh & Blood	Album of the Year
1990	"Something to Believe In"	Song of the Year
1990	"Something to Believe In"	Best Video
1990	C.C. DeVille	Best Guitarist
1990	Bret Michaels	Best Vocalist
1990	Bret Michaels	Best Male Performer
1990	Bret Michaels	Sexiest Male
1999	Poison	Comeback of the Year
