= Your Mama Don't Dance =

1972 single by Loggins and Messina

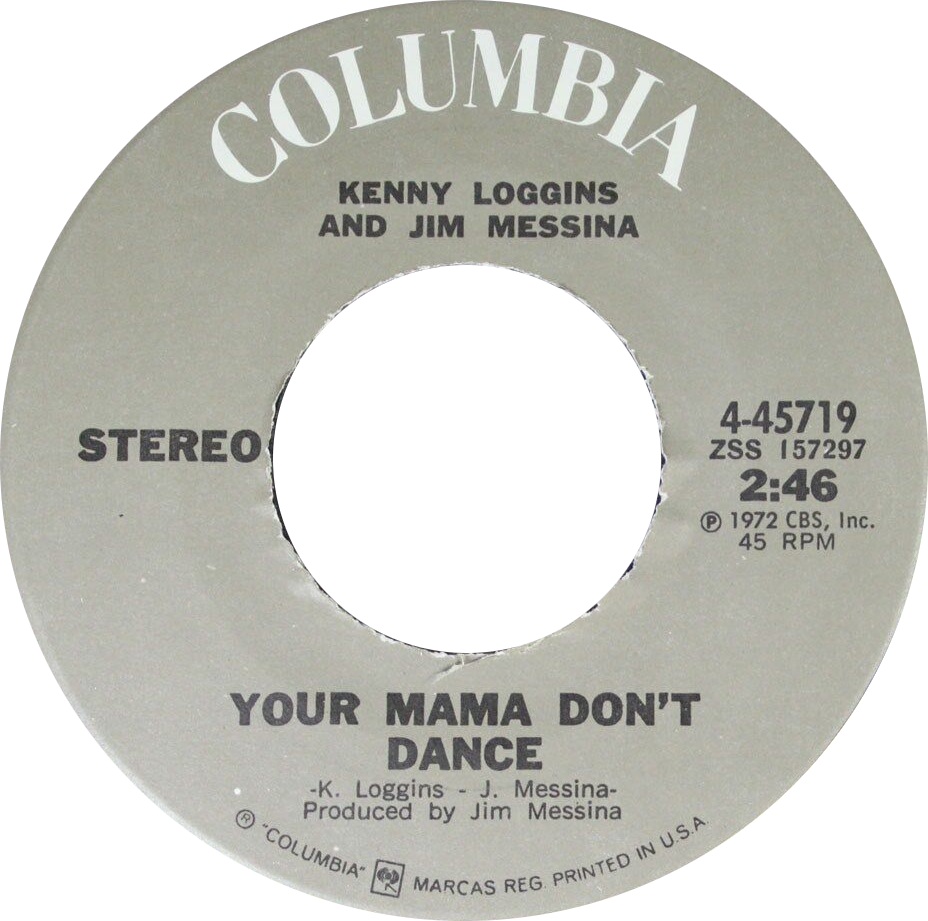
- Side A of the US single

Single by Loggins and Messina

from the album Loggins and Messina
- B-side: "Golden Ribbons"
- Released: November 1972
- Recorded: 1972
- Studio: Columbia (Los Angeles)
- Genre: Soft rock, rock and roll, blues rock
- Length: 2:48
- Label: Columbia
- Songwriters: Kenny Loggins, Jim Messina
- Producer: Jim Messina

Loggins and Messina singles chronology
"Peace of Mind" (1972)	"Your Mama Don't Dance" (1972)	"Thinking of You" (1973)

"Your Mama Don't Dance" is a hit 1972 song by the rock duo Loggins and Messina. Released on their self-titled album Loggins and Messina, it reached number four on the Billboard pop chart and number 19 on the Billboard Easy Listening Chart as a single in early 1973.

== Overview ==
Jim Messina on the inspiration for
"Your Mama Don't Dance"
"My stepfather...from Arkansas...was not much of a mover or...groover. [But] my mom...loved music. She loved Elvis Presley & Ricky Nelson. She loved [R&B] music. My stepfather was more of an Ernest Tubb, Hank Snow, Johnny Cash kind of guy. There was not a whole lot of connection or understanding with me wanting to do music, other than from my mom.
So...the line: 'Your mama don't dance & your daddy don't rock & roll', came from me thinking about how my mother wasn't really doing what she loves to do [because] my stepfather was not into rock & roll. He thought the Beatles were just...screaming, long-haired idiots...So I grew up having to put up with that [but] it was [just] a fun lyric [with no intended] social significance whatsoever other than my own experience of a kinda funky household."

This song, whose refrain and first verse is done in a blues format, deals with the 1950s and 1960s lifestyle concerning the generation gap, where the parents oppose the Rock and Roll Revolution of the younger generation, which includes the rebelliousness against the old society that monitors curfews on dating; as well as being arrested for having sex with a girl in the back seat of a car during a drive-in movie, which happens during the bridge section of the song.

When released as a single, it was the duo's biggest hit as well as their only gold single.

"Your Mama Don't Dance" was covered in 1973 by the Australian band The Bootleg Family Band, which made the top 5 in Australia. It was also covered in 1985 by the rock band Y&T.

Elvis Presley included the song in a medley of rock n' roll songs on his 1974 album Elvis Recorded Live on Stage in Memphis.

== Poison cover ==
"Your Mama Don't Dance"

Single by Poison

from the album Open Up and Say... Ahh!
- B-side: "Tearin' Down the Walls"
- Released: February 1, 1989
- Genre: Glam metal; blues rock
- Length: 3:00
- Label: Enigma; Capitol
- Songwriters: Kenny Loggins; Jim Messina
- Producer: Tom Werman

Poison singles chronology
"Every Rose Has Its Thorn" (1988)	"Your Mama Don't Dance" (1989)	"Unskinny Bop" (1990)

Music videos
- "Your Mama Don't Dance" on YouTube

The glam metal band Poison released a cover of "Your Mama Don't Dance" in 1989. It appeared as the ninth track on their second album, Open Up and Say... Ahh!, and was released as the album's fourth single. The Poison version reached number 10 on the US Billboard Hot 100 and number 39 on the Billboard Album Rock Tracks chart. It has since been certified gold in the US. The song also charted at number 21 on the Australian ARIA Singles Chart and number 13 on the UK Singles Chart. The single's B-side is "Tearin' Down the Walls".

=== Critical reception ===
Cash Box said "Take a classic Loggins & Messina rock/blues song, and play. It’s an instant hit." Melody Maker called Poison's version "defiantly, purposefully, irredeemably rock'n'roll" and considered it "cringing tribute" to its golden age. Reviewer of Record Mirror was disappointed by this single. He found it ″completely naff″ when contrasted with "Every Rose Has Its Thorn", the band's previous ″quite listenable hit″. Edwin Pouncey in his review for New Musical Express criticized unnatural sound of the band resulted with verdict: "we get this wimpy pile of crapola dished up dog style." Jerry Smith from British music newspaper Music Week also expressed an opinion that this "ordinary slice of good-time rock'n'roll" is "highly unlikely to enhance their reputation as wild, heavy rockers". Pan-European magazine Music & Media described the song as "energetic version" of traditional 12 -bar with a vague doo-wop edge. In 2017, Billboard and OC Weekly ranked the song number six and number five, respectively, on their lists of the 10 greatest Poison songs.

== Personnel ==
=== Loggins & Messina version ===
- Kenny Loggins – vocals, electric guitar (plus solo)
- Jim Messina – vocals, electric guitar
- Jon Clarke – baritone saxophone
- Al Garth – alto saxophone
- Larry Sims – bass, backing vocals
- Merel Bregante – drums, backing vocals
- Michael Omartian – piano
- Milt Holland – congas, cowbells

=== Poison version ===
- Bret Michaels – lead vocals, acoustic guitar, backing vocals
- C.C. DeVille – lead guitar, rhythm guitar, backing vocals
- Bobby Dall – bass, backing vocals
- Rikki Rockett – drums, backing vocals

== Charts ==
=== Weekly charts ===
Loggins and Messina version

Chart (1972–1973)	Peak position
Australia (Kent Music Report)	30
Belgium (Ultratop 50 Flanders)	27
Canada RPM Top Singles	5
Canada RPM Adult Contemporary	31
Netherlands (Single Top 100)	20
New Zealand (Listener)	11
US Billboard Hot 100	4
US Billboard Easy Listening	19

Poison version

Chart (1989)	Peak position
Australia (ARIA)	21
Canada Top Singles (RPM)	17
Europe (Eurochart Hot 100)	43
Ireland (IRMA)	15
New Zealand (Recorded Music NZ)	3
UK Singles (Official Charts)	13
US Billboard Hot 100	10
US Mainstream Rock (Billboard)	39

=== Year-end charts ===
Loggins and Messina version

Chart (1973)	Rank
Canada RPM Top Singles	58
US Billboard Hot 100	53

Poison version

Chart (1989)	Rank
New Zealand (RIANZ)	30
