= Every Rose Has Its Thorn =

1988 single by Poison

Single by Poison

from the album Open Up and Say... Ahh!
- B-side: "Livin for the Minute" (US); "Back to the Rocking Horse" (UK)
- Released: 1988
- Recorded: 1988
- Studio: Conway (Hollywood, California)
- Genre: Glam metal; soft rock; acoustic rock
- Length: 4:20
- Label: Capitol
- Songwriters: Bret Michaels; C.C. DeVille; Bobby Dall; Rikki Rockett
- Producer: Tom Werman

Poison singles chronology
"Fallen Angel" (1988)	"Every Rose Has Its Thorn" (1988)	"Your Mama Don't Dance" (1989)

Music videos
- "Every Rose Has Its Thorn" on YouTube

"Every Rose Has Its Thorn" is a song by American glam metal band Poison. A power ballad, it was released in October 1988 as the third single from their second studio album Open Up and Say... Ahh!. The band's signature song, it was their only No. 1 hit in the US, topping the Billboard Hot 100 for three weeks, starting on December 24, 1988. It also peaked at No. 11 on the Mainstream Rock chart, and No. 13 on the UK Singles chart.

"Every Rose Has Its Thorn" was named number 34 on VH1's "100 Greatest Songs of the 80s", number 100 on their "100 Greatest Love Songs" and number seven on MTV and VH1 "Top 25 Power Ballads". Billboard ranked the song number five on their list of "The 10 Best Poison Songs".

== Background and writing ==
In an interview with VH1's Behind the Music, Bret Michaels said the inspiration for the song came from a night when he was in a laundromat in Dallas waiting for his clothes to dry, and called his girlfriend on a pay phone. Michaels said he heard a male voice in the background and was devastated; he said he went into the laundromat and wrote "Every Rose Has Its Thorn" as a result.

== Music video ==
The music video to "Every Rose Has Its Thorn" was directed by Marty Callner. It starts out with a forlorn Bret Michaels in bed with a young woman, they both look unhappy. He gets up, does the heavy sigh that is at the start of the song and walks away to play the acoustic guitar, the video then goes into video clips of the band's tour. The same young woman is seen driving a Thunderbird in the rain (two different times), listening to "Every Rose Has Its Thorn" on the car's radio. The video was shot at the Brown County Veterans Memorial Arena in Green Bay, Wisconsin, and in an empty warehouse nearby. The video ends with Michaels playing the last of the song on his acoustic guitar and walking away.

== Critical reception ==
Jerry Smith, reviewer of British music newspaper Music Week, described this song as "over-wrought ballad, but it makes a change from their ponderous metal posturing". Cash Box said that "Poison slows it down with a bevy of acoustic guitars, and deliver a well-measured ballad."

== Legacy ==
"Every Rose Has Its Thorn" has been seen as a glam metal classic, being ranked on multiple "best of" lists. In a poll of "The 10 Greatest Hair Metal Songs" held by Rolling Stone, the song was ranked at number 6 and praised for showing the "hair metal lifestyle wasn't a non-stop carnival of good times." In 2017, Billboard and OC Weekly ranked the song number five and number two, respectively, on their lists of the 10 greatest Poison songs.

== Personnel ==
- Bret Michaels - lead and background vocals, acoustic guitar
- C.C. DeVille - electric guitar, keyboards
- Bobby Dall - bass guitar
- Rikki Rockett - drums

== Charts ==
=== Weekly charts ===
Chart (1988–1989)	Peak position
Australia (ARIA)	16
Canada Top Singles (RPM)	2
Europe (Eurochart Hot 100)	25
Ireland (IRMA)	8
Netherlands (Dutch Top 40)	18
Netherlands (Single Top 100)	18
New Zealand (Recorded Music NZ)	8
Sweden (Sverigetopplistan)	20
Switzerland (Schweizer Hitparade)	12
UK Singles (Official Charts)	13
US Billboard Hot 100	1
US Mainstream Rock Airplay (Billboard)	11
West Germany (GfK)	38

=== Year-end charts ===
Chart (1989)	Position
Australia (ARIA)	87
Canada Top Singles (RPM)	58
New Zealand (RIANZ)	18
US Billboard Hot 100	3

== Certifications ==
Region	Certification	Certified units/sales
New Zealand (RMNZ)	2× Platinum	60,000^{‡}
United Kingdom (BPI)	Silver	200,000^{‡}
United States (RIAA)	Gold	500,000^{^}
^{^} Shipments figures based on certification alone.^{‡} Sales+streaming figures based on certification alone.

== Cover versions ==
- On May 26, 2010 Bret Michaels performed a more up-tempo country and blues version of the song featuring guest vocals by Casey James on the season finale of the ninth season for the singing competition tv series American Idol. The performance was released as a music video on American Idol's official YouTube channel.
- American recording artist Miley Cyrus recorded a version of the song for her 2010 album Can't Be Tamed.
