= Unskinny Bop =

1990 single by Poison

Single by Poison

from the album Flesh and Blood
- B-side: "Valley of Lost Souls"
- Released: June 18, 1990
- Genre: Glam metal; pop metal
- Length: 3:48
- Label: Capitol; Enigma
- Songwriters: C.C. DeVille; Bret Michaels; Bobby Dall; Rikki Rockett
- Producer: Bruce Fairbairn

Poison singles chronology
"Your Mama Don't Dance" (1989)	"Unskinny Bop" (1990)	"Something to Believe In" (1990)

Music videos
- "Unskinny Bop" on YouTube

"Unskinny Bop" is a song by American glam metal band Poison, released as the first single from their third studio album, Flesh & Blood (1990), on June 18, 1990. The song peaked at number three on the US Billboard Hot 100, number five on the Billboard Album Rock Tracks chart, and number one on Canada's The Record chart. It also entered the top 20 in Australia, New Zealand, Sweden, and the United Kingdom.

== Background ==
The meaning of "Unskinny Bop" has always been shrouded in obscurity. Guitarist C.C. DeVille later confessed the phrase "unskinny bop" has no particular meaning: he invented it as temporary placeholder words while writing the song, before vocalist Bret Michaels had begun working on the lyrics. The phrase was used as it was phonetically suited to the music. The song was later played to producer Bruce Fairbairn, who said although he did not know what an "unskinny bop" was, the phrase was perfect.

In the song "Home (Bret's Story)" off Poison's 2002 album Hollyweird, Bret discusses a dinner with Nicolas Cage and Charlie Sheen in the lyrics, explaining:

Rockstars, movie stars, a Hollywood scene,

I eat dinner with Nick Cage and Charlie Sheen,

Nick asks me what the hell Unskinny Bop means,

"It's slang for C.C. banging a porno queen!"

== Music video ==
The music video for the song features Bret Michaels, dancing with a couple of animated neon cowgirls next to him.

== Track listings ==
- 7-inch and cassette single
1. "Swampjuice (Soul-O)" – 1:26
2. "Unskinny Bop" – 3:47
3. "Valley of Lost Souls" – 5:37
- 12-inch and CD single
1. "Swampjuice (Soul-O)" – 1:26
2. "Unskinny Bop" – 3:47
3. "Valley of Lost Souls" – 5:37
4. "Poor Boy Blues" – 5:19
- Japanese mini-CD single
1. "Unskinny Bop"
2. "Valley of Lost Souls"

== Charts ==
=== Weekly charts ===
Chart (1990)	Peak position
Australia (ARIA)	7
Canada Retail Singles (The Record)	1
Canada Top Singles (RPM)	3
Europe (Eurochart Hot 100)	42
Ireland (IRMA)	24
Netherlands (Single Top 100)	34
New Zealand (Recorded Music NZ)	3
Sweden (Sverigetopplistan)	19
UK Singles (Official Charts)	15
US Billboard Hot 100	3
US Mainstream Rock (Billboard)	5
US Cash Box Top 100	3

=== Year-end charts ===
Chart (1990)	Position
Australia (ARIA)	28
New Zealand (RIANZ)	31
US Billboard Hot 100	32
US Album Rock Tracks (Billboard)	49
US Cash Box Top 100	33

=== Decade-end charts ===
Chart (1990–1999)	Position
Canada (Nielsen SoundScan)	62

== Certifications ==
Region	Certification	Certified units/sales
Australia (ARIA)	Gold	35,000^{^}
Canada (Music Canada)	Gold	50,000^{^}
United States (RIAA)	Gold	500,000^{^}
^{^} Shipments figures based on certification alone.

== Release history ==
Region	Date	Format(s)	Label(s)	Ref.
United Kingdom	June 18, 1990	12-inch vinyl; CD; cassette	Capitol; Enigma	
United Kingdom	June 25, 1990	12-inch picture disc	Capitol; Enigma	
Japan	June 29, 1990	Mini-CD	CBS/Sony	

== See also ==
- List of glam metal albums and songs
