= Flesh & Blood (Poison album) =

Studio album by Poison
- Released: July 10, 1990
- Recorded: 1989–1990
- Studios: Little Mountain (Vancouver, Canada)
- Genre: Glam metal
- Length: 57:38
- Labels: Enigma; Capitol
- Producers: Bruce Fairbairn; Mike Fraser

Poison chronology
Open Up and Say... Ahh! (1988)	Flesh & Blood (1990)	Swallow This Live (1991)

Alternative cover
- Original banned blood version

Singles from Flesh & Blood
- 1. "Unskinny Bop" Released: June 18, 1990; 2. "Something to Believe In" Released: September 17, 1990; 3. "Ride the Wind" Released: January 21, 1991; 4. "Life Goes On" Released: March 29, 1991

Flesh & Blood is the third studio album by American glam metal band Poison, released on July 10, 1990, through Enigma and Capitol. It peaked at number 2 on the Billboard charts and more than 7 million copies were sold worldwide. It peaked at number 1 on the Cash Box charts.

The album was an attempt by the band to establish a more serious musical stance, more than just the hair metal party dynamic of 1988's Open Up and Say... Ahh!. It spawned two top 10 singles, "Unskinny Bop" and "Something to Believe In" and three other hit singles, "Ride the Wind", "Life Goes On", and "(Flesh & Blood) Sacrifice".

It was certified Platinum in 1990 and triple Platinum in 1991 by the RIAA. It has been certified 4× Platinum by CAN and Gold by BPI.

== Production and marketing ==
The album was recorded and mixed at Little Mountain Sound Studios, Vancouver, British Columbia, Canada, with Canadian producer Bruce Fairbairn and mixer Mike Fraser.

The front cover art features the Poison logo and album title as a tattoo on drummer Rikki Rockett's arm. The cover was originally planned to have a slightly different version of the tattoo after being freshly inked, with inflamed red skin with dripping ink or blood. The original cover was released for the initial pressing in Japan but was removed from all later pressings including those in Japan. The record's marketing reflected the end of Poison's glam image, including excessive make-up and teased, girlish hair as with Look What the Cat Dragged In, instead being similar to Guns N' Roses.

== Songs ==
Parts of the album are darker and more serious, including overcoming hard times, missing loved ones, long-term relationships, and mass sociopolitical disillusionment. Fun topics include sex, exhilaration from music or motorbikes, and tongue-in-cheek poverty. Some songs have a blues rock style.

The meaning of the album's lead single "Unskinny Bop", one of the band's most popular songs, is obscure. DeVille later confessed that the phrase "unskinny bop" has no particular meaning. He devised it as a temporary measure while writing the song, before vocalist Bret Michaels had begun working on the lyrics. The phrase was used on the basis that it was phonetically suited to the music. The song was later played to producer Fairbairn, who stated that although he did not know what an "unskinny bop" was, the phrase was perfect.

== Critical reception ==
Professional ratings
Review scores
Source	Rating
AllMusic	3.5/5 stars
The Encyclopedia of Popular Music	4/5 stars
Entertainment Weekly	B−
Rolling Stone	2/5 stars
Select	3/5 medals

Entertainment Weekly noted that despite their commercial success, Poison lacked respect from music critics who damned their music as "hard-rock candy", and characterized the "harder and more realistic" Flesh & Blood as an attempt to address this, balancing more typical hard rock topics like liberation and sex with more thoughtful subjects. Despite finding "lots to respect" and smile at on the album, they bemoaned that by "taking life more seriously, Poison is taking itself more seriously, too", as per the record's studio chatter, guitar fragments and answer machine messages, and believed the band "plays eagerly but not very well". Chuck Eddy of Rolling Stone noted how, tired of being mocked in heavy metal circles, Poison "now wants to rock, damnit", but criticized the resultant album for "[letting] pop fall by the wayside" and forgoing the group's strengths. He further panned Fairbairn's "stale air" production for recalling the 'slushy' sound of his late 1980s albums with Aerosmith, adding: "The guy's got no use for rhythm sections, and his aesthetic hearkens closer to Days of Future Passed than to Toys in the Attic", which for "concise 4/4 hook-and-riff bands" like Poison is unhelpful. He further deemed Flesh & Blood "the Poison CD for suckers who think Pump was good Aerosmith." The Village Voice's Deborah Frost was more favorable, enjoying the Aerosmith similarities and noting that Poison's specifics "give you a sense that they're writing from some real experience rather than the How To Be a Tough Hollywood Mofo manual. They also sound, as Fairbairn has recorded them, most like a real band, not a rack of studio effects."

In the United Kingdom, where the album reached number three and "Unskinny Bop" was a top 20 hit, both achievements coming ahead of their British concert (at Castle Donington), Paul Sexton of Select wrote that Flesh & Blood "abounds with anthemic rockist singalongs" on the subjects of sex and the rock band lifestyle, but adds that they can "pull in other directions", noting the themes of disillusion and ideological unclarity on "Life Loves a Tragedy" and "Something to Believe In", respectively, as well as musical detours such as the minute-long, New Orleans-style slide guitar instrumental "Swamp Juice" and the rootsy "Poor Boy Blues". The Stud Brothers dismissed Flesh & Blood in their Melody Maker review, deeming it "the most hatefully hackneyed and infuriatingly pedestrian collection of songs you're likely to hear this or any other year", writing that the "matey asides" punctuating the songs and "mannered idiosyncrasies" are unsuccessful in elevating the quality. They wrote the band omit references to debauchery, decadence or anything "even vaguely interesting", with stomping choruses being most important to the band, opining that "the words, really just the songtitles, are there simply to be shouted."

Among retrospective reviews, AllMusic's Steve Huey wrote that Poison "made a bid to be taken seriously" following the critical panning of the best-selling Open Up and Say...Ahh! (1988), adding: "Even the title of Flesh & Blood indicates a desire for more substance and reality in their music, as do darker songs [on the album]". Huey believed it occasionally works successfully, aided by the band's consistent songwriting and "wider musical range that occasionally veers into swampy blues-rock", but that at other times, Michaels seems "too self-consciously proud of his own ambition to recognize when he oversteps his bounds". Ultimate Classic Rock's Jeff Gilles agreed that Poison "set out to prove they were more than just a few pretty faces", arguing that successful bands need occasional chances to show their darker sides. He believed the album balances sexualised glam metal with darker themes. In The Virgin Encyclopedia of Heavy Rock (1997), Colin Larkin wrote that, by Flesh & Blood, Poison had dramatically toned down their 'glam band' image and make-up wearing.

== Accolades ==
Flesh & Blood was voted Best Album in Circus magazine's 1990 Readers' Poll, and the album's second single "Something to Believe In" was voted Best Single.

The album yielded three Metal Edge Readers' Choice Awards in 1990: Album of the Year, and "Something to Believe In" for Song of the Year and Best Video.

== Track listing ==
All tracks are written by Bret Michaels, C.C. DeVille, Bobby Dall, and Rikki Rockett, except where noted.

No.	Title	Length
1.	"Strange Days of Uncle Jack"	1:40
2.	"Valley of Lost Souls"	3:58
3.	"(Flesh & Blood) Sacrifice"	4:40
4.	"Swampjuice (Soul-O)"	1:25
5.	"Unskinny Bop"	3:47
6.	"Let It Play"	4:21
7.	"Life Goes On"	4:47
8.	"Come Hell or High Water"	5:01
9.	"Ride the Wind"	3:50
10.	"Don't Give Up an Inch"	3:43
11.	"Something to Believe In"	5:28
12.	"Ball and Chain"	4:22
13.	"Life Loves a Tragedy"	5:14
14.	"Poor Boy Blues"	^{[†]}5:19
Total length:		57:38

2006 remastered edition bonus tracks:
No.	Title	Writer(s)	Length
15.	"Something to Believe In" (acoustic with new lyrics)		5:59
16.	"God Save the Queen" (instrumental; Sex Pistols cover)	Glen Matlock; John Lydon; Paul Cook; Steve Jones	2:47

† The 2006 reissue contains a mastering error, as the last few seconds of "Poor Boy Blues" are missing from this version.

== Video album ==
Flesh, Blood, & Videotape is the second video compilation released by Poison, featuring the music videos from Flesh & Blood.

1. "Let It Play" (Montage clip)
2. "Unskinny Bop"
3. "Ride the Wind"
4. "Poor Boy Blues" (Montage clip)
5. "Something to Believe In"
6. "Life Goes On"
7. "(Flesh & Blood) Sacrifice" (Uncensored version)

== Personnel ==
=== Poison ===
- Bret Michaels - lead vocals, rhythm guitar
- C.C. DeVille - lead guitar, backing vocals
- Bobby Dall - bass, piano, backing vocals
- Rikki Rockett - drums, backing vocals

=== Additional musicians ===
- John Webster - keyboards, piano

=== Production ===
- Produced by Bruce Fairbairn
- Co-produced by Mike Fraser
- Mastered by George Marino at Sterling Sound, NYC

== Charts ==
=== Weekly charts ===
Chart (1990)	Peak position
Australian Albums (ARIA)	2
Austrian Albums (Ö3 Austria)	17
Canada Top Albums/CDs (RPM)	4
Dutch Albums (Album Top 100)	88
Finnish Albums (The Official Finnish Charts)	16
German Albums (Offizielle Top 100)	31
Japanese Albums (Oricon)	23
New Zealand Albums (RMNZ)	4
Norwegian Albums (VG-lista)	11
Swedish Albums (Sverigetopplistan)	17
Swiss Albums (Schweizer Hitparade)	11
UK Albums (Official Charts)	3
US Billboard 200	2

=== Year-end charts ===
Chart (1990)	Position
Australian Albums (ARIA)	45
Canada Top Albums/CDs (RPM)	21
European Albums (Music & Media)	98
US Billboard 200	51

== Certifications ==
Region	Certification	Certified units/sales
Australia (ARIA)	Platinum	70,000^{^}
Canada (Music Canada)	4× Platinum	400,000^{^}
Chile	Gold	15,000
Indonesia	Gold	25,000
Malaysia	Gold	15,000
Mexico (AMPROFON)	Gold	100,000^{^}
New Zealand (RMNZ)	Gold	7,500^{^}
Singapore (RIAS)	Gold	7,500
South Korea (KMCA)	Gold	15,000
United Kingdom (BPI)	Gold	100,000^{^}
United States (RIAA)	3× Platinum	3,000,000^{^}
^{^} Shipments figures based on certification alone.
