= Something to Believe In (Poison song) =

1990 single by Poison

Single by Poison

from the album Flesh and Blood
- B-side: "Ball and Chain"
- Released: September 17, 1990
- Genre: Glam metal
- Length: 5:29
- Label: Capitol; Enigma
- Songwriters: Bret Michaels; C.C. DeVille; Bobby Dall; Rikki Rockett
- Producer: Bruce Fairbairn

Poison singles chronology
"Unskinny Bop" (1990)	"Something to Believe In" (1990)	"Ride the Wind" (1991)

Music video
- "Something to Believe In" on YouTube

"Something to Believe In" is a song by American glam metal band Poison, released as the second single from their third studio album, Flesh & Blood (1990). "Something to Believe In" was also released on the Best of Ballads & Blues album in 2003, with alternate lyrics (part 2). The ballad peaked at number four on the US Billboard Hot 100, number five on the Billboard Album Rock Tracks chart, and number one on Canada's The Record singles chart. It was Poison's last top-10 hit on the Billboard Hot 100.

== Background ==
This song was dedicated to James Kimo Maano, a security guard and best friend of Bret Michaels who had died some time earlier. The lyrics also focus on televangelism, Vietnam veterans, and poverty.

The cover art for the single depicts a tattoo on Michaels' arm of a cross with the words "Something to Believe In". The tattoo artist, according to Michaels, had been drinking and spelled "believe" incorrectly putting the "e" before the "i". It was attempted to be corrected by adding a rose to the cross that covered the misspelling, but Michaels was never satisfied with the results. In the first season of the reality show Rock of Love, Michaels goes to a tattoo shop where the tattoo artist properly touches up the tattoo.

== Reception ==
"Something to Believe In" is widely regarded as one of Poison's best songs. In 2017, Billboard and OC Weekly ranked the song number four and number one, respectively, on their lists of the 10 greatest Poison songs.

== Music video ==
During the filming of the video, unbeknownst to Michaels, the director had inserted footage of James Kimo Maano which was playing on a screen in front of Bret. This was done to try to draw an emotional reaction from Michaels. It worked so well that Michaels lost his composure and had to leave the set for several hours. On the final cut of the video, during the second verse, Michaels can be seen visibly holding back tears as he momentarily stops singing.

== Charts ==
=== Weekly charts ===
Chart (1990)	Peak position
Australia (ARIA)	44
Canada Retail Singles (The Record)	1
Canada Top Singles (RPM)	3
Europe (Eurochart Hot 100)	98
New Zealand (Recorded Music NZ)	38
UK Singles (Official Charts)	35
US Billboard Hot 100	4
US Mainstream Rock (Billboard)	5

=== Year-end charts ===
Chart (1990)	Position
Canada Top Singles (RPM)	38
Chart (1991)	Position
US Billboard Hot 100	78

=== Decade-end charts ===
Chart (1990–1999)	Position
Canada (Nielsen SoundScan)	80

== Certifications ==
Region	Certification	Certified units/sales
United States (RIAA)	Gold	500,000^{^}
^{^} Shipments figures based on certification alone.

== Release history ==
Region	Date	Format(s)	Label(s)	Ref.
United States	September 17, 1990	—N/a	Capitol; Enigma	
Australia	September 24, 1990	7-inch vinyl; cassette	Capitol; Enigma	
United Kingdom	October 15, 1990	7-inch vinyl; 12-inch vinyl; CD; cassette	Capitol; Enigma	
United Kingdom	October 22, 1990	10-inch vinyl	Capitol; Enigma	
Japan	November 1, 1990	Mini-CD	CBS/Sony	

== See also ==
- List of glam metal albums and songs
