= Open Up and Say... Ahh! =

- Original version of the cover art

Studio album by Poison
- Released: April 27, 1988
- Recorded: Late 1987 – early 1988
- Studios: Conway Recording, Los Angeles
- Genre: Glam metal
- Length: 36:12
- Labels: Enigma; Capitol
- Producer: Tom Werman

Poison chronology
Look What the Cat Dragged In (1986)	Open Up and Say... Ahh! (1988)	Flesh & Blood (1990)

Censored cover

Singles from Open Up and Say... Ahh!
- 1. "Nothin' But a Good Time" Released: April 6, 1988; 2. "Fallen Angel" Released: July 6, 1988; 3. "Every Rose Has Its Thorn" Released: October 12, 1988; 4. "Your Mama Don't Dance" Released: February 1, 1989

Professional ratings
Review scores
Source	Rating
Allmusic	4/5 stars
Robert Christgau	B+
Rolling Stone	1/5 stars

Open Up and Say... Ahh! is the second studio album by American glam metal band Poison, released on April 27, 1988, through Enigma Records and Capitol Records. It proved to be the band's most successful release, and spawned four hit singles: "Nothin' But a Good Time", "Fallen Angel", "Your Mama Don't Dance" (a Loggins and Messina cover) and their only number one single to date, "Every Rose Has Its Thorn". The album peaked at number two on the US Billboard 200.

Open Up and Say Ahh was certified platinum in 1988 and 5× platinum in 1991 by the RIAA. It also has been certified 4× platinum in Canada and gold by the BPI.

== Production and marketing ==
The album was recorded and mixed at Conway Recording Studios in Los Angeles. Paul Stanley from Kiss (whose song "Rock and Roll All Nite" had been covered by Poison the year before) was originally selected to produce the record, but was unable to fulfill the role due to scheduling conflicts. Instead, the band worked with Tom Werman. Werman was an experienced rock producer, having worked with artists such as Ted Nugent, Cheap Trick, Twisted Sister and Mötley Crüe.

Following the album was the release of the band's first video compilation, titled Sight for Sore Ears, which featured all the music videos from Open Up and Say...Ahh! and Look What the Cat Dragged In.

== Cover ==
The original front cover of the album, which featured model Bambi dressed as a luminous red demon with a protruding tongue, caused controversy among parental groups. The band changed the cover so that only the model's eyes were visible.

== Track information ==
Vocalist Bret Michaels allegedly wrote the band's most successful single, "Every Rose Has Its Thorn", in response to a failed love affair with a Los Angeles stripper. Poison had been playing at a cowboy bar called The Ritz in Dallas, Texas. After the show, Michaels called the woman at her apartment and heard a man's voice in the background. Heartbroken, he wrote the song with an acoustic guitar in a laundromat.

The first single "Nothin' But a Good Time" was born from the merger of a guitar riff by C. C. DeVille and a chorus by Michaels. Michaels later explained that he was in search of a "kick ass big arena rock song" which would make him feel good about his life. The song was about "not wanting to be held back by working a job and being depressed", as portrayed in its music video.

The fourth single, "Your Mama Don't Dance", was a cover version of the 1972 song written by Loggins and Messina from their 1972 self-titled album.

Two additional songs written for the record, "Livin' for the Minute" and "Face the Hangman", were later released as B-sides. "Face the Hangman" was later included on Crack a Smile... and More!.

== Track listing ==
All tracks are written by Bret Michaels, C.C. DeVille, Bobby Dall and Rikki Rockett, except where noted.

No.	Title	Length
1.	"Love on the Rocks"	3:33
2.	"Nothin' But a Good Time"	3:43
3.	"Back to the Rocking Horse"	3:34
4.	"Good Love"	2:51
5.	"Tearin' Down the Walls"	3:50
6.	"Look But You Can't Touch"	3:25
7.	"Fallen Angel"	3:56
8.	"Every Rose Has Its Thorn"	4:20
9.	"Your Mama Don't Dance" (Loggins and Messina cover)	3:00
10.	"Bad to Be Good"	4:03
Total length:		36:11

2006 remastered edition bonus tracks
No.	Title	Length
11.	"Livin' for the Minute"	2:41
12.	"World Premiere Interview" (radio interview)	10:45

== Personnel ==
- Bret Michaels – lead vocals, rhythm guitar, acoustic guitar (track 8), harmonica (track 4)
- C.C. DeVille – lead guitar, background vocals, keyboards (track 8)
- Bobby Dall – bass, background vocals
- Rikki Rockett – drums, background vocals

Additional credits:

- John Purdell – keyboard, horn
- Evren Göknar – 2006 and 2018 remastering

== Charts ==
=== Weekly charts ===
Chart (1988–1989)	Peak position
Australian Albums (ARIA)	7
Canada Top Albums/CDs (RPM)	10
Finnish Albums (The Official Finnish Charts)	16
Japanese Albums (Oricon)	35
New Zealand Albums (RMNZ)	1
Swedish Albums (Sverigetopplistan)	37
Swiss Albums (Schweizer Hitparade)	30
UK Albums (Official Charts)	18
US Billboard 200	2

=== Year-end charts ===
Chart (1988)	Position
US Billboard 200	23

Chart (1989)	Position
New Zealand Albums (RMNZ)	10
US Billboard 200	20

== Certifications ==
Region	Certification	Certified units/sales
Australia (ARIA)	3× Platinum	210,000^{^}
Canada (Music Canada)	4× Platinum	400,000^{^}
New Zealand (RMNZ)	Platinum	15,000^{^}
United Kingdom (BPI)	Gold	100,000^{^}
United States (RIAA)	5× Platinum	5,000,000^{^}
^{^} Shipments figures based on certification alone.
