= C.C. DeVille =

American guitarist (born 1962)

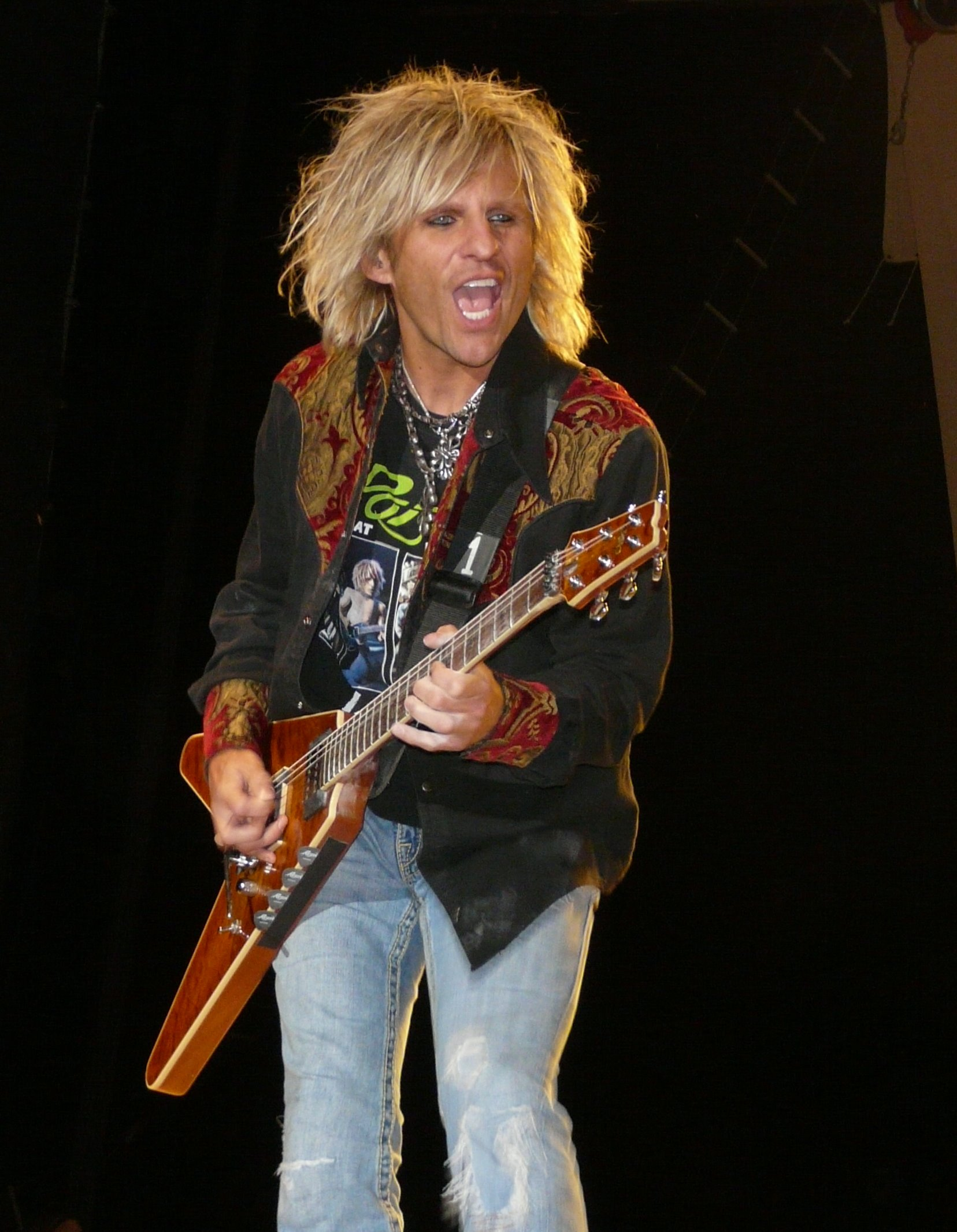
- DeVille with Poison in 2008

Background information
- Born: Bruce Anthony Johannesson; May 14, 1962 (age 64); Brooklyn, New York, U.S.
- Genres: Glam metal; hard rock; heavy metal
- Occupations: Musician; actor
- Instruments: Guitar
- Years active: 1980–present
- Member of: Poison
- Formerly of: Samantha 7
- Website: poisonweb.com

Bruce Anthony Johannesson (born May 14, 1962), known professionally as C.C. DeVille, is an American musician, best known as the lead guitarist of the rock band Poison. The band has sold over 65 million albums worldwide and 30 million records in the United States. In 1998, he formed a band called Samantha 7.

DeVille has acted in both reality television and in scripted television drama shows. He starred in The Surreal Life season 6 and in The Surreal Life: Fame Games.

== Early years ==
DeVille was born Bruce Anthony Johannesson in the Bay Ridge area of Brooklyn, New York. DeVille began playing the guitar at the age of five after he was given a $27 Japanese Telecaster copy. As his love of music grew, he began listening to bands such as Led Zeppelin, Black Sabbath, the Rolling Stones, David Bowie, Aerosmith, Van Halen, The Who, Cheap Trick, New York Dolls, Queen, and especially Kiss.

At age 18, Deville auditioned and joined the local band Lace. DeVille began studying music theory at New York University, but never completed his studies. Instead, he moved to Los Angeles in 1981 and played in various bands, including Screaming Mimi, Lace Slip, and St. James. DeVille also auditioned for the band Stryper before auditioning and being accepted into Poison.

== Musical career ==
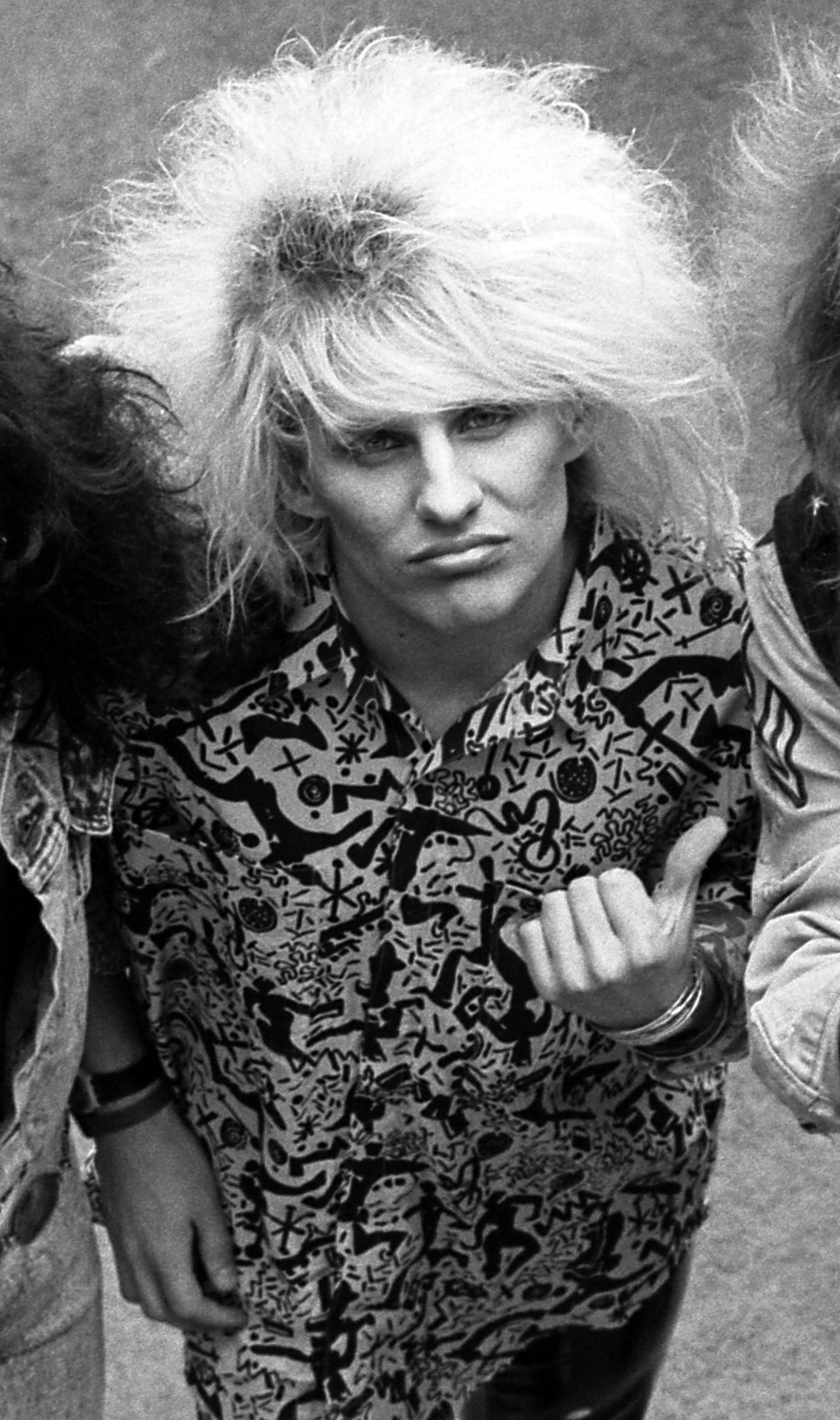
DeVille with Poison in 1987

DeVille's audition impressed drummer Rikki Rockett and bassist Bobby Dall, but angered vocalist Bret Michaels. DeVille refused to play the songs that had been given to him as preparation, and instead jammed with a guitar riff he had written. The riff, which would eventually be featured in the Poison single "Talk Dirty to Me", would ultimately launch the band's career.

DeVille co-wrote Poison's debut album with Bret Michaels, Bobby Dall, and Rikki Rockett. Look What the Cat Dragged In was released on May 23, 1986. It included the hits "Talk Dirty to Me", "I Want Action", and "I Won't Forget You". Sales for the album topped 3 million copies in the United States. DeVille also wrote much of the material for Poison's second album, the multi-platinum selling Open Up and Say... Ahh!, which was released on May 21, 1988, and would ultimately go on to sell 8 million copies worldwide. It included the hit song "Nothin' But a Good Time", co-written by DeVille, and Poison's only number 1 single "Every Rose Has Its Thorn".

In 1990, Poison released the multi-platinum selling Flesh & Blood, an album which was again largely written by DeVille.

=== Leaving Poison ===
While touring in support of Flesh and Blood, and despite Poison's success, substance abuse and tensions with other members of the band, particularly lead singer Bret Michaels, led to conflict within the band. Leading up to the release of the live album Swallow This Live conflict between Michaels and DeVille culminated in a fistfight backstage at the 1991 MTV Video Music Awards after DeVille played the wrong song, playing "Talk Dirty To Me" instead of "Unskinny Bop", and being high and intoxicated during the performance. Asked to quit, DeVille left Poison and was replaced by guitarist Richie Kotzen.

Following his departure from Poison, DeVille briefly formed a solo band that also featured vocalist Spike of The Quireboys, bassist Tommy Henriksen, and drummer James Kottak (later of Scorpions), and recorded a cover of "Hey, Good Lookin'" for the soundtrack to the Pauly Shore movie Son in Law. Following this, DeVille also formed another short-lived band named Needle Park.

=== Samantha 7 ===
Samantha 7 was a short-lived band composed of guitarist DeVille, guitarist Ty Longley, bassist Krys Baratto, and drummer Francis Ruiz. They played at Woodstock 1999. Originally the band's name was The Stepmothers, but the band was forced to change their name following a legal dispute with another band of the same name. DeVille can be heard referring to this band as The Stepmothers in a Behind the Music interview. Samantha 7 released the self-titled album Samantha 7 in 2000, and toured the US and UK in support of the record that was released on Columbia/Portrait Records.

The Samantha 7 song "I Wanna be Famous" would later be used in the opening of the reality show The Surreal Life: Fame Games, in which DeVille starred.

=== Return to Poison ===
DeVille regained contact with his Poison bandmates in 1996 for their Greatest Hits reunion tour in 1999. Several shows were recorded and released as a hybrid studio & live album release in 2000 titled Power to the People. DeVille continues to record and perform with Poison. In 2022, the band completed The Stadium Tour, a 36 date tour with Def Leppard, Joan Jett and Mötley Crüe in football stadiums across the US which grossed $173.5 million in ticket sales.

== Television ==
In 2005 and 2006, DeVille starred in a TV series South of Nowhere on The N. He played the role of Raife Davies, the father of Ashley Davies and Kyla Woods. Also in 2006 when Poison celebrated their 20th anniversary, DeVille starred in The Surreal Life on VH1. He also starred in the spin-off series The Surreal Life: Fame Games in 2007. In 2002, DeVille had a brief cameo appearance as "Lloyd", a member of the airband GFK Groovecart, on the last episode of season 6 of Just Shoot Me! (titled "The Boys In The Band").

== Personal life ==
In March 2007, DeVille and his girlfriend Shannon Malone became parents with the birth of Vallon Deville Johannesson. Vallon is also a musician, and plays drums with The Finz, an American rock band local to Southern California, and Laced, an American punk rock band also local to Southern California.

== Parodies ==
In 2001, DeVille became the inspiration for rock & roll comic C.C. Banana. A twisted homage to DeVille, C.C. Banana speaks in a cartoonish parody of DeVille's voice and wears a large yellow banana costume. C.C. Banana has interviewed numerous rock stars and made many TV appearances.

Parody act Beatallica mentioned DeVille in the song "I Want To Choke Your Band", the theme of which pits heavy metal bands against glam metal like Warrant, Poison, and Whitesnake. The lyric goes "No mercy for C.C., 'cuz he's in a hair band".

== Discography ==
Solo

- 1993 – C.C. DeVille – Son in Law Soundtrack – Hey Good Lookin' (with Spike from the Quireboys)
- 2000 – Samantha 7

With Poison / Bret Michaels

- 1986 – Poison Look What the Cat Dragged In
- 1988 – Poison – Open Up and Say... Ahh!
- 1990 – Poison – Flesh & Blood
- 1991 – Poison – Swallow This Live
- 1998 – Bret Michaels – A Letter from Death Row – Party Rock Band
- 2000 – Poison – Power to the People
- 2002 – Poison – Hollyweird
- 2003 – Poison – Best of Ballads & Blues
- 2003 – Bret Michaels – Songs of Life – Party Rock Band
- 2006 – Poison – The Best of Poison: 20 Years of Rock
- 2007 – Poison – Poison'd! (cover album)
- 2008 – Poison – Live, Raw & Uncut
- 2011 – Poison – Double Dose: Ultimate Hits

Other

- 1990 – Warrant – Cherry Pie (Guitar Solo on "Cherry Pie")
- 1990 – Sam Kinison – Have You Seen Me Lately? - Wild Thing
- 1990 – Sam Kinison – Leader of the Banned
- 1999 – LEN – You Can't Stop the Bum Rush – Feelin' Alright
- 2000 – The Muffs – Hamburger – (Guitar Solo on "Silly People")
- 2004 – Spin The Bottle: An All-Star Tribute To Kiss – "I Stole Your Love"
- 2006 – Motörhead – Kiss of Death (Guitar Solo on "God Was Never On Your Side")
