= Rikki Rockett =

American drummer (born 1961)

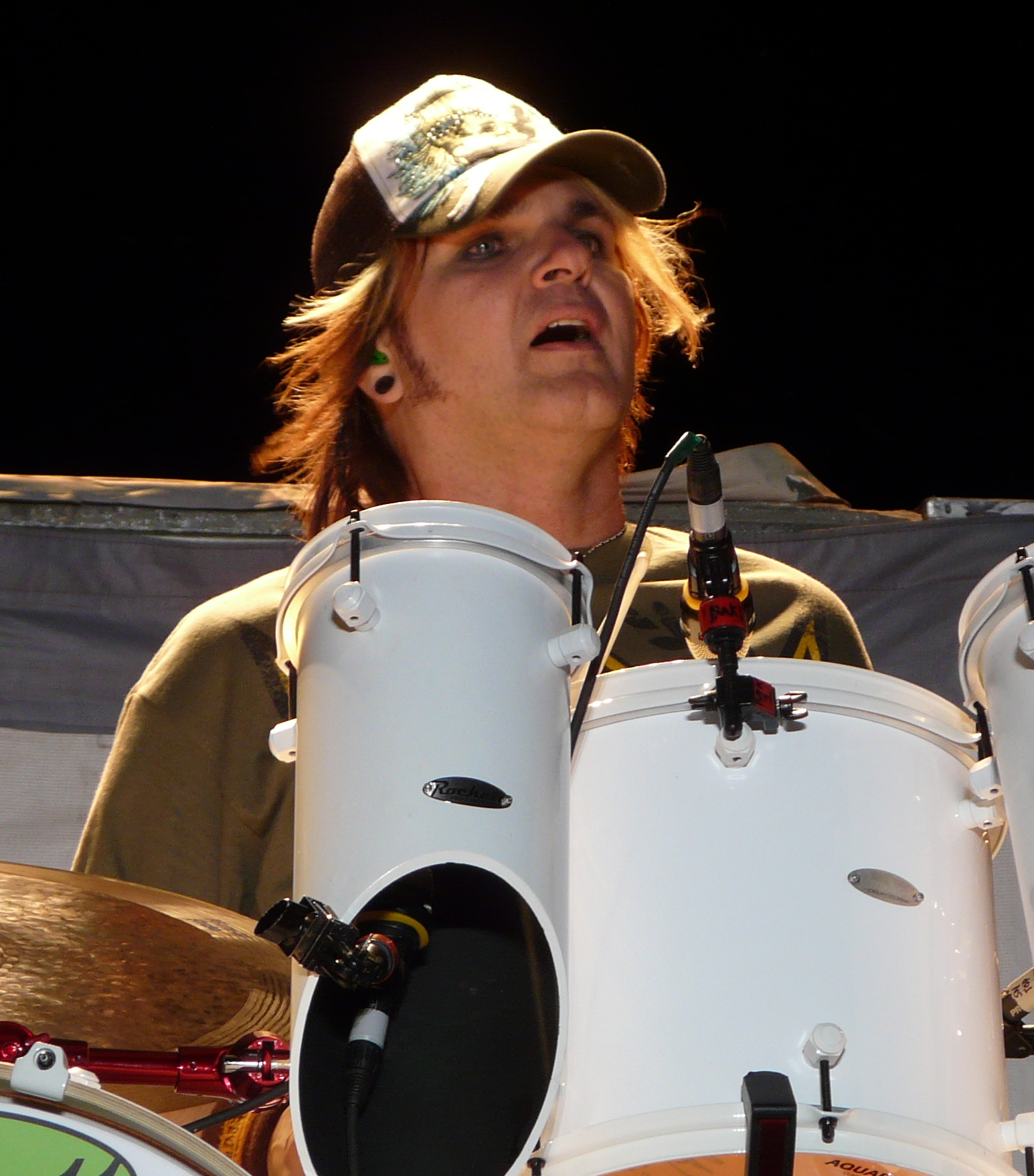
- Rockett with Poison in 2000

Background information
- Born: Richard Allan Ream; August 8, 1961 (age 65); Mechanicsburg, Pennsylvania, U.S.
- Genres: Glam metal; hard rock; heavy metal
- Occupation: Musician
- Instrument: Drums
- Years active: 1979–present
- Member of: Poison; Devil City Angels
- Website: rikkirockett.com

Richard Allan Ream (born August 8, 1961), known professionally as Rikki Rockett, is an American musician, best known as the drummer for the band Poison. The band has sold more than 50 million albums worldwide and 15 million records in the United States alone.

== Early life ==
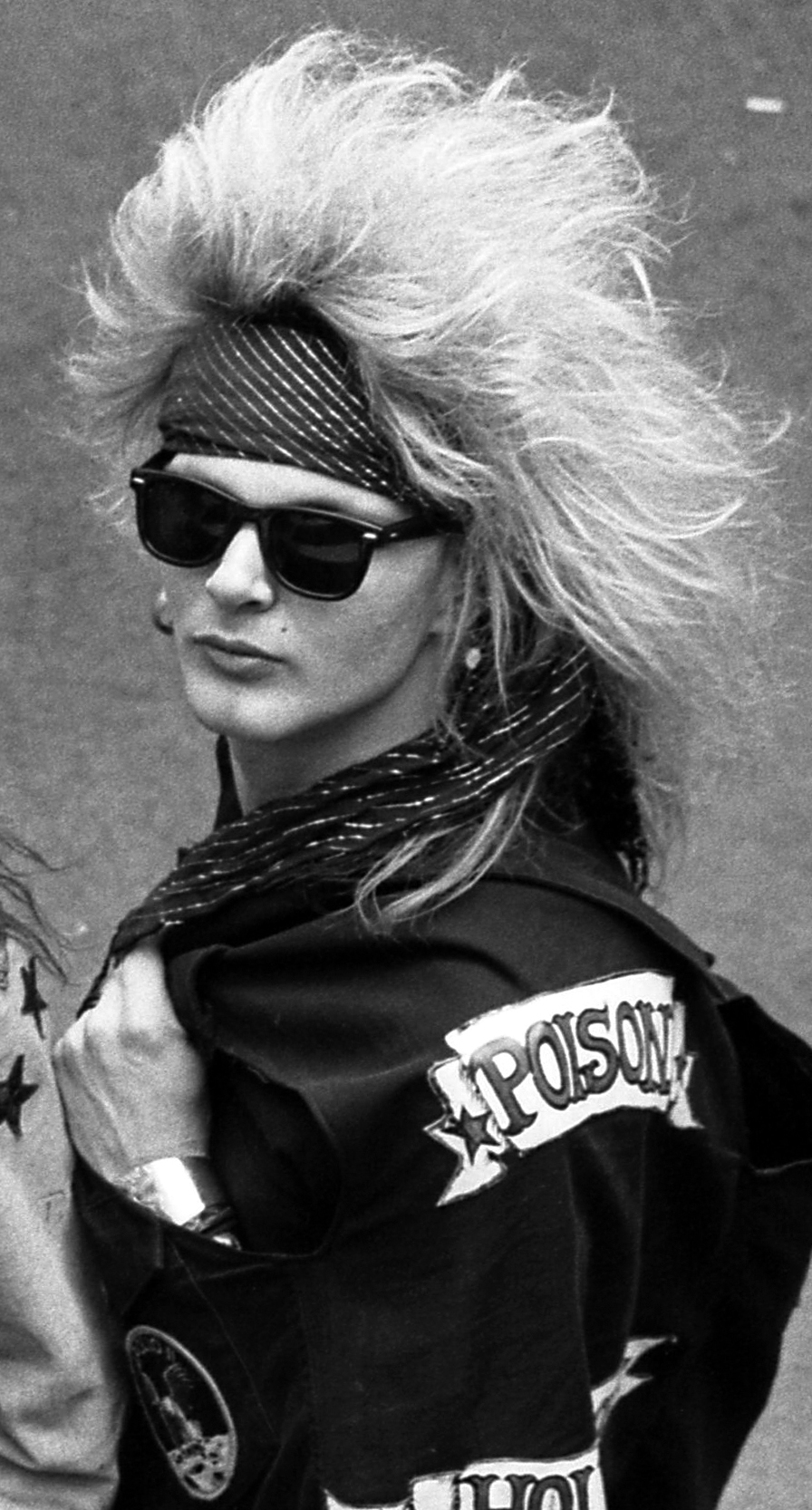
Rockett with Poison in 1987

Richard Allan Ream was born on August 8, 1961, in Mechanicsburg, Pennsylvania, the younger of two children of Norman and Margaret Ream. He attended Cedar Cliff High School in Camp Hill.

== Career ==
In 1995, Rockett co-created and colored the six-issue comic book series Sisters of Mercy, published by Maximum Press.

After almost 20 years with Poison, Rockett released his first solo album Glitter 4 Your Soul on January 7, 2003, which was distributed online. It was a tribute to 1970s glam rock. He also guested on Britny Fox's Bite Down Hard (1991).

In April 2007, Rockett announced the creation of Rockett Drum Works Inc. It is a drum manufacturing company, specializing in the creation of ultra custom drum kits, snare drums and custom accessories. Prior to setting up his enterprise, Rockett worked for Chop Shop Custom Drum. He departed after conflicting opinions with Chop Shop founder Brian Cocivera. Rockett recruited most of the staff from Chop Shop along with some newer staff members.

In 2015, Rockett co-formed a new rock supergroup, the Devil City Angels, with guitarist Tracii Guns (L.A. Guns), bassist Eric Brittingham (Cinderella), and vocalist and guitarist Brandon Gibbs (Cheap Thrill). Their self-titled debut album was released on September 11, 2015.

Rockett is scheduled to be inducted into the Metal Hall of Fame in January 2026.

== Personal life ==
In October 2008, Rockett married longtime girlfriend Melanie Martel. On July 14, 2009, they had their first child, Jude Aaron Rockett. On March 2, 2013, Rockett and Melanie had their second child, a daughter named Lucy Sky. Both children are named after The Beatles' songs "Hey Jude" and "Lucy in the Sky with Diamonds". They separated in July 2015 and their divorce became final in June 2017.

Rockett holds a black belt in Brazilian jiu-jitsu, under trainer Renato Magno and trains at Street Sports Brazilian jiu-jitsu, located in Santa Monica, California.

Rockett is a vegan.

In December 2015, Rockett announced that he had been battling throat cancer. In July 2016, he reported that he is now cancer-free. In July 2021, Rikki celebrated the fact that he is still cancer free, six years after the original diagnosis.

== Discography ==
=== Solo ===
- Glitter 4 Your Soul (2003)

=== Poison ===
- Look What the Cat Dragged In (1986)
- Open Up and Say... Ahh! (1988)
- Flesh & Blood (1990)
- Swallow This Live (1991)
- Native Tongue (1993)
- Poison's Greatest Hits: 1986-1996 (1996)
- Crack a Smile...and More! (2000)
- Power to the People (2000)
- Hollyweird (2002)
- Best of Ballads & Blues (2003)
- The Best of Poison: 20 Years of Rock (2006)
- Poison'd (June 2007)
- Live, Raw & Uncut (2008)
- Poison – Box Set (2009)
- Double Dose: Ultimate Hits (2011)

=== Devil City Angels ===
- Devil City Angels (2015)
