= Bret Michaels discography =

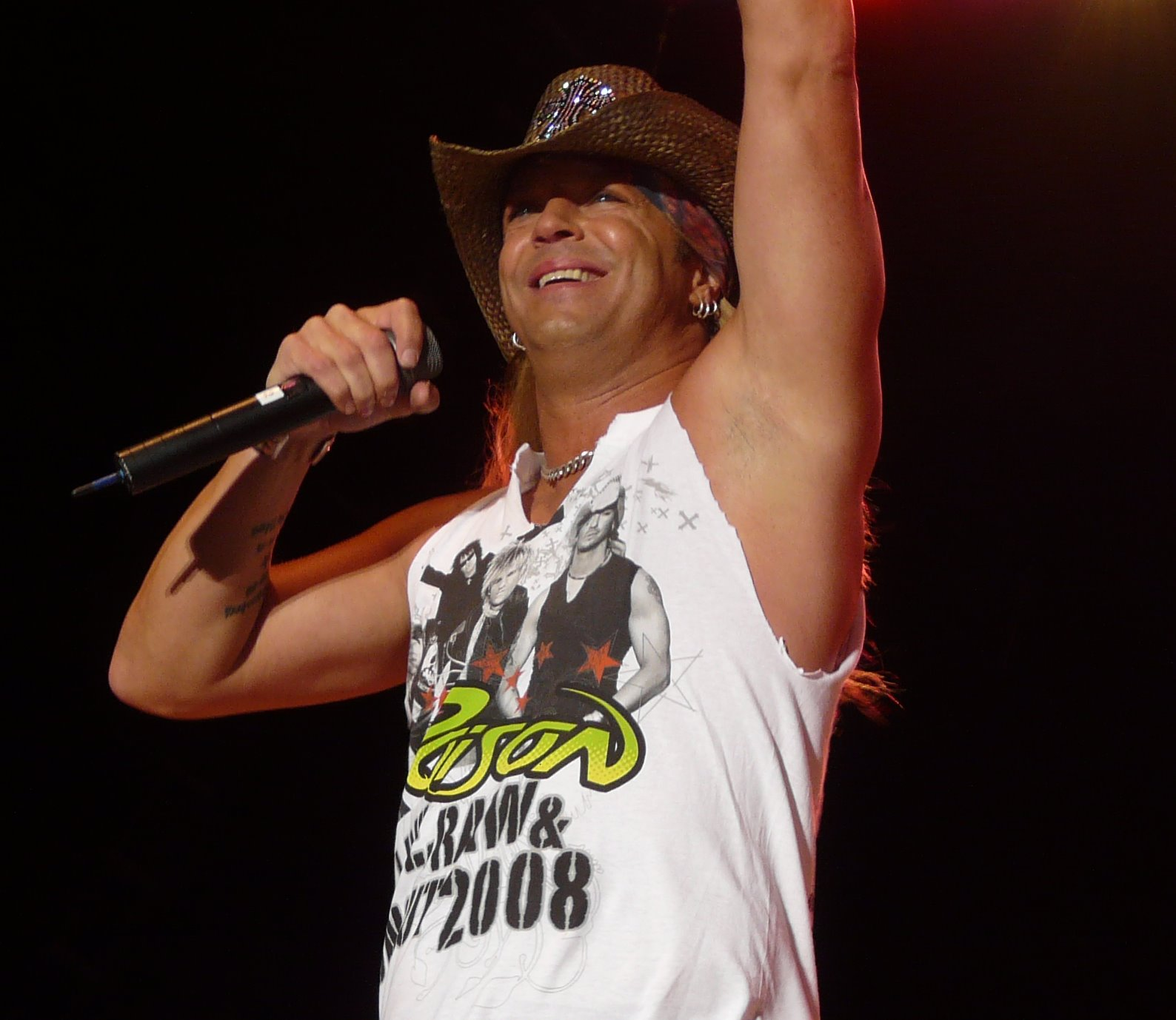
Michaels in 2008

The discography of American rock musician Bret Michaels consists of 4 studio albums, 1 soundtrack album, 4 compilation albums, 2 EPs and 29 singles.

Bret Michaels first gained fame as the lead vocalist of the glam metal band Poison who have sold over 45 million records worldwide and 15 million records in the United States alone. The band has also charted ten singles to the Top 40 of the Billboard Hot 100, including six Top 10 singles and the number-one single, "Every Rose Has Its Thorn".

Besides his career as lead singer, he has several solo albums to his credit, including the soundtrack album to the movie A Letter from Death Row in which Michaels starred, wrote and directed in 1998, and a classic Poison-style rock album, Songs of Life, in 2003. Michaels has appeared in several movies and TV shows, including as a judge on the talent show Nashville Star which led to his country influenced rock album Freedom of Sound in 2005. He starred in the hit VH1 reality show Rock of Love with Bret Michaels and its sequels, which inspired his successful solo album Rock My World. He was also the winning contestant on NBC's reality show Celebrity Apprentice 3 and also featured in his reality docu-series Bret Michaels: Life As I Know It, which inspired his highest charting album as a solo artist, Custom Built, reaching No. 1 on Billboard's Hard Rock list. He is also known for hosting on the Travel Channel. In 2006, Hit Parader ranked Michaels at #40 on their list of greatest Heavy metal singers of all-time.

== Studio albums ==
Title	Album details	Peak chart positions			
Title	Album details	US	US Rock	US Indie	US Hard Rock
Songs of Life	Released: April 22, 2003; Label: Poor Boy Records	—	—	—	—
Freedom of Sound	Released: January 1, 2005; Label: Poor Boy Records	—	—	—	—
Custom Built	Released: July 6, 2010; Label: Poor Boy Records	14	4	1	1
Jammin' with Friends	Released: June 25, 2013; Label: Poor Boy Records	80	29	23	13
"—" denotes releases that did not chart

== Soundtrack albums ==
Title	Album details
A Letter from Death Row	Released: August 25, 1998; Label: Ugl Records

== Compilation albums ==
Title	Album details	Peak chart positions			
Title	Album details	US	US Rock	US Indie	US Hard Rock
Poison Songs: Show Me Your Hits	Released: 2000 (re-released 2007 and 2022); Label: Cleopatra	—	—	—	—
Ballads, Blues & Stories	Released: 2001; Label: Poor Boy Records	—	—	—	—
Rock My World	Released: June 3, 2008; Label: VH1 Classics Records	40	16	4	4
True Grit	Released: May 5, 2015; Label: Poor Boy Records	–	–	–	–
"—" denotes releases that did not chart

== Extended plays ==
Title	Album details
Country Demos	Released: 2000; Label: Poor Boy Records
Bret Michaels: Acoustic Sessions	Released: 2008; Label: Time/Life Music

== Singles ==
Year	Single	Peak positions	Album
Year	Single	US Country	Album
1998	"A Letter from Death Row"	—	A Letter from Death Row
1998	"Party Rock Band" (with C.C. DeVille)	—	A Letter from Death Row
1998	"The Last Breath" (feat. Rikki Rockett)	—	A Letter from Death Row
1998	"I'd Die for You" (feat. Randy Castillo)	—	A Letter from Death Row
2003	"Raine"	—	Songs of Life
2003	"Bittersweet"	—	Songs of Life
2004	"Right Now, Right Here"	—	Freedom of Sound
2004	"All I Ever Needed" (with Jessica Andrews)	45	Freedom of Sound
2005	"Open Road"	—	Freedom of Sound
2007	"Every Rose Has Its Thorn (Acoustic)"	—	Show Me Your Hits
2007	"Go That Far" (Rock of Love theme)	—	Rock My World
2007	"Fallen"	—	Rock My World
2008	"Start Again"	—	Rock My World
2008	"Driven" (rock mix)	—	Rock My World
2010	"Nothing to Lose" (with Miley Cyrus)	—	Custom Built
2010	"Lie to Me"	—	Custom Built
2010	"Wasted Time"	—	Custom Built
2010	"What I Got"	—	Custom Built
2012	"Get Your Rock On" (feat. Phil Collen & Sal Costa)	—	Jammin' With Friends
2012	"Get Your Ride On" (AMA Supercross Theme – feat. Phil Collen)	—	Jammin' With Friends
2012	"Nothin' But a Good Time" (feat. Ace Frehley & Michael Anthony)	—	Jammin' With Friends
2012	"The App Song"	—	Jammin' With Friends
2013	"You Know You Want It" (featuring Peter Keys)	—	Jammin' With Friends
2013	"Every Rose Has Its Thorn (Acoustic 2013)"	—	
2014	"A Beautiful Soul"	—	True Grit
2015	"Girls on Bars"	—	True Grit
2017	"Jorja Bleu"	—	
2019	"Unbroken"	—	
2023	"Back in the Day (A Road Trip Anthem)"	—	
"—" denotes releases that did not chart

== Guest singles ==
Year	Single	Artist	US Country	Album
2004	"Good Year for the Outlaw"	Jeffrey Steele	54	Outlaw

== Filmography ==
Film and television
Year	Title	Role/Notes
1994	Burke's Law	TV series, 1 episode
1994	In God's Hands	
1998	A Letter from Death Row	
1998	The World's Greatest Magic 5	
1998	No Code of Conduct	director
1999	High Tension, Low Budget	Documentary (The Making of a Letter from Death Row)
1999	Martial Law	TV series, 1 episode
1999	Behind the Music: Poison	
2002	The Making of Bret Michaels	Documentary
2003	Yes, Dear	TV series
2005	Nashville Star	TV series, season 3
2007	Rock of Love with Bret Michaels	TV series
2008	Rock of Love 2	TV series
2008	Don't Forget The Lyrics	Fox TV
2008	Ellen-Fox Shows	February 14, 2008
2008	Saturday Night Live	
2008	VH1's "100 Greatest Hard Rock Songs	Host (5-part special; December 2008 – January 2009)
2009	Rock of Love Bus with Bret Michaels	TV series
2009	E True Hollywood Story: Bret Michaels	
2009	The Penguins of Madagascar	singing "Wheels of Thunder" in Little Zoo Coupe
2009	Behind the Music: Bret Michaels	
2009	American Pie Presents: The Book of Love	as himself
2010	The Celebrity Apprentice	as himself
2010	Bret Michaels: Life As I Know It	as himself
2011	Extreme Makeover: Home Edition	as himself
2012	The High Fructose Adventures of Annoying Orange	as himself
2013	The Celebrity Apprentice: All-Stars	as himself
2013	Rock My RV with Bret Michaels	as himself
2013	Full Throttle Saloon	as himself
2014	Revolution	Season 2, Ep. 13 as himself

=== Music videos ===
Year	Song	Director	Notes
2003	"Raine"	Shane Stanley	
2003	"Menace to Society"	Bret Michaels	Live montage video
2005	"All I Ever Needed"	Christie Cook	2nd version with Iraq footage released in 2008
2008	"Go That Far" (Rock of Love theme)"	Shane Stanley	3 versions – with Rock of Love clips, with live clips and standard with no clips
2008	"Fallen"	Shane Stanley	2 versions – with and without Rock of Love clips
2008	"Driven (Rock Mix)"	Shane Stanley	cut and uncut versions
2010	"Riding Against the Wind" (Bret Michaels: Life As I Know It Theme)	Shane Stanley	
2010	"What I Got"	Bret Michaels	
2011	"Hit and Roll" (Top Gear (U.S. TV series) Theme)	Jingle Punks Music	
2012	"Get Your Rock On"		
2012	"Get Your Ride On" (AMA Supercross Theme)		
2012	"The App Song"		Video Montage
2014	"A Beautiful Soul"		
2015	"Girls on Bars"	Damien Christian D'Amico/Bret Michaels	
2017	"Jorja Bleu"		
2019	"Unbroken"		
2023	"Back in the Day"		

== With Poison ==
Studio albums

- Look What the Cat Dragged In (1986)
- Open Up and Say... Ahh! (1988)
- Flesh & Blood (1990)
- Native Tongue (1993)
- Crack a Smile... and More! (2000)
- Hollyweird (2002)
- Poison'd! (2007)
