= True Grit (Bret Michaels album) =

Compilation album by Bret Michaels
- Released: May 5, 2015
- Recorded: 2002–2015
- Genre: Rock, country rock
- Length: 67:56
- Label: Poor Boy

Bret Michaels chronology
| Jammin' with Friends (2013) | True Grit (2015) |

Singles from True Grit
- 1. "A Beautiful Soul" Released: April 1, 2014; 2. "Girls On Bars" Released: April 9, 2015

True Grit is a compilation album released by American rock and country singer Bret Michaels of the band Poison. The album was released digitally on May 5, 2015 and on limited edition cd via his website. The album was officially announced through Michael's social media sites in early April 2015 along with the release of the new single "Girls On Bars" which boasted the highest number of views of any debut single ever on CMT.

== Production and recording ==
The album features three new original tracks and eighteen previously released country rock tracks from his last four studio albums: "Songs of Life", "Freedom of Sound", "Custom Built" and the most recent alternate versions album "Jammin' with Friends" which features guest musicians.

The new tracks include: "A Beautiful Soul" which was first released as a single in April 2014 featuring a music video and the new single "Girls On Bars" which was co written with Grammy award winning songwriter of the year, Luke Laird featuring a music video released May 12. Also included is the new song "Get Undone".

Many of the songs on the album are new renditions of older songs, some of the recordings go as far back as 2002. "True Grit is really a record of just taking songs like "Nothin' but a Good Time" and re-making them from the catalog of my past, and then my present, and then my future," said Michaels.

== Track listing ==
| No. | Title | Length |
|---|---|---|
| 1. | "Get Undone" | 2:42 |
| 2. | "Girls On Bars" | 3:25 |
| 3. | "A Beautiful Soul" | 3:54 |
| 4. | "App Song" (originally on Jammin' with Friends) | 3:19 |
| 5. | "Riding Against the Wind" (originally on Custom Built) | 3:42 |
| 6. | "Nothing to Lose (featuring Miley Cyrus)" (originally on Custom Built) | 3:55 |
| 7. | "Open Road" (originally on Freedom of Sound) | 3:56 |
| 8. | "Rock 'n My Country" (originally on Freedom of Sound) | 2:49 |
| 9. | "All I Ever Needed (featuring Jessica Andrews)" (originally on Freedom of Sound) | 3:31 |
| 10. | "New Breed of American Cowboy" (originally on Freedom of Sound) | 3:24 |
| 11. | "Fallen (featuring Jimmy McGorman)" (originally on Jammin' with Friends) | 3:28 |
| 12. | "Lookin' for a Good Time" (originally on Freedom of Sound) | 3:16 |
| 13. | "Raine (featuring Edwin Mccain)" (originally on Songs of Life) | 3:53 |
| 14. | "Sweet Home Alabama (featuring Rickey Medlocke, Gary Rossington, Bobby Capps & Peter Keys)" (originally on Jammin' with Friends) | 4:08 |
| 15. | "What I Got (featuring Jaret Reddick)" (originally on Custom Built) | 3:25 |
| 16. | "Stay with Me" (originally on Songs of Life) | 4:12 |
| 17. | "Nothin' but a Good Time (featuring Ace Frehley, Michael Anthony & The Sheilds Brothers)" (Classic rock version originally on Jammin' with Friends) | 4:06 |
| 18. | "Every Rose Has Its Thorn (featuring Loretta Lynn, Bobby Capps, Joe Perry & Hugh McDonald)" (originally on Jammin' with Friends) | 3:44 |
| 19. | "Unskinny Bop (featuring The Sheilds Brothers, Bobby Capps, Frank Hannon & Robert Mason)" (originally on Jammin' with Friends) | 3:58 |
| 20. | "Something to Believe In" (Solo version originally on Freedom of Sound) | 4:52 |
| 21. | "Talk Dirty to Me (featuring Mark McGrath & Scot Coogan)" (originally on Jammin' with Friends) | 3:50 |
