= Jammin' with Friends =

Studio album by Bret Michaels
- Released: June 25, 2013
- Recorded: 2011–2013
- Genre: Rock, country rock
- Length: 73:50
- Label: Poor Boy Records

Bret Michaels chronology
Custom Built (2010)	Jammin' with Friends (2013)	True Grit (2015)

Singles from Jammin' with Friends
- 1. "Get Your Rock On" Released: January 9, 2012; 2. "Get Your Ride On" Released: January 10, 2012; 3. "Nothin' But a Good Time" Released: May 15, 2012; 4. "The App Song" Released: August 30, 2012; 5. "You Know You Want It" Released: January 29, 2013

Jammin' with Friends is the fourth studio album by American musician Bret Michaels, lead singer of the rock band Poison. The album was released on June 25, 2013, by Poor Boy Records. The album is Michaels' first album since 2010's Custom Built. The album charted at number #13 on the Top Hard Rock Albums, #23 on the Top Independent Albums, #29 on the Top Rock Albums and #80 on The Billboard 200.

== Background ==
The album has undergone various name and release date changes and was long in the making, initially titled after the single "Get Your Rock On" which was released more than a year before the album's final release date, then it was changed to "Good Songs & Great Friends" but eventually titled Jammin' With Friends.

The album is also referred to as a "Bret Michaels and friends album", bringing together friends that Michaels has made throughout his career with some of the songs that have shaped his success, featuring collaborations with some of the top artists and players in music from a variety of genres and generations. The album follows on in a similar theme from Michaels 2000 release "Show Me Your Hits" featuring re-recorded alternate versions of Poison and Michaels solo tracks that includes guest musicians.

During the making of this album, Michaels reappeared in the Celebrity Apprentice All Stars series as the only previous winner competing and in May 2013, Michaels began hosting the reality TV show, Rock My RV on the U.S. cable network, Travel Channel,

== Content ==
The album features four new original songs, two new cover songs and eight newly re-recorded songs of Poison classics/Michaels solo tracks, all of which feature guest musicians. The album also contains six previously released songs featuring guest musicians from past albums.

The lead-off single from the album, a new song "Get Your Rock On" featuring Phil Collen and Sal Costa, was released January 9, 2012 and features a music video which was mostly recorded during a New Year's Eve concert from the 'Get Your Rock On' Solo tour. The concert took place in Springfield, Illinois, at the Prairie Capital Convention Center.

In conjunction with the first single, an alternate version titled "Get Your Ride On" featuring Phil Collen was released on January 10, 2012. The song served as Monster Energy AMA Supercross Opener on Speed with an exclusive video that premiered on SPEED TV January 7, 2012. The video was customized for each race throughout the season.

A re-recorded version of "Nothin' But a Good Time" featuring Ace Frehley and Michael Anthony was also released as a single. The song includes two new versions of the classic hit both appearing on the album.

Another new song titled "They Don't Make An App For That (The App Song)", was released as a single through Michaels' official Bret Michaels App in August 2012. The song is a fun, tongue-in-cheek country crossover tune that takes on today's social media culture. "The App Song" also features a teaser video. In January, 2013, Michaels released the fifth single, the new song "You Know You Want It" featuring Peter Keys.

The album's new cover songs include "Sweet Home Alabama" originally recorded by Lynyrd Skynyrd and "Margaritaville" originally recorded by Jimmy Buffett and among the newly re-recorded Poison classics is the Billboard Hot 100 number-one single, "Every Rose Has Its Thorn" featuring the "Queen of Country Music" Loretta Lynn.

== Track listing ==
No.	Title	Length
1.	"Nothin' but a Good Time" (featuring Ace Frehley & Michael Anthony)	4:05
2.	"Sweet Home Alabama" (featuring Rickey Medlocke, Gary Rossington, Bobby Capps & Peter Keys)	4:08
3.	"Talk Dirty to Me" (featuring Mark McGrath & Scot Coogan)	3:50
4.	"Get Your Rock On" (featuring Phil Collen & Sal Costa)	3:15
5.	"Unskinny Bop" (featuring The Sheilds Brothers, Bobby Capps, Frank Hannon & Robert Mason)	3:58
6.	"The App Song" (featuring Brian Nutter, Jimmy Buffett & Bobby Capps)	3:23
7.	"Every Rose Has Its Thorn" (featuring Loretta Lynn, Bobby Capps, Joe Perry & Hugh McDonald)	3:44
8.	"Raine" (featuring Edwin McCain) (originally on Freedom of Sound)	3:53
9.	"Driven" (Extended Rock Mix) (featuring Leslie West, Jeffrey Steele & Eric Brittingham)	3:22
10.	"Nothing to Lose" (featuring Miley Cyrus) (originally on Custom Built)	3:55
11.	"What I Got" (featuring Jaret Reddick) (originally on Custom Built)	3:25
12.	"Go That Far (Hybrid Mix)" (featuring Jason Miller)	2:52
13.	"Fallen" (featuring Jimmy McGorman )	3:28
14.	"Party Rock Band" (featuring C.C. DeVille & Randy Castillo) (originally on A Letter From Death Row)	2:48
15.	"You Know You Want It" (featuring Peter Keys)	2:53
16.	"Margaritaville" (Recorded Live in Detroit) (featuring Jimmy Buffett)	5:12
17.	"Every Rose Has Its Thorn" (Country version) (featuring Brad Arnold, Chris Cagle, Mark Wills) (originally on Freedom of Sound)	4:19
18.	"Something to Believe In" (Solo version originally on Freedom of Sound)	4:52
19.	"Nothin' but a Good Time" (Classic Rock Version) (featuring Ace Frehley, Michael Anthony & The Sheilds Brothers)	4:06
20.	"Get Your Ride On" (AMA Supercross Theme) (featuring Phil Collen & Sal Costa)	2:01
Total length:		73:50

== Chart performance ==
Chart (2013)	Peak position
U.S. Billboard 200	80
U.S. Billboard Top Hard Rock Albums	13
U.S. Billboard Top Rock Albums	29
U.S. Billboard Top Independent Albums	23
