= A Letter from Death Row =

A Letter from Death Row may refer to:

- A Letter from Death Row (film), a 1998 psychological thriller film
- A Letter from Death Row (album), the 1998 soundtrack by Bret Michaels to the film of the same name
