= Custom Built =

Studio album by Bret Michaels
- Released: July 6, 2010
- Genre: Rock, country rock
- Length: 42:45
- Label: Poor Boy Records

Bret Michaels chronology
Rock My World (2008)	Custom Built (2010)	Jammin' with Friends (2013)

Singles from Custom Built
- 1. "Nothing to Lose" Released: March 2, 2010; 2. "Lie to Me" Released: April 20, 2010; 3. "Wasted Time" Released: May 7, 2010; 4. "What I Got" Released: 2010

Professional ratings
Review scores
Source	Rating
Allmusic	2.5/5 stars

Custom Built is the third studio album by American musician Bret Michaels, lead singer of the rock band Poison. It was released on July 6, 2010 and is Michaels' first studio album since 2005's Freedom of Sound. Announced on Michaels' Facebook, due to his recovery period, the album had been moved to July 6, 2010.

== Background ==
During the making of this album, Michaels was on the TV reality show Celebrity Apprentice 3 on NBC and was announced the winner on May 23, 2010.

The album is Michaels highest charting solo album to date peaking at #1 on both the Top Independent Albums and Top Hard Rock Albums chart and also charting at #4 on the Top Rock Albums and #14 on The Billboard 200.

== Content ==
The album features eight new tracks including four singles, The lead-off single from the album, "Nothing to Lose", features pop singer Miley Cyrus and was the most added song to radio the week of its release, topping both Bon Jovi and Nickelback. A second single, "Lie to Me", was issued in April 2010, followed by a third single in May, "Wasted Time". A cover of Sublime's single "What I Got" was eventually released as the fourth single of the album and features a music video which is a special tribute to his fans and was released on Thanksgiving.

The first track on the album, also a new song titled "Riding Against the Wind" is the theme song to the new Bret Michaels reality Docu-series Bret Michaels: Life As I Know It, the new series which is a follow-up to the Rock of Love series will premiere in Fall 2010, following the album's release. A music video was produced for "Riding Against the Wind" containing footage from Bret Michaels: Life As I Know It, which officially premieres on VH1 on Oct. 18, 2010. The music video was released on October 7, 2010 exclusively at Billboard's.

Also included is a solo version of the first single "Nothing to Lose" and remixed versions of "Driven" and "Go That Far", which was the theme song to Michaels' Rock of Love series. The original versions of "Go That Far" and "Driven" featured on his last album release, the compilation, Rock My World in 2008. The remixed version of "Driven" was released as a digital only single in 2008, following the release of "Rock My World" and has never featured on a full music album until now.

Also included on the album are four bonus previously released tracks including the country music version of Poison's Billboard Hot 100 number-one single, "Every Rose Has Its Thorn" originally included on his country rock album Freedom of Sound.

The digital version of the album features two extra bonus tracks which are the explicit versions of "Lie to Me" and "What I Got".

== Track listing ==
1. "Riding Against the Wind" (Bret Michaels: Life As I Know It Theme)
2. "Lie to Me"
3. "Nothing to Lose" (featuring Miley Cyrus) - 3:55
4. "Wasted Time"
5. "What I Got" (Bud Gaugh, Bradley Nowell, Half Pint, Eric Wilson)
6. "Every Rose Has Its Thorn" (country version featuring Brad Arnold of 3 Doors Down, Chris Cagle, Mark Wills)
7. "Go That Far (Club Mix)" (mixed by Jason Miller of Godhead)
8. "Driven" (Rock Mix) (featuring Mike Himmel on guitar)
9. "Open Road" (Originally from the album Freedom of Sound)
10. "Rock' n My Country" (Originally from the album Freedom of Sound)
11. "Nothing to Lose" (solo version)
12. "I'd Die for You" (Originally from the album A Letter from Death Row)
13. "Lie to Me" (Explicit) - Bonus track on digital album
14. "What I Got" (Explicit) - Bonus track on digital album

== Charts ==
Album

Chart (2010)	Peak position
U.S. Billboard 200	14
U.S. Billboard Top Hard Rock Albums	1
U.S. Billboard Top Rock Albums	4
U.S. Billboard Top Independent Albums	1
Canadian Albums Chart	44

Singles

Single	Chart (2010)	Peak position
"Nothing to Lose" (featuring Miley Cyrus)	U.S. Billboard Top Rock Digital Songs	32
"Wasted Time"	U.S. Billboard Top Rock Digital Songs	100
