= Bret Michaels =

American musician (born 1963)

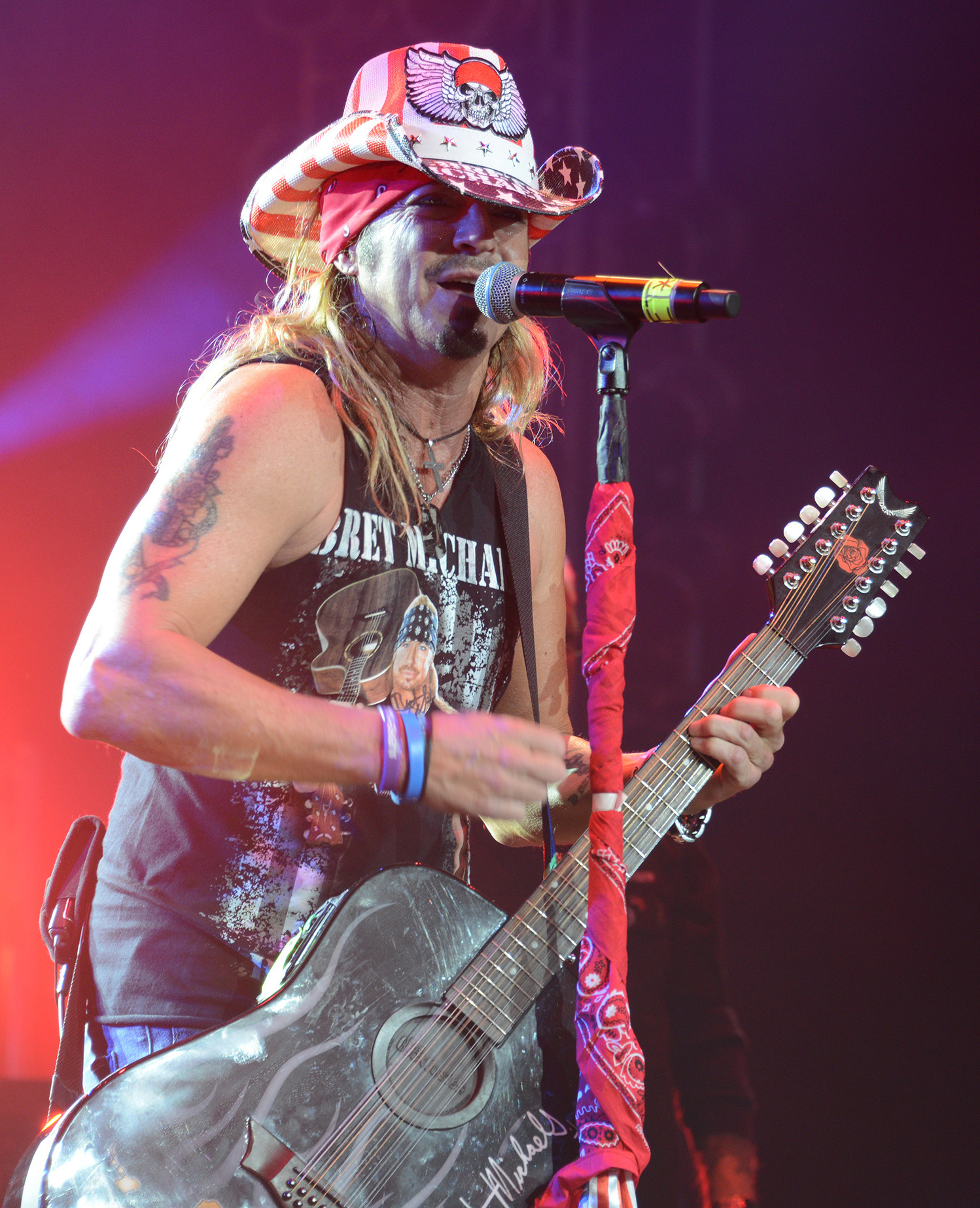
- Michaels performing at Tyson Events Center in 2019

Background information
- Born: Bret Michael Sychak; March 15, 1963 (age 63); Butler, Pennsylvania, U.S.
- Genres: Hard rock; glam metal; country rock; blues rock
- Occupations: Singer; musician; songwriter; actor
- Instruments: Vocals; guitar
- Years active: 1983–present
- Labels: Capitol; Cyanide Music Inc.; VH1 Classic
- Member of: Poison
- Website: bretmichaels.com

Bret Michael Sychak (born March 15, 1963), known professionally as Bret Michaels, is an American rock musician. He is the frontman of Poison, which has sold over 65 million albums worldwide and 30 million records in the United States. The band has also charted 10 singles to the Top 40 of the Billboard Hot 100, including six Top 10 singles and a number-one single, "Every Rose Has Its Thorn".

Besides his career as frontman, he has several solo albums to his credit, including the soundtrack album to the 1998 film A Letter from Death Row in which Michaels starred, wrote and directed, and a rock album, Songs of Life, in 2003. Michaels has appeared in several films and TV shows, including as a judge on the talent show Nashville Star which led to his country influenced rock album Freedom of Sound in 2005. He starred in the hit VH1 reality show Rock of Love with Bret Michaels and its sequels, which inspired his successful solo album Rock My World. He was also the winning contestant on NBC's reality show Celebrity Apprentice 3 and also featured in his own reality docuseries Bret Michaels: Life as I Know It, which inspired his highest-charting album as a solo artist, Custom Built, reaching No. 1 on Billboard's Hard Rock chart. He is also known for hosting Rock My RV with Bret Michaels on the Travel Channel. In 2006, Hit Parader ranked Michaels at No. 40 on their list of greatest heavy metal singers of all time.

== Early life ==
Michaels was born Bret Michael Sychak on March 15, 1963, to Wally and Marjorie Sychak, north of Pittsburgh in the town of Chicora, Pennsylvania, and grew up in Mechanicsburg, Pennsylvania. He attended Mechanicsburg Area Senior High School. He has two sisters, Michelle and Nicole. He claims that his parents had originally intended for him to have the middle name "Maverick", after the title character in the popular James Garner TV Western series Maverick. He is of Carpatho-Rusyn (from his paternal grandfather), Irish, English, German, and Swiss descent. Bret's great-uncle Nick Sychak fought at Omaha Beach in the Invasion of Normandy and was killed in action in France in 1944.

At the age of 6, Michaels fell ill, and during a three-week stay in the hospital, he was diagnosed with Type 1 diabetes.

== Music career ==
Michaels began playing the guitar as a teenager, forming a band with drummer Rikki Rockett, bass player Bobby Dall and guitarist David Besselman. Shortly thereafter, Besselman left the band due to creative differences and in 1983 the band hired Matt Smith to form a new band named Paris in Mechanicsburg, Pennsylvania. In early 1984 the band tired of playing the Pennsylvania bar circuit, changed their name to Poison and moved west to Los Angeles to seek fame on the Sunset Boulevard scene. That same year, Michaels met 16-year-old Tracy Lewis, who would become both his girlfriend and the muse for one of his most memorable songs. Eventually, Matt Smith tired of the band's struggle to find fame and returned home. He was replaced by C.C. DeVille, who would become both Michaels' friend and a source of conflict.

=== 1980s–1990s ===
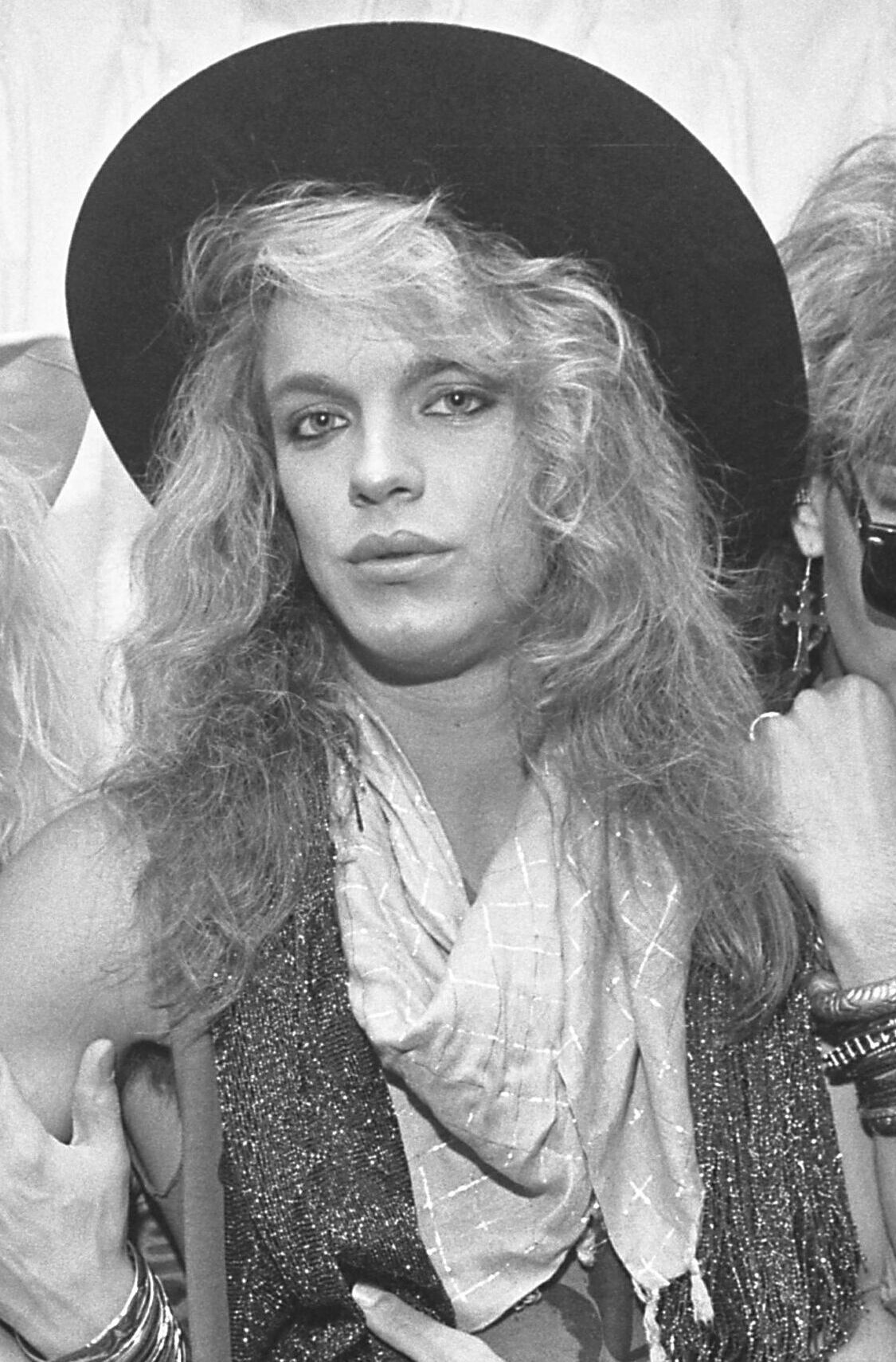
Michaels with Poison in 1986

Local publicity about the band eventually led to a record deal with Enigma Records, and their first album, Look What the Cat Dragged In. The album was not a great success until 1987, when Michaels convinced the band to film a video for their song, "Talk Dirty to Me". The album went platinum, and the band became famous. In March of that year, Poison headlined a show at Madison Square Garden. Michaels took his insulin injection before the show but was so nervous about performing that he neglected to eat. Several songs into Poison's set, Michaels went into insulin shock and collapsed onstage. When subsequent media reports alleged that Michaels collapsed due to a drug overdose, Michaels publicly announced that he was a diabetic.

1987 also saw the dissolution of his relationship with Lewis, who felt that fame had changed him. Though Michaels contends that Lewis was unfaithful to him, Lewis (now Lewis Crosby) insists that it was Michaels who was unfaithful. Michaels was inspired by the breakup to write "Every Rose Has Its Thorn", explaining that the rose represented his fame and success, whereas the loss of his relationship represented the thorn. The song was released as a power ballad single in December 1988, and is regarded as "the ultimate '80s anthem about heartbreak".

Throughout the 1980s and early 1990s, Poison became one of the biggest glam metal bands in the world, recording their second album, the multi-platinum selling Open Up and Say... Ahh!, and their third album, the multi-platinum selling Flesh & Blood. However, their lives were characterized by the escalating tension between Michaels and DeVille that derived from their mutual drug use, which came to a head during their 1990/91 "Flesh and Blood" world tour. Also cited is the spectacle of DeVille's behavior during the 1991 MTV Video Music Awards. After getting into a fistfight with Michaels, DeVille left the band, and descended further into addiction. Poison went on with new guitarist Richie Kotzen recording the Gold album Native Tongue and then with guitarist Blues Saraceno recording the album Crack a Smile... and More!. In the mid-1990s, after a night of partying, Michaels came close to dying when he crashed his Ferrari into a telephone pole. He incurred serious injury, including broken ribs, a disfigured nose, and lost teeth. In 1999, The band reunited with original guitarist, C.C. Deville. Poison went on a successful greatest hits reunion tour. In the next decade, Bret Michaels would split his time between Poison and a successful solo career.

=== 2000s ===
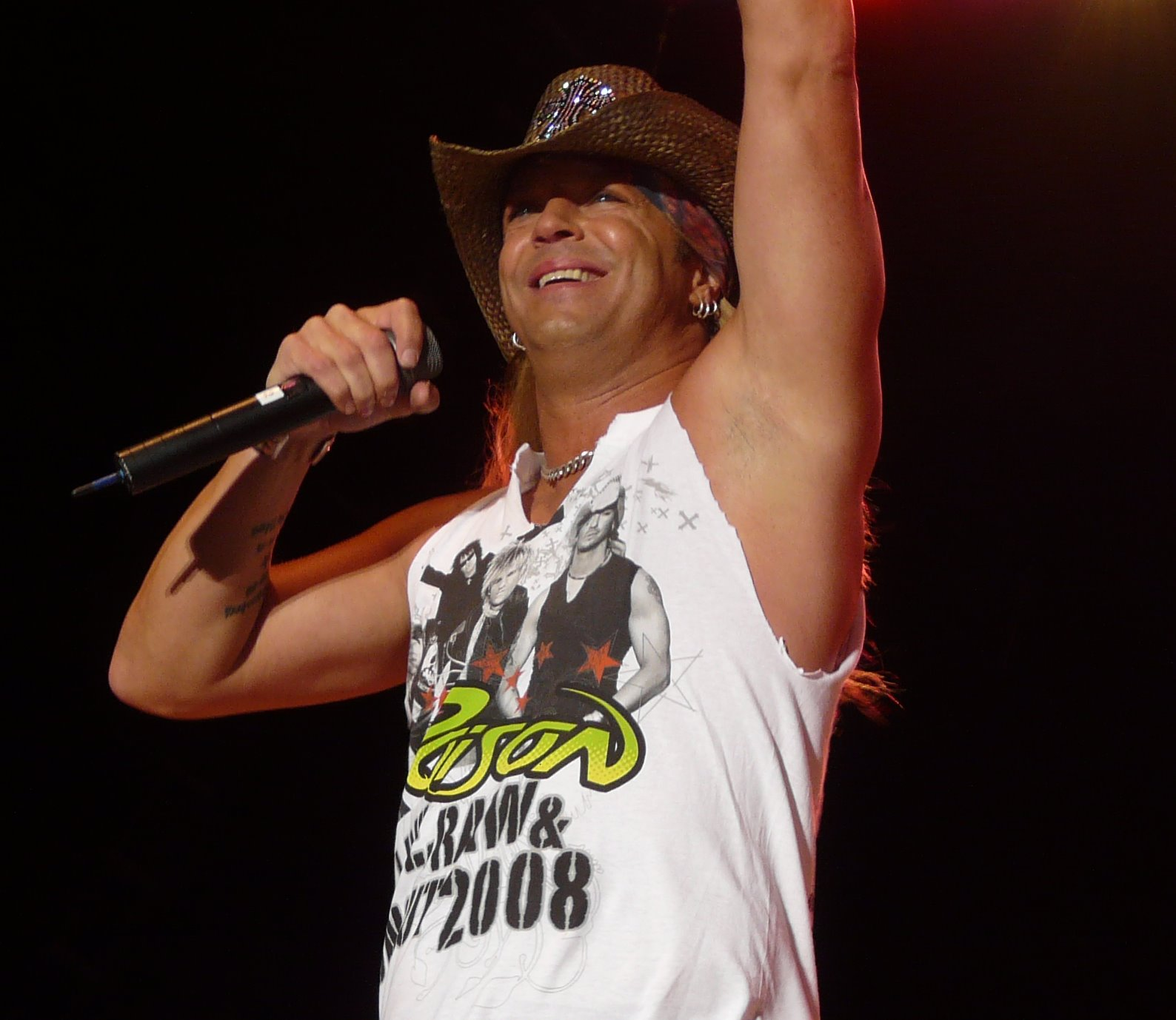
Michaels in 2008

Michaels recorded his soundtrack album in 1998 titled A Letter from Death Row which was the soundtrack to the same-titled movie he directed, wrote, and starred in. In 2000, Michaels, with the assistance of studio influencer Michael Blount, released a country demos ep and also released the album "Show Me Your Hits" which featured re-recorded Poison classics. The album featured Michaels performing Poison hits in a new way and also featured other artists with Michaels on selected tracks. In 2001 Michaels released a unique storytellers CD titled Ballads, Blues & Stories which featured Poison and Michaels solo tracks along with recorded stories about each song.

In 2003, Michaels released a brand new studio album Songs of Life which featured the singles "Raine" (dedicated to his daughter) and "Bittersweet". Michaels also released his first solo music video for the single "Raine" which was directed by award-winning director Shane Stanley. The album also featured a music video for "Menace to Society" and a 9/11 tribute "One More Day".

Michaels served as a judge on the 2005 season of the reality television singing competition Nashville Star and released a country rock album in the same year called Freedom of Sound. The album features the singles "Right Now, Right Here", "Open Road" which Michaels performed live on the show and the hit single "All I Ever Needed" (featuring Jessica Andrews) which appeared on Billboard's "Hot Country Songs" chart, with its best position being number 45. The song also featured a music video which appeared on Billboard's "Hot Videoclip Tracks" chart in 2008.

Michaels released a best of album called Rock My World in June 2008 which featured music from his reality television series Rock of Love including the new singles "Go That Far" (Rock of Love theme), "Fallen" and "Start Again", the first two singles also featuring music videos with clips from the series. The album charted at No. 40 on the Billboard 200, No. 4 on the Top Independent Albums, No. 4 on the Top Hard Rock Albums and No. 16 on the Top Rock Albums chart. In December 2008, Michaels released a single version of "Driven" (rock mix) which also featured a music video with preview clips for the third season of Rock of Love, titled Rock of Love Bus. Michaels also re released the "Fallen" single with acoustic, piano and demo versions included.

Michaels released a 30-minute DVD from Time Life in 2008 called Hard & Heavy Confidential featuring Bret Michaels which included acoustic versions of "All I Ever Needed", "Driven", "Every Rose Has Its Thorn" and "Something to Believe In", it also included in depth interviews. The DVD was included in the Hard & Heavy CD/DVD collection from (Time Life) advertised on TV by Bret Michaels. The same four acoustic performances were also released on CD titled "Bret Michaels Acoustic Sessions".

=== 2010–2014 ===
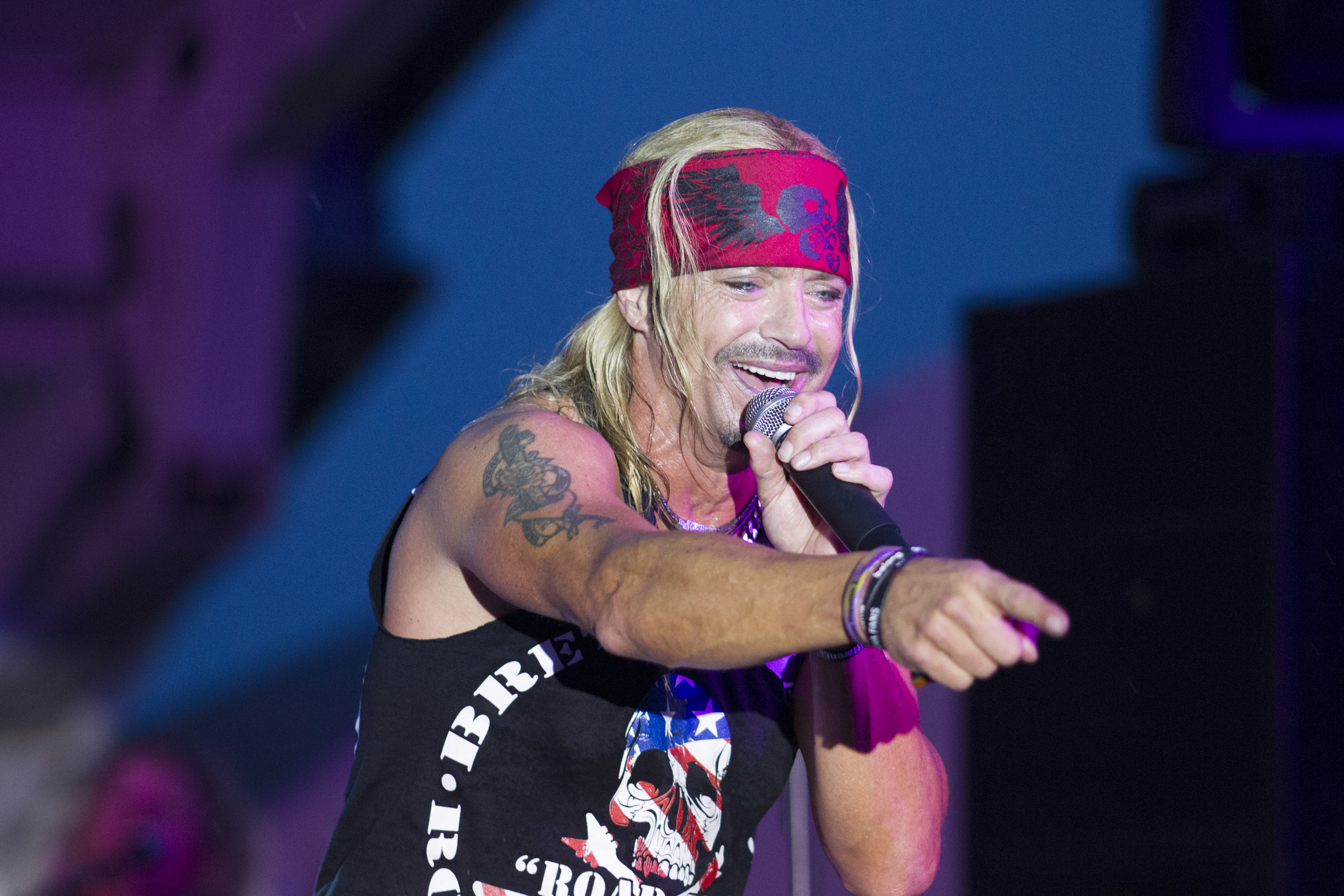
Michaels performs at John J. Burns Park in Massapequa, New York, 2014

In 2010, Michaels released a new single called "Nothing to Lose" from his upcoming new studio album, Custom Built. The song featured the guest vocals of Miley Cyrus and was the most added song to radio the week of its release, topping both Bon Jovi and Nickelback. In April 2010, he released the second single "Lie to Me" and in May 2010 released the third single, "Wasted Time".

Michaels performed on the American Idol season 9 finale on May 26 against his doctor's recommendation. Michaels also performed a duet of "Every Rose Has Its Thorn" with Miley Cyrus on the June 18, 2010 episode Good Morning America.

On July 6, 2010, Michaels released his new album Custom Built. The album became Michaels' highest charting solo album to date peaking at No. 1 on both the Top Independent Albums and Top Hard Rock Albums chart and also charting at No. 4 on the Top Rock Albums and No. 14 on the Billboard 200.

On August 4, 2010, Michaels appeared in the fifth season of America's Got Talent and performed "Every Rose Has Its Thorn", accompanying himself on acoustic folk guitar.

Despite not being released as a single, a music video was produced for "Riding Against the Wind" a song from Michaels' latest album "Custom Built" that also doubles as the theme song for his new VH1 reality show Bret Michaels: Life As I Know It. The music video was released on October 7, 2010, exclusively at Billboard's and contains footage from the series, which officially premieres on VH1 on October 18, 2010. Michaels also released a music video for the cover of Sublime's song "What I Got", which is the fourth single from "Custom Built". The music video is a special tribute to his fans and was released on Thanksgiving.

In early 2011 Michaels recorded a new song "Hit and Roll" for Top Gear (U.S. TV series) which also included a music video featured on the series and the promo commercials.

On December 31, 2011, Michaels celebrated the new year with a New Year's Eve concert from the "Get Your Rock On" solo tour. The concert took place in Springfield, IL at the Prairie Capital Convention Center. To make the night complete, this New Year's Eve bash will be featured and well documented in the music video for the new single "Get Your Rock On" from Bret's upcoming new album. The single "Get Your Rock On (featuring Phil Collen & Sal Costa)" was released January 9, 2012.

In conjunction with his new single Michaels also released an alternate version titled "Get Your Ride On (featuring Phil Collen)" on January 10, 2012. The song will also serve as Monster Energy AMA Supercross Opener all season on Speed with an exclusive video that premiered on SPEED TV January 7, 2012. The video will be customized for each race throughout the season.

Michaels toured with Def Leppard and Lita Ford in 2012. In August 2012 Michaels released a new single "They Don't Make An App For That (The App Song)" through Michaels' official Bret Michaels App. The song is a fun, tongue-in-cheek country crossover tune that takes on today's social media culture. "The App Song" features a teaser video.

In January 2013, Michaels released a new single "You Know You Want It (Featuring Peter Keys)" from his upcoming new album titled "Jammin' With Friends". The new album features collaborations with some of the top artists and players in music from a variety of genres and generations. The album was released June 25, 2013 and charted at No. 13 on the Top Hard Rock Albums chart, #23 on the Top Independent Albums chart, #29 on the Top Rock Albums chart and #80 on The Billboard 200.

On April 1, 2014, Michaels released his new solo single, "A Beautiful Soul", with a music video being released on April 2. Michaels announced that he will perform the track live on the April 2 edition of "Oprah's Lifeclass" which will be taped live on Oprah's website.

Also in 2014, Michaels starred in a TV commercial for Nissan vans in which he sang "Endless Love", backed by Kiki Wong on lead guitar.

=== 2015–present ===
On April 7, 2015, Michaels released a new song titled "Girls on Bars", making it the second year in a row he released a new song during the month of April. The song was co-written with Luke Laird. "Girls on Bars" boasted the highest number of views of any debut single ever on CMT.

On April 9, 2015, Michaels released a compilation album of his solo recordings titled True Grit which included three new songs. The record was released digitally May 5, 2015. The video for lead the single named "Girls On Bars" was released on May 12. The album in physical was exclusively released in own distribution.

In May 2017, Michaels released a single and music video titled "Jorja Bleu" which is a tribute to his youngest daughter in honor of her 12th birthday. The song is a sequel to his 2003 single "Raine" which is titled after his oldest daughter.

In 2019, Michaels released a music video for his single "Unbroken", which was co written with his 13-year-old daughter, Jorja Bleu. The song is about mental and physical strength over adversity.

In May 2020, he released his autobiography named Bret Michaels: Auto-Scrap-ography Volume 1: My Life in Pictures & Stories, announced as the first in a series of trilogies. As said by Michaels, its release was planned under a different name since 2010, but kept being pushed back to include more content. More recently, he had signed a deal with the United Talent Agency.

In December 2022, Michaels announced the 2023 Parti-Gras Tour which performed between July 13 and August 6, 2023. Along with Michaels, the tour included Jefferson Starship and Night Ranger with appearances by Steve Augeri of Journey and Mark McGrath of Sugar Ray. Parti-Gras 2.0 kicked off in 2024 with special guests including solo artists Dee Snider, Lou Gramm and Don Felder and bands Slaughter (band) and Warrant. Parti-Gras returned again in 2025 with Vince Neil and Stephen Pearcy.

In January 2023, Michaels released a new solo single named "Back in the Day"

== Rock of Love ==
Michaels starred in the reality television dating competition series Rock of Love with Bret Michaels, the first season of which premiered in July 2007. Jes Rickleff was the winner of Season One. However, she announced during the October 2007 reunion show that she and Michaels were not right for each other and told runner-up Heather he was all hers and that he should have chosen Heather. The first season was released on DVD in early 2008.

The show's second season premiered on January 13, 2008. On April 13, 2008, Michaels selected Ambre Lake as his "Rock of Love". After the show the two maintained a relationship, but parted ways after just a few months due to personal commitments, but they remain good friends.

A third season, Rock of Love Bus, premiered on January 4, 2009, to ratings which represented a series high for VH1. Michaels chose Penthouse Pet Taya Parker as the winner. When asked about a fourth season of Rock of Love, Michaels said "Now they want me to come back for a fourth 'Rock of Love.' I feel that it should be something that changes up, but I still want that fun element. What you see is what you get with me."

== Television and film appearances ==
Michaels and actor Charlie Sheen established a film production company, Sheen/Michaels Entertainment, which produced the movie A Letter from Death Row (1998), in which Michaels wrote, directed and starred, and for which he released a soundtrack album. They also produced No Code of Conduct that same year, which Michaels also directed and acted in. Their company also produced the feature film Free Money, starring Marlon Brando and Mira Sorvino, and the surfer movie In God's Hands in which Michaels also had a small acting role.

Michaels appeared in the CBS sitcom Yes, Dear, Season 1, Episode 6, titled Greg's Big Day, first aired November 6, 2000. He also appeared as himself in three episodes of The Chris Isaak Show from 2001 to 2004.

On May 1, 2008, Michaels appeared on a special celebrity edition of Don't Forget the Lyrics!, on which he raised $200,000 to donate to charity.

In 2010, Michaels was the winning contestant on the NBC reality television series Celebrity Apprentice 3 on NBC.

Michaels stars in a series named Bret Michaels: Life As I Know It, which depicts his life at home with his daughters and their mother. Filming of the series began before Michaels' health troubles, and filming was suspended after his hospitalization. VH1 aired a preview of the series on May 31, 2010, and the series aired in fall 2010.

Michaels hosted the Miss Universe 2010 pageant along with Natalie Morales on August 23, 2010.

In 2020, Michaels competed in the third season of The Masked Singer as "Banana". He ended up in seventh place on April 22, 2020.

In 2022, Michaels made a special guest appearance on Season 29 of Food Network's Guy's Grocery Games in the 8th episode "Craziest Day in Flavortown". Michaels judged the first of two rounds of the episode, and also presented a gift to Guy Fieri's eldest son, Hunter Fieri, as his 25th birthday present.

In 2023, Michaels appeared as a guest on the tenth season of Impractical Jokers. He participated in the punishment for Murr.

== In other media ==
Michaels was portrayed as a guest singer in the video game Guitar Hero III: Legends of Rock, which features him singing "Go That Far" from his solo career, and Poison's "Talk Dirty to Me".

== Charity work ==
Michaels and his band visited troops at Al Asad Air Base on October 6, 2007, while on a tour of U.S. bases in Iraq in support of Armed Forces Entertainment.

Bret Michaels has done extensive work for Operation Homefront- a charity that provides emergency financial and other assistance to the families of service members and wounded warriors.

He earned $640,000 for the American Diabetes Association for competing in and ultimately winning Celebrity Apprentice 3.

In June, 2014, while on a national tour date in Omaha, Nebraska, Michaels became aware of a series of tornadoes that hit the Nebraska town of Pilger. He, his band, and crew, went to Pilger to see the damage and assist with clean-up. When his tour came near the area again in August, 2014, he hosted a fundraising performance in Norfolk, Nebraska, to help tornado victims in the area.

== Personal life ==
While filming the finale of his reality show, Bret Michaels: Life As I Know It, Michaels proposed to Kristi Lynn Gibson, his on-again, off-again companion of 16 years. In July 2012, he announced that he and Gibson had separated. The pair have two daughters together.

Michaels has a line of pet clothing and accessories called Pets Rock, sold at PetSmart. In October 2023, he adopted a husky named Bret Michaels from the Nebraska Humane Society, after reading a story about the dog providing a blood transfusion to a sick kitten.

On May 20, 2010, it was reported on his official website that Michaels had been "readmitted to the hospital the week after suffering numbness on the left side of his body". While conducting diagnostic tests it was found that Michaels has a "patent foramen ovale (PFO), a hole in the heart". It was further reported that his condition is "operable and treatable" and his doctors believe they "have diagnosed the problem that caused the transient ischemic attack (TIA) or warning stroke", but that they "feel it is highly unlikely this is connected to the brain hemorrhage he suffered just a few weeks earlier". On October 11, 2011, Michaels commented on his 2010 health scare with the following: "2010 was, without question, a roller coaster year for me. But when you have an amazing family, and you still have a lot of music left to make, and you have such incredible and supportive fans behind you, you're going to fight until the very last breath before you throw in that towel."

=== Lawsuit with Tony Awards and CBS ===
Michaels was injured during his opening performance at the 63rd Tony Awards on June 7, 2009. As he was ending his performance with Poison and exiting to the stage rear, a large portion of the descending set struck him on the head and knocked him down. The initial injury reported was a broken nose. However, the hemorrhage incident in 2010 prompted Michaels to file a lawsuit for unspecified damages against the Tony Awards and CBS claiming the incident caused the hemorrhage. On May 14, 2012, the parties announced that they had agreed to settle the lawsuit for an undisclosed amount. Michaels thanked the Barrow Neurological Institute at St. Joseph's Hospital and Medical Center in Phoenix for saving his life and career.

== Discography ==
Studio albums

- Songs of Life (2003)
- Freedom of Sound (2005)
- Custom Built (2010)
- Jammin' with Friends (2013)

== Filmography ==
Film and television
Year	Title	Role/Notes			
1994	Burke's Law	TV series, 1 episode			
1997	Free Money	Producer			
1998	In God's Hands	Phillips			
1998	A Letter from Death Row	Michael Raine, also writer, director and producer			
1998	The World's Greatest Magic 5				
1998–	No Code of Conduct	director			
1999	High Tension, Low Budget	Documentary (The Making of a Letter from Death Row)			
1999	Martial Law	TV series, 1 episode			
1999–2009	Behind the Music	as himself; 3 episodes			
2000	Yes, Dear	as himself			
2002	The Making of Bret Michaels	Documentary			
2002	I Love the '80s	as himself; 10 episodes			
2003	I Love the '70s	as himself			
2004	I Love the '90s	as himself			
2005	I Love the '90s: Part Deux	as himself			
2005	Nashville Star	Season 3 judge			
2006	Heavy: The Story of Metal	as himself; Documentary miniseries			
2007	Rock of Love with Bret Michaels	TV series			
2008	Rock of Love 2	TV series			
2008	Don't Forget The Lyrics	Fox TV			
2008	Ellen-Fox Shows	February 14, 2008			
2008	Saturday Night Live				
2008	VH1's "100 Greatest Hard Rock Songs"	Host (5-part special; December 2008 – January 2009)			
2009	Rock of Love Bus with Bret Michaels	TV series			
2009	E! True Hollywood Story	as himself; Episode: "Bret Michaels"			
2009	The Penguins of Madagascar	singing "Wheels of Thunder" in Little Zoo Coupe			
2009	American Pie Presents: The Book of Love	as himself			
2010	The Celebrity Apprentice	as himself			
2010	Behind the Music: Remastered	as himself; Episode: "Poison"			
2010	Bret Michaels: Life As I Know It	as himself			
2011	Extreme Makeover: Home Edition	as himself			
2012	The High Fructose Adventures of Annoying Orange	as himself			
2013	The Celebrity Apprentice: All-Stars	as himself			
2013	Rock My RV with Bret Michaels	-	2013	Full Throttle Saloon	as himself
2014	Revolution	Season 2, Ep. 13 as himself			
2014	I Love the 2000s	as himself; 10 episodes			
2016	Pawn Stars	Season 12 Ep. 33 Every Rose Has Its Pawn as himself			
2017	Sharknado 5: Global Swarming	as himself			
2020	The Masked Singer	Banana			
2020	Impractical Jokers: Dinner Party	Episode: "The Food Ya Never Ate Episode" as himself			
2021	Behind the Music	Recorded new interviews for the updated version of his episode from the original Behind the Music			
2022	Guy's Grocery Games	Episode: "Craziest Day in Flavortown" as himself; special guest judge			
2024	Nöthin' But a Good Time: The Uncensored Story of '80s Hair Metal	as himself			

=== Music videos ===
Year	Song	Artist	Notes
1986	"Cry Tough"	Poison	
1987	"Talk Dirty to Me"	Poison	
1987	"I Want Action"	Poison	
1988	"Nothin' But a Good Time"	Poison	
1988	"Fallen Angel"	Poison	
1988	"Every Rose Has Its Thorn"	Poison	
1989	"Your Mama Don't Dance"	Poison	
1990	"Unskinny Bop"	Poison	
1990	"Something to Believe In"	Poison	
1991	"Ride the Wind"	Poison	
1991	"Life Goes On"	Poison	
1991	"(Flesh & Blood) Sacrifice"	Poison	
1991	"So Tell Me Why"	Poison	
1993	"Stand"	Poison	
1993	"Until You Suffer Some (Fire and Ice)"	Poison	
2003	"Raine"	Bret Michaels	
2003	"Menace to Society"	Bret Michaels	Live montage video
2005	"All I Ever Needed"	Bret Michaels	2nd version with Iraq footage released in 2008
2006	"We're an American Band"	Poison	
2007	"What I Like About You"	Poison	
2008	"Go That Far" (Rock of Love theme)"	Bret Michaels	3 versions – with Rock of Love clips, with live clips and standard with no clips
2008	"Fallen"	Bret Michaels	2 versions – with and without Rock of Love clips
2008	"Driven (Rock Mix)"	Bret Michaels	cut and uncut versions
2010	"Riding Against the Wind" (Bret Michaels: Life As I Know It Theme)	Bret Michaels	
2010	"What I Got"	Bret Michaels	
2011	"Hit and Roll" (Top Gear (U.S. TV series) Theme)	Bret Michaels	
2012	"Get Your Rock On"	Bret Michaels	
2012	"Get Your Ride On" (AMA Supercross Theme)	Bret Michaels	
2012	"The App Song"	Bret Michaels	Video Montage
2014	"A Beautiful Soul"	Bret Michaels	
2015	"Girls on Bars"	Bret Michaels	
2017	"Jorja Bleu"	Bret Michaels	
2019	"Unbroken"	Bret Michaels	
2023	"Back in the Day"	Bret Michaels	

Preceded by Joan Rivers	The Apprentice Winners; Season 9 (Celebrity Edition 3)	Succeeded by Brandy Kuentzel
