= Ballads, Blues & Stories =

Compilation album by Bret Michaels
- Released: August 8, 2001
- Genre: Rock, blues rock
- Label: Poor Boy Records

Bret Michaels chronology
| Country Demos (2000) | Ballads, Blues & Stories (2001) | Songs of Life (2003) |

Ballads, Blues & Stories is a unique storytellers music CD from Bret Michaels, the lead singer of the rock band Poison. Released in 2001 it consists of Bret Michaels' solo music and Poison songs, with a recorded story before each song, about how the songs were created and written.

== Content ==
The album features new songs "It's Me Your Talking To", "Stay With Me" and "Walk Away" along with an unreleased demo "The Other Side of Me" and new solo versions of the Poison hit singles "Every Rose Has Its Thorn" and "Something to Believe In".

The CD contains 20 tracks in total which includes 10 tracks of stories from Michaels talking about the songs.

== Track listing ==
1. "Every Rose Has Its Thorn" - (New solo version)
2. "Steel Bar Blues" - (from the album A Letter from Death Row)
3. "Walk Away" - (New track, also later released on the studio album Freedom of Sound)
4. "The Devil Inside" - (from the album A Letter from Death Row)
5. "Stay With Me" - (New track, also later released on the studio album Songs of Life)
6. "Something to Believe In" - (New solo version) (also later released on the studio album Freedom of Sound)
7. "Times Like These" - (from the album A Letter from Death Row)
8. "It's Me You're Talking To" (New Track)
9. "The Other Side of Me" - (demo from the Country Demos EP)
10. "The Last Breath" - (from the album A Letter from Death Row)
