= Go That Far =

Single by Bret Michaels

from the album Rock My World
- Released: February 27, 2007
- Recorded: 2007
- Genre: Hard rock
- Length: 2:53
- Label: Poor Boy Records
- Songwriter: Bret Michaels

Bret Michaels singles chronology
| "Open Road" (2005) | "Go That Far" (2007) | "Fallen" (2007) |

"Go That Far" is a song written by Bret Michaels, and was recorded by Michaels as the first single for his compilation album, Rock My World released in 2008. "Go That Far" is the theme song for VH1's highest rated reality series "Rock of Love with Bret Michaels" and the album "Rock My World" is the soundtrack to the series. The album charted at number 40 on The Billboard 200, number 4 on the Top Independent Albums, number 4 on the Top Hard Rock Albums and number 16 on the Top Rock Albums chart.

Bret Michaels won a 2008 BMI Award for "Go That Far".

== Music video ==
Directed by Shane Stanley "Go That Far" features a music video which reached #1 on VH1. The music video features three different versions, Standard, with Rock of Love clips and with live concert clips.

== Guitar Hero ==
"Go That Far" is included in the game Guitar Hero III: Legends of Rock as a bonus song.

== Alternate version ==
A new version of "Go That Far" was released on the Bret Michaels studio album Custom Built, and was titled "Go That Far (Club Mix)", the song was mixed by Jason C. Miller of Godhead.
