= Rock My World (album) =

Compilation album by Bret Michaels
- Released: June 3, 2008
- Genre: Hard rock
- Length: 39:01
- Label: VH1 Classic Records

Bret Michaels chronology
Freedom of Sound (2005)	Rock My World (2008)	Custom Built (2010)

Singles from Rock My World
- 1. ""Go That Far" (Rock of Love theme)" Released: February 27, 2007; 2. "Fallen" Released: August 28, 2007; 3. "Start Again" Released: January 28, 2008; 4. "Driven (Rock mix)" Released: December 2, 2008

Professional ratings
Review scores
Source	Rating
PiercingMetal	3.5/5 stars

Rock My World is the fifth music album by rock artist, Poison vocalist and reality television star Bret Michaels. This album is a greatest hits compilation featuring songs from his last two studio albums and also features three new tracks plus a remixed track. All the music heard during his reality television shows Rock of Love (2007) and Rock of Love 2 (2008) is on the album.

== Release and promotion ==
The album was originally expected to be released following the first season of Rock of Love but held back due to the second season. The album was released in June 2008 following the completion of the second season. The sold out solo tour began in April 2008.

The album charted at #40 on the Billboard 200, #4 on the Top Independent Albums, #4 on the Top Hard Rock Albums and #16 on the Top Rock Albums chart.

== Content ==
The first single, "Go That Far", is the theme song for the Rock of Love series and is included in the game Guitar Hero III: Legends of Rock as the only song with a four-note chord at the time, on the rhythm guitar part at bridge 2 solo. It also features a music video which reached #1 on VH1. The music video features 3 different versions, Standard, with Rock of Love clips and with live concert clips.

The second single, "Fallen", was also heard on Rock of Love and features a music video with 2 different versions, one with clips from the Rock of Love series and another with no clips, the song was also released as a maxi single with piano, acoustic and piano with acoustic versions.

The song "Start Again" was released as the third single of the album which also features a remixed version of the track "It's My Party" originally released on the Songs of Life album.

"Driven" which was originally released on Freedom of Sound, was also released as a single for the album, to promote the 3rd season of Rock of Love called Rock of Love Bus, which started in early 2009, following the album's release. The song also features a music video with clips from Rock of Love's third season. The single is a remixed version (Rock mix) of the track that features on the album.

A second alternate music video was also released for the song "All I Ever Needed" which features Bret Michaels in Iraq footage.

== Rock of Love ==
Rock of Love is an American reality television dating game show starring Bret Michaels and featured three seasons on VH1. The series was VH1's highest rated reality TV series.

"You rock my world" was the famous phrase Bret would say to the contestants that he really liked and this eventually became the title of the album. The new songs from the album were written and recorded during the Rock of Love series and the album has been referred to as the "Rock of Love Soundtrack".

== Track listing ==
1. "Go That Far" (Rock of Love Theme) - 2:53
2. "Driven" (from the album Freedom of Sound) - 3:03
3. "Fallen" - 3:43
4. "Raine" (from the album Songs of Life) - 3:54
5. "Bittersweet" (from the album Songs of Life) - 3:23
6. "Start Again" - 3:17
7. "Songs of Life" (from the album Songs of Life) - 3:14
8. "Strange Sensation" (from the album Songs of Life) - 2:57
9. "All I Ever Needed" (from the album Freedom of Sound) - 3:31
10. "Menace to Society" (from the album Songs of Life) - 2:49
11. "Right Now, Right Here" (from the album Freedom of Sound) - 3:24
12. "It's My Party" (2008 Mix) - 3:00

== Chart performance ==
Chart (2008)	Peak position
U.S. Billboard 200	40
U.S. Billboard Top Hard Rock Albums	4
U.S. Billboard Top Rock Albums	16
U.S. Billboard Top Independent Albums	4
