= Bret Michaels: Life as I Know It =

- Genre: Documentary
- Created by: Bret Michaels; Cris Abrego; Mark Cronin
- Starring: Bret Michaels
- Opening theme: "Riding Against the Wind" by Bret Michaels
- Country of origin: United States
- Original language: English
- No. of seasons: 1
- No. of episodes: 9

Production
- Executive producers: Ben Samek; Bret Michaels; Cris Abrego; Jeff Olde; Jill Holmes; Kristen Kelly; Leah Horwitz; Mark Cronin; Matt Odgers
- Running time: 21 to 22 minutes
- Production company: 51 Minds Entertainment

Original release
- Network: VH1
- Release: October 18 – December 20, 2010

Related
- Rock of Love with Bret Michaels

Bret Michaels: Life as I Know It is an American reality documentary television series on VH1 that debuted October 18, 2010 and aired weekly episodes at 10:30 p.m. on Mondays. It is the series following Rock of Love and chronicles the lives of Bret Michaels and his family. Filming of the series began before Michaels' health troubles, and filming was suspended after his hospitalization. Production resumed when it was cleared by his doctors. The pilot for the series aired on May 31, 2010, one week after Michaels was announced the winner of The Celebrity Apprentice 3 on NBC.

== Theme music ==
A music video was produced for "Riding Against the Wind" a song from Michaels' latest album Custom Built that also doubles as the theme song for Bret Michaels: Life As I Know It. The music video contains footage from the series and was released on October 7, 2010, exclusively on Billboard.

== Episodes ==
No.	Title	Original release date	U.S. viewers (millions)
0	"Pilot"	May 31, 2010	N/A
1	"Episode 1"	October 18, 2010	0.84
Watch as Bret juggles life on the road, his career, raising two kids and managing his on again off again relationship with their beautiful mom, Kristi.
2	"Episode 2"	October 25, 2010	0.37
Bret's back out on the road and showing no signs of slowing down despite girlfriend Kristi's concerns for his health. Things get hectic when he makes a pit stop back at home and has to switch gears from rocker to Poppa Rocka. When his parenting hits a sour note with his daughters, Bret finds out being a dad isn't as easy as playing sold out concerts to thousands of adoring fans.
3	"Episode 3"	November 1, 2010	0.36
When Bret brings Raine along to visit some children dealing with diabetes, he's reminded of what's important in life. Back out on the road and missing his daughters, Bret flies Kristi and the girls out to meet him in Pittsburgh, PA for a show. Life on tour turns out to be different with the family in tow.
4	"Episode 4"	November 8, 2010	0.43
The Michaels family is on the road and taking New York City by storm. Unfortunately, Bret's busy press schedule is starting to get in the way of all the family fun. Bret's no stranger to juggling work and family but when everyone in town starts talking about Kristi and wedding bells, Bret finds himself trying to explain why a promise ring isn't the same as an engagement ring.
5	"Episode 5"	November 15, 2010	0.59
Bret ponders getting engaged and asks for advice from his father.
6	"Episode 6"	November 22, 2010	0.47
Bret plays at a biker rally, where his self-control is tested, and he misses his daughters' first day of school.
7	"Episode 7"	November 29, 2010	0.39
Kristi and Bret have a romantic dinner and a pivotal conversation.
8	"Episode 8"	December 13, 2010	0.46
Bret talks to doctors about his pending heart surgery.
9	"Episode 9"	December 20, 2010	0.52
An anniversary sparks questions for Bret and Kristi. After a romantic dinner and a talk, Bret pops the big question
