= No Code of Conduct =

1998 American action crime thriller film

- Directed by: Bret Michaels
- Written by: Bret Michaels; Charlie Sheen; Shane Stanley; Bill Gucwa; Ed Masterson
- Produced by: Danny Dimbort; Charlie Sheen; Shane Stanley; Boaz Davidson; Avi Lerner; Elie Samaha; Trevor Short
- Starring: Charlie Sheen; Martin Sheen; Mark Dacascos
- Cinematography: Adam Kane
- Edited by: Shane Stanley
- Music by: Kyle Level; Bret Michaels
- Production company: Sheen Michaels Entertainment
- Distributed by: Nu Image Films
- Release date: 1998
- Running time: 95 minutes
- Country: United States
- Language: English
- Budget: $12,000,000

No Code of Conduct is a 1998 action crime thriller film directed by Bret Michaels and released through Sheen Michaels Entertainment a production company created by actor Charlie Sheen and Bret Michaels. The film stars Charlie Sheen, and Martin Sheen as father-and-son vice unit detectives, along with Mark Dacascos who portrays Charlie Sheen's partner. The film was released as a direct-to-video feature in some countries, including: Australia, Sweden, Japan, the Czech Republic, Argentina, Brazil, Azerbaijan, Russia and Turkey. Bret Michaels is credited as Director, Screenwriter, Composer (Music Score), Actor and Executive Producer. Charlie Sheen's credits in this release include Actor, Screenwriter and Executive Producer.

== Plot ==
Jake Peterson (Charlie Sheen) is a dedicated vice unit detective, whose strong-will and dedication to duty begins to take a toll on his marriage to wife Rebecca (Meredith Salenger). Jake's father, Bill Peterson (Martin Sheen) is a veteran detective in the same unit as Jake. As well as the strain of a troubled marriage, Jake is also under pressure to live up to his father's reputation. After the death of a fellow detective, both Jake and his father make it their personal mission to bring the killer or killers to justice. In doing so, they uncover a drug ring smuggling drugs from Mexico into Phoenix, Arizona and quickly discover just how vast and dangerous the smuggling operation really is.

== Cast ==
- Charlie Sheen as Detective Jake Peterson
- Martin Sheen as Detective Bill Peterson
- Mark Dacascos as Detective Paul DeLucca
- Joe Estevez as Pappy
- Bret Michaels as Detective Frank "Shane" Fields
- Tina Nguyen as Shi
- Paul Gleason as Detective John Bagwell
- Ron Masak as Julian Disanto
- Joe Lando as Willdog
- Courtney Gains as Cameron
- Meredith Salenger as Rebecca Peterson
- Bruce Nelson as Steve
- Emma Humphrey as Kaitlyn Peterson
