= In God's Hands (film) =

- Directed by: Zalman King
- Written by: Zalman King; Matt George
- Produced by: Tom Stern
- Starring: Patrick Shane Dorian; Matt George; Matty Liu; Shaun Tomson
- Cinematography: John B. Aronson
- Edited by: James Gavin Bedford; Joe Shugart
- Distributed by: TriStar Pictures
- Release date: April 24, 1998
- Running time: 96 minutes
- Country: United States
- Language: English
- Box office: $1,546,414

In God's Hands is a 1998 film by Zalman King, released through the production company created by actor Charlie Sheen and Bret Michaels, Sheen Michaels Entertainment. The basic story is of three young surfers on an action tour of the world's most exotic and dangerous surfing spots. They travel to Madagascar, Mexico, Bali and Hawaii seeking the ultimate wave, a 40-foot force of nature that travels at speeds up to 35 miles per hour.

== Cast ==
- Shane Dorian as Shane (as Patrick Shane Dorian)
- Matt George as Mickey
- Matty Liu as Keoni
- Shaun Tomson as Wyatt
- Maylin Pultar as Serena
- Bret Michaels as Phillips
- Brion James as Captain
- Brian L. Keaulana as Brian Deegan
- Darrick Doerner as Darrick
- Pete Cabrinha as Pete
- Rush Randle as Rush
- Mike Stewart as Stewart
- Brock Little as Brock
- Tom Stern as Shane's Father
- Amy Hathaway as Girl on Train
- Camerina Arvizu as Maria

== Soundtrack ==
The film's theme song "Sane" was written by Yoshiki and performed by Violet UK.

== Reception ==
On Rotten Tomatoes the film has a 0% rating based on reviews from 6 critics. In an article in Beach Grit, cast member and co-screenwriter Matt George described it as the "worst film ever made."
