= The Celebrity Apprentice =

American TV reality series

- Genre: Reality competition
- Created by: Mark Burnett
- Starring: Donald Trump; Ivanka Trump; Donald Trump Jr.; Eric Trump; Arnold Schwarzenegger
- Theme music composer: Kenneth Gamble; Leon Huff; Anthony Jackson
- Opening theme: "For the Love of Money"; Performed by The O'Jays
- Country of origin: United States
- Original language: English
- No. of seasons: 8
- No. of episodes: 90

Production
- Producers: Mark Burnett; Donald Trump; Arnold Schwarzenegger; (2017)
- Production locations: New York City, New York (2008–16); Los Angeles, California (2017)
- Running time: 60 minutes (season 1); 120 minutes (seasons 2–15)
- Production companies: Trump Productions (seasons 1–7); Mark Burnett Productions (seasons 1–6); United Artists Media Group (season 7); MGM Television (season 8)

Original release
- Network: NBC
- Release: January 3, 2008 – February 13, 2017

Related
- The Apprentice: Martha Stewart; The Apprentice

The Celebrity Apprentice is an American television reality competition series. It is a variation of The Apprentice series hosted by real estate developer Donald Trump from 2008 to 2015, and actor and former California Governor Arnold Schwarzenegger from January to August 2017, when it was canceled.

Like its precursor, the show's opening theme song is "For the Love of Money" by The O'Jays. Unlike its precursor, Celebrity Apprentice consists of celebrities as competing apprentices rather than unknowns. Some of the celebrities featured are contemporary while others have been out of the public eye for some time. They compete to win money for a charitable organization of their choice, and come from various mass media fields, including radio and television and professional sport.

The Celebrity Apprentice is linked in seasons to its precursor TV show, The Apprentice, which consists of seasons 1–6 and season 10. The Celebrity Apprentice consists of seasons 7–9 and 11–15.

== Format ==
The format of The Celebrity Apprentice follows that of the original The Apprentice, outside of housing arrangements; there is no communal living space, and celebrities are not required to live in the city during filming, allowing them to maintain their own appearance schedule, which may cause them to miss out on tasks at times. The two teams are given separate suites near the boardroom which they can use for planning and other activities related to the tasks.

Additionally, the celebrities as contestants are not vying for a job, but instead each selects a charity for which they are playing. The winner of each season gets a large donation made to that charity by the host, but in addition, winning project managers may also receive additional charity money by winning a task, either as a fixed amount set by the host and/or a participating business, or by the total charitable take they make on the task. The host also has discretion to provide charity funds to eliminated celebrities as a consolation prize.

== History ==
On July 6, 2007, it was announced that The Apprentice had been renewed for a seventh season, with a possibility of an eighth. In an effort to revitalize interest in the series, season seven featured celebrities playing the game to raise money for charities, going under the name The Celebrity Apprentice as opposed to continuing under The Apprentice format. British tabloid editor Piers Morgan was declared the winner of that season. On January 28, 2008, NBC confirmed that season eight would feature celebrities playing the game to raise money for charity. That season premiered in March 2009, and resulted in a win for comedian Joan Rivers.

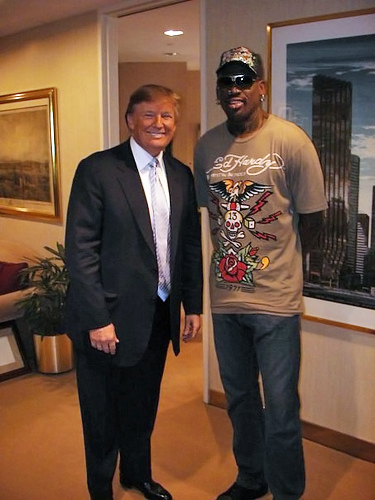
Trump with Dennis Rodman for Celebrity Apprentice in 2009

Season 3 of The Celebrity Apprentice aired in the spring of 2010, and was won by musician Bret Michaels.

On March 17, 2010, NBC officially stated that a new season of the original Apprentice would be brought back, with the explanation that regular working people would again attract audiences in light of the damaged U.S. economy. That season premiered September 16, 2010. This time the ratings were low, and both Trump and Producer Mark Burnett returned to the 'Celebrity' format, which saw John Rich win in season 4. In season 5, late night host Arsenio Hall won. In season 6, the first all-star season took place, bringing back 14 of the most memorable celebrities to compete for the first title of the All-Star Celebrity Apprentice, which country singer Trace Adkins won. In season 7, Donald Trump returned the show to the regular Celebrity Apprentice format; TV anchor and talk show host Leeza Gibbons won the season.

After Trump announced his intentions to run for President of the United States in the 2016 election in 2015, NBC began to re-evaluate their business relationship with Trump and whether he could still be host of The Apprentice series. NBC stated that they opted to sever their business ties with Trump following "derogatory statements by Donald Trump regarding immigrants" in June 2015, and began seeking a new host for the show. However, Trump stated that it was his decision to end the relationship with NBC "out of respect", even though he had been approached by Burnett and NBC to host two more seasons of the show just prior to his presidential bid. In an April 2016 interview, Trump revealed he earned about $213 million from the show over its 14 seasons.

In September 2015, NBC announced that actor and politician Arnold Schwarzenegger would become the new host of The Celebrity Apprentice to premiere during the 2016–17 television season. The rebooted series, The New Celebrity Apprentice first broadcast on January 2, 2017. Trump remained credited as an Executive Producer to the show, including what was estimated as a five-figure per-show fee as well as ongoing profits from the franchise through MGM, the production entity for the show.

On March 3, 2017, NBC announced that Arnold Schwarzenegger had stepped down as host of The Celebrity Apprentice. Schwarzenegger cited poor ratings as well as his feud with President Trump as factors in his decision.

== Statistics by season ==
Seasonal rankings (based on average total viewers per episode) of The Celebrity Apprentice on NBC. Note: Given that the show was a sequel television series, the below "statistics by season" chart is a continuation from its precursor's (The Apprentice) "statistics by season" chart. Note as well that season 10 is omitted from the chart below as the show reverted to The Apprentice for that season.

Season	Host	Winner	Winner's charity	Time slot	Season premiere	Season finale	TV season	Ranking	Viewers (in millions)	Finale viewers (in millions)
7	Donald Trump	Piers Morgan	Intrepid Fallen Heroes Fund	Thursday; 9:00 pm	January 3, 2008	March 27, 2008	2007–08	48	11.0	12.1
8	Donald Trump	Joan Rivers	God's Love We Deliver	Sunday; 9:00 pm	March 1, 2009	May 10, 2009	2008–09	52	9.0	8.7
9	Donald Trump	Bret Michaels	American Diabetes Association	Sunday; 9:00 pm	March 14, 2010	May 23, 2010	2009–10	59	7.4	9.3
11	Donald Trump	John Rich	St. Jude Children's Research Hospital	Sunday; 9:00 pm	March 6, 2011	May 22, 2011	2010–11	46	8.8	8.3
12	Donald Trump	Arsenio Hall	Magic Johnson Foundation	Sunday; 9:00 pm	February 19, 2012	May 20, 2012	2011–12	73	7.1	6.9
13	Donald Trump	Trace Adkins	American Red Cross	Sunday; 9:00 pm	March 3, 2013	May 19, 2013	2012–13	84	5.6	5.3
14	Donald Trump	Leeza Gibbons	Leeza's Care Connection	Monday; 8:00 pm	January 4, 2015	February 16, 2015	2014–15	67	7.6	6.1
15	Arnold Schwarzenegger	Matt Iseman	Arthritis Foundation	Monday; 8:00 pm	January 2, 2017	February 13, 2017	2016–17	90	4.8	3.5

== Candidates by season ==
Note: Winners are indicated in Bold; second-place finishers are indicated in Italics.

=== The Celebrity Apprentice 1 (season 7) ===
- Trace Adkins
- Carol Alt
- Stephen Baldwin
- Nadia Comăneci
- Tiffany Fallon
- Jennie Finch
- Nely Galán
- Marilu Henner
- Lennox Lewis
- **Piers Morgan**
- Tito Ortiz
- Omarosa
- Vincent Pastore
- Gene Simmons

=== The Celebrity Apprentice 2 (season 8) ===
- Clint Black
- Andrew Dice Clay
- Annie Duke
- Tom Green
- Natalie Gulbis
- Scott Hamilton
- Jesse James
- Claudia Jordan
- Khloé Kardashian
- Brian McKnight
- **Joan Rivers**
- Melissa Rivers
- Brande Roderick
- Dennis Rodman
- Herschel Walker
- Tionne "T-Boz" Watkins

=== The Celebrity Apprentice 3 (season 9) ===
- Rod Blagojevich
- Selita Ebanks
- Bill Goldberg
- Michael Johnson
- Maria Kanellis
- Cyndi Lauper
- Carol Leifer
- **Bret Michaels**
- Sharon Osbourne
- Holly Robinson Peete
- Summer Sanders
- Sinbad
- Curtis Stone
- Darryl Strawberry

=== The Celebrity Apprentice 4 (season 11) ===
- Gary Busey
- Jose Canseco
- David Cassidy
- Hope Dworaczyk
- Richard Hatch
- La Toya Jackson
- Star Jones
- NeNe Leakes
- Lil Jon
- Marlee Matlin
- Mark McGrath
- **John Rich**
- Lisa Rinna
- Niki Taylor
- Dionne Warwick
- Meat Loaf

=== The Celebrity Apprentice 5 (season 12) ===
- Clay Aiken
- Michael Andretti
- Adam Carolla
- Tia Carrere
- Lou Ferrigno
- Debbie Gibson
- Teresa Giudice
- Victoria Gotti
- **Arsenio Hall**
- Penn Jillette
- Lisa Lampanelli
- Dayana Mendoza
- Aubrey O'Day
- Dee Snider
- George Takei
- Paul Teutul Sr.
- Cheryl Tiegs
- Patricia Velásquez

=== The Celebrity Apprentice 6 (season 13) ===
- **Trace Adkins**
- Stephen Baldwin
- Gary Busey
- Marilu Henner
- La Toya Jackson
- Penn Jillette
- Claudia Jordan
- Lil Jon
- Bret Michaels
- Omarosa
- Lisa Rinna
- Brande Roderick
- Dennis Rodman
- Dee Snider

=== The Celebrity Apprentice 7 (season 14) ===
- Jamie Anderson
- Johnny Damon
- Vivica A. Fox
- **Leeza Gibbons**
- Brandi Glanville
- Kate Gosselin
- Gilbert Gottfried
- Sig Hansen
- Shawn Johnson
- Kevin Jonas
- Lorenzo Lamas
- Kenya Moore
- Terrell Owens
- Keshia Knight Pulliam
- Geraldo Rivera
- Ian Ziering

=== The New Celebrity Apprentice (season 15) ===
- Laila Ali
- Brooke Burke
- Eric Dickerson
- Boy George
- **Matt Iseman**
- Carrie Keagan
- Carson Kressley
- Lisa Leslie
- Jon Lovitz
- Vince Neil
- Nicole "Snooki" LaValle
- Kyle Richards
- Chael Sonnen
- Porsha Williams
- Ricky Williams
- Carnie Wilson

== Similar shows in other nations ==
- The Celebrity Apprentice Australia
- Celebrity Apprentice Ireland
- Comic Relief Does The Apprentice (British)
- Sport Relief Does The Apprentice (British)
- Kandidaten (Norwegian)
