= A Beautiful Soul (song) =

Single by Bret Michaels

from the album True Grit
- Released: April 1, 2014
- Recorded: March 2014
- Genre: Pop, pop rock, rock
- Length: 4:02
- Label: Poor Boy
- Songwriter: Bret Michaels

Bret Michaels singles chronology
"You Know You Want It" (2013)	"A Beautiful Soul" (2014)	"Girls On Bars" (2015)

"A Beautiful Soul" is a power ballad by Poison lead singer Bret Michaels, and was released as the lead single for the album True Grit. The song was released as a single on April 1, 2014 over one year before the release of the album, which was released May 5, 2015. The single features a music video which was released on April 2, 2014 and the song was performed live on the Bret Michaels edition of "Oprah's Lifeclass" which was taped live on Oprah's website This is one of the few Bret Michaels songs not to feature a guitar solo.

== Background ==
The song is a rock/country rock ballad backed mostly by piano. The story of the song revolves around lost love (a theme similar to those found on Poison songs like "Every Rose Has Its Thorn" and "I Won't Forget You"). The narrator says to the girl that he will miss her "beautiful soul."

== Music video ==
The music video for "A Beautiful Soul" features Bret Michaels walking thru various areas singing including one scene on a beach, another above a big city, and scenes in the desert at night, the video was released via his official YouTube page on April 2, 2014. His oldest daughter Raine makes a cameo appearance in the video. The video has generated over 1.2 million views in its first seven days.
