= Lie to Me (Bret Michaels song) =

Single by Bret Michaels

from the album Custom Built
- Released: April 20, 2010
- Recorded: 2010
- Genre: Hard rock
- Length: 3:06
- Label: Poor Boy
- Songwriter: Bret Michaels
- Producers: Bret Michaels; Pete Evick

Bret Michaels singles chronology
"Nothing to Lose" (2010)	"Lie to Me" (2010)	"Wasted Time" (2010)

Alternative cover
- Alternative explicit version

"Lie to Me" is a hard rock song performed by rock artist, Poison lead singer and reality television star Bret Michaels, released in April 2010. The song was released as the second single for his 2010 solo album Custom Built and features two versions, the clean radio version and an explicit version. The explicit version was a bonus track on the digital album and the radio version was released on the album. No video was made for the song.

== Background ==
The song is a hard rock song backed by a distorted guitar riff based on power chords and Bret's powerful vocals. Towards the end of the song after the solo, Bret comes in with a distorted vocal that he has utilized in previous songs. The story of the song revolves around lust (a theme similar to those found on Poison songs like "Talk Dirty to Me" and "I Want Action").

== Personnel ==
- Bret Michaels – lead vocals, rhythm guitar, background vocals
- Pete Evick – lead guitar, background vocals
- Chuck Fanslau – drums
- Ray Scheuring – bass
- Rob Jozwaick – keyboards

=== Additional personnel ===
- Heidi Wheeler – background vocals
