= A Letter from Death Row (film) =

- Film Poster
- Directed by: Marvin Baker; Bret Michaels
- Written by: Bret Michaels
- Starring: Bret Michaels; Martin Sheen
- Release date: November 17, 1998
- Running time: 90 minutes
- Country: United States
- Language: English

A Letter From Death Row is a 1998 psychological thriller film directed by Marvin Baker and Bret Michaels, lead singer of the hard rock band Poison. The film was released by Sheen Michaels Entertainment, a company created by Michaels and actor Charlie Sheen. The film was produced by Shane Stanley and stars Michaels, Martin Sheen, Charlie Sheen, and Kristi Gibson, Michaels' girlfriend.

The prison scenes were filmed on location in Tennessee State Prison, with real inmates as extras.

== Plot ==
Convicted killer Michael Raine is on death row. He is either guilty of killing his girlfriend or a victim of a conspiracy to frame him for a crime he didn't commit. As the story unfolds Jessica Foster, an assistant to the Governor of Tennessee begins to interview Raine while on death row, claiming that she's writing a book about the inmates. Through various circumstances, Raine puts two and two together and builds a case that he believes can prove his innocence. Ms. Foster is the only one on the 'outside" who can give Raine a voice, but is she working for those who framed him? As time draws near to the date of his execution, in his most desperate hour Raine finds the missing pieces to the puzzle to prove his innocence, but is it too late?

== Cast ==
- Bret Michaels as Michael Raine
- Martin Sheen as Michael's Father
- Kristi Gibson as Kristi Richards
- Phil Valentine as Donald Bateman
- Simon Elsworth as Officer Wendell
- Drew Boe as Lucifer T. Powers
- Bill Pankey as Redford
- Charlie Sheen as Cop

== Soundtrack ==
Bret Michaels also recorded and released the soundtrack to the film in the same year. Max T. Barnes worked as an engineer on the project.

== Documentary ==
A documentary was released in 2000 titled "High Tension, Low Budget (The Making of a Letter from Death Row)" and is included as a special extra bonus on DVD versions released outside the U.S. The extra includes the making of the film, featuring in depth interviews with cast and crew and various other clips of Bret Michaels in the 1990s leading up to the film's release.
