= Songs of Life (Bret Michaels album) =

Studio album by Bret Michaels
- Released: April 22, 2003
- Genre: Hard rock
- Length: 46:40
- Label: Poor Boy

Bret Michaels chronology
A Letter from Death Row (1998)	Songs of Life (2003)	Freedom of Sound (2005)

Singles from Songs of Life
- 1. "Raine" Released: 2003; 2. "Bittersweet" Released: 2003

Songs of Life is the debut solo studio album by American musician Bret Michaels, lead singer of the rock band Poison. The album was released April 22, 2003 and coincides with the same date of his two-year-old daughter Raine's birthday. The album is written and produced by Bret Michaels, Cliff Calabro and co-produced by Jeremy Rubolino. The music is inspired by events from Bret Michael's life.

== Content ==
The Poison style rock album features thirteen new tracks including the first single of the album "Raine", a song dedicated to his daughter Raine Elizabeth Sychak born on May 20, 2000. "Raine" also features Michaels' first solo music video which was directed by award-winning director Shane Stanley. The video was shot in ten locations over six months also containing some of Bret's actual family footage and is included on the enhanced CD release, as well as exclusive footage not shown in the TV version.

The album also features "Bittersweet" (the second single to be released), "One More Day" (a 9/11 tribute), and "Menace to Society" (which features a live Montage music video released on Bret Michaels website).

"Stay with Me", recorded earlier on the unique storytellers CD Ballads, Blues & Stories, was released for the first time on a full music studio album.

A music video was eventually made for the song "One More Day (9/11 Tribute)" on the 10 year anniversary of 9/11.

== Track listing ==
1. "Menace to Society" - 2:49
2. "Bittersweet" - 3:24
3. "Raine" - 3:55
4. "Forgiveness" - 4:19
5. "Loaded Gun" - 3:55
6. "Strange Sensation" - 2:55
7. "Songs of Life" - 3:12
8. "One More Day" (9-11 tribute) - 4:02
9. "I Remember" - 3:38
10. "The Chant" - 1:09
11. "It's My Party" - 3:54
12. "War Machine" - 3:21
13. "Party Rock Band" (Rock Edit) - 2:43
14. "Stay with Me" - 4:14
