= All I Ever Needed =

Single by Bret Michaels with Jessica Andrews

from the album Freedom of Sound
- Released: October 9, 2004
- Genre: Country
- Length: 3:48
- Label: Poor Boy
- Songwriter: Bret Michaels
- Producer: Bret Michaels

Bret Michaels singles chronology
"Right Now, Right Here" (2004)	"All I Ever Needed" (2004)	"Open Road" (2005)

Jessica Andrews singles chronology
"Good Time" (2003)	"A I Ever Needed" (2004)	"The Marrying Kind" (2005)

"All I Ever Needed" is the second single released from Bret Michaels third solo studio album, Freedom of Sound. The song is a duet with country music singer Jessica Andrews. It was released on October 9, 2004, where it debuted at No. 57 on the U.S. Billboard Hot Country Songs chart.

== Music video ==
The song features a music video, however, Andrews doesn't appear in it. The video appeared on the Billboard Hot Videoclip Tracks chart in 2008. The video was directed by Christie Cook. A second version of the video with Bret Michaels in Iraq footage was released in 2008 when the song featured on the compilation Rock My World.

== Chart performance ==
"All I Ever Needed" debuted at number 57 on the Hot Country Songs chart on October 9, 2004. The song spent 16 weeks on the chart, peaking at number 45 in its fourth week.

Chart (2004)	Peak position
US Hot Country Songs (Billboard)	45
