= Nothing to Lose (Bret Michaels song) =

Single by Bret Michaels featuring Miley Cyrus

from the album Custom Built
- Released: March 2, 2010
- Genre: Country; country rock
- Length: 3:54
- Label: Poor Boy
- Songwriter: Bret Michaels

Bret Michaels singles chronology
"Driven" (2008)	"Nothing to Lose" (2010)	"Lie to Me" (2010)

Miley Cyrus singles chronology
"When I Look at You" (2010)	"Nothing to Lose" (2010)	"Can't Be Tamed" (2010)

Licensed audio
- "Nothing to Lose (Feat. Miley Cyrus)" on YouTube

"Nothing to Lose" is a song written by Bret Michaels, and was recorded by Michaels as the lead single for his solo album, Custom Built. The song was originally recorded by Michaels himself; however, he was working with Miley Cyrus who asked to sing on the track with him. Miley Cyrus covered the hit Poison ballad "Every Rose Has Its Thorn" with Michaels for her album Can't Be Tamed and then became involved on Bret's new single.

== Background and composition ==
"Nothing to Lose" is a country rock ballad, backed mostly by acoustic guitar. The narrator describes a slow-churning declaration of codependence. "Nothing To Lose" features five recorded versions of the song: solo, solo acoustic, featuring Miley Cyrus, acoustic featuring Miley Cyrus and a country version also featuring the multi-platinum artist.

== Reception ==
Blake Boldt of Engine 145 gave the song a "thumbs down" review. He said that Michaels lures in listeners with a suggestive passage about getting sexy to save a faded love. Boldt also went on to say that the song metal-lite, mixed with tween country. He also felt that Miley Cyrus stole the show with her harmonies.

== Live performances ==
Bret Michaels performed 'Nothing to Lose' live with an acoustic guitar on "Lopez Tonight" and witnessing the audience's reaction to Michaels heartfelt performance, George Lopez closed with "That's how real rockers do it".

== Charts ==
Chart (2010)	Peak position
U.S. Billboard Top Rock Digital Songs	32
