= The Apprentice (American TV series) season 9 =

The Apprentice
- Season 9
- No. of contestants: 14
- Winner: Bret Michaels
- Runner-up: Holly Robinson Peete
- No. of episodes: 11

Release
- Original network: NBC
- Original release: March 14 – May 23, 2010

Additional information
- Filming dates: October 19 – November 12, 2009

Season chronology
- ← Previous; Season 8 Next → Season 10

The Celebrity Apprentice 3 (also known as The Apprentice 9) is the ninth installment of the reality game show The Celebrity Apprentice. On April 29, 2009, NBC officially announced the renewal of The Celebrity Apprentice for spring 2010. The show premiered on Sunday, March 14, 2010. The two-hour season finale was on Sunday, May 23, 2010, 9–11 p.m., ET/PT and the winner was Poison lead singer and Rock of Love star Bret Michaels. Michaels also returned for All-Star Celebrity Apprentice. Michaels was the only person from this season to return. Michaels was also the only previous winner to return and was fired first, coming in 14th.

== Candidates ==
The candidates for this season, as officially announced.

Celebrity	Profession	Original team	Age	Hometown	Charity	Result	Raised
Bret Michaels	Poison singer & Rock of Love star	Rocksolid	47	Mechanicsburg, Pennsylvania, U.S.	American Diabetes Association (Sponsor of Camps for Kids with Diabetes)	The Celebrity Apprentice (05–23–2010)	$640,000
Holly Robinson Peete	Actress	Tenacity	45	Germantown, Pennsylvania, U.S.	HollyRod Foundation	Fired in the season finale (05–23–2010)	$597,893
Sharon Osbourne	Music manager & reality television star	Tenacity	57	London, England	Cedars-Sinai: Sharon Osbourne Colon Cancer Program	Fired in week 10 (05–16–2010)	$50,000
Curtis Stone	Celebrity chef	Rocksolid	34	Melbourne, Australia	Feeding America	Fired in week 10 (05–16–2010)	$40,000
Maria Kanellis	Professional wrestler & model	Tenacity	28	Ottawa, Illinois, U.S.	Make-A-Wish Foundation	Fired in week 10 (05–16–2010)	$20,000
Cyndi Lauper	Singer & actress	Tenacity	56	New York City, New York, U.S.	Stonewall Community Foundation:True Colors Fund	Fired in week 9 (05–09–2010)	$45,000
Summer Sanders	Olympic swimmer	Tenacity	37	Roseville, California, U.S.	Right to Play	Fired in week 8 (05–02–2010)	$45,000
Bill Goldberg	WWE wrestler & actor	Rocksolid	43	Tulsa, Oklahoma, U.S.	Specchio Family Foundation: Sons of the Fallen	Fired in week 6 (04–18–2010)	
Selita Ebanks	Victoria's Secret model	Tenacity	27	George Town, Grand Cayman, Cayman Islands	Shine on Sierra Leone	Fired in week 5 (04–11–2010)	$20,000
Michael Johnson	Olympic sprinter	Rocksolid	42	Dallas, Texas, U.S.	Laureus Sport for Good Foundation	Quit in week 5 (04–11–2010)	
Rod Blagojevich	Former Governor of Illinois	Rocksolid	53	Chicago, Illinois, U.S.	Children's Cancer Center	Fired in week 4 (04–04–2010)	
Darryl Strawberry	Former MLB right fielder	Rocksolid	48	Los Angeles, California, U.S.	The Darryl Strawberry Foundation	Fired in week 3 (03–28–2010)	$25,000
Sinbad	Stand-up comedian & actor	Rocksolid	53	Benton Harbor, Michigan, U.S.	Omega Boys Club: Street Soldiers	Fired in week 2 (03–21–2010)	
Carol Leifer	Comedian & writer	Tenacity	53	East Williston, New York, U.S.	North Shore Animal League America	Fired in week 1 (03–14–2010)	$10,000

== Weekly results ==
Candidate	Original team	Week 7 team	Week 9 team	Final task team	Application result	Record as project manager
Bret Michaels	Rocksolid	Rocksolid	Tenacity	Rocksolid	The Celebrity Apprentice	2–0 (win in weeks 1 & 8)
Holly Robinson Peete	Tenacity	Tenacity	Tenacity	Tenacity	Fired in the Season Finale	1–2 (win in week 7, loss in weeks 5 & 9)
Sharon Osbourne	Tenacity	Rocksolid	Rocksolid		Fired in week 10	1–1 (win in week 9, loss in week 7)
Curtis Stone	Rocksolid	Tenacity	Rocksolid	Tenacity	Fired in week 10	1–0 (win in week 5)
Maria Kanellis	Tenacity	Rocksolid	Rocksolid	Tenacity	Fired in week 10	1–0 (win in week 2)
Cyndi Lauper	Tenacity	Tenacity	Tenacity		Fired in week 9	1–1 (win in week 6, loss in week 1)
Summer Sanders	Tenacity	Tenacity		Rocksolid	Fired in week 8	1–1 (win in week 3, loss in week 8)
Bill Goldberg	Rocksolid				Fired in week 6	0–1 (loss in week 6)
Selita Ebanks	Tenacity				Fired in week 5	1–0 (win in week 4)
Michael Johnson	Rocksolid				Quit in week 5	0–1 (loss in week 3)
Rod Blagojevich	Rocksolid				Fired in week 4	0–1 (loss in week 4)
Darryl Strawberry	Rocksolid			Rocksolid	Fired in week 3	
Sinbad	Rocksolid				Fired in week 2	0–1 (loss in week 2)
Carol Leifer	Tenacity				Fired in week 1	

No.	Elimination chart											
No.	Candidate	1	2	3	4	5	6	7	8	9	10	11
1	Bret	WIN	BR	IN	IN	IN	IN	IN	WIN	BR	IN	CA
2	Holly	IN	IN	IN	IN	LOSE	IN	WIN	IN	LOSE	IN	FIRED
3	Sharon	IN	IN	IN	IN	IN	IN	LOSE	IN	WIN	FIRED	
4	Curtis	IN	IN	IN	BR	WIN	IN	IN	BR	IN	FIRED	
5	Maria	IN	WIN	IN	IN	BR	IN	IN	IN	IN	FIRED	
6	Cyndi	LOSE	IN	IN	IN	IN	WIN	IN	BR	FIRED		
7	Summer	IN	IN	WIN	IN	IN	IN	IN	FIRED			
8	Bill	IN	IN	IN	IN	IN	FIRED					
9	Selita	IN	IN	IN	WIN	FIRED						
10	Michael	IN	IN	LOSE	BR	QUIT						
11	Rod	IN	BR	IN	FIRED							
12	Darryl	IN	IN	FIRED								
13	Sinbad	IN	FIRED									
14	Carol	FIRED										

^{1} No one was fired during this episode because both teams raised a lot of money.

The contestant was on the losing team.
The contestant won the competition and was named the Celebrity Apprentice.
The contestant won as project manager on his/her team.
The contestant lost as project manager on his/her team.
The contestant was on the losing team and brought to the final boardroom.
The contestant was fired.
The contestant lost as project manager and was fired.
The contestant was absent during the project due to a previous engagement.
The contestant quit the show.

== Episodes ==
=== Episode 1: True Colors ===
Task 1

- Airdate: March 14, 2010
- Actual date: October 2009
- Task scope: The teams had to run a New York diner called Burger Heaven. They'll be making their own menus. The team with the most money wins.
- Tenacity project manager: Cyndi Lauper
- Rocksolid project manager: Bret Michaels
- Judges: Donald Trump; Ivanka Trump; Donald Trump Jr.
- Winning team: Rocksolid
  - Reasons for win: Although they didn't get $10,000 from Joan Rivers, they earned a total profit of $57,905. Bret Michaels had Curtis Stone create a range of expensive truffle-based dishes to ensure that even the members of the general public would be giving large donations, and Curtis and Bill Goldberg made a very efficient kitchen team, despite Rod Blagojevich being a very slow server.
- Losing team: Tenacity
  - Reasons for loss: Even though Selita Ebanks's cooking was well-received and they got $10,000 from Joan Rivers, they only earned $39,559 overall. Ivanka said that Tenacity's price points were too low from tracking customers on the streets, and that the team was disorganized and failed to ensure that their big donors were served over the general public.
  - Sent to boardroom: No final boardroom – Cyndi said that no member of the team had performed exceptionally well or poorly, which Ivanka concurred with. Based on the feedback from the other women and the amount of money raised, Trump ultimately narrowed it down to Carol Leifer and Selita Ebanks; while he initially appeared inclined to fire Selita, who brought in no donors whatsoever, Ivanka pointed out that without her cooking skills the women would never have gotten the money from Joan Rivers, and would have taken an even heavier beating. This saved Selita and led to Carol being fired.
- Fired: Carol Leifer – for raising very little money and not contributing much overall to the task. Carol's name came up the most when Trump asked the teammates who should be fired, and she was also felt to have been partially at fault for the poor crowd control in their diner.
- Notes:
  - At the start of the task, the two teams were each asked to choose the opposing team's project manager. The men chose Cyndi Lauper, hoping that she would mess up and get eliminated early on, as she was the only native New Yorker on either team, which they felt gave the women a big advantage. The women were split between Bret Michaels (who had admitted being severely jetlagged) and Rod Blagojevich (who they felt would focus on making himself look good at the expense of actually running the task), and eventually decided on Bret, hoping to set him up for failure.
  - Joan Rivers said the burger she got from Rocksolid's restaurant was cold and that she wanted to eliminate Rod Blagojevich for acting like a politician to the other customers.
  - After Carol Leifer was eliminated, she asked Trump if he could donate some money to her charity, The North Shore Animal League. Trump agreed, and then donated $10,000 out of his pocket for Carol's charity.
  - This is the only season premiere that didn't have a final boardroom.

=== Episode 2: Smooth In, Smooth Out ===
Task 2

- Airdate: March 21, 2010
- Task scope: Run a Kodak Storefront
- Task sponsor: Kodak
- Tenacity project manager: Maria Kanellis
- Rocksolid project manager: Sinbad
- Judges: Donald Trump; Ivanka Trump; Donald Trump Jr.
- Winning team: Tenacity
  - Reasons for win: They seemed to promote the product more than the men which is what the Kodak presidents were looking for despite four power outages that threatened them during the walkthrough
- Losing team: Rocksolid
  - Reasons for loss: While the men were praised for using their celebrity power (such as Darryl posing in a New York Mets jersey), with certain people the men fell short on getting the product out to the customers and also lost because of a card that had a website to find the pictures that were taken at the store: the website was nowhere to be found on the card, according to 2 secret shoppers that shopped at the men's storefront
  - Sent to boardroom: Sinbad, Bret Michaels, Rod Blagojevich
- Fired: Sinbad – for not leading well as the team leader and for not being able to manage Bret, who disappeared for the first part of the task. Sinbad was criticized for the website card as well and also was fired for bringing Rod Blagojevich in when he was not responsible for the loss.
- Kodak Moment – America's Choice: Rod Mistaken For Donny Osmond
- Kodak Moment – Trump's Choice: Rod Mistaken For Donny Osmond

=== Episode 3: Yellow Blur ===
- Airdate: March 28, 2010
- Task scope: The teams were asked to create an advertorial for Norton 360 + Lifelock.
- Task sponsor: Norton 360 and LifeLock
- Tenacity project manager: Summer Sanders
- Rocksolid project manager: Michael Johnson
- Judges: Donald Trump; Donald Trump Jr.; Gavin Maloof
- Winning team: Tenacity
  - Reasons for win: Although they floundered the team's presentation, the women had a better use of graphics and a more attention-grabbing, emotional connectivity in their ad content.
- Losing team: Rocksolid
  - Reasons for loss: Despite having a good presentation, the men's advertorial was too verbose to be effective. Trump also felt that using Curtis Stone as the front-man for their campaign was a strange decision, and that Bill Goldberg's wrestling background would have made him a better fit.
  - Sent to boardroom: No final boardroom – when Trump asked the men who should be fired they were divided between Michael Johnson, who they felt was the most directly at fault for the loss, and Rod Blagojevich, who they felt was the team's weakest member overall. However, the discussion was rendered irrelevant when Darryl Strawberry suddenly announced that he didn't really want to continue on the show, and was willing to be fired.
- Fired: Darryl Strawberry – He functionally quit by asking to be fired, adding that he felt unable to keep up with the pace of the competition. Trump strongly hinted that Michael Johnson would have been fired had it not been for Darryl asking to leave.
- Kodak Moment – America's Choice: Rod's Computer Incompetence
- Kodak Moment – Trump's Choice: Michael's Photo Shoot
- Notes:
  - Not only did Summer win $20,000 for her charity but Life Lock and Norton would donate $10 for every sale. At the finale, she revealed she got an additional $25,000 from the sales.
  - Rocksolid were slowed down in the planning stages when Rod Blagojevich, who was supposed to be in charge of research, proved completely unable to use the supplied computers and had to be reassigned to a different task, which he also proved rather slow at. Michael Johnson felt that Rod had been the team's weakest contributor, but said in the boardroom that he wasn't really at fault for the loss.
  - The episode was dedicated to D'Marco Ray, a sound supervisor who had died.

=== Episode 4: Focus on that Image ===
- Airdate: April 4, 2010
- Task scope: To create a 3D experience for the Wizarding World of Harry Potter
- Task sponsor: Universal Studios Florida
- Tenacity project manager: Selita Ebanks
- Rocksolid project manager: Rod Blagojevich
- Judges: Donald Trump; George H. Ross; Erin Burnett
- Winning team: Tenacity
  - Reasons for win: The team was more focused on the theme park image, and the children who went to both experiences unanimously preferred Tenacity's experience. Credit was given in particular to Cyndi Lauper, for her enthusiastic performance in their presentation.
- Losing team: Rocksolid
  - Reasons for loss: Although they also focused on the demographic of the overall theme park of the new attraction and brand messaging, there were some inconsistencies in the display, which made overly heavy use of smoke-effects and confused much of the Harry Potter terminology (such as mispronouncing the castle as "Hogwards" instead of Hogwarts and using the term "classes" instead of houses). The executives and children also felt that Bill Goldberg had been extremely unconvincing in his two roles in the presentation.
  - Sent to boardroom: Rod Blagojevich, Curtis Stone, Michael Johnson
  - Trump Thoughts: Trump was baffled by Rod Blagojevich's boardroom choices, noting that there were valid reasons to bring back both Bret Michaels (for making the creative decisions the executives didn't like and later admitting he should be brought back over Curtis and Michael) and Bill Goldberg (who did poorly in the presentation) rather than Curtis or Michael, who weren't to blame for the loss. Rod tried to defend his choice by pointing out that Bret and Bill had worked the hardest on the task, and while Trump considered this loyalty commendable, it left him with no option but to fire Rod.
- Fired: Rod Blagojevich – for having poor quality leadership and not delegating the team correctly, and for not bringing back Bret Michaels, who made most of the key decisions when Rod was separated from the team early in the task or Bill Goldberg, whose performance in Rocksolid's presentation was poor.
- Kodak Moment – America's Choice: Rod's Sleepy Journey
- Kodak Moment – Trump's Choice: Cyndi's Wacky Wizard
- Notes:
  - Selita Ebanks had won $20,000 to her charity.
  - Sharon Osbourne was still ill from Tenacity at the prop house.
  - Selita Ebanks and Rod Blagojevich were both flown to the Universal Studios Florida resort to carry out research, and had to delegate jobs to their teams remotely during the first half of the task. While Selita did this well, Rod struggled due to his lack of technical knowledge. Moreover, Selita worked and focused on the task during the flight to and from Florida, while Rod slept through both legs of the journey.
  - Bret Michaels states during the task that he likes Erin Burnett.

=== Episode 5: He Shoots, He Scores ===
- Airdate: April 11, 2010
- Task scope: The teams are asked to develop a 10-second and 30-second commercial for Right Guard. Each team will have an ex-NBA star.
- Results: Rocksolid selects Clyde Drexler and Tenacity selects Scottie Pippen.
- Task sponsor: Right Guard
- Tenacity project manager: Holly Robinson Peete
- Rocksolid project manager: Curtis Stone
- Judges: Donald Trump; George H. Ross; Ivanka Trump
- Winning team: Rocksolid
  - Reasons for win: Trump & The Right Guard Executives said that their 10-second commercial was perfect, and the 30 second commercial was funny.
- Losing team: Tenacity
  - Reasons for loss: Although they had the best 30 second commercial, especially the jingle which was perfect for Cyndi's voice, the commercial's focus didn't target the right demographic. Ivanka pointed out they didn't produce the two required separate ads.
- Quit: Michael Johnson – he had unknown issues of which to take care. He did not disclose the issues, but admitted he hated to quit.
  - Initial boardroom: During the task, Holly went to the edit room that she heard something wrong in the audio. It played five times and she said, "What is that?". Holly brought up a point that Maria did not hear it. Then in the boardroom, Holly does not think that Maria is a loyal team player; which Ivanka brought that statement up.
  - Sent to boardroom: Holly Robinson Peete, Maria Kanellis, Selita Ebanks
- Fired: Selita Ebanks – for not being as aggressive or passionate as the other contestants, and for being unanimously named as the weakest member of her team (despite winning as project manager the previous week) by the other women.
- Kodak Moment – America's Choice: Donald Shoots and Scores
- Kodak Moment – Trump's Choice: Donald Shoots and Scores
- Notes:
  - Right Guard gave Curtis & Feeding America a matching check of $20,000 for winning the challenge.
  - In the beginning, Trump made the celebrities shoot a basketball into the hoop. The person that made it would get $10,000. Maria from Tenacity got it, so she won $10,000 for Holly.
  - Holly was awarded $10,000 for her charity for the basketball hoop challenge.
  - Curtis Stone became the only man aside from eventual winner Bret Michaels to win as project manager this season, and the only man aside from Bret and Darryl Strawberry to raise any money for his charity.
  - Holly wanted to bring Cyndi back to the boardroom because she had missed the first day, but Trump didn't recommend it, saying that he wouldn't fire Cyndi if Holly brought her back.

=== Episode 6: Beauty and Brains ===
- Airdate: April 18, 2010
- Task scope: To make over an aspiring country musician.
- Results: Tenacity selected Emily West and Rocksolid selected Luke Bryan.
- Tenacity project manager: Cyndi Lauper
- Rocksolid project manager: Bill Goldberg
- Judges: Donald Trump; Trace Adkins; Donald Trump Jr.
- Dramatic Tension: The men struggled to get Luke Bryan to accept their ideas for a makeover, as he already had a specific image of himself and was extremely reluctant to alter it in any way. Cyndi Lauper annoyed the other women on her team, particularly Maria Kanellis, by constantly rejecting their ideas and going with her own, with Sharon Osbourne (who returned to the show halfway through the task) being the only other person she listened to. In the boardroom, Maria backed off on her criticisms of Cyndi, who she admitted was an expert in the industry and that she clearly knew what she was doing. Cyndi, on the other hand, furiously attacked Maria, accusing her of being the only person on the team who failed to deliver and saying that Maria should be fired if they lost.
- Winning team: Tenacity
  - Reasons for win: Emily West gave a more inspiring and emotionally moving performance, and gave a far better magazine interview than Luke. The only major flaw noted was that the promotional material produced by the team looked somewhat unprofessional, largely due to Cyndi Lauper's insistence on not airbrushing or otherwise touching up the photographs.
- Losing team: Rocksolid
  - Reasons for loss: Despite having better promotional materials, and a lively concert performance, the industry experts and even Luke Bryan himself unanimously disliked the "tough guy" image the team came up with, and felt that Bill Goldberg and Bret Michaels had simply applied their own personal tastes to Luke. They also felt that Luke came across as rambling, inarticulate and lifeless in an interview given to People Magazine.
  - Sent to boardroom: No final boardroom – despite Bret Michaels actually admitting that he should be fired, Trump deemed Bill Goldberg to be clearly at fault for the loss, and that given this along with him not adequately defending himself against Donald Trump Jr.'s accusation that he had been content to stay in the background on the previous tasks, he was the obvious choice to leave.
- Fired: Bill Goldberg – for stepping up as project manager during a task that was better suited for Bret Michaels, admitting that Bret had done 95% of the work on the task and then later trying to deny having made this claim, and for being seen as a generally much weaker contributor to the prior tasks than Bret or Curtis Stone.
- Kodak Moment – America's Choice: Emily Idolizes Cyndi
- Kodak Moment – Trump's choice: Bret and Trace Bond
- Notes:
  - Despite the women all naming Selita Ebanks as their weakest link, Cyndi Lauper and Summer Sanders were disappointed to see that she had actually been fired, with both agreeing that they would have rather seen Holly Robinson Peete (who they saw as their strongest competitor) or Maria Kanellis (who they both had personal problems with) be fired instead.
  - After getting $20,000 from Mr. Trump, Emily West and Luke Bryan will donate all proceeds at the next month of sales from iTunes with their new singles "Blue Sky" and "Rain is a Good Thing" to Cyndi's charity. At the finale, Cyndi had earned an additional of $25,000 from the sales.
  - Bret Michaels was visibly despondent after Bill Goldberg's firing, and even snapped at Trump as he left the boardroom. Guest judge Trace Adkins was initially unsure about whether or not to agree with the decision, but ultimately admitted that Bill had been such an ineffectual leader that the music industry experts actually thought Bret was the project manager.
  - Cyndi Lauper mentioned this episode on the finale of America's Got Talent when she performed her own song "True Colors" with Emily West. As she did not know if The Apprentice and America's Got Talent were on the same network, Lauper did not initially mention this show by name, but after being assured by Emily that it was, she said it was "The Apprentice".
  - This is the first time a previous candidate who did not win the season was brought back as a boardroom judge. Though Trace would ultimately win in a later season.

=== Episode 7: Rock n Roll All Night ===
- Airdate: April 25, 2010
- Task scope: To create a celebrity workout class for 24 Hour Fitness. The team that raised the most money would win both teams' money.
- Task sponsor: 24 Hour Fitness
- Corporate reshuffle: With the men having been virtually wiped out by losing four out of the previous five tasks, and also due to Michael Johnson resigning from the show leaving two men left (Curtis and Bret), Trump started to reshuffle the teams by Sharon and Maria moving to Rocksolid & Curtis to Tenacity.
  - New Rocksolid Team: Bret Michaels, Sharon Osbourne, and Maria Kanellis
  - New Tenacity Team: Curtis Stone, Holly Robinson Peete, Cyndi Lauper, and Summer Sanders
- Judges: Donald Trump; Ivanka Trump; Donald Trump Jr.
- Tenacity project manager: Holly Robinson Peete
- Rocksolid project manager: Sharon Osbourne
- Winning team: Tenacity
  - Reasons for win: The team raised $206,090.
- Losing team: Rocksolid
  - Reasons for loss: Though they won the $24,000 bonus, they only raised $131,803.
- Sent to boardroom: No final boardroom
- Fired: No one – since everyone did an outstanding job in their fundraising efforts, Trump decided to keep the teams intact for another task.
- Kodak Moment – America's Choice: Barron Trump Tees Off
- Kodak Moment – Trump's Choice: Barron Trump Tees Off
- Notes:
  - At the end of the episode, NBC wished a speedy recovery to Bret Michaels, who was hospitalized just before this episode aired.
  - Although Tenacity ultimately raised more money, Rocksolid won the $24,000 for having a better celebrity workout video, which was themed around a rock concert.
  - The total raised was $347,893, a Celebrity Apprentice record for an episode other than the finale.
  - For the second time in Apprentice history, nobody was fired.
  - While practicing her team's workout routine, Summer Sanders did some squats. While squatting, her shirt rode up and her jeans drooped down, exposing her lower back tattoo, her underwear, and her butt crack.
  - Holly cut a portion of the raised money for Sharon's charity.

=== Episode 8: Rebuilding the Tension ===
- Airdate: May 2, 2010
- Task scope: To create three radio commercials for three different areas (plumbing, heating/air-conditioning, and electricity maintenance) of a home repair company named Clockwork Home Services.
- Tenacity project manager: Summer Sanders
- Rocksolid project manager: Bret Michaels
- Dramatic decision: All seven celebrities escaped from the boardroom after the 24 Hour Fitness task. Trump promised one of them will be fired; In fact, he hinted that it might be two people.
- Judges: Donald Trump; Ivanka Trump; Eric Trump
- Winning team: Rocksolid
  - Reasons for win: The executives of the company believed that their commercials were superior to Tenacity's in terms of clarity and originality, despite having made reference to a plumber's crack in one of the ads, which the executives found distasteful.
- Losing team: Tenacity
  - Reasons for loss: Despite enjoying Cyndi Lauper's singing, the executives believed the team's commercials were too wordy, and they wanted to hear more of Cyndi's voice.
  - Sent to boardroom: Cyndi Lauper, Summer Sanders, Curtis Stone. Cyndi was sent out of the boardroom before Trump fired Summer.
- Fired: Summer Sanders – for taking responsibility as project manager and for not defending herself.
- Kodak Moment – America's Choice: Holly's Surprise Visit
- Kodak Moment – Trump's Choice: Holly's Surprise Visit
- Notes:
  - At the end of the episode, NBC wished another speedy recovery to Bret Michaels, who was recently hospitalized.
  - During the task, Maria stole a piece of pizza from Tenacity, which angered Curtis. Later in the boardroom, when Trump asked Sharon and Maria who they thought should be fired from Tenacity, they both said Curtis, with Sharon believing he was too smug.
  - This is the first time that Eric Trump has joined in as Mr. Trump's "eyes and ears".
  - The executives decided to double the money making it into $40,000.
  - Bret Michaels received $40,000 for his charity; he had now raised $140,000.

=== Episode 9: Apartment Journey ===
- Airdate: May 9, 2010
- Corporate reshuffle: At the last boardroom, Curtis made a reason how Maria & Sharon dislike him since they haven't worked together yet, and now they're working together. So Trump moved Bret to Tenacity and Curtis to (his old original team) Rocksolid.
- Taskscope: Teams are asked to rebuild and remodel an apartment.
- Tenacity project manager: Holly Robinson Peete
- Rocksolid project manager: Sharon Osbourne
- Judges: Donald Trump; Donald Trump Jr.; Richard LeFrak
- Winning team: Rocksolid
  - Reasons for win: The judges felt "solidly" about their decoration, and also thought that they had managed to make the apartment feel bigger. While they criticized the lack of "wow" factor in the celebrity room, they thought that Rocksolid was far superior.
- Losing team: Tenacity
  - Reasons for loss: Although they loved Cyndi's idea for the celebrity room and liked the pictures Bret took of New York, the team made the apartment look cheaper than Zen, there were a lot of things going on inside the apartment, and frankly the executives really disliked the master bedroom that has the color "seafoam green".
  - Initial boardroom: Trump is initially critical to Bret because he felt that Bret is not being decisive about firing Holly or Cyndi.
- Sent to boardroom: Mr. Trump requested Holly Robinson Peete, Cyndi Lauper, and Bret Michaels to wait in the reception area.
  - Internal Review turning point: Mr. LeFrak considered firing Bret because he felt that Bret is not giving an answer to eliminate one person and Bret was off to a prior concert engagement, albeit for only one night. Don Jr. noted he would've suggested Holly, until Cyndi told Mr. Trump that it was actually Holly's idea to paint the celebrity room red. Because of this, Don Jr. felt that Cyndi made a huge "tactical mistake."
- Fired: Cyndi Lauper – for telling Mr. Trump that the color of the celebrity room, which was the judges' favorite room and for which Cyndi was given much credit, was actually Holly's idea. Cyndi was also criticized for bossing around the men who had come to work on the apartment.
- Kodak Moment – America's Choice: Bret's Stair Climb
- Kodak Moment – Trump's Choice: Sharon's Prop House Espionage
- Notes:
  - Richard LeFrak decided to double the money that Sharon won making her total $40,000.
  - Rocksolid had won 5 out of 6 factors: Bathroom, apartment size, master bedroom, kitchen, and living room. The judges felt like the celebrity room turned into a media room. And it had no "wow" factor.
  - Tenacity had 4 out of 6 factors: Bathroom, kitchen, living room, and especially Cyndi's favorite red celebrity room. The apartment was smaller and the seafoam green room was awful.
  - Sharon Osbourne had won $40,000 to her charity. This also meant that every female competitor from this season had earned some money for their charity.

=== Episode 10: The Weak Link ===
- Airdate: May 16, 2010
- Taskscope: Interviews with Bill Rancic & Joan Rivers
- Judges: Donald Trump; Joan Rivers; Bill Rancic
- Fired:
  - Maria Kanellis – for making an uncouth remark about Curtis Stone prior to the interviews. Kanellis explained her reason for calling Curtis arrogant the previous week, saying that it was because he "took a crap" in the Rocksolid bathroom and let the stench waft over the team room. She would almost certainly have been fired at this point anyway since the other candidates near-unanimously deemed her the weakest candidate from the final five, but her insulting remarks ensured her dismissal.
  - Curtis Stone – for being the weakest out of the four remaining candidates. According to Joan and Bill, Curtis was weaker than the other contestants, with Rancic even calling him "a one-trick pony". Holly, Bret, and Sharon all agreed, although they also complimented him being a gentleman and a fantastic contestant.
  - Sharon Osbourne – for not having what it took at the time to become the Celebrity Apprentice. Bill thought Sharon was not as strong as Holly or Bret, but Joan disagreed, feeling that Sharon and Holly should advance to finals. In the end, Trump heeded Bill's advice and fired Sharon, as he thought she may not be strong enough to deal with the huge task that was to come. He also had concerns that Sharon was too much in awe of Holly, due to Sharon's lengthy praises of her prior to the interviews and felt that Sharon was effectively acknowledging Holly as being a better candidate.
- Kodak Moment – America's Choice: Curtis Manipulates Bret
- Kodak Moment – Trump's Choice: Curtis Manipulates Bret
- Notes:
  - In this episode, three people were fired, revealing the final two. After the previous episode's boardroom, Trump summoned the remaining five celebrities, and told them that only four of them would get to take part in the interviews, while the weakest candidate from the final five would be dismissed immediately. Upon questioning, the celebrities (apart from Bret Michaels, whom Trump did not get around to questioning before the firing occurred) all agreed that Holly Robinson Peete was the strongest of the remaining candidates and that Maria Kanellis was the weakest.
  - After being criticized by Curtis Stone, Maria accused Curtis of being arrogant by "taking a crap in our dressing room and leaving the stench in the room" during the previous task. Trump felt that statement was offensive to Curtis's character and "hitting below the belt". Curtis also told Trump that this was a "good depiction" of Maria's character. Following her dismissal she still refused to admit any wrongdoing, and called Trump's decision "laughable".
  - Interviews were conducted by The Apprentice season one winner, Bill Rancic, and The Celebrity Apprentice season eight winner, Joan Rivers.
  - Coincidentally, all three of the people who were fired (Sharon, Curtis, and Maria), are all the last remaining members of Rocksolid, while Bret and Holly, the final two, were both on Tenacity.
  - This episode will be continued into the finale episode, where the winner will be announced.
  - Maria's elimination marked the first time a candidate was fired before a task even began.

=== Episode 11 (Finale): You're Hired, You're Fired ===
- Task scope: The teams were asked to develop a new flavor from Snapple. Then, the marketing materials they were asked is a 30-second commercial and a brochure.
- Bret's Team: Summer Sanders and Darryl Strawberry
- Holly's Team: Curtis Stone and Maria Kanellis
- Runner Up: Holly Robinson Peete – for having a slightly less effective overall campaign than Bret Michaels
- Named the Celebrity Apprentice/Winner: Bret Michaels
- Kodak Moment Of The Season – America's Choice: Rod Mistaken For Donny Osmond
- Kodak Moment Of The Season – Trump's Choice: Rod Mistaken For Donny Osmond
- Notes:
  - The finale was televised live from New York University.
  - Cyndi Lauper and Summer Sanders announced the extra money they have made from their respective tasks.
  - Cyndi performed a live song from her upcoming Memphis Blues album, in which she danced on the Boardroom table.
  - Donald Trump gave $25,000 to Darryl Strawberry's charity for coming back to the show.
  - Neither Sharon Osbourne nor Bill Goldberg returned to participate in the finale. Bill Goldberg could not return because his son Gage was sick. Sharon Osbourne could not return because of a "pre-existing charity commitment."
  - Both Bret Michaels and Holly Robinson Peete received $250,000 from Snapple.
  - Donald Trump never actually said "You're fired" to Holly Robinson Peete; rather, he simply turned to Bret Michaels and announced "You're hired!".
  - In the season finale, Joan Rivers clashed with Bill Rancic.
  - In an unaired scene from the television episode, Mr. Trump gave Sharon another donation of $10,000 to her charity because he felt she deserved to win more money.
  - Bret Michaels is the first winner since Bill Rancic to have a losing team record. Bret also has the worst team record out of all the winners with 3 wins and 6 losses.

== Trivia ==
- On April 18, 2017, Sharon Osbourne revealed on The Talk her dissatisfaction with her participation on the series. She expressed her dislike for the producers demands for drama and the unknown charities she asked her friends to donate to. However, she did note regardless that she had a positive experience with Donald Trump and his wife.

== US ratings ==
Episode	Rating	Share	Rating/share (18–49)	Viewers (millions)	Rank (Timeslot)	Rank (Night)
1					3	3
2	4.2	7	2.6/7	6.86	3	4
3	4.6	7	2.8/7	7.35	3	5
4	4.2	8	2.8/8	7.37	3	4
5	4.7	8	3.5/8	7.9	3	5
6	4.6	8	2.9/8	7.20	3	7
7	4.5	6	2.8/6	6.60	3	6
8	4.4	7	3.3/7	7.30	3	5
9	4.5	8	2.7/8	7.20	3	7
10	4.7	8	3.1/8	7.70	3	4
11	4.0	6	3.4/9	9.30	2	6
