= Freedom of Sound =

Studio album by Bret Michaels
- Released: January 1, 2005
- Recorded: 1997–2004
- Genre: Country rock
- Length: 66:10
- Label: Poor Boy
- Producers: Bret Michaels, Jamie Laritz

Bret Michaels chronology
Songs of Life (2003)	Freedom of Sound (2005)	Rock My World (2008)

Singles from Freedom of Sound
- 1. ""All I Ever Needed" (with Jessica Andrews)" Released: 2004; 2. "Right Now, Right Here" Released: 2004; 3. "Open Road" Released: April 19, 2005

Freedom of Sound is the second solo studio album by Bret Michaels, lead singer of the rock band Poison. It is a country rock album released in 2005, the same year Bret Michaels was a judge on the country music reality TV show Nashville Star.

== Content ==
The album features fourteen new tracks and four previously released songs (bonus tracks) from his first two studio albums.

The lead-off single from the album, "All I Ever Needed" featuring Jessica Andrews appeared on Billboard's "Hot Country Songs" chart, with its best position being number 45. All I Ever Needed also features a music video which appeared on Billboard's "Hot Videoclip Tracks" chart in 2008.

"Right Now, Right Here" and "Open Road" which Bret performed live on Nashville Star were also released as singles.

The album also includes a new country version of the #1 smash hit Poison song "Every Rose Has Its Thorn", a duet version of "Raine" (feat. Edwin Mccain) and two unreleased demos; "Future Ex Wife" and "The One You Get".

"Walk Away" and a solo version of the Poison song "Something to Believe In" were recorded earlier on the unique storytellers CD Ballads, Blues & Stories, but never released on a full music studio album until now.

== Track listing ==
1. "Rock 'n My Country"
2. "Driven"
3. "Open Road"
4. "All I Ever Needed" (feat. Jessica Andrews)
5. "New Breed of American Cowboy"
6. "Right Now, Right Here"
7. "Lookin' for a Good Time"
8. "It's All Good"
9. "Every Rose Has Its Thorn" (country version featuring Brad Arnold of 3 Doors Down, Chris Cagle, Mark Wills)
10. "Bittersweet" (Originally on Songs of Life)
11. "Raine" (feat. Edwin Mccain)
12. "Menace to Society" (Originally on Songs of Life)
13. "Walk Away"
14. "Something to Believe In" (solo version)
15. "Future Ex Wife"
16. "The One You Get"
17. "Human Zoo" (Originally on A Letter from Death Row)
18. "The Last Breath" (Originally on A Letter from Death Row)

== Personnel ==
- Bret Michaels - lead vocals, guitar, harmonica
- Jamie Laritz - guitar, bass, drums mandolin/dobro
- Eric Brittingham - bass
- Shawn Hughes - drums, percussion

=== Additional musicians ===
- Rusty Danmyer - steel guitar
- Renee Truex - violin
- Jessica Andrews - additional vocals (4)
- Mark Wills - additional vocals (5 & 9)
- Chris Cagle - additional vocals (9)
- Brad Arnold - additional vocals (9)
- Captain Clay Ckarkson - additional vocals (5 & 7)
- Dan Donovan - additional vocals (5 & 7)
- Jeffrey Steele - background vocals
- Kim Everett - background vocals
- Darien Keith Thompson - background vocals

== Charts ==
Singles

Single	Chart (2004)	Peak position
"All I Ever Needed"	US Hot Country Songs (Billboard)	45
