= Peter Keys =

American keyboardist (born 1965)

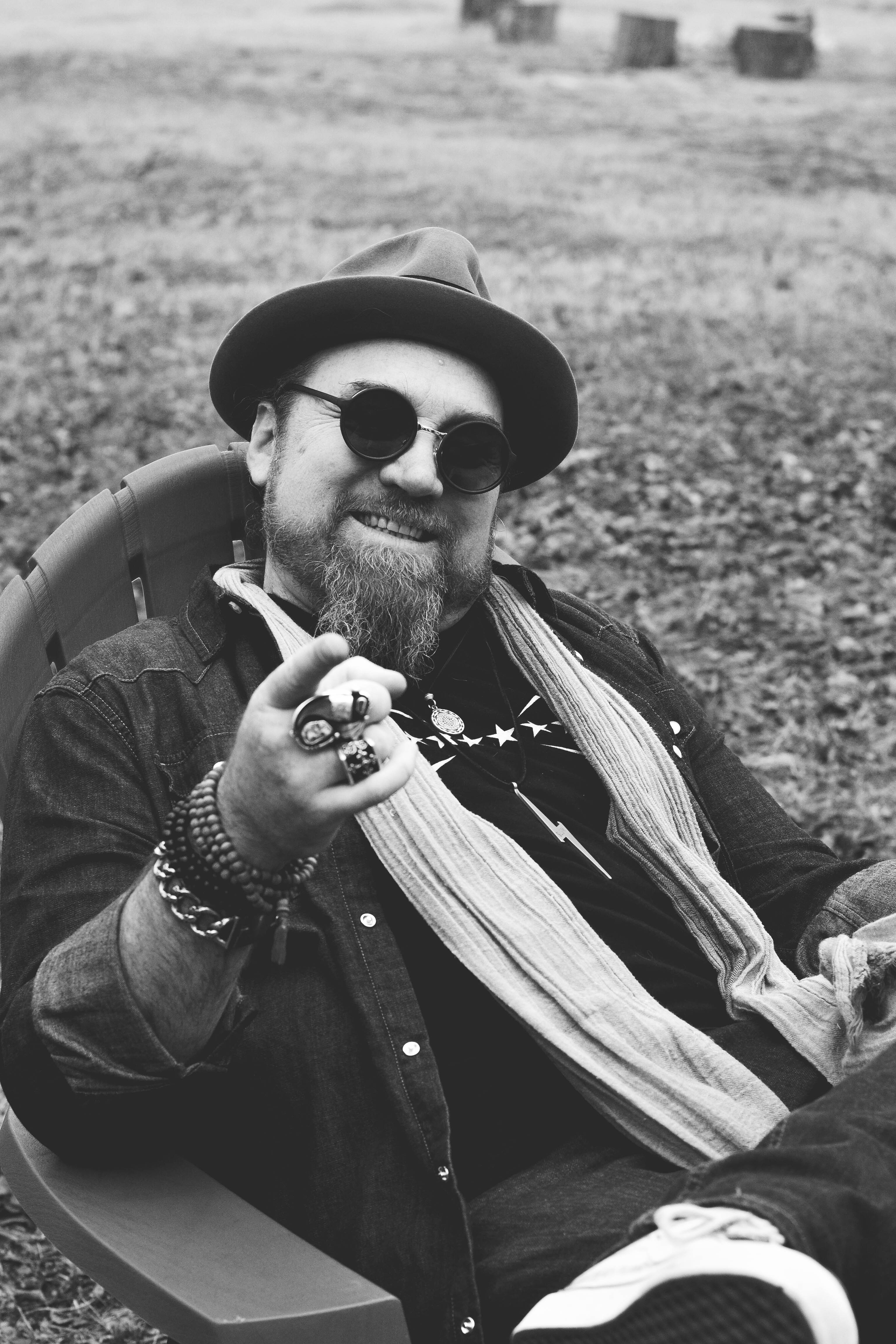
- Keys in 2017

Background information
- Born: May 30, 1965 (age 61); Burlington, Vermont, U.S.
- Genres: Classical, funk, southern rock
- Instrument: Keyboards

Peter Keys (born May 30, 1965) is an American keyboardist. He is best known for his work with George Clinton in various P-Funk lineups and as a member of the rock band Lynyrd Skynyrd since 2009.

== Career ==
Keyes played and recorded with many musicians including Jay Lane (Primus, RatDog), Sam Andrew (Big Brother and the Holding Company), Peter Tork (The Monkees), Marty Friedman (Megadeth), Marty Balin (Jefferson Airplane/Starship) and Bill Spooner (The Tubes).

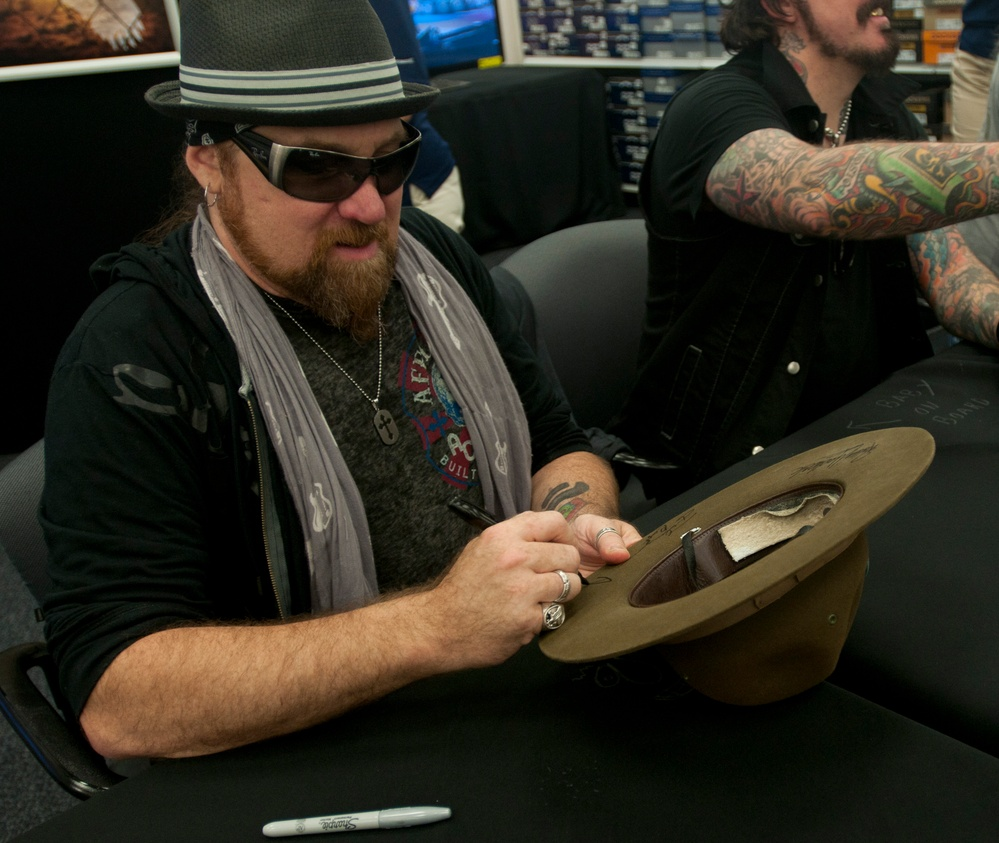
Keys signing autographs with Lynyrd Skynyrd in 2012

In 1996 he replaced Bernie Worrell in the original P-Funk lineup. Around this time he shared the stage with everyone from Bootsy Collins to Snoop Dogg and Isaac Hayes. In 2000 he moved to Detroit, Michigan, and started Shock Logic Productions. He joined the 420 Funk Mob in 2002, a band that features George Clinton and other former P-Funk members. From 2004 to 2009, Keys toured and recorded with the indie rock band SeepeopleS and is featured on three SeepeopleS' albums (Corn Syrup Conspiracy, Apocalypse Cow Volumes 1 & 2). In 2009, he moved to Nashville, and was selected to be Billy Powell's replacement in Lynyrd Skynyrd. When not touring with Lynyrd Skynyrd, Keys plays with a variety of other projects, including the Smoky White Devils.
