= A Letter from Death Row (album) =

Soundtrack album by Bret Michaels
- Released: August 25, 1998
- Recorded: 1996–1997
- Genre: Hard rock
- Length: 46:12
- Label: Ugl Records

Bret Michaels chronology
A Letter from Death Row (1998)	Songs of Life (2003)

Singles from A Letter from Death Row
- 1. "A Letter from Death Row" Released: 1998; 2. "Party Rock Band (feat. C. C. DeVille)" Released: 1998; 3. "The Last Breath (feat. Rikki Rockett)" Released: 1998; 4. ""I'd Die for You" (feat. Randy Castillo)" Released: 1998

A Letter from Death Row is a soundtrack album by Bret Michaels, the lead singer of the rock band Poison. The album was released August 25, 1998, and is the soundtrack to the movie A Letter from Death Row which Bret Michaels wrote, directed and starred in. Max T. Barnes worked as an engineer on the project which also featured guest musicians including Poison band members.

== Content ==
The album features 13 new songs. The singles include the album titled track "A Letter from Death Row" and "Party Rock Band" which features C.C. DeVille on lead guitar. The recording of "Party Rock Band" was the first time Bret Michaels and C.C. DeVille played together since 1991 when Poison parted ways with C.C. DeVille. This recording eventually led to the reunion of the original Poison lineup.

Rikki Rockett is on drums for the promo single "The Last Breath" and Randy Castillo is on drums for the song "I'd Die for You" which was released as a Maxi single.

== Film ==
A Letter from Death Row is a 1998 psychological thriller film directed by Marvin Baker and Bret Michaels. The film was released by Sheen Michaels Entertainment, a company created by Bret Michaels and actor Charlie Sheen. The film was produced by Shane Stanley and also stars Martin Sheen, Charlie Sheen, and Kristi Gibson, who was Michaels' girlfriend at the time.

== Track listing ==
1. Party Rock Band (feat. C. C. DeVille) - 2:51
2. Human Zoo - 3:15
3. The Last Breath (feat. Rikki Rockett) - 4:18
4. I'd Die for You (feat. Randy Castillo) - 3:22
5. Times Like These - 4:07
6. Little Willie - 3:18
7. The Devil Inside - 4:39
8. A Letter from Death Row - 3:45
9. Sounds of Sex (feat. The Hines Bros - Andra Hines & Dunkin Hines) - 4:05
10. "69" - 4:28
11. Angst Mary - 3:27
12. Steel Bar Blues/Violent Endings - 4:37
