= Shane Stanley =

American filmmaker and Producer

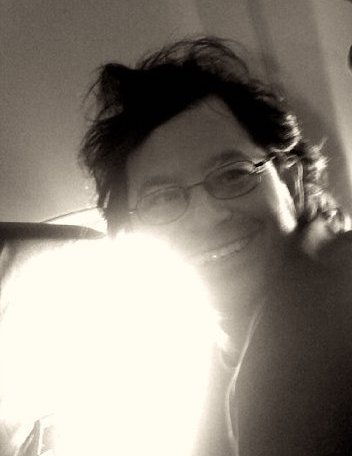
- Stanley on set The Untold Story
- Born: Shane Eric Stanley; June 15, 1971 (age 55); Encino, Los Angeles, California, US
- Occupations: Producer, writer, director, editor
- Spouses: Sharon Turner (m. 1998–2001) Val Barri (m. 2005)

Shane Stanley (born June 15, 1971) is a filmmaker, producer, director, writer and editor. His film credits include executive producing Gridiron Gang (2006), starring Dwayne "The Rock" Johnson, and directing Double Threat (2022) and Night Train (2023).

== Books ==
Stanley wrote What You Don't Learn in Film School which was published on Jan 31, 2018. In 2026, Stanley co-authored the memoir Breaking Jenny with Nic Fairbrother.

== Awards and honors ==
Stanley worked on the Emmy Award-winning documentary Desperate Passage (1988) which starred Michael Landon. Stanley has been credited with receiving an Emmy for his work on the production.

In 1992, Stanley was part of the camera crew that won a Los Angeles Area Emmy Award for Drug Watch L.A.

A Time for Life produced by Stanley, paired juvenile offenders with seriously ill children.

Street Pirates, produced by Stanley, received a CINE Golden Eagle Award for best feature documentary and a Silver Star at the WorldFest-Houston International Film Festival.

In 2004, Stanley's film A Sight for Sore Eyes received a Gold Special Jury Award at WorldFest-Houston International Film Festival and three Prix Aurora Awards for best director, best screenplay and best independent film. It received a Telly Award for outstanding achievement in film and television in 2005.

== Selected filmography ==
- Without Prejudice (2026) (director) (producer)
- The Legend of Van Dorn (2026) (director) (editor)
- Six Days in Evergreen (2026) (producer) (director) (writer) (editor)
- Night Train (2023) (producer) (director) (editor)
- Double Threat (2022) (producer) (director) (editor)
- Break Even (2020) (producer) (director) (editor)
- The Untold Story (2019) (producer) (writer) (director)
- Southern Decadence (2018) (director)
- Mistrust (2018) (producer) (writer) (director)
- My Trip Back to the Dark Side (2014) (producer) (writer) (director)
- My Trip to the Dark Side (2011) (producer) (writer) (director)
- Gridiron Gang (2006) (executive producer)
- A Sight for Sore Eyes (2005) (producer) (director) (editor)
- Street Pirates (1994) (producer) (editor)
- Drug Watch L.A. - 2nd. Edition (1992) (TV) (co-producer) (camera)
- A Time for Life (1991) (TV) (producer) (story by)
- Drug Watch L.A. (1991) (TV) (co-producer)
- Desperate Passage (1987) (co-producer) (camera)
