= Best of Ballads & Blues =

Greatest hits album by Poison
- Released: August 5, 2003
- Recorded: 1986–2003
- Genre: Glam metal; hard rock; blues rock
- Length: 75:15
- Label: Capitol

Poison chronology
| Hollyweird (2002) | Best of Ballads & Blues (2003) | The Best of Poison: 20 Years of Rock (2006) |

Professional ratings
Review scores
| Source | Rating |
|---|---|
| Allmusic | 3/5 stars |

Best of Ballads & Blues is a compilation album by the American glam metal band Poison, released by Capitol Records on August 5, 2003. Unlike Poison's Greatest Hits: 1986-1996, this compilation focuses on the group's power ballads and blues-oriented songs, and also includes acoustic recordings of "Something to Believe In" and "Stand".

The compilation debuted at #141 on the Billboard 200 chart.

Selected versions of the album featured an exclusive bonus disc featuring 3 live tracks, which was also available as a promo single.

== Track listing ==
All tracks are written by Bret Michaels, C.C. DeVille, Bobby Dall and Rikki Rockett, except where noted.

| No. | Title | Writer(s) | Original album | Length |
|---|---|---|---|---|
| 1. | "Every Rose Has Its Thorn" | | Open Up and Say... Ahh! (1988) | 4:19 |
| 2. | "Something to Believe In" | | Flesh & Blood (1990) | 5:29 |
| 3. | "Life Goes On" | | Flesh & Blood | 4:48 |
| 4. | "I Won't Forget You" | | Look What the Cat Dragged In (1986) | 3:35 |
| 5. | "Good Love" | | Open Up and Say... Ahh! | 2:52 |
| 6. | "Lay Your Body Down" | Michaels; Dall; Rockett; Blues Saraceno | Poison's Greatest Hits: 1986-1996 (1996) | 5:27 |
| 7. | "Until You Suffer Some (Fire and Ice)" | Michaels; Dall; Rockett; Richie Kotzen | Native Tongue (1993) | 4:13 |
| 8. | "Be the One" | Michaels; Dall; Rockett; Saraceno | Crack a Smile... and More! (1996) | 5:40 |
| 9. | "Life Loves a Tragedy" | | Flesh & Blood | 5:15 |
| 10. | "Only Time Will Tell" | | Swallow This Live (1991) | 4:01 |
| 11. | "Poor Boy Blues" | | Flesh & Blood | 5:19 |
| 12. | "Theatre of the Soul" | Michaels; Dall; Rockett; Kotzen | Native Tongue | 4:42 |
| 13. | "Bastard Son of a Thousand Blues" | Michaels; Dall; Rockett; Kotzen | Native Tongue | 4:57 |
| 14. | "The Last Song" | | Power to the People (2000) | 4:22 |
| 15. | "Something to Believe In" (Acoustic Version Featuring New Lyrics) | | B-side of "Life Goes On" (1991) | 6:02 |
| 16. | "Stand" (Acoustic Version) | Michaels; Dall; Rockett; Kotzen | B-side of "Until You Suffer Some (Fire and Ice)" (1993) | 4:15 |
| Total length: | | | | 75:15 |

Bonus live disc
| No. | Title | Length |
|---|---|---|
| 1. | "Every Rose Has Its Thorn" (Live) | 4:30 |
| 2. | "Something to Believe In" (Live) | 6:07 |
| 3. | "Life Goes On" (Live) | 6:05 |

== Personnel ==
- Bret Michaels - lead vocals
- Bobby Dall - bass guitar
- Rikki Rockett - drums
- C.C. DeVille - lead guitar (tracks 1–5, 9–11, 14–15)
- Blues Saraceno - lead guitar (tracks 6, 8)
- Richie Kotzen - lead guitar (tracks 7, 12–13, 16)
- Evren Göknar - mastering engineer

== Charts ==
| Chart (2003) | Peak position |
|---|---|
| US Billboard 200 | 141 |

== Poison Video Hits DVD ==
Poison Video Hits is the seventh music DVD from the glam metal band Poison released in 2005, it follows the release of The Best of Ballads & Blues: Greatest hits 2 album, and it consists of six Poison video hits.

=== Track listing ===
1. Cry Tough
2. I Want Action
3. Nothin' but a Good Time
4. Fallen Angel
5. Every Rose Has Its Thorn
6. Unskinny Bop
