= Poison Greatest Video Hits =

Video by Poison
- Released: 2001
- Genre: Hard rock, glam metal
- Label: Capitol

Poison Greatest Video Hits is the fifth DVD/video from the rock band Poison, released in 2001 following the success of the VH1 Behind the Music episode of the band.

== Background ==
The DVD was released following the Poison album Power to the People and features every Poison music video up to this point including the latest video, the album titled track "Power to the People" .

Every Poison album featured music videos up to this point except for the album Crack a Smile...and More!.

The DVD consists of the first two Poison video releases "Sight for Sore Ears" which was certified Can Gold and "Flesh, Blood, & Videotape" (which have not been released on DVD) and also features behind the scenes footage, in depth interviews, various clips and music videos from 'Swallow This Live', 'Native Tongue' and 'Power to the People' albums.

The DVD received US Gold certification in 2003.

== Track listing ==
1. Cry Tough
2. I Want Action
3. Talk Dirty To Me
4. I Won't Forget You
5. Nothin' but a Good Time
6. Fallen Angel
7. Every Rose Has Its Thorn
8. Your Mama Don't Dance
9. Unskinny Bop
10. Ride the Wind
11. Something To Believe In
12. Life Goes On
13. (Flesh & Blood) Sacrifice
14. So Tell Me Why
15. Stand
16. Until You Suffer Some (Fire And Ice)
17. Power to the People

== Band members ==
- Bret Michaels - lead vocals
- C.C. DeVille - lead guitar (except videos 15 & 16)
- Bobby Dall - bass
- Rikki Rockett - drums
- Richie Kotzen - lead guitar (videos 15 & 16 only)

== Certifications ==
Region	Certification	Certified units/sales
United States (RIAA)	Gold	500,000^{^}
^{^} Shipments figures based on certification alone.
