= Sight for Sore Ears =

Sight For Sore Ears

Video by Poison
- Released: 1989
- Genre: Glam metal
- Label: Enigma

Sight For Sore Ears is the first video album from the rock band Poison, featuring all the Poison music videos from the first two albums, Look What the Cat Dragged In and Open Up and Say... Ahh! and also features behind the scenes footage and in depth interviews. The video compilation received gold certification. It was re-released on DVD in 2001 as part of Poison Greatest Video Hits. It has also been certified by CAN gold.

== Track listing ==
1. "Cry Tough"
2. "I Want Action"
3. "Talk Dirty To Me"
4. "I Won't Forget You"
5. "Good Love (Montage)"
6. "Nothin' but a Good Time"
7. "Fallen Angel"
8. "Every Rose Has Its Thorn"
9. "Your Mama Don't Dance"

== Band members ==
- Bret Michaels - lead vocals
- C.C. DeVille - lead guitar
- Bobby Dall - bass
- Rikki Rockett - drums

== Certifications ==
Region	Certification	Certified units/sales
Canada (Music Canada)	Gold	50,000^{^}
^{^} Shipments figures based on certification alone.
