= Seven Days Live =

Video by Poison

Video by Poison
- Released: 1993
- Recorded: 1993
- Venue: Hammersmith Odeon
- Genres: Hard rock; blues rock; glam metal
- Length: 82 mins
- Labels: Picture Music; Capitol

Poison chronology
Swallow This Live: Flesh & Blood World Tour (1992)	Seven Days Live (1993)	Poison Greatest Video Hits (1996)

Professional ratings
Review scores
Source	Rating
PiercingMetal	2.5/5 stars

Seven Days Live is the third video album from the American heavy metal/glam metal band Poison, featuring a live concert at the Hammersmith Odeon, in London, England, from the Native Tongue world tour in 1993, in support of the fourth Poison studio album Native Tongue, which was certified Gold by the RIAA on April 21, 1993.

The song "7 Days Over You" was released as a promo single to promote the video release.

The video was originally released on VHS by Picture Music International and Capitol Records in 1993, and then on DVD by Cherry Red Records in 2006. It was also released as Poison Live In Concert with a different cover in 2003.

== Track listing ==
No.	Title	Writer(s)	Length
1.	"The Scream"	Bret Michaels; Bobby Dall; Rikki Rockett; Richie Kotzen
2.	"Strike Up the Band"	Michaels; Dall; Rockett; Kotzen
3.	"Ride the Wind"	Michaels; Dall; Rockett; C.C. DeVille
4.	"Good Love"	Michaels; Dall; Rockett; DeVille
5.	"Body Talk"	Michaels; Dall; Rockett; Kotzen
6.	"Something to Believe In"	Michaels; Dall; Rockett; DeVille
7.	"Stand"	Michaels; Dall; Rockett; Kotzen
8.	"Fallen Angel"	Michaels; Dall; Rockett; DeVille
9.	"Look What The Cat Dragged In"	Michaels; Dall; Rockett; DeVille
10.	"Until You Suffer Some (Fire and Ice)"	Michaels; Dall; Rockett; Kotzen
11.	"7 Days Over You"	Michaels; Dall; Rockett; Kotzen
12.	"Unskinny Bop"	Michaels; Dall; Rockett; DeVille
13.	"Talk Dirty To Me"	Michaels; Dall; Rockett; DeVille
14.	"Every Rose Has Its Thorn"	Michaels; Dall; Rockett; DeVille
15.	"Nothin' But a Good Time"	Michaels; Dall; Rockett; DeVille

== Seven Days Live CD ==
Seven Days Live

Live album by Poison
- Released: August 26, 2008
- Recorded: 1993
- Venue: Hammersmith Odeon
- Genres: Hard rock; blues rock; glam metal
- Length: 80:11
- Label: Armoury

Poison chronology
Poison'd (2007)	Seven Days Live (2008)	Live, Raw & Uncut (2008)

The audio CD version of the concert was released by Armoury Records on August 26, 2008.

In 2008, an audio CD of Poison Seven Days Live was released (August 26, 2008) from the same 1993 concert. The track listing is the same as the DVD, with the addition of "Your Mama Don't Dance".

=== Track listing ===
No.	Title	Writer(s)	Length
1.	"The Scream"	Michaels; Dall; Rockett; Kotzen	4:58
2.	"Strike Up the Band"	Michaels; Dall; Rockett; Kotzen	3:44
3.	"Ride the Wind"	Michaels; Dall; Rockett; DeVille	4:36
4.	"Good Love"	Michaels; Dall; Rockett; DeVille	4:43
5.	"Your Mama Don't Dance" (Loggins and Messina cover)	Kenny Loggins; Jim Messina	3:21
6.	"Body Talk"	Michaels; Dall; Rockett; Kotzen	7:39
7.	"Something to Believe In"	Michaels; Dall; Rockett; DeVille	6:00
8.	"Stand"	Michaels; Dall; Rockett; Kotzen	5:14
9.	"Fallen Angel"	Michaels; Dall; Rockett; DeVille	4:29
10.	"Look What The Cat Dragged In"	Michaels; Dall; Rockett; DeVille	3:15
11.	"Drum Solo"	Rockett	2:29
12.	"Until You Suffer Some (Fire and Ice)"	Michaels; Dall; Rockett; Kotzen	4:10
13.	"7 Days Over You"	Michaels; Dall; Rockett; Kotzen	4:11
14.	"Unskinny Bop"	Michaels; Dall; Rockett; DeVille	3:56
15.	"Talk Dirty To Me"	Michaels; Dall; Rockett; DeVille	6:20
16.	"Every Rose Has Its Thorn"	Michaels; Dall; Rockett; DeVille	4:39
17.	"Nothin' But a Good Time"	Michaels; Dall; Rockett; DeVille	6:27

== Personnel ==
- Bret Michaels - Lead vocals, rhythm guitar, harmonica, percussion
- Richie Kotzen - Lead Guitar, mandolin, backing vocals
- Bobby Dall - Bass, acoustic guitar, piano, backing vocals
- Rikki Rockett - Drums, percussion, backing vocals

Additional musician

- Jesse Bradman - Keyboards, piano, backing vocals
