= Great Big Hits Live! Bootleg =

Live album by Poison
- Released: July 4, 2006
- Recorded: 1999–2000
- Venue: Nashville, TN; Atlanta, GA; Charlotte, NC
- Genre: Glam metal; hard rock
- Label: Sony BMG

Poison chronology
Hollyweird (2002)	Great Big Hits Live! Bootleg (2006)	Poison'd! (2007)

Great Big Hits Live! Bootleg is an album by American glam metal band Poison, released by Sony BMG on July 4, 2006. The album consists of 10 live tracks from Poison's successful 1999-2000 Comeback tour. All the songs but three are Poison singles that charted on The Billboard Hot 100 including the number 1 hit "Every Rose Has Its Thorn".

The album is essentially Power to the People repackaged without the new studio tracks and the guitar and drum solos (live songs only). Power to the People was released in 2000 and charted at #166 on The Billboard 200 and #16 on the Australian ARIA Charts, selling more than 1.5 million copies to date reaching US Gold status.

== Track listing ==
All tracks are written by Bret Michaels, Bobby Dall, Rikki Rockett, and C.C. DeVille.

No.	Title	Length
1.	"Look What the Cat Dragged In"	3:56
2.	"I Want Action"	3:36
3.	"Something to Believe In"	6:34
4.	"Love on the Rocks"	3:32
5.	"Fallen Angel"	4:24
6.	"Let It Play"	4:03
7.	"Every Rose Has Its Thorn"	4:44
8.	"Unskinny Bop"	3:58
9.	"Nothin' But a Good Time"	4:22
10.	"Talk Dirty to Me"	3:56

== Personnel ==
- Bret Michaels – lead vocals, rhythm guitar, harmonica
- C.C. DeVille – lead guitar, backing vocals
- Bobby Dall – bass, backing vocals
- Rikki Rockett – drums, backing vocals
