= However Much I Booze =

Song by The Who

from the album The Who by Numbers
- Released: 3 October 1975
- Recorded: April – 12 June 1975
- Genre: Rock
- Length: 5:03
- Label: Polydor, MCA
- Songwriter: Pete Townshend
- Producer: Glyn Johns

The Who by Numbers track listing
- 10 tracks Side one: 1. "Slip Kid"; 2. "However Much I Booze"; 3. "Squeeze Box"; 4. "Dreaming from the Waist"; 5. "Imagine a Man"; Side two: 6. "Success Story"; 7. "They Are All in Love"; 8. "Blue, Red and Grey"; 9. "How Many Friends"; 10. "In a Hand or a Face"

"However Much I Booze" (Working title: "No Way Out") is a song by the English rock band the Who, written by Pete Townshend that is the second track on their 1975 album The Who by Numbers.

== Background ==
On stage, Townshend claimed that he wrote the song on the night that he gave up drinking. Lead singer Roger Daltrey refused to sing the song, possibly because (according to Richard Barnes) the song was too personal. Alternatively, it was speculated by authors Steve Grantley and Alan Parker that Daltrey wanted to make it clear that Townshend had the drinking problem, rather than himself.

Townshend later said about his drinking with the Who:

Drinking around the Who is the greatest thing gutter-level life can offer. The bawdiness of the humor, the sheer decadence of the amount put away, the incredible emotional release of violent outbursts against innocent hotel-room sofas; all these count to get a body through a lot of trouble. But at the end of the orgy, the real cancer still lies untackled deep in the heart.

The song, containing additional lyrics not seen in the final version, was originally demoed with the working title of "No Way Out." This version later appeared on Townshend's demo collection album, Scoop 3.

"However Much I Booze" addresses themes including loneliness, the illusion of reality within the entertainment world and Townshend's own feuding with Who lead singer Roger Daltrey. The song's cheerful melody contrasts with the grim subject matter. The melody is complemented with energetic playing from drummer Keith Moon and bassist John Entwistle, further contrasting the mood of the lyrics.

== Live history ==
"However Much I Booze" was played sporadically during the Who's 1975 tour, making it one of the three songs from The Who by Numbers to be played at that time (although "Slip Kid" was attempted during the band's 1976 tour). However, the song was abandoned following this tour.
