= Rock Champions =

Rock Champions may refer to:

- Rock Champions (April Wine album), 2000
- Rock Champions, album by Black Sabbath
- Rock Champions, album by Grand Funk Railroad
- Rock Champions (Great White album), 2000
- Poison – Rock Champions, album
- Rock Champions, album by The Quireboys
- Rock Champions, album by Saxon
- Rock Champions, album by Thunder
- Rock Champions, album by UFO
- Rock Champions, album by Uriah Heep

== See also ==
- Champions of Rock, album by April Wine
- Champions of Rock, album by Blue Öyster Cult
- Champions of Rock, album by Robin Trower
- Champions of Rock, album by UFO
