= Dreaming from the Waist =

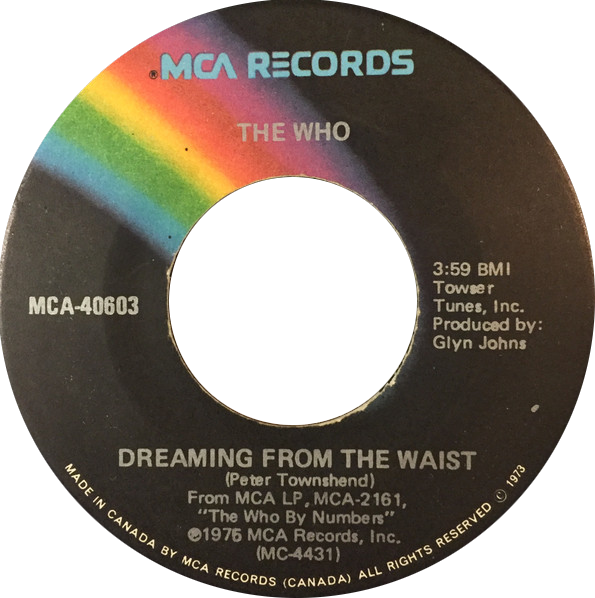
- Side B of the Canadian single

Single by the Who

from the album The Who by Numbers
- A-side: "Slip Kid" (US)
- Released: 7 August 1976
- Genre: Rock
- Length: 4:09
- Label: Polydor/MCA
- Songwriter: Pete Townshend
- Producer: Glyn Johns

The Who singles chronology
"Squeeze Box" (1975)	"Slip Kid" / "Dreaming from the Waist" (1976)	"Who Are You" (1978)

The Who by Numbers track listing
- 10 tracks Side one: 1. "Slip Kid"; 2. "However Much I Booze"; 3. "Squeeze Box"; 4. "Dreaming from the Waist"; 5. "Imagine a Man"; Side two: 6. "Success Story"; 7. "They Are All in Love"; 8. "Blue, Red and Grey"; 9. "How Many Friends"; 10. "In a Hand or a Face"

"Dreaming from the Waist" is a song by the English rock band the Who, written by Pete Townshend and released on the group's 1975 album The Who by Numbers (reissued in 1996); it also served as the B-side of the "Slip Kid" single, released in 1976 in the United States. The track's lyrics deal with sexual frustration and the restlessness associated with getting older (Townshend had turned 30 in 1975), while the music features a bass solo from John Entwistle.

A live version recorded in Swansea, Wales on 12 June 1976 appears on the reissue of The Who by Numbers and the Thirty Years of Maximum R&B box set, while the 9 December 1975 version from Cleveland was included in the Thirty Years of Maximum R&B Live video and DVD. In an interview from Thirty Years of Maximum R&B Live, Townshend declared "Dreaming from the Waist" as one of his least favorite songs to play onstage (referring to it as a "fresh turd" at the conclusion of the song's performance at the band's one-off show at Kilburn in December 1977); in humorous contrast, John Entwistle, claimed in the same series of interviews that "Dreaming from the Waist" was one of his favorite songs to perform.

== Lyrics and music ==
The original title of "Dreaming from the Waist" was "Control Myself". Self-control is the theme of this song, as it is of another song on the album, "However Much I Booze". On the earlier song the singer laments his inability to control his drinking; on this song he chastises himself for being unable to control his sexual urges.

The song's introduction includes high-pitched guitar chords that Pete Townshend found tricky to play. The end of the song includes a bass guitar solo for John Entwistle.

== Critical reception ==
Record Mirror regarded "Dreaming from the Waist" as one of the highlights of The Who by Numbers. Critic Chris Charlesworth regards it as one of the Who's best songs. Authors Steve Grantley and Alan G. Parker praise Keith Moon's drumming and especially John Entwistle's "nimble-fingered" bass guitar playing. Charlesworth concurs that Entwistle's bass solo is "a stunning display of virtuosity".

== Live history ==
"Dreaming from the Waist" debuted onstage in October 1975 and remained a staple in the band's act through 1976 and the band's one-off show at Kilburn in December 1977 (later issued as The Who at Kilburn: 1977). It was one of only two songs from The Who By Numbers that appeared regularly in the set list for the Who's tour backing the album in 1975 and 1976. It then appeared sporadically from 1979–1981 (when Kenney Jones was the band's drummer) and was referenced one more time in 1997 during an acoustic version of "Won't Get Fooled Again". As in the studio version, live renditions always showcased an Entwistle bass solo.

A live version of the song from 12 June 1976, was included on 30 Years of Maximum R&B. Charlesworth finds this performance "faultless", particularly praising the vocal harmonies and Entwistle's "immaculate bass solo".

However, Pete Townshend states this and "Sister Disco" are his least favourite songs to perform live, mostly due to Roger Daltrey’s love of both songs. In contrast, Entwistle declared in the same series of interviews that "Dreaming from the Waist" was one of his favourite songs to perform live.
