= Slip Kid =

Song by The Who

- Spanish picture sleeve

Single by the Who

from the album The Who by Numbers
- B-side: "Dreaming from the Waist"
- Released: August 1976 (US)
- Length: 4:32: 3:30 (Single version)
- Label: Polydor (UK); MCA (US)
- Songwriter: Pete Townshend
- Producer: Glyn Johns

The Who singles chronology
"Squeeze Box" (1975)	"Slip Kid" (1976)	"Who Are You" (1978)

The Who by Numbers track listing
- 10 tracks Side one: 1. "Slip Kid"; 2. "However Much I Booze"; 3. "Squeeze Box"; 4. "Dreaming from the Waist"; 5. "Imagine a Man"; Side two: 6. "Success Story"; 7. "They Are All in Love"; 8. "Blue, Red and Grey"; 9. "How Many Friends"; 10. "In a Hand or a Face"

"Slip Kid" is a song from the Who's seventh studio album, The Who by Numbers. Written originally for Pete Townshend's shelved Lifehouse rock opera, "Slip Kid" was revived in 1975. The song was originally written as a warning about the music business, though Townshend has pointed out the song's relevance in different contexts. The song was released as a single in the US, backed by "Dreaming from the Waist", but failed to chart.

"Slip Kid" has since seen praise from critics, appearing on lists of the best Who songs and often being described as underrated. It has appeared on multiple compilation albums since its release and has been performed live intermittently throughout the Who's touring career, including an unrehearsed performance in 2016.

== Background ==
"Slip Kid," like many other tracks released by the Who in the 1970s, was originally to be included in Pete Townshend's shelved Lifehouse rock opera. However, when The Who by Numbers was being created, the song was resurrected to be used in the album. A demo of this song was included on Lifehouse Chronicles.

Pete Townshend wrote "Slip Kid" as a warning about the music industry; he explained, "'Slip Kid' came across as a warning to young kids getting into music that it would hurt them — it was almost parental in its assumed wisdom." In 2015, Townshend reflected on the song's continued relevance, saying, "You could put it into the voice of some young Islamic student who decides to go fight in Syria and ends up in ISIS being forced to chop people’s heads off, and it would fit".

== Music and lyrics ==
It starts off with time signature 4/4 syncopated beat with drum and muted cowbell percussion. Pete Townshend counting, "one, two, three, four, five, six, seven, eight." After the counting, Pete Townshend's guitar comes in. The song starts with a shuffle rhythm. The music has a danceable salsa beat and includes an uncharacteristic one-note guitar solo played by Pete Townshend. Nicky Hopkins plays piano on the song. Townshend and Roger Daltrey alternate vocal lines.

The lyrics are a complaint about how it is impossible to avoid responsibility. Author Chris Charlesworth considers the song partially autobiographical, being about "a rock 'n' roll kid who's lost when he grows up." The rebellious teenager of the song learns that "there's no easy way to be free" and that this is true for everyone.

== Release and reception ==
"Slip Kid" was first released on The Who by Numbers in 1975. Following the album's release, "Slip Kid" was released as a follow-up single to "Squeeze Box" in the United States and Canada, backed with "Dreaming from the Waist". The song failed to chart. "Slip Kid" has also appeared on compilation albums such as The Story of The Who (1976), Hooligans (1981), 30 Years of Maximum R&B (1994) and The Who Hits 50! (2014).

Cash Box said that "the chorus has got the same kind of powerful hook as did 'Squeeze Box,'" "the arrangement is...economical, hard driving rock" and there is "nice guitar work". Record World called it "a natural single" and said that "the song finds Daltrey in fine voice and Townshend hitting those windmill chords he made famous." Music critic Robert Christgau considers "Slip Kid" one of the two songs on The Who by Numbers to "break out of the bind" of joylessness he finds on the album. Author John Atkins considers it "a perfect performance that bridges a classical Who song structure with Townshend's revisionist lyrics and hints at a darker mood that becomes more evident as the album progresses." AllMusic critic Stephen Thomas Erlewine praises the song's "simple power". Rolling Stone named the song the 36th best Who song, while Ultimate Classic Rock ranked the song the 12th best Who song ever, saying, "Easily the most underrated single in the Who's career, 'Slip Kid' is special". Ultimate Classic Rock also ranked the song the most underrated Who song.

Pearl Jam frontman Eddie Vedder turned to the song after the 2000 incident at the Roskilde Festival, saying "There's a line [in the song], 'There's no easy way to be free'. I was thinking, 'I couldn't agree with you more'".

== Live history ==
This was performed live a few times on the Who's European leg of the 1976 tour and also the American leg before being dropped. A small part of this song was played in one of the concerts of the band's 1979 tour, particularly in Buffalo on 4 December 1979. During the second date of their concerts in London in 2008, "Slip Kid" was performed again, for the first time in 32 years. The song was again performed a few times on The Who Hits 50! tour. Townshend reflected at the time, "It's one of those songs I thought I would hate playing because it’s tricky, but I've been really enjoying it. It feels very new".

On 24 March 2016, the Who, performing in Washington, D.C. played an unrehearsed version of "Slip Kid" (first time since May 2015) after Roger Daltrey announced that Pete Townshend would not be able to sing the planned "Eminence Front" due to a throat ailment. Daltrey explained, "Pete can't sing with a voice like that - it'll just do more damage. So we'll have a go at something. We kinda rehearsed it the day before yesterday. It'll be a bit lumpy, It'll be a bit bumpy. But who gives a sh*t. It's rock!"

== Personnel ==
- Roger Daltrey – lead vocals
- Pete Townshend – electric guitar, backing vocals
- John Entwistle – bass guitar, backing vocals
- Keith Moon – drums
- Nicky Hopkins – piano
- Uncredited – percussion

== Cover versions ==
A cover version was featured on the soundtrack album Sons of Anarchy: Songs of Anarchy Vol. 3, covered by Anvil feat. Franky Perez.
