= Nothing But a Good Time! Unauthorized =

Nothing but a Good Time! Unauthorized

Video by Poison
- Released: 2003, 2006
- Genre: Hard rock, glam metal
- Length: 55 mins.

Nothing but a Good Time! Unauthorized is a documentary film centered around U.S. hard rock/glam metal band Poison that was released in 2003 following the distribution of the band's studio album Hollyweird. Taking its title from the 1988 Poison single "Nothin' But a Good Time", it features interviews with related musicians such as Bret Michaels and C.C. DeVille

Despite the subject material covered, the movie includes neither live performances from the band nor any musical pieces from their studio releases. It was developed without the creative control of Poison members.

== Alternate versions ==
Rock Legends is the import version, the same DVD with a different cover and title.

In 2006 the DVD was re-released under the title Stand on the Road with a new cover (a Crack a Smile album photo, despite no material from Crack a Smile featuring on the video), and Poison music videos were included this time.

In 2009 the DVD was re-released yet again under a new cover and title: Poison: Rock Power.

== Track listing ==
1. Every Rose Has Its Thorn
2. Unskinny Bop
3. I Won't Forget You
4. Stand
5. Your Mama Don't Dance
6. Ride the Wind - start + end credits

== Band members ==
- Bret Michaels - lead vocals
- Bobby Dall - bass guitar
- Rikki Rockett - drums
- C.C. DeVille - lead guitar
- Richie Kotzen - lead guitar (Video 4)
