= Live, Raw & Uncut =

Video by Poison
- Released: July 15, 2008
- Recorded: August 2, 2007
- Venue: Verizon Wireless Amphitheater, Maryland Heights, MO
- Genre: Glam metal; hard rock
- Label: Koch Records

Poison chronology
Poison'd! (2007)	Live, Raw & Uncut (2008)	Poison – Box Set (Collector's Edition) (2009)

Professional ratings
Review scores
Source	Rating
PiercingMetal	4/5 stars

Live, Raw & Uncut is a live video album by the glam metal band Poison, released by Koch Records on July 15, 2008. The video was recorded at the Verizon Wireless Amphitheater in Maryland Heights, Missouri on August 2, 2007 during the band's Poison'd! tour.

The video sold around 2,400 copies in its first week of release to debut at position No. 8 on Billboard's Top Music Videos chart.

== Track listing ==
All tracks are written by Bret Michaels, Bobby Dall, Rikki Rockett, and C.C. DeVille, except where noted.

DVD
No.	Title	Writer(s)	Length
1.	"Look What the Cat Dragged In"
2.	"I Want Action"
3.	"Ride the Wind"
4.	"I Won't Forget You"
5.	"What I Like About You" (The Romantics cover)	Wally Palmar; Mike Skill; Jimmy Marinos
6.	"Guitar Solo"	DeVille
7.	"I Hate Every Bone in Your Body But Mine"
8.	"Something To Believe In"
9.	"Can't You See" (The Marshall Tucker Band cover)	Toy Caldwell
10.	"Your Mama Don't Dance" (Loggins and Messina cover)	Kenny Loggins; Jim Messina
11.	"I Need to Know" (Tom Petty and the Heartbreakers cover)	Tom Petty
12.	"Drum Solo"	Rockett
13.	"Unskinny Bop"
14.	"Every Rose Has Its Thorn"
15.	"Fallen Angel"
16.	"Talk Dirty to Me"
17.	"Nothin' But a Good Time"

CD
No.	Title	Writer(s)	Length
1.	"Look What the Cat Dragged In"		4:26
2.	"I Want Action"		4:07
3.	"Ride the Wind"		4:56
4.	"I Won't Forget You"		3:27
5.	"Guitar Solo"	DeVille	6:20
6.	"I Hate Every Bone in Your Body But Mine"		3:53
7.	"Something To Believe In"		6:07
8.	"Drum Solo"	Rockett	5:24
9.	"Unskinny Bop"		5:08
10.	"Every Rose Has Its Thorn"		4:28
11.	"Fallen Angel"		4:19
12.	"Talk Dirty to Me"		5:31
13.	"Nothin' But a Good Time"		5:00

== Personnel ==
- Bret Michaels: lead vocals, guitars, harmonica
- C.C. DeVille: guitar, backing vocals, lead vocals on "I Hate Every Bone in Your Body But Mine"
- Bobby Dall: bass, backing vocals
- Rikki Rockett: drums, backing vocals
- Will Doughty: keyboards, piano, backing vocals

== Charts ==
Chart (2008)	Peak position
Top Music Videos	8
