= Shut Up, Make Love =

Single by Poison

from the album Crack a Smile...and More!
- B-side: "Shut Up Make Love Rap Tapin Lip Smackin"
- Released: 2000
- Recorded: 1995
- Genre: Hard rock
- Label: Capitol
- Songwriters: Michaels, Dall, Rockett, Saraceno

Poison singles chronology
"Body Talk" (1994)	"Shut Up, Make Love" (2000)	"Be the One" (2000)

"Shut Up, Make Love" is a song by American rock band Poison. Released in 2000, it was the first single presented to radio stations from their 2000 album, Crack a Smile...and More!.

== Release ==
The song also appears on the second promo single "Be the One" as a B-side. The song was the first Poison single with lead guitarist Blues Saraceno.

== Track listing ==
1. Shut Up, Make Love - Rock Radio Edit 3:17
2. Shut Up, Make Love - Lip Smackin' Rap-A-Tappin' 3:53
3. Shut Up, Make Love - Call Out Edit 0:11
