= Rock Champions (Poison album) =

Compilation album by Poison
- Released: September 25, 2001
- Genre: Glam metal; hard rock
- Length: 53:07
- Label: EMI Plus
- Producer: Ric Browde; Tom Werman; Bruce Fairbairn; Richie Zito

Poison chronology
| Power to the People (2000) | Rock Champions (2001) | Hollyweird (2002) |

Rock Champions is a compilation album by American rock band Poison, released in Europe in 2001 by EMI Plus. The album consists of 14 studio tracks from the band's previous albums, from Look What the Cat Dragged In to Native Tongue.

== Track listing ==
| No. | Title | Writer(s) | Original album | Length |
|---|---|---|---|---|
| 1. | "Unskinny Bop" | Bret Michaels; Bobby Dall; Rikki Rockett; C.C. DeVille | Flesh & Blood (1990) | 3:49 |
| 2. | "Your Mama Don't Dance" (Loggins and Messina cover) | Kenny Loggins; Jim Messina | Open Up and Say... Ahh! (1988) | 3:02 |
| 3. | "Look What the Cat Dragged In" | Michaels; Dall; Rockett; DeVille | Look What the Cat Dragged In (1986) | 3:11 |
| 4. | "Play Dirty" | Michaels; Dall; Rockett; DeVille | Look What the Cat Dragged In | 4:07 |
| 5. | "Body Talk" | Michaels; Dall; Rockett; Richie Kotzen | Native Tongue (1993) | 3:59 |
| 6. | "Every Rose Has Its Thorn" | Michaels; Dall; Rockett; DeVille | Open Up and Say... Ahh! | 4:20 |
| 7. | "Ain't That the Truth" | Michaels; Dall; Rockett; Kotzen | Native Tongue | 3:26 |
| 8. | "Bring It Home" | Michaels; Dall; Rockett; Kotzen | Native Tongue | 3:55 |
| 9. | "#1 Bad Boy" | Michaels; Dall; Rockett; DeVille | Look What the Cat Dragged In | 3:17 |
| 10. | "Ride Child Ride" | Michaels; Dall; Rockett; Kotzen | Native Tongue | 3:54 |
| 11. | "Want Some, Need Some" | Michaels; Dall; Rockett; DeVille | Look What the Cat Dragged In | 3:41 |
| 12. | "Let Me Go to the Show" | Michaels; Dall; Rockett; DeVille | Look What the Cat Dragged In | 2:47 |
| 13. | "Bastard Son of a Thousand Blues" | Michaels; Dall; Rockett; Kotzen | Native Tongue | 4:58 |
| 14. | "Theatre of the Soul" | Michaels; Dall; Rockett; Kotzen | Native Tongue | 4:39 |
| Total length: | | | | 53:07 |

== Personnel ==
- Bret Michaels - lead vocals
- Bobby Dall - bass guitar
- Rikki Rockett - drums
- C.C. DeVille - lead guitar (tracks 1, 2, 3, 4, 6, 9, 11, 12)
- Richie Kotzen - lead guitar (tracks 5, 7, 8, 10, 13, 14)
