= Never Look Back =

Never Look Back may refer to:

== Music ==
- Never Look Back (Blues Saraceno album), 1989
- Never Look Back, an album by Darby Mills
- Never Look Back, an album by Ebony Alleyne
- Never Look Back, an album by Joujouka
- Never Look Back, an album by Electric Touch
- Never Look Back (Goldfinger album), 2020
- "Never Look Back" (Doris Day song), a song from the 1955 film Love Me or Leave Me
- "Never Look Back" (DuMonde song), 2001
- "Never Look Back", a song by Imelda May from the album 11 Past the Hour

== Other uses ==
- Never Look Back (film)
- Never Look Back, a novel by Mignon G. Eberhart
- Never Look Back, a novel by Lesley Pearse
