= Hollyweird (disambiguation) =

Hollyweird is an album by the band Poison.

Hollyweird may also refer to:

- Live in Hollyweird, an album by the band Unwritten Law
- Hollyweird, a 1999 film directed by Penelope Spheeris
- pejorative expression for Hollywood
