= Nothing but a good time =

Nothing but a good time (or various different forms of the saying) may refer to:

- "Nothin' But a Good Time", a 1988 song by Poison
- Nothing But a Good Time! Unauthorized, a 2003 documentary film about Poison
- Nothin' But a Good Time: The Poison Collection, a 2010 CD box set by Poison
- Nothing But a Good Time Tour, a concert tour by Poison during the middle of 2018

== See also ==
- "Nothing But Time (song)"
