= Rockstar (Poison song) =

Single by Poison

from the album Hollyweird
- Released: May 27, 2001
- Recorded: April 2001
- Genre: Glam metal, hard rock
- Length: 3:33
- Label: Cyanide Records
- Songwriters: Bret Michaels, C.C. DeVille
- Producers: Thom Panunzio, Bret Michaels

Poison singles chronology
| "The Last Song" (2000) | "Rockstar" (2001) | "Squeeze Box" (2002) |

"Rockstar" is a song by American rock band Poison. It was released as the first single from their then upcoming album Hollyweird.

== Background ==
The song was first released as a digital download single on May 27, 2001 and then as a CD single in May 2002. The lyrics were written by Bret Michaels and C.C. DeVille.

== Live performance ==
"Rockstar" has been performed 20 times by the band in concert. Its first performance was on May 27, 2001. It was a regular in the setlist on the Glam, Slam, Metal, Jam Tour, but only played once on the Hollyweird World Tour.

== Personnel ==
- Bret Michaels - lead vocals, rhythm guitar, keyboards
- C.C. DeVille - lead guitar, backing vocals
- Bobby Dall - bass, backing vocals
- Rikki Rockett - drums, backing vocals
