= Shooting Star (Poison song) =

Single by Poison

from the album Hollyweird
- B-side: "Wasteland"
- Released: November 2002
- Recorded: January 2002
- Genre: Glam metal
- Label: Cyanide Records
- Songwriters: Bret Michaels, C.C. DeVille
- Producers: Thom Panunzio, Bret Michaels

Poison singles chronology
"Squeeze Box" (2002)	"Shooting Star" (2002)	"We're An American Band" (2006)

"Shooting Star" is a song by American rock band Poison. It is the third and final single released from Poison's 7th studio album Hollyweird, which debuted at #103 on the Billboard 200 and #8 on the Independent Albums chart. The song was released as a single in November 2002.

== Fallen Angel 2 ==
The song has been referred to as Part 2 to the band's 1988 hit single "Fallen Angel".

The lyrics were written by Bret Michaels and C.C. DeVille. The B-side to the single is "Wasteland".

== Albums ==
"Shooting Star" is on the following albums.

- Hollyweird
- The Best of Poison: 20 Years of Rock

== Personnel ==
Credits adapted from liner notes of Hollyweird.

- Bret Michaels - lead vocals, rhythm guitar, keyboards
- C.C. DeVille - lead guitar, backing vocals
- Bobby Dall - bass guitar, backing vocals
- Rikki Rockett - drums, backing vocals
