= The Story of The Who =

Compilation album by the Who
- Released: 24 September 1976
- Genre: Rock
- Length: 89:27
- Label: Polydor

The Who chronology
The Who by Numbers (1975)	The Story of The Who (1976)	Who Are You (1978)

Professional ratings
Review scores
Source	Rating
The Encyclopedia of Popular Music	3/5 stars

The Story of The Who is a 2-LP compilation album by the English rock band the Who. The album was released in the UK in September 1976. The album reached number two in the UK charts. Another version of this collection with a different track listing was also released in Japan. This collection has not been released on CD. However, it was reissued on 20 April 2024 for Record Store Day.

The exploding pinball machine comes from film shot for a TV advertisement of the album.

John Entwistle didn't think the album was truly definitive. The Who could only release the tracks that they had the rights to.

== Track listing ==
All songs written by Pete Townshend except where noted.

Side one
No.	Title	Writer(s)	Original release	Length
1.	"Magic Bus" (Extended Mix)		Meaty Beaty Big and Bouncy (1971)	4:27
2.	"Substitute"		Non album single (1966)	3:46
3.	"Boris the Spider"	John Entwistle	A Quick One (1966)	2:28
4.	"Run Run Run"		A Quick One	2:29
5.	"I'm a Boy" (Longer Version)		Meaty Beaty Big and Bouncy	3:40
6.	"Heat Wave"	Holland–Dozier–Holland	A Quick One	1:54
7.	"My Generation" (Live: Edited Version)		Live at Leeds (1970)	2:31

Side two
No.	Title	Original release	Length
1.	"Pictures of Lily"	Non album single (1967)	2:44
2.	"Happy Jack"	Non album single (1966)	2:13
3.	"The Seeker"	Non album single (1970)	3:12
4.	"I Can See for Miles"	The Who Sell Out (1967)	4:17
5.	"Bargain"	Who's Next (1971)	5:31
6.	"Squeeze Box"	The Who By Numbers (1975)	2:42

Side three
No.	Title	Writer(s)	Original release	Length
1.	"Amazing Journey"		Tommy (1969)	3:23
2.	"The Acid Queen"		Tommy	3:34
3.	"Do You Think it's Alright?"		Tommy	0:26
4.	"Fiddle About"	Entwistle	Tommy	1:30
5.	"Pinball Wizard"		Tommy	2:58
6.	"I'm Free"		Tommy	2:39
7.	"Tommy's Holiday Camp"	Keith Moon	Tommy	0:57
8.	"We're Not Gonna Take It"		Tommy	7:01

Side four
No.	Title	Writer(s)	Original release	Length
1.	"Summertime Blues" (Live)	Eddie Cochran, Jerry Capehart	Live at Leeds	3:29
2.	"Baba O'Riley"		Who's Next	4.59
3.	"Behind Blue Eyes"		Who's Next	3:40
4.	"Slip Kid"		The Who By Numbers	4:26
5.	"Won't Get Fooled Again"		Who's Next	8:31

Because The Who by Numbers was released by CBS/Sony in Japan, the Japanese release had a slightly different track listing. "Squeeze Box" and "Slip Kid" were replaced by "Mary Anne with the Shaky Hand" and "Dogs", respectively. Also, the live edit of "My Generation" is replaced by the original 1965 version.

== Charts ==
=== Weekly charts ===
Chart (1976)	Peak position
New Zealand Albums (RMNZ)	19
UK Albums (OCC)	2

=== Year-end charts ===
Chart (1976)	Position
UK Albums (OCC)	39

== Certifications and sales ==
Region	Certification	Certified units/sales
United Kingdom (BPI)	Gold	100,000^{^}
^{^} Shipments figures based on certification alone.
