= So Tell Me Why =

Single by Poison

from the album Swallow This Live
- B-side: "Unskinny Bop (Live); Guitar Solo (UK clear vinyl)"
- Released: November 1991
- Recorded: 1991
- Genre: Glam metal
- Label: Capitol
- Songwriters: Bret Michaels; Bobby Dall; Rikki Rockett; C.C. DeVille

Poison singles chronology
"(Flesh & Blood) Sacrifice" (1991)	"So Tell Me Why" (1991)	"Stand" (1993)

Music videos
- "So Tell Me Why" on YouTube

"So Tell Me Why" is a single by American hard rock band Poison, from their 1991 Swallow This Live album. The song peaked at number 25 on the UK Singles chart

== Background ==
The song was one of four new studio tracks on the live hits album, the others being "Only Time Will Tell", "'No More Lookin' Back (Poison Jazz)" and "Souls On Fire". This was the last single with C.C. DeVille until 2000's Power to the People.

Swallow This Live was certified Gold.

== Albums ==
"So Tell Me Why" is on the following albums.

- Swallow This Live
- Poison's Greatest Hits: 1986-1996
- Poison - Box Set (Collector's Edition)
- Double Dose: Ultimate Hits

== Chart performance ==
Chart (1991–92)	Peak position
Australia (ARIA)	142
UK Singles (OCC)	25
