= Power to the People (Poison album) =

Live album with studio tracks by Poison
- Released: June 13, 2000
- Recorded: 1999–2000
- Genre: Glam metal; hard rock
- Length: 70:09
- Label: Cyanide Music
- Producer: Richie Zito (Tr.1 to 5); Jim Faraci; Poison (tr. 6 to 17)

Poison chronology
Crack a Smile... and More! (2000)	Power to the People (2000)	Rock Champions (2001)

Singles from Power to the People
- 1. "Power to the People" Released: May 23, 2000; 2. "The Last Song" Released: July 2000

Professional ratings
Review scores
Source	Rating
AllMusic	2/5 stars

Power to the People is a live album by the American rock band Poison, released on June 13, 2000, on the band's independent label, Cyanide Music. It marked the return of the original lineup, together for the first time since 1991's Swallow This Live with the return of C.C. DeVille who replaced Blues Saraceno.

== Release and promotion ==
The album is a part studio, part live album consisting of five newly recorded studio tracks and 12 live tracks from Poison's successful 1999–2000 greatest hits reunion tour.

The album was re-packaged and re-released in 2006 as Great Big Hits Live! Bootleg without the studio tracks or drum and guitar solos. (Live hits only version)

== Music and lyrics ==
The title track featured a rap-tinged sound which was influenced by contemporary nu metal and rap metal bands. In a 2000 interview, Bret Michaels described the song as being a tribute to Poison fans.

An aggressive, ass kickin' opener that was very raw, very real and very live onstage. This song is all of that. It really allows us to explode both on the album and onstage. We wanted something that really expressed our thanks to the fans and we hit it on the head with this. It may sound cliche, but this one truly is both for and about the greatest fans in the world.

— Bret Michaels,

Michaels has labelled "Can't Bring Me Down" as "one of the most uplifting songs that we've done in a long time".

It's all about will power and never losing that sense of fight which we could tell you a thing or two about. Getting knocked down but not staying down. It doesn't matter whether it's a girl or a job, or a boss or whatever. It's about always getting back up.

— Bret Michaels,

== Reception ==
The album charted at No. 166 on the U.S. Billboard 200, No. 12 on the Top Independent Albums. The album sold over 9,000 copies in its first week of release, a relatively high number for an album released under an independent label.

The first single was the album titled track "Power to the People" which featured a music video that was included on the Poison DVD, Poison Greatest Video Hits, released in the following year. The second single was the power ballad "The Last Song" which featured on the 2006 greatest hits album The Best of Poison: 20 Years of Rock.

Reception of the album has been mixed with AllMusic's review of it being 2/5 stars, and the House of Shred review being 8/10 stars. Customer reviews come it at around 4/5 stars on Amazon.com

== Track listing ==
All tracks are written by Bret Michaels, Bobby Dall, Rikki Rockett, and C.C. DeVille, except where noted.

No.	Title	Writer(s)	Length
1.	"Power to the People"		3:20
2.	"Can't Bring Me Down"		3:29
3.	"The Last Song"		4:21
4.	"Strange"		3:16
5.	"I Hate Every Bone In Your Body But Mine" (featuring C.C. DeVille on vocals)		3:10
6.	"Intro / Look What the Cat Dragged In" (Live)		4:23
7.	"I Want Action" (Live)		4:40
8.	"Something to Believe In" (Live)		4:23
9.	"Love on the Rocks" (Live)		3:30
10.	"C.C. (Solo)" (Live)	DeVille	1:29
11.	"Fallen Angel" (Live)		4:38
12.	"Let It Play" (Live)		4:14
13.	"Rikki (Solo)" (Live)	Rockett	4:53
14.	"Every Rose Has Its Thorn" (Live)		4:52
15.	"Unskinny Bop" (Live)		4:05
16.	"Nothin' But a Good Time" (Live)		4:29
17.	"Talk Dirty to Me" (Live)		4:45
Total length:			70:09

== Personnel ==
- Bret Michaels — lead vocals, rhythm guitar
- C.C. DeVille — lead guitar, backing vocals, lead vocals on "I Hate Every Bone In Your Body But Mine"
- Bobby Dall — bass, backing vocals
- Rikki Rockett — drums, backing vocals

== Singles ==
- "Power to the People" — May 23, 2000
- "The Last Song" — July 2000

== Charts ==
Chart (2002)	Peak position
US Billboard 200	166
US Independent Albums (Billboard)	12
