= Plaid (album) =

Studio album by Blues Saraceno
- Released: February 28, 1992
- Recorded: Mid-1991 at Blues Saraceno's home studio in Middletown, Connecticut; Horizon West Studios in West Haven, Connecticut
- Genre: Instrumental rock
- Length: 31:42
- Label: Guitar Recordings
- Producer: Blues Saraceno, John Stix

Blues Saraceno chronology
Never Look Back (1989)	Plaid (1992)	Hairpick (1994)

Professional ratings
Review scores
Source	Rating
AllMusic	3/5 stars

Plaid is the second studio album by guitarist Blues Saraceno, released on February 28, 1992 through Guitar Recordings.

== Track listing ==
All tracks are written by Blues Saraceno, except where noted.

No.	Title	Length
1.	"Last Train Out"	2:17
2.	"Elvis Talking (You Think It's Over But It's Not)"	3:21
3.	"The Scratch"	2:42
4.	"Friday's Walk"	2:54
5.	"A Little More Cream, Please"	2:37
6.	"Girth"	2:18
7.	"A Lighter Shade of Plaid"	4:07
8.	"Cat's Squirrel" (trad., arr. Saraceno, John Stix, Joe Franco)	2:27
9.	"L.A. Vignette"	1:24
10.	"Exit 21"	3:24
11.	"Tommy Gun"	4:11
Total length:		31:42

== Personnel ==
- Blues Saraceno – guitar, bass, engineering, mixing, production
- John Stix – slide guitar, mixing, production
- Steve Blucher – lap steel guitar
- Joe Franco – drums
- Alex Saraceno – harmonica
- Vic Steffens – engineering, mixing
- Chris Brown – sequencing, digital editing
- George Marino – mastering
