= The Who by Numbers =

Studio album by the Who
- Released: 3 October 1975
- Recorded: April – 12 June 1975
- Studios: Shepperton Studios' soundstage (Shepperton, Surrey, England) using Ronnie Lane's Mobile Studio
- Genre: Rock · country rock
- Length: 37:19
- Labels: Polydor (UK); MCA (US)
- Producer: Glyn Johns

The Who chronology
Tommy (Soundtrack) (1975)	The Who by Numbers (1975)	The Story of The Who (1976)

Singles from The Who by Numbers
- 1. "Squeeze Box" Released: November 1975; 2. "Slip Kid" Released: August 1976

The Who by Numbers is the seventh studio album by the English rock band the Who, released on 3 October 1975 in the United Kingdom through Polydor Records, and on 6 October 1975 in the United States by MCA Records. It was named the tenth-best album of the year in The Village Voice Pazz & Jop critics poll.

== Background ==
Pete Townshend has claimed that the band recorded practically every song he had written for The Who by Numbers, partially due to the writer's block that he was experiencing at the time. The songs on the album were, for the most part, more introspective and personal than many other songs that the band had released. Townshend's 30th birthday occurred in May 1975; he was troubled with thoughts of being too old to play rock and roll and that the band was losing its relevance. He began to feel disenchanted with the music industry, a feeling that he carried into his songs. He said of the songs on the album:

The songs were written with me stoned out of my brain in my living room, crying my eyes out... detached from my own work and from the whole project... I felt empty.

After concluding the tour for the Quadrophenia album in June 1974, the Who took an extended hiatus and did not perform live for more than a year. John Entwistle kept himself occupied by playing solo gigs. In addition, the band spent this time filming Tommy, based on their rock opera of the same title.

This was the band's first album on Polydor. The sessions for The Who by Numbers began in April 1975 and continued through early June. The album was released in October and the band supported it with a tour, which spanned some 70 concerts before concluding in the autumn of 1976.

For the album's recording, the band recruited producer Glyn Johns. The band had worked previously with Johns on the 1971 album Who's Next. Compared to previous Who albums, The Who by Numbers took an unusually long time to complete (nearly three months) and was marred by numerous breaks and interruptions due to the band members' growing boredom and lack of interest. It features some of the darkest songs ever recorded by the band. Only the songs on the first side of The Who by Numbers were performed live, and only "Squeeze Box" became a concert staple. "Imagine a Man" was performed live for the first time by the band in May 2019, nearly 44 years after its release (although Roger Daltrey had featured the song in a solo concert in February 1994). Townshend said of the album's recording sessions:

I felt partly responsible because the Who recording schedule had, as usual, dragged on and on, sweeping all individuals and their needs aside. Glyn worked harder on The Who by Numbers than I've ever seen him. He had to, not because the tracks were weak or the music poor but because the group was so useless. We played cricket between takes or went to the pub. I personally had never done that before. I felt detached from my own songs, from the whole record. Recording the album seemed to take me nowhere. Roger [Daltrey] was angry with the world at the time. Keith [Moon] seemed as impetuous as ever, on the wagon one minute, off the next. John [Entwistle] was obviously gathering strength throughout the whole period; the great thing about it was he seemed to know we were going to need him more than ever before in the coming year.

== Album cover ==
The album cover, on which the band members' bodies are depicted as connect the dots puzzles, was drawn by John Entwistle. In 1996, when asked about the cover, he replied: "The first [piece of artwork] release[d] is The Who by Numbers cover, which I never got paid for, so now I'm going to get paid. (laughs) We were taking it in turns to do the covers. It was Pete's turn before me and we did the Quadrophenia cover, which cost about the same as a small house back then, about £16,000. My cover cost £32."

== Release and reception ==
Professional ratings
Review scores
Source	Rating
AllMusic	4/5 stars
Christgau's Record Guide	B+
The Encyclopedia of Popular Music	3/5 stars
MusicHound Rock	4/5
The Rolling Stone Album Guide	3/5 stars
Tom Hull	B

The Who by Numbers peaked at number 7 on the UK Albums Chart and number 8 on the Billboard Top LPs & Tape album chart in the US. "Squeeze Box" was also a Top 20 hit in both Britain and America, although the US follow-up, "Slip Kid", failed to chart.

The Rolling Stone review of The Who by Numbers stated: "They may have made their greatest album in the face of [their personal problems]. But only time will tell."

In an interview from Thirty Years of Maximum R&B, Townshend declared "Dreaming from the Waist" and "Sister Disco" (from Who Are You) as his least favourite songs to play on stage. In contrast, Entwistle declared in the same series of interviews that "Dreaming from the Waist" was one of his favourite songs to perform live. Daltrey referred to the album as his favourite in his memoir.

== Remasters and reissues ==
The 1996 remaster was remixed by Jon Astley.

On 24 December 2011, the album was remastered and reissued in Japan using the original mix. The live bonus tracks from the previous edition were included on the reissue. The packaging replicated the original vinyl release of the album.

On 1 September 2026, The Who announced that the album would be getting a Super Deluxe Edition featuring new remasters, demos, outtakes and a live album.

== Track listing ==
All songs written by Pete Townshend, except where noted.

Side one
No.	Title	Length
1.	"Slip Kid"	4:29
2.	"However Much I Booze"	5:03
3.	"Squeeze Box"	2:41
4.	"Dreaming from the Waist"	4:08
5.	"Imagine a Man"	4:00
Total length:		20:21

Side two
No.	Title	Writer(s)	Length
1.	"Success Story"	John Entwistle	3:20
2.	"They Are All in Love"		3:00
3.	"Blue Red and Grey"		2:47
4.	"How Many Friends"		4:06
5.	"In a Hand or a Face"		3:25
Total length:			16:38

1996 reissue bonus tracks
No.	Title	Length
11.	"Squeeze Box" (Live at the Vetch Field, Swansea, Wales on 12 June 1976)	4:13
12.	"Behind Blue Eyes" (Live at the Vetch Field, Swansea, Wales on 12 June 1976)	3:41
13.	"Dreaming from the Waist" (Live at the Vetch Field, Swansea, Wales on 12 June 1976)	4:52
Total length:		12:46

== Personnel ==
The Who

- Roger Daltrey – lead vocals
- Pete Townshend – guitar, keyboards, banjo, accordion, ukulele, backing vocals, lead vocals on "However Much I Booze" and "Blue, Red And Grey"
- John Entwistle – bass, French horn, trumpet, backing vocals, 2nd lead vocal on "Success Story"
- Keith Moon – drums

Additional musicians

- Nicky Hopkins – piano

Production

- Glyn Johns – producer, engineer, mixing
- Jon Astley – remixing (1996 reissue)
- Chris Charlesworth – executive producer 1996 reissue
- Bill Curbishley – executive producer
- Richard Evans – design of 1996 reissue and the 2026 Super Deluxe Edition box set
- Doug Sax – mastering
- Bob Ludwig – remastering 1996 reissue
- Robert Rosenberg – executive producer
- John Entwistle – album cover art
- John Swenson – liner notes 1996 reissue
- Chris Walter – photography 1996 reissue

== Charts ==
Chart performance for The Who by Numbers
Chart (1975–1976)	Peak position
Australian Albums (Kent Music Report)	29
Canada Top Albums/CDs (RPM)	9
New Zealand Albums (RMNZ)	29
UK Albums (Official Charts)	7
US Billboard 200	8

Chart (2026)	Peak position
Austrian Albums (Ö3 Austria)	29
Belgian Albums (Ultratop Flanders)	71
Belgian Albums (Ultratop Wallonia)	109
German Albums (Offizielle Top 100)	8
German Pop Albums (Offizielle Top 100)	5
Norwegian Physical Albums (IFPI Norge)	7
Swiss Albums (Schweizer Hitparade)	40

== Certifications ==
Certifications for The Who by Numbers
Region	Certification	Certified units/sales
Canada (Music Canada)	Gold	50,000^{^}
United Kingdom (BPI)	Gold	100,000^{^}
United States (RIAA)	Platinum	1,000,000^{^}
^{^} Shipments figures based on certification alone.
