= Glitter 4 Your Soul =

Studio album by Rikki Rockett
- Released: January 7, 2003
- Recorded: 1999–2003
- Genre: Glam rock, punk rock, hard rock
- Length: 43:18
- Label: Slave To The Rhythm Productions, Inc

Rikki Rockett chronology
Glitter 4 Your Soul (2003)	Devil City Angels (2015)

Glitter 4 Your Soul is the debut studio album by Poison drummer Rikki Rockett, released in 2003 (and reissued in 2008). The record features former Poison band member Blues Saraceno on guitars also Poison front man Bret Michaels provides lead vocals for "Tear it Down" and Rikki Rockett himself sings his first lead vocal on "Life's a Gas".

The rest of the lead vocals are performed by Rikki's friends (other L.A musicians) such as Marc Minarik from Zenjin, Lucy Levinsohn from Evolove and Dick Swagger from The Hollywood Stones. The album is a tribute to 1970s glam rock.

== Track listing ==
1. "Action" (Sweet cover) (3:38)
2. "Fame" (David Bowie cover) (4:23)
3. "Do You Wanna Touch Me" (Gary Glitter cover) (3:24)
4. "Tear It Down" (Starz cover) (3:06)
5. "Elected" (Alice Cooper cover) (4:40)
6. "Trash" (New York Dolls cover) (2:48)
7. "All the Way from Memphis" (Mott The Hoople cover) (6:57)
8. "Rock On" (David Essex cover) (3:22)
9. "Can You Feel It" (Angel cover) (4:30)
10. "Life's a Gas" (T. Rex cover) (2:38)
11. "Star Star" (The Rolling Stones cover) (3:52)

== Personnel ==
- Rikki Rockett - Drums and percussion (Lead vocal on "Life's a Gas")
- Blues Saraceno - Guitar
- Chuck Garric - Bass

Guest musicians

- C.C. Deville - Additional backing vocals on "All the Way from Memphis"
- Christy Calabro - Guitars on "Can You Feel It"
- Stu Simone - Keyboards on "Can You Feel It" and "All the Way from Memphis"
- Jeremy Rubolino - Keyboards on "Elected" and "Life's a Gas"
- John Linn - Additional guitars on "Star Star"

Guest lead vocal performances

- Bret Michaels - "Tear It Down"
- Jizzy Pearl - "Can You Feel It"
- John Corabi - "Elected"
- Gina Schock - "Trash"
- Cliff Calabro - "Action" and "All the Way from Memphis"
- David Isaacs - "Fame"
- Lucy Levinsohn - "Do You Wanna Touch Me"
- Eleanor Academia - "Rock On"
- Dick Swagger - "Star Star"

Guest backing vocals

- Cliff Calabro
- Christy Calabro
- Mark Castrillon
- Jeremy Rubolino

== Production ==
- Produced by Rikki Rockett
- Co-produced and engineered by Cliff Calabro
- Mixed by Cliff Calabro
- Additional engineering and mixing: Rikki Rockett
- Recorded at The Hit Shed, Santa Clarita, California
