= Hairpick =

Studio album by Blues Saraceno
- Released: September 4, 1994
- Recorded: The Mastering Lab in Ojai, California
- Genre: Instrumental rock, hard rock
- Length: 33:53
- Label: Guitar Recordings
- Producer: Blues Saraceno, John Stix

Blues Saraceno chronology
Plaid (1992)	Hairpick (1994)	The Best of Blues Saraceno (2000)

Professional ratings
Review scores
Source	Rating
AllMusic	4/5 stars

Hairpick is the third studio album by guitarist Blues Saraceno, released on September 4, 1994 through Guitar Recordings. Following the recording of this album, Saraceno joined hard rock band, Poison.

== Track listing ==
All tracks are written by Blues Saraceno, except where noted.

No.	Title	Length
1.	"Stinky Kitty"	4:28
2.	"Rabbit Soup"	2:42
3.	"My Generation" (Pete Townshend)	3:11
4.	"King for a Day"	3:47
5.	"Pretty People"	3:09
6.	"Feedin' the Box"	3:23
7.	"Fat Padding"	3:14
8.	"Far from Home"	3:10
9.	"Chewing on Crayons"	3:09
10.	"Bouree" (Johann Sebastian Bach, arr. Ian Anderson)	3:40
Total length:		33:53

== Personnel ==
- Blues Saraceno – vocals, guitar, bass, engineering, mixing, production
- Dweezil Zappa – guitar (track 9)
- Josh Freese – drums
- Alex Saraceno – engineering, mixing
- Doug Sax – mastering
- John Stix – production
