= Crack a Smile... and More! =

Studio album by Poison
- Released: March 14, 2000
- Recorded: 1994–1995 at Devonshire Studios, Hollywood, California; 1988 Outtake; November 19, 1990 MTV Unplugged tracks
- Genre: Glam metal; hard rock; blues rock
- Length: 75:38
- Label: Capitol
- Producer: John Purdell & Duane Baron

Poison chronology
Poison's Greatest Hits: 1986–1996 (1996)	Crack a Smile... and More! (2000)	Power to the People (2000)

Singles from Crack a Smile... and More!
- 1. "Shut Up, Make Love" Released: January 2000; 2. "Be the One" Released: February 2000

Professional ratings
Review scores
Source	Rating
AllMusic	3/5 stars
Kerrang!	3/5 stars
Melody Maker	3/5 stars
Metal Hammer	8/10

Crack a Smile... and More! is the fifth studio album from the American hard rock band Poison. The record was released on March 14, 2000. The album features guitarist Blues Saraceno, who was hired as the band's new lead guitarist following the firing of Richie Kotzen in late 1993. Saraceno appeared on the band's last album release Poison's Greatest Hits: 1986–1996 in 1996, which featured two new tracks with him on lead guitar. Those two new tracks re-appear on this album along with thirteen new songs and five bonus tracks. The album moved around 12,000 copies in its first week of release to debut at #131 on the Billboard 200 album chart.

== Musical style ==
Crack a Smile, while replete with guitar performances comparable with those on Poison's previous studio record, Native Tongue, contains few traces of the seriousness of that record.

== Production and marketing ==
The life cycle of Crack a Smile, which began in 1994, was brought to an abrupt halt in May 1994, when vocalist Bret Michaels lost control of his Ferrari. Michaels suffered a broken nose, ribs, jaw and fingers, and lost four teeth.

After his recovery, the band continued recording in 1995. However, to the band's dismay, Capitol Records had by this time decided to put the album "on hold", and instead released a Greatest Hits record in 1996. It was not until March 14, 2000, that the record was finally released. The album's eventual release was prompted by strong fan demand, with promotional copies and bootlegs selling for $50 or more. In order to compete with the bootleg release, Capitol took the unusual step of throwing in additional bonus tracks to the album. The bootleg version of the album contained the original 12 album tracks, 6 songs from Poison's MTV Unplugged performance, and their cover of the Kiss classic "Rock and Roll All Nite." The final version of the album, titled Crack a Smile...and More!, contained the original 12 album tracks, two studio outtakes, one unnamed demo, "Face the Hangman" (previously released only as a B-side on European singles for "Every Rose Has Its Thorn"), and four of the songs from MTV Unplugged.

Saraceno was given considerable creative freedom and his writing and performing contributions dominated the album. The album's studio tracks were recorded at Devonshire Studios, Hollywood, California. Saraceno plays on these new songs (tracks 1–15), and original guitarist C.C. DeVille plays on the remaining bonus tracks, which are tracks recorded before this time. The songs "Sexual Thing" and "Lay Your Body Down" were first released on Poison's Greatest Hits: 1986–1996 as bonus new tracks.

== Songs ==
"Shut Up, Make Love", which is the first single presented to radio stations, is a raunchy party anthem. "Be the One" (second promo single) and "Lay Your Body Down" are classic power ballads. "Best Thing You Ever Had" brings harmonica and piano to the forefront, while guitarist Blues Saraceno lives up to his name on "Mr. Smiley" and "That's the Way I Like It." The band goes all-out punk on "Doin' as I Seen on My TV," returning to vintage Poison on "Sexual Thing," and "Baby Gets Around a Bit". It also delivers an inebriated version of Dr. Hook's "Cover of the Rolling Stone."

== Track listing ==
All tracks are written by Bret Michaels, Bobby Dall, Rikki Rockett, and Blues Saraceno, except where noted.

No.	Title	Writer(s)	Length
1.	"Best Thing You Ever Had"		4:19
2.	"Shut Up, Make Love"		3:52
3.	"Baby Gets Around a Bit"		3:37
4.	"Cover of the Rolling Stone" (Dr. Hook & The Medicine Show cover)	Shel Silverstein	3:09
5.	"Be the One"		5:39
6.	"Mr. Smiley"		2:43
7.	"Sexual Thing"		3:38
8.	"Lay Your Body Down"		5:28
9.	"No Ring, No Gets"		3:27
10.	"That's the Way I Like It"		3:40
11.	"Tragically Unhip"		2:54
12.	"Doin' as I Seen on My TV"		2:53
13.	"One More for the Bone" (Outtake track)		3:18
14.	"Set You Free" (Outtake track)		3:56
15.	"Crack a Smile" (Unfinished demo)		3:46
Total length:			75:38

Bonus tracks
No.	Title	Writer(s)	Length
16.	"Face the Hangman" (Outtake from Open Up and Say... Ahh!)	Michaels; Dall; Rockett; C.C. DeVille	3:21
17.	"Your Mama Don't Dance" (Live on MTV Unplugged; Loggins and Messina cover)	Kenny Loggins; Jim Messina	3:13
18.	"Every Rose Has Its Thorn" (Live on MTV Unplugged)	Michaels; Dall; Rockett; DeVille	4:38
19.	"Unskinny Bop" (Live on MTV Unplugged)	Michaels; Dall; Rockett; DeVille	4:02
20.	"Talk Dirty to Me" (Live on MTV Unplugged)	Michaels; Dall; Rockett; DeVille	4:06

== Personnel ==
- Bret Michaels – lead vocals, rhythm guitar, acoustic guitar, keyboards
- Rikki Rockett – drums, percussion
- Bobby Dall – bass, backing vocals
- Blues Saraceno – lead guitar, piano, backing vocals

=== Additional personnel ===
- C.C. DeVille – Acoustic Guitar (bonus tracks 16–20 - recorded earlier)
- Duane Baron – Producer, Engineer
- Kevin Flaherty – Producer, Liner Notes, Compilation
- Sam Gay – Art Direction
- Cindy Malig – Production Coordination
- Frank Micelotta – Photography
- John Purdell – Producer, Engineer
- Nitin Vadukul – Cover Photo
- Tom Werman – Producer
- Evren Göknar – Mastering Engineer

== Singles ==
- "Shut Up, Make Love"
- "Be the One"

== Charts ==
Chart (2000)	Peak position
US Billboard 200	131
