= Champions of Rock =

Compilation album by April Wine
- Released: November 21, 1996
- Genre: Rock, hard rock
- Length: 56:32
- Label: Disky
- Producer: Myles Goodwyn, Mike Stone, Nick Blagona, Lance Quinn

April Wine chronology
Frigate (1994)	Champions of Rock (1996)	Greatest Hits Live 1997 (1997)

Professional ratings
Review scores
Source	Rating
Allmusic	2.5/5 stars

Champions of Rock is a compilation album by the Canadian rock band April Wine, released in 1996 on Disky Records.

== Track listing ==
All tracks written by Myles Goodwyn unless otherwise noted.

1. "Just Between You and Me" – 3:54
2. "I Like to Rock" – 4:22
3. "Roller" – 4:15
4. "This Could be the Right One" – 4:15
5. "All Over Town" – 2:59
6. "Say Hello" – 2:59
7. "Tellin' Me Lies" – 2:59
8. "Big City Girls" – 3:40
9. "Caught in the Crossfire" – 3:34
10. "Crash and Burn" – 2:31
11. "One More Time" – 3:55
12. "Rock Myself to Sleep" (Kimberley Rew, Vince de la Cruz) – 3:12
13. "Bad Boys" – 3:08
14. "Money Talks" – 3:27
15. "Too Hot to Handle" – 5:05
16. "Wanna Rock" – 2:04

== Personnel ==
- Myles Goodwyn – vocals, guitar, keyboards
- Brian Greenway – guitar, vocals
- Gary Moffet – guitar, background vocals
- Steve Lang – bass, background vocals
- Jean Pellerin – bass (on "Rock Myself to Sleep")
- Jerry Mercer – drums & percussion, background vocals
- Marty Simon – drums (on "Rock Myself to Sleep")
- Daniel Barbe – keyboards (on "Rock Myself to Sleep")
