= Never Look Back (Blues Saraceno album) =

Studio album by Blues Saraceno
- Released: 1989
- Recorded: January 1989
- Studio: Millbrook Sound Studios, Millbrook, New York; Finger Sound Studios, Hartsdale, New York
- Genre: Instrumental rock
- Length: 30:37
- Label: Guitar Recordings
- Producer: Blues Saraceno, Paul Orofino, John Stix

Blues Saraceno chronology
Never Look Back (1989)	Plaid (1992)

Never Look Back is the first studio album by guitarist Blues Saraceno, released in 1989 through Guitar Recordings.

== Critical reception ==
Professional ratings
Review scores
Source	Rating
AllMusic	2.5/5 stars

Vincent Jeffries at AllMusic awarded Never Look Back 2.5 stars out of 5, calling it an impressive debut and praising Saraceno as "A much more mature player than his post-Vai and -Satriani competitors". The songs "Full Tank", "Before the Storm" and "Frazin'" were noted as highlights.

== Track listing ==
All music is composed by Blues Saraceno, except where noted.

No.	Title	Length
1.	"Remember When"	2:29
2.	"Never Look Back"	3:00
3.	"Full Tank"	2:48
4.	"Jay Walkin'"	3:09
5.	"Deliverance"	2:41
6.	"The Shakes"	3:36
7.	"Before the Storm"	4:35
8.	"Funk 49" (Dale Peters, Jim Fox, Joe Walsh)	3:34
9.	"Jitter Blast"	1:31
10.	"Frazin'"	3:14
Total length:		30:37

== Personnel ==
- Blues Saraceno – guitar, mixing, producer
- Joe Franco – drum
- Randy Coven – bass

Technical

- Paul Orofino – engineering, mixing, producer
- Carl Davino – engineering
- John Stix – mixing, producer
- George Marino – mastering
