= The Who by Numbers Tour =

1975–1976 concert tour by the Who

- Tour by The Who
- Tour poster
- Location: Europe; North America
- Associated album: The Who by Numbers
- Start date: 3 October 1975
- End date: 21 October 1976
- Legs: 8
- No. of shows: 47 in North America; 32 in Europe; 79 in total
- Attendance: 945,928
- Box office: $6.478 million ($36.65 million in 2025 dollars)

The Who concert chronology
- Quadrophenia Tour (1973–74); The Who by Numbers Tour (1975–76); The Who Tour 1979 (1979)

The Who by Numbers Tour was a concert tour by the English rock band the Who, in support of their seventh album, The Who by Numbers (1975). It began on 3 October 1975, ended on 21 October 1976 and consisted of 79 concerts split between North America and Europe. Despite being named after The Who by Numbers, few songs from the album were actually performed during the tour.

The tour began with a European leg, which introduced the band's first use of a laser lighting display, and was followed by a North American leg that set indoor concert attendance records. The Who returned to America again in 1976 after playing several more shows in Europe, including three back-to-back Christmas shows at the Hammersmith Odeon, London. The opening 1976 US show in Boston came to an end when drummer Keith Moon collapsed on stage after playing only two songs. The following day he seriously injured himself and nearly bled to death. After performing at British football stadiums in May and June of 1976, the Who returned again to North America for the final of leg of concerts. Following their show in Miami, Moon was hospitalised for over a week. His erratic behavior worried the other band members who believed he would not be able to finish the tour. While Moon did manage to complete the tour, the final shows became his last public concerts before dying of a drug overdose in 1978.

== Background ==
The Who by Numbers Tour started with 20 European dates in October and November 1975. The first concert took place at Bingley Hall in Stafford, England on 3 October 1975, the same day The Who by Numbers album was released. Prior to this, the Who had not performed live since playing four shows at Madison Square Garden in New York City the previous June, having spent much of 1974 working on the film adaptation of their rock opera Tommy and its soundtrack. A laser lighting display was introduced at the concerts at Leicester's Granby Halls shortly into the European leg, which would become a fixture of most of the tour's shows.

The tour continued with a North American leg in November and December 1975, starting on 20 November at The Summit in Houston, Texas. In North America, the band broke indoor concert attendance records for their 6 December concert at the Pontiac Metropolitan Stadium in Pontiac, Michigan, which attracted over 75,000 fans. Following the end of the North American leg, the band returned to the UK to play three Christmas concerts at the Hammersmith Odeon, London, due to high ticket demand for the earlier British dates.

Following four European dates in early 1976, the Who began a series of shows in the United States on 9 March at the Boston Garden. The tour had a disastrous start when Moon collapsed on stage just two songs into the Boston concert, causing the show to be postponed until 1 April. The day after the aborted concert, Moon kicked the glass out of a framed painting in his hotel room and seriously injured his heel in the process. He was discovered by manager Bill Curbishley, who took him to a hospital. Doctors told Curbishley that if he had not intervened, Moon would have bled to death. In his book Before I Get Old: The Story of the Who, music critic Dave Marsh suggested that at this point the Who's singer Roger Daltrey and bassist John Entwistle seriously considered firing Moon, but decided that doing so would make his life worse. The rest of the trip went without incident. In recognition of the band's performance at the Dane County Coliseum in Madison, Wisconsin, mayor Paul Soglin proclaimed 13 March 1976 "Who-Mania Day", the day of the concert. The band played the leg's only outdoor show on 21 March 1976 at Anaheim Stadium in Anaheim, California.

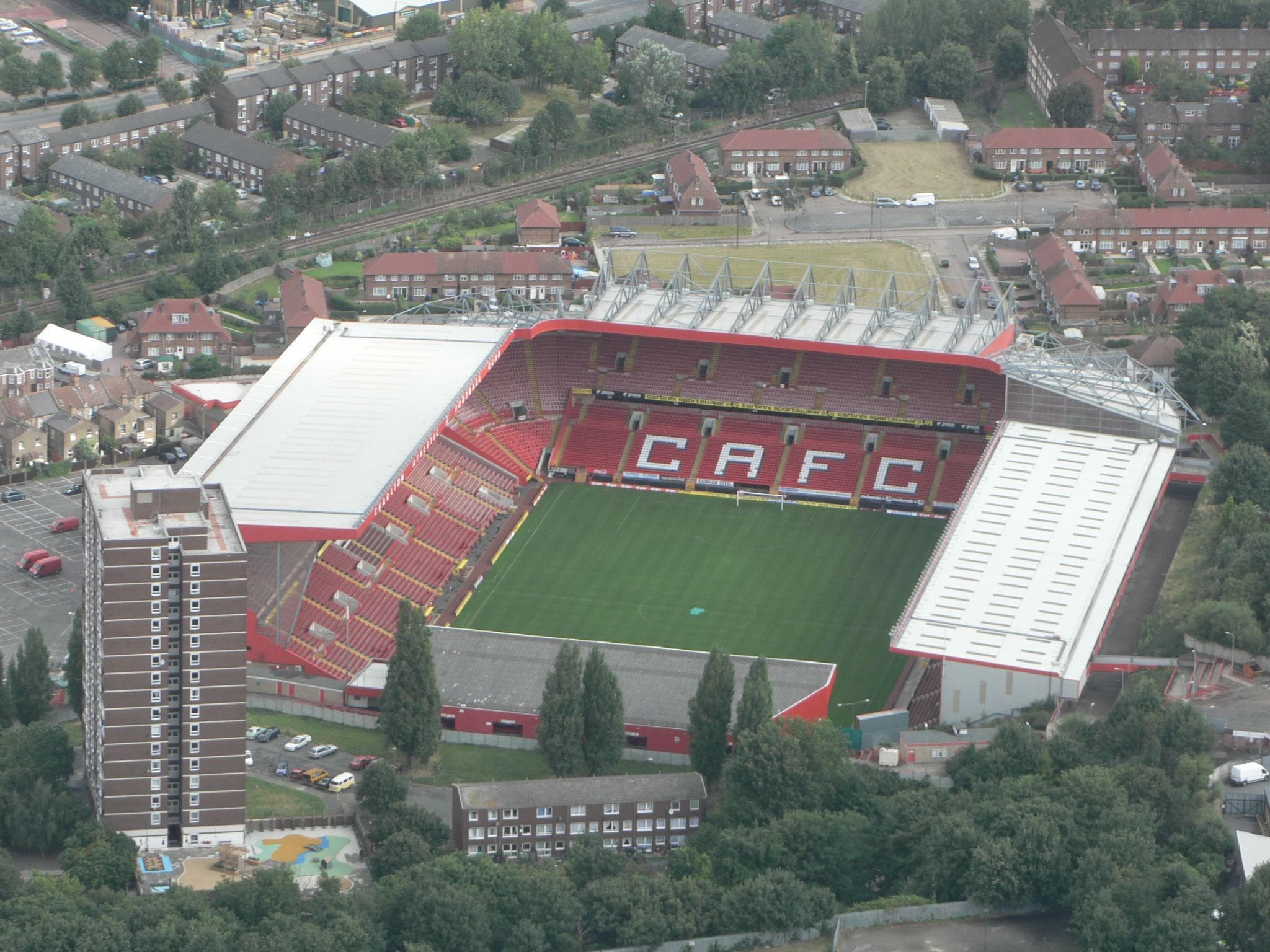
The Who's concert at The Valley in London was recognised by The Guinness Book of Records as the world's loudest concert.

The band continued The Who by Numbers Tour with "The Who Put the Boot In", a series of concerts in French arenas and British football stadiums, featuring a 60,000 capacity concert at The Valley in London. The show, which took place on 31 May 1976, was recognised by The Guinness Book of Records as the world's loudest concert, with the sound measuring 120 decibels. The band returned to the US in August to play four shows as a part of the "Whirlwind" leg. The leg was marred by a show in Jacksonville, Florida, which was 25,000 tickets short of a sellout. At the end of the "Whirlwind" tour in Miami, Moon was again hospitalised for eight days. Although the group were concerned that he would be unable to complete the last leg of the tour, which consisted of nine dates in the US and Canada throughout October 1976, Moon successfully played the shows, performing for the final time in public at Maple Leaf Gardens in Toronto on 21 October. Moon died less than two years later, on 7 September 1978. Bassist John Entwistle would go on to say that Moon and the Who reached their live performance peak during the tour.

== Reception ==
The tour was well received by critics. Billboard's Gerry Wood gave the band's 20 November 1975 show a very positive review, writing that "they were tight from the start and gave an energetic performance of their new songs and an amazingly fresh treatment to their older material." Jim Melanson, also from Billboard, lauded their concert on 11 March 1976 calling it "superb". Jim Healey of The Des Moines Register praised the band's performance on 2 December 1975, describing it as a show with class. Writing for The Plain Dealer, Jane Scott said in her write-up of the show on 9 December 1975 was "the most exhilarating and dramatic concert seen in this area." Derek Jewell was less favorable in his review for The Sunday Times, noting the lack of new songs the band performed and writing that "the Who are trapped playing ageing music for the ageing young."

== Set list ==
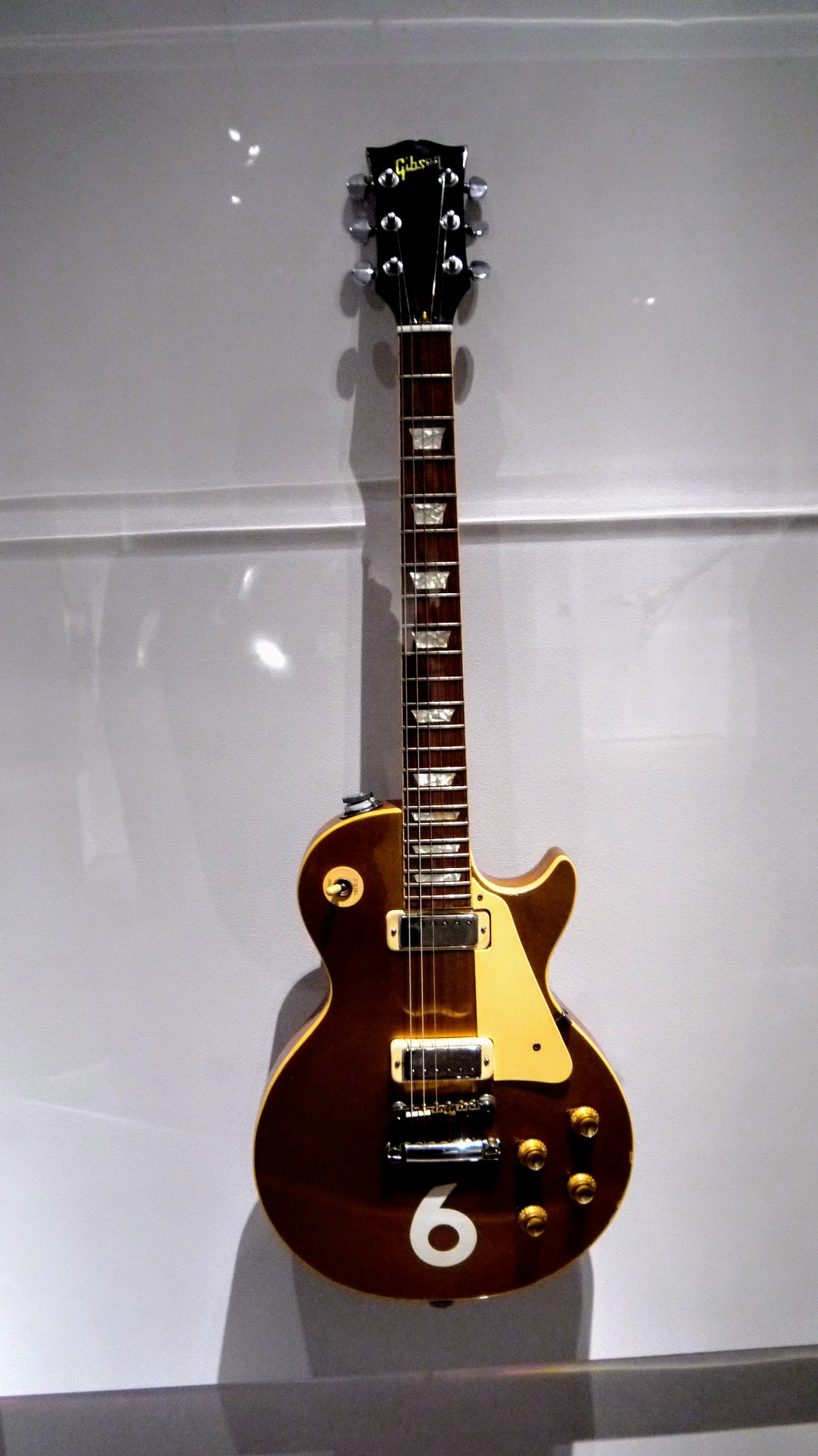
Townshend's "No. 6" Gibson Les Paul which broke during the 1975 tour

The Who's lineup during this tour consisted of Roger Daltrey (lead vocals, harmonica, tambourine), Pete Townshend (guitar, vocals), John Entwistle (bass guitar, vocals), and Keith Moon (drums, percussion, vocals). Biographers Andrew Neill and Matt Kent wrote in their book Anyway Anyhow Anywhere: The Complete Chronicle of The Who 1958–1978 that the tour had become a "greatest hits" celebration of the band's decade-long career by 1976. Despite ostensibly being a tour supporting the release of The Who by Numbers, few songs from the new album were performed live. Instead, the band opted to perform a mini-set of Tommy material in the middle of the set, thanks to the success of the film generating more interest in the rock opera. Meanwhile, less and less Quadrophenia material was performed compared to the Who's previous tour, with only "Drowned" occasionally finding its way into the set during early dates, before eventually being dropped.

Authors Joe McMichael and "Irish" Jack Lyons considers the following songs representative of the tour's set list. All songs written by Pete Townshend unless otherwise specified.

1. "I Can't Explain"
2. "Substitute"
3. "My Wife" (John Entwistle)
4. "Baba O'Riley"
5. "Squeeze Box"
6. "Behind Blue Eyes"
7. "Dreaming from the Waist"
8. "Boris the Spider" (Entwistle)
9. "Magic Bus”
10. Tommy suite:
  1. "Amazing Journey"
  2. "Sparks"
  3. "The Acid Queen"
  4. "Fiddle About" (Entwistle)
  5. "Pinball Wizard"
  6. "I'm Free"
  7. "Tommy's Holiday Camp"
  8. "We're Not Gonna Take It"
  9. "See Me, Feel Me"
11. "Summertime Blues" (Eddie Cochran, Jerry Capehart)
12. "My Generation"
13. "Join Together"
14. "My Generation Blues"
15. "Road Runner" (Ellas McDaniel)
16. "Won't Get Fooled Again"

== Films and albums ==
Over the years, one film has been released of the band's concert performances during The Who by Numbers Tour.

- The Who: Live in Texas '75 (Houston, 20 November 1975, released 2012)

Additionally, songs recorded during the tour have been released along with other live and/or studio material:

- The Kids Are Alright (soundtrack, 1979): "Join Together", "Road Runner", "My Generation Blues" (Pontiac, 6 December 1975)
- The Kids Are Alright (film, 1979): "Join Together", "Road Runner", "My Generation Blues" (Pontiac, 6 December 1975)
- Thirty Years of Maximum R&B (1994): "Dreaming from the Waist", "My Wife" (Swansea, 12 June 1976)
- Thirty Years of Maximum R&B Live (1994): "Dreaming from the Waist" (Richfield, 9 December 1975)
- The Who by Numbers (reissue 1996): "Squeeze Box", "Behind Blue Eyes", "Dreaming from the Waist" (Swansea, 12 June 1976)
- View from a Backstage Pass (2007): "Squeeze Box", "Dreaming from the Waist", "Fiddle About", "Pinball Wizard", "I'm Free", "Tommy's Holiday Camp", "We're Not Gonna Take It", "See Me, Feel Me" (Swansea, 12 June 1976)
- Greatest Hits Live (2010): "Pinball Wizard", "I'm Free", "Squeeze Box" (Swansea, 12 June 1976)
- Tommy (reissue, 2013): "I'm Free", "Tommy's Holiday Camp", "We're Not Gonna Take It", "See Me, Feel Me" (Swansea, 12 June 1976)
- The Who by Numbers (box set, 2026): “My Wife”, “Baba O’Riley”, “Squeeze Box”, “Behind Blue Eyes”, “Dreaming from the Waist”, “Amazing Journey”, “Sparks”, “The Acid Queen”, “Fiddle About”, “Pinball Wizard”, “I’m Free”, “Tommy’s Holiday Camp”, “We’re Not Gonna Take It/See Me, Feel Me”, “Summertime Blues”, “My Generation/Join Together/My Generation Blues”, “Won’t Get Fooled Again” (Swansea, 12 June 1976).

== Tour dates ==
European leg (3 October – 7 November 1975)
Date (1975)	City	Country	Venue	Attendance	Gross	Support act(s)	Ref(s)
3 October	Stafford	England	Bingley Hall	N/A	N/A	Steve Gibbons Band	
4 October	Stafford	England	Bingley Hall	N/A	N/A	Steve Gibbons Band	
6 October	Manchester	England	Kings Hall	N/A	N/A	Steve Gibbons Band	
7 October	Manchester	England	Kings Hall	N/A	N/A	Steve Gibbons Band	
15 October	Glasgow	Scotland	The Apollo	6,600 / 6,600	N/A	Steve Gibbons Band	
16 October	Glasgow	Scotland	The Apollo	6,600 / 6,600	N/A	Steve Gibbons Band	
18 October	Leicester	England	Granby Halls	N/A	N/A	Steve Gibbons Band	
19 October	Leicester	England	Granby Halls	N/A	N/A	Steve Gibbons Band	
21 October	London	England	Empire Pool	21,000 / 21,000	N/A	Steve Gibbons Band	
23 October	London	England	Empire Pool	21,000 / 21,000	N/A	Steve Gibbons Band	
24 October	London	England	Empire Pool	21,000 / 21,000	N/A	Steve Gibbons Band	
27 October	Rotterdam	Netherlands	Sportpaleis	N/A	N/A	Steve Gibbons Band	
28 October	Vienna	Austria	Wiener Stadthalle	N/A	N/A	Steve Gibbons Band	
29 October	Bremen	West Germany	Stadthalle Bremen	6,000	N/A	Steve Gibbons Band	
30 October	Düsseldorf	West Germany	Philips Halle	N/A	N/A	Steve Gibbons Band	
31 October	Düsseldorf	West Germany	Philips Halle	N/A	N/A	Steve Gibbons Band	
2 November	Sindelfingen	West Germany	Messehalle	N/A	N/A	Steve Gibbons Band	
3 November	Sindelfingen	West Germany	Messehalle	N/A	N/A	Steve Gibbons Band	
6 November	Ludwigshafen	West Germany	Friedrich-Ebert-Halle	N/A	N/A	Steve Gibbons Band	
7 November	Ludwigshafen	West Germany	Friedrich-Ebert-Halle	N/A	N/A	Steve Gibbons Band	

North America leg (20 November – 15 December 1975)
Date (1975)	City	Country	Venue	Attendance	Gross	Support act(s)	Ref(s)
20 November	Houston	United States	The Summit	18,000	$134,676	Toots and the Maytals	
21 November	Baton Rouge	United States	LSU Assembly Center	N/A	$112,630	Toots and the Maytals	
23 November	Memphis	United States	Mid-South Coliseum	10,882	$90,355	Toots and the Maytals	
24 November	Atlanta	United States	Omni Coliseum	18,376	$129,297	Toots and the Maytals	
25 November	Murfreesboro	United States	Monte Hale Arena	11,000	$92,000	Toots and the Maytals	
27 November	Hampton	United States	Hampton Roads Coliseum	11,906	$106,855	Toots and the Maytals	
28 November	Greensboro	United States	Greensboro Memorial Coliseum	17,437	$127,241	Toots and the Maytals	
30 November	Bloomington	United States	Assembly Hall	14,841	$108,357	Toots and the Maytals	
1 December	Kansas City	United States	Kemper Arena	13,414	$96,284	Toots and the Maytals	
2 December	Des Moines	United States	Veterans Memorial Auditorium	13,534	$97,747	Toots and the Maytals	
4 December	Chicago	United States	Chicago Stadium	37,479 / 37,479	$330,739	Toots and the Maytals	
5 December	Chicago	United States	Chicago Stadium	37,479 / 37,479	$330,739	Toots and the Maytals	
6 December	Pontiac	United States	Pontiac Metropolitan Stadium	75,000 / 75,000	$614,992	Toots and the Maytals	
8 December	Cincinnati	United States	Riverfront Coliseum	18,000	$138,500	Toots and the Maytals	
9 December	Cleveland	United States	Richfield Coliseum	19,000 / 19,000	$138,500	Toots and the Maytals	
10 December	Buffalo	United States	Buffalo Memorial Auditorium	11,700	$140,000	Toots and the Maytals	
11 December	Toronto	Canada	Maple Leaf Gardens	17,600	$157,879	Toots and the Maytals	
13 December	Providence	United States	Providence Civic Center	14,000	$112,324	Toots and the Maytals	
14 December	Springfield	United States	Springfield Civic Center	10,000	$84,000	Toots and the Maytals	
15 December	Philadelphia	United States	Spectrum	19,000 / 19,000	$146,000	Toots and the Maytals	

UK leg (21–23 December 1975)
Date (1975)	City	Country	Venue	Attendance	Gross	Support act(s)	Ref(s)
21 December	London	England	Hammersmith Odeon	N/A	N/A	Charlie	
22 December	London	England	Hammersmith Odeon	N/A	N/A	Charlie	
23 December	London	England	Hammersmith Odeon	N/A	N/A	Charlie	

European leg (27 February – 2 March 1976)
Date (1976)	City	Country	Venue	Attendance	Gross	Support act(s)	Ref(s)
27 February	Zürich	Switzerland	Hallenstadion	N/A	N/A	Steve Gibbons Band	
28 February	Munich	West Germany	Olympiahalle	N/A	N/A	Steve Gibbons Band	
1 March	Paris	France	Pavillon de Paris	N/A	N/A	Steve Gibbons Band	
2 March	Paris	France	Pavillon de Paris	N/A	N/A	Steve Gibbons Band	

US leg (9 March – 1 April 1976)
Date (1976)	City	Country	Venue	Attendance	Gross	Support act(s)	Ref(s)
9 March (Note: After playing two songs, Moon collapsed on stage and the show ended.)	Boston	United States	Boston Garden	N/A	N/A	Steve Gibbons Band	
11 March	New York City	United States	Madison Square Garden	19,500	$162,000	Steve Gibbons Band	
13 March	Madison	United States	Dane County Coliseum	10,100	$75,495	Steve Gibbons Band	
14 March	Saint Paul	United States	St. Paul Civic Center	17,600	$142,000	Steve Gibbons Band	
15 March	Oklahoma City	United States	Myriad Convention Center	14,801 / 14,801	$101,028	Steve Gibbons Band	
16 March	Fort Worth	United States	Tarrant County Convention Center	13,500	$100,583	Steve Gibbons Band	
18 March	Salt Lake City	United States	Salt Palace	N/A	$87,127	Steve Gibbons Band	
21 March	Anaheim	United States	Anaheim Stadium	55,000	$500,000	Rufus; Little Feat; Steve Gibbons Band	
24 March	Portland	United States	Memorial Coliseum	11,000 / 11,000	$93,000	Steve Gibbons Band	
25 March	Seattle	United States	Seattle Center Coliseum	15,000 / 15,000	$119,760	Steve Gibbons Band	
27 March	San Francisco	United States	Winterland Ballroom	10,800 / 10,800	$91,800	Steve Gibbons Band	
28 March	San Francisco	United States	Winterland Ballroom	10,800 / 10,800	$91,800	Steve Gibbons Band	
30 March	Denver	United States	McNichols Sports Arena	19,000	N/A	Steve Gibbons Band	
1 April	Boston	United States	Boston Garden	N/A	N/A	Steve Gibbons Band	

"The Who Put the Boot In" European leg (22 May – 12 June 1976)
Date (1976)	City	Country	Venue	Attendance	Gross	Support act(s)	Ref(s)
22 May	Colmar	France	Parc des Expositions	N/A	N/A	N/A	
25 May	Lyon	France	Palais des Sports de Gerland	N/A	N/A	N/A	
31 May	London	England	The Valley	60,000	N/A	Widowmaker; Outlaws; Streetwalkers; Little Feat; The Sensational Alex Harvey Band	
5 June	Glasgow	Scotland	Celtic Park	35,000	£140,000	Widowmaker; Outlaws; Streetwalkers; Little Feat; The Sensational Alex Harvey Band	
12 June	Swansea	Wales	Vetch Field	25,000	£100,000	Widowmaker; Outlaws; Streetwalkers; Little Feat; The Sensational Alex Harvey Band	

"Whirlwind" US leg (3 August – 9 August 1976)
Date (1976)	City	Country	Venue	Attendance	Gross	Support act(s)	Ref(s)
3 August	Landover	United States	Capital Centre	30,201 / 37,574	$259,655	Law	
4 August	Landover	United States	Capital Centre	30,201 / 37,574	$259,655	Law	
7 August	Jacksonville	United States	Gator Bowl Stadium	35,000 / 60,000	N/A	Law; Black Oak Arkansas; Labelle	
9 August	Miami	United States	Miami Stadium	17,000 / 17,200	$174,426	Law; Montrose; Outlaws	

North American leg (6–21 October 1976)
Date (1976)	City	Country	Venue	Attendance	Gross	Support act(s)	Ref(s)
6 October	Phoenix	United States	Arizona Veterans Memorial Coliseum	11,983	$94,719	Mother's Finest	
7 October	San Diego	United States	San Diego Sports Arena	13,842	$108,041	Mother's Finest	
9 October (Note: The concerts on 9–10 October 1976 were a part of Day on the Green.)	Oakland	United States	Oakland–Alameda County Coliseum	94,732 / 110,000	$1,042,520	Grateful Dead	
10 October	Oakland	United States	Oakland–Alameda County Coliseum	94,732 / 110,000	$1,042,520	Grateful Dead	
13 October	Portland	United States	Memorial Coliseum	11,000 / 11,000	$93,160	Mother's Finest	
14 October	Seattle	United States	Seattle Center Coliseum	15,000 / 15,000	$119,808	Mother's Finest	
16 October	Edmonton	Canada	Northlands Coliseum	16,000	N/A	Mother's Finest	
18 October	Winnipeg	Canada	Winnipeg Arena	N/A	N/A	Mother's Finest	
21 October	Toronto	Canada	Maple Leaf Gardens	20,000	N/A	Mother's Finest	

== See also ==
- List of The Who tours and performances
