= Hollyweird =

Studio album by Poison
- Released: May 21, 2002
- Recorded: April 2001 – April 2002
- Studios: Henson (Hollywood); Rock Central (Los Angeles)
- Genres: Glam metal; hard rock
- Length: 42:04
- Label: Cyanide Music
- Producer: Thom Panunzio

Poison chronology
Rock Champions (2001)	Hollyweird (2002)	Best of Ballads & Blues (2003)

Singles from Hollyweird
- 1. "Rockstar" Released: May 27, 2001; 2. "Squeeze Box" Released: March 4, 2002; 3. "Shooting Star" Released: November 5, 2002

Professional ratings
Review scores
Source	Rating
411Mania	(4/10)
AllMusic	3.5/5 stars
antiMusic	2/5 stars
KNAC	5/5 stars

Hollyweird is the sixth studio album by American glam metal band Poison, released through Cyanide Music on May 21, 2002. It debuted at No. 103 on the Billboard 200 chart and No. 8 on the Independent Albums chart and sold 11,000 copies in its first week. It is their last album of original material due to their following album Poison'd! (2007) consisting entirely of covers.

== Musical style ==
The record brought together Poison's original lineup for the first full studio project since Flesh & Blood. The result was a combination of old and new sounds, with guitarist C.C. DeVille frequently preferring pop and punk rock sounds to the heavy metal style that had characterized Poison's previous records. The band's new style was particularly evident in the songs "Emperor's New Clothes", "Livin' In the Now" and "Home (C.C's Story)", which featured DeVille on lead vocals.

== Production and marketing ==
In the face of major label offers that would have required the band to re-record old material, the band decided to release the album through their own label, Cyanide Music. Hollyweird was recorded at Henson Recording Studios in Hollywood, California and Rock Central Studios in Sherman Oaks, California with producer Thom Panunzio and engineer Bob Koszela.

== Songs ==
The album's themes revolve almost exclusively around the trials and tribulations of success in Hollywood, California—a theme that had previously been explored in the band's single "Fallen Angel" from their second album Open Up and Say... Ahh!.

The first single released from the album was "Rockstar", which was released on the web as a preview for the album; the second single was a cover of The Who song "Squeeze Box".

Bobby Dall on The Who cover "Squeeze Box":

...Actually, that was Rikki's idea. When we came into rehearsals ... to break the ice for the new record ... before we started fightin' and arguin' about songs, we went through a list of covers and remakes. ...It was the song that stuck and I think it fits perfectly for our band. It has a great melody and a great vocal, but it's also kinda sparse and undefined ... it was kinda like an open pallet [sic.] for us.

"Shooting Star" was also released as a single for the album and was referred to as part 2 to the Fallen Angel single from Open Up and...Say Ahh.

== Track listing ==
All tracks are written by Bret Michaels, Bobby Dall, Rikki Rockett, and C.C. DeVille, except where noted.

No.	Title	Writer(s)	Length
1.	"Hollyweird"		3:15
2.	"Squeeze Box" (The Who cover)	Pete Townshend	2:32
3.	"Shooting Star"		4:39
4.	"Wishful Thinkin'"		2:49
5.	"Get 'Ya Some"		4:22
6.	"Emperor's New Clothes"		2:15
7.	"Devil Woman"		3:47
8.	"Wasteland"		3:56
9.	"Livin' in the Now"		2:37
10.	"Stupid, Stoned & Dumb"		3:10
11.	"Home" (Bret's Story)		2:49
12.	"Home" (C.C.'s Story)		2:47
13.	"Rockstar"		3:33
Total length:			42:04

== Personnel ==
=== Poison ===
- Bret Michaels – lead vocals
- C.C. DeVille – lead guitar, backing vocals, lead vocals (tracks 6, 9 & 12)
- Bobby Dall – bass, backing vocals
- Rikki Rockett – drums, backing vocals

=== Additional musicians ===
- Danny Wagner – keyboards
- Mark "Small Face" Poole – backing vocals
- Christy Calabro – backing vocals
- Cliff Calabro – backing vocals

== Singles ==
- "Rockstar" – May 27, 2001
- "Squeeze Box" – March 4, 2002
- "Shooting Star" – November 5, 2002

== Charts ==
Chart (2002)	Peak position
US Billboard 200	103
US Independent Albums (Billboard)	8
