= Until You Suffer Some =

1993 single by Poison

"Until You Suffer Some (Fire and Ice)"

Single by Poison

from the album Native Tongue
- B-side: "Bastard Son of a Thousand Blues"
- Released: April 12, 1993
- Genre: Blues rock; hard rock
- Length: 4:16
- Label: Capitol
- Songwriters: Bret Michaels; Bobby Dall; Rikki Rockett; Richie Kotzen
- Producer: Richie Zito

Poison singles chronology
"Stand" (1993)	"Until You Suffer Some (Fire and Ice)" (1993)	"Body Talk" (1993)

Music videos
- "Until You Suffer Some (Fire and Ice)" on YouTube

"Until You Suffer Some (Fire and Ice)" is a song by American hard rock band Poison. It was released as the second single from their 1993 album, Native Tongue. The song peaked at number 32 on the UK Singles Chart.

== Background ==
The single features a remix version called the "Ice Mix" as a B-side track. The song also features a music video which has the band performing the song in a bar.

== Track listings ==
7-inch single, CC single

1. "Until You Suffer Some (Fire and Ice)"
2. "Bastard Son of a Thousand Blues"

12-inch single

1. "Until You Suffer Some (Fire and Ice)" - 4:14
2. "Strike Up The Band" - 4:15
3. "Stand" (acoustic mix) - 4:12
4. "Until You Suffer Some (Fire and Ice)" (Ice Mix) - 4:12

CD single

1. "Until You Suffer Some (Fire and Ice)" – 4:14
2. "Stand" (acoustic mix) – 4:12
3. "Bastard Son of a Thousand Blues" – 4:56
4. "Until You Suffer Some (Fire and Ice)" (Ice mix) – 4:12

== Charts ==
Chart (1993)	Peak position
Australia (ARIA)	104
UK Singles (OCC)	32
US Bubbling Under Hot 100 (Billboard)	4
