= Look What the Cat Dragged In =

Studio album by Poison
- Released: May 23, 1986
- Recorded: 1986
- Studios: Music Grinder Studios, Hollywood
- Genres: Glam metal; hard rock
- Length: 33:24
- Labels: Enigma; Capitol
- Producer: Ric Browde

Poison chronology
Look What the Cat Dragged In (1986)	Open Up and Say... Ahh! (1988)

Singles from Look What the Cat Dragged In
- 1. "Cry Tough" Released: August 5, 1986; 2. "Talk Dirty to Me" Released: February 18, 1987; 3. "I Want Action" Released: May 20, 1987; 4. "I Won't Forget You" Released: August 5, 1987

Professional ratings
Review scores
Source	Rating
AllMusic	4/5 stars
Rock Hard	3/10
PopMatters	3

Look What the Cat Dragged In is the debut studio album by American glam metal band Poison, released on May 23, 1986, by Enigma Records and Capitol Records. Though not a success at first, it steadily built momentum and peaked at #3 on the US Billboard 200 on May 23, 1987. The album spawned three successful singles: "Talk Dirty to Me", "I Want Action", and "I Won't Forget You".

Look What the Cat Dragged In was certified Gold in 1987 and 3× Platinum in 1990 by the Recording Industry Association of America (RIAA). It has also been certified silver by the British Phonographic Industry (BPI), and platinum in Canada.

== Production and marketing ==
The record was described by vocalist Bret Michaels as a "glorified demo". It was recorded in twelve days at Los Angeles' Music Grinder Studios with producer Ric Browde, for a cost of US$23,000, part of which was funded from the pockets of the band members and their families.

== Background ==
It originally included only one single, "Cry Tough"; however, Look What the Cat Dragged In became a surprise success and subsequently spawned three more charting hits: "Talk Dirty to Me", "I Want Action", and "I Won't Forget You", The record became the biggest-selling-album in Enigma's history. With heavy rotation on MTV, their debut earned the band tours with fellow glam rockers Ratt, Cinderella, and Quiet Riot, as well as a coveted slot in the Texxas Jam in Dallas. The album ultimately sold 4 million copies worldwide.

== Reissues ==
In 2006, a 20th Anniversary edition was released by Capitol; this version added single versions of two of the album's tracks and a cover of Jim Croce's "You Don't Mess Around with Jim" as bonus tracks.

== Track listing ==
All tracks are written by Bret Michaels, C.C. DeVille, Bobby Dall and Rikki Rockett, except where noted.

No.	Title	Length
1.	"Cry Tough"	3:36
2.	"I Want Action"	3:05
3.	"I Won't Forget You"	3:35
4.	"Play Dirty"	4:08
5.	"Look What the Cat Dragged In"	3:10
6.	"Talk Dirty to Me"	3:44
7.	"Want Some, Need Some"	3:39
8.	"Blame It on You"	2:32
9.	"#1 Bad Boy"	3:14
10.	"Let Me Go to the Show"	2:45
Total length:		33:28

2006 remastered edition bonus tracks:
No.	Title	Length
11.	"I Want Action" (single version)	3:06
12.	"I Won't Forget You" (single version)	3:39
13.	"You Don't Mess Around with Jim" (demo; Jim Croce cover)	3:05
Total length:		43:32

== Personnel ==
- Bret Michaels – lead vocals, rhythm guitar
- C.C. DeVille – lead guitar, backing vocals
- Bobby Dall – bass, backing vocals
- Rikki Rockett – drums, backing vocals

=== Additional personnel ===
- Ric Browde – arrangement, production
- Jim Faraci – engineering, production
- Michael Wagener – mixing
- Evren Göknar – 2006 remastering

== Charts ==
Chart (1986–1987)	Peak position
Australian Albums (Kent Music Report)	51
Canada Top Albums/CDs (RPM)	14
US Billboard 200	3

== Certifications ==
Region	Certification	Certified units/sales
Canada (Music Canada)	Platinum	100,000^{^}
United Kingdom (BPI)	Silver	60,000^{^}
United States (RIAA)	3× Platinum	3,000,000^{^}
^{^} Shipments figures based on certification alone.

== Accolades ==
Publication	Year	Country	Accolade	Rank
Revolver Magazine	2014	US	6 Glam-Metal Albums You Need To Own	N/A
PopMatters	2021	US	10 Essential Glam Metal Albums	N/A
Rolling Stone	2019	US	50 Greatest Hair Metal Albums of All Time	2
L.A. Weekly	2011	US	Chuck Klosterman's Favorite Hair Metal Albums	7
Louder Sound	2021	US	The 10 best glam metal albums	N/A
L.A. Weekly	2011	US	Top 20 Hair Metal Albums of All Time	6
Guitar World	2008	US	Top 20 Hair Metal Albums of the Eighties	N/A
Ultimate Classic Rock	2021	US	Top 30 Glam Metal Albums	16
Loudwire	2016	US	Top 30 Hair Metal Albums	10
Metal Rules	2003	US	Top 50 Glam Metal Albums	4
Loudwire	2016	US	Top 80 Hard Rock + Metal Albums of the 1980s	80
