= Blue, Red and Grey =

Song by the Who

from the album The Who by Numbers
- Released: October 3, 1975
- Recorded: April – 12 June 1975
- Genre: Folk rock
- Length: 2:47
- Label: Polydor; MCA
- Songwriter: Pete Townshend
- Producer: Glyn Johns

"Blue, Red and Grey" is the eighth song on the Who's seventh studio album The Who by Numbers (1975). An acoustic ballad featuring the song's writer, Pete Townshend, on lead vocals, the song is generally considered one of the lighter songs on the album.

== Background ==
"Blue, Red and Grey" is sung by Pete Townshend, with the only instrumentation being Townshend on ukulele and John Entwistle playing horns. A group version of the song was recorded, but the recording was apparently lost.

[It] was a ukulele ditty with John Entwistle adding brass band to the misty middle distance. It was about nothing at all; it reminded me of an old Smiley Smile Beach Boys number.

— Pete Townshend

Although Roger Daltrey, who was absent on the final track, claimed that the song was one of his favorites off the album, Townshend disliked the song and did not want it to be released. However, producer Glyn Johns successfully pushed for its inclusion on The Who by Numbers.

Glyn Johns wanted it on the album. I cringed when he picked it. He heard it on a cassette and said, 'What's that?' I said, 'Nothing.' He said, 'No. Play it.' I said, 'Really, it's nothing. Just me playing a ukulele.' But he insisted on doing it. I said, 'What? That fucking thing? Here's me wanting to commit suicide and you're going to put that thing on the record?'

— Pete Townshend

The song cross-fades with "They Are All In Love" in the 1996 remaster of the album, but in the original version, it did not.

== Lyrics ==
In contrast to many songs on The Who by Numbers, "Blue, Red and Grey" features mostly positive lyrics, with the phrase "I like every minute of the day" being repeated throughout the song.

== Reception ==
Rolling Stone named the song as the 17th best song by the Who, stating, "'Blue, Red and Grey' was a moment of optimism amid the darkness, a simple, oddly beautiful ode to enjoying life that was written on the ukulele and recorded on a home demo". Stephen Thomas Erlewine of AllMusic praised the song's "grace", while Robert Christgau of The Village Voice named the song as one of the two on the album that "break out of the bind".
