= Blues Saraceno =

American musician

- Born: October 17, 1971 (age 55); Hartford, Connecticut, U.S.
- Genres: Heavy metal; hard rock
- Occupations: Musician; composer; producer
- Instruments: Guitar; bass guitar; keyboards; piano; vocals
- Years active: 1989–present
- Formerly of: Poison; Kingdom Come
- Website: bluessaraceno.com

Blues Saraceno (born October 17, 1971) is an American rock guitarist, composer and music producer, currently residing in Los Angeles, California. He was discovered by Guitar for the Practicing Musician magazine at the age of 16, which assisted him in releasing instrumental recordings on an independent basis.

Saraceno's profile as a guitar virtuoso and musician opened the doors to an early career as a first-call guitar sideman and session musician. He is most often recognized for his time playing with Jack Bruce and Ginger Baker (Cream) as well as his brief tenure with the rock band Poison. Saraceno's early success in the music industry would eventually blossom into a career in producing and composing for television and film.

== Early life and career ==
Blues Saraceno was born to musician parents, who introduced him at an early age to several musical instruments. He started to play guitar at the age of nine. When he was thirteen, he broke his elbow when he fell from a go-kart and asked the doctor to position the cast in a way that allowed him to remove it from his sling to practice guitar during his recovery. When he was nineteen, Saraceno moved to Los Angeles to seek a career in music.

== Career ==
When Saraceno was still a teenager, his manager sent a demo tape to singer Michael Bolton, who decided to enlist him to play on a song for Cher's album, Heart of Stone. The album also featured musicians like Peter Cetera, Bonnie Tyler, Desmond Child, and others. His demo tape then reached the Guitar for the Practicing Musician magazine. The magazine, which was about to launch a new record label, offered Saraceno a record deal. Saraceno released his first album titled Never Look Back in 1989.

Saraceno won an audition with Jack Bruce and Ginger Baker, former members of Cream, and started touring with them. After two successful US tours, Saraceno was sometimes referred to as the "kid that replaced Eric Clapton". After another year of overseas touring, Baker departed and was replaced by Simon Phillips (The Who, Toto) and eventually Gary Husband (Level 42). Saraceno released two other solo albums (Plaid and Hairpick) as well as furthering his reputation as a top call session guitarist and landing many high-profile equipment endorsements.

In 1993, Saraceno joined the band Poison as lead guitarist and songwriter after Richie Kotzen was fired. After a South American tour which included the famous Hollywood rock festival in Brazil, Saraceno recorded the album Crack a Smile with the band. However, Capitol Records decided to shelve the album, releasing the 1996 compilation album, Poison's Greatest Hits: 1986–1996, instead. Still, the album featured two of the new songs recorded with Saraceno.

After some time, Saraceno left the group amicably and was replaced by one of the band's former guitarist, C.C. DeVille. In 2000, Capitol finally decided to release the Crack a Smile album under the name Crack a Smile... and More!. The album features fifteen tracks recorded by Saraceno.

After his departure from Poison, Saraceno met the vice-president of Advertising of Fox Television, who was a fan of Saraceno's earlier instrumental work. This resulted in Saraceno working on soundtracks and songs for several television shows and films.

In 2000, Saraceno founded the band, Transmission OK. Saraceno also worked as record producer for the band, which was signed to Beyond Music, and was distributed by BMG. After a brief US tour, and lackluster support from the label, the group disbanded and Saraceno continued to work on television and film, as well as his session work.

Saraceno's has done session work with Ziggy Marley (Dragonfly), Melissa Etheridge (Lucky), earning him a reputation for being a "go-to guy" for many of Los Angeles' top record producers and engineers.

Saraceno has also produced for artists including Scott Caan (Hawaii Five-0, Oceans 11), Eric Balfour (24, Haven, Chainsaw Massacre) of Fredalba, Lindsay Price (Beverly Hills 90210, Lipstick Jungle) and Anthony Michael Hall (Dead Zone).

Saraceno's greatest success has come in the field of television and film. His television work credits include WWE, CBS, NBC, ABC, FOX, Disney, Discovery, UPN, MTV, MTV 2, VH1, USA, TLC, Comedy Central, Telemundo, SCI FI, SPIKE, E! and BRAVO. A more detailed list can be found on his website (www.bluessaraceno.com). He has commented on how it is not uncommon to have several commercials running in different countries throughout the world, all at the same time, using the same piece of music.

Saraceno did three tracks for Megas XLR. These tracks were Blood Shot, Berzerker and Ro-Sham-Bo.

Saraceno's "Save My Soul" is the soundtrack for the History Channel's mini-series The Men Who Built America.

Saraceno's "Evil Ways" song was also used in various videogames trailers such as God of War: Ascension, Call of Juarez: Gunslinger, BioShock Infinite and Call of Duty: Black Ops II's zombies mode map, Mob of the Dead and was also included in the soundtrack for a videogame Rebel Galaxy. In addition, the song was also utilized to promote AMC's 2013 Fear Fest and is also used as the main theme music in the History Channel's TV series, Biker Battleground Phoenix.

TNA wrestler AJ Styles began using "Evil Ways" at TNA's Slammiversary pay-per-view on June 2, 2013, as his new theme song. It was also used in a WWE promo featuring The Undertaker vs. CM Punk WrestleMania XXIX match and another promo featuring The Wyatt Family in an episode of WWE SmackDown.

It was also used during a promo for Kane, Ryback and Big Show vs. The Wyatt Family at WWE's Fastlane 2016 pay-per-view. German TV-Channel ProSieben and sister-channel ProSieben Maxx are using the song for almost every promo-clip for upcoming western-movies in their program. "Flesh It Out" was used as WWE rookie Seth Rollins' theme tune for the first year of his career on FCW and NXT. "Strident Missile" was used for Triple H's history of dominance promo for WrestleMania XXX. An instrumental version of the dubstep remix of "The River" was used for Emma's video packages leading up to her return at the post-Wrestlemania RAW in 2017. WWE also used his single "Bad Man" for Jeff Jarrett's Hall of Fame video.

== Discography ==
=== Solo ===
Studio albums

- Never Look Back (1989)
- Plaid (1992)
- Hairpick (1994)

EPs

- Wicked Gonna Come (2018)
- The Devil You Know (2018)

=== Cher ===
- Heart of Stone (1989) - additional guitar on track 7

=== Taylor Dayne ===
- Can't Fight Fate (1989) - lead guitar on track 5

=== Kingdom Come ===
- Hands of Time (1991) - guitar solos on tracks 3, 9 and 10

=== Poison ===
- Crack a Smile... and More! (2000) (original promotional release date was April 22, 1996)

=== Gorgeous George ===
- Gorgeous George (1999)

=== Transmission OK ===
- The Sky, the Stars and the Great Beyond... (2000)

=== Ziggy Marley ===
- Dragonfly (2003)

=== Megas XLR ===
- Megas XLR OST (2004)

=== Melissa Etheridge ===
- Lucky (2004)

=== The Infinite Staircase ===
- The Road Less Taken (2009)

=== Lita Ford ===
- Time Capsule (2016)

=== The Biggest Band In The World ===
- Fight of Your Life (2018)

=== Nine One One ===
- Wicked Gonna Come (2018)

=== Guest appearances ===
- Return of the Worm, Todd Grubbs, (2011), Grubworm Music
- Double Talkin' Jive – A Hard Rock Tribute to Guns N' Roses, (2008), Versailles
- Liquid Piece of Me, Sergio "SERJ" Buss, (2007)
- Too Fast for Love: A Millennium Tribute to Mötley Crüe, (2007), Versailles
- Studs n' Sisters, Chris Francis, (2006), Up to Speed Music
- Go with What You Know, Dweezil Zappa, (2006), Zappa Records
- The Frank Zappa AAAFNRAA Birthday Bundle, Frank Zappa (2006), Zappa Records
- Just Like Paradise: A Millennium Tribute to Diamond David Lee Roth, (2005), Versailles
- Cover 2 cover, Jeff Scott Soto, (2005)
- My World, Kang Ino, (2005), Dream On
- Glitter 4 Your Soul, Rikki Rockett, (2003), Slave to the Rhythm Productions Inc.
- A Tribute to Aerosmith – Let the Tribute Do the Talkin', (2002), Mascot
- Tribute to Van Halen (2000), Triage Records
- Automatic, Dweezil Zappa, (2000), Favored Nations
- Aerosmith Tribute: Not the Same Old Song & Dance, (1999), Cleopatra
- Guitar's Practicing Musicians Vol 111, (1994), Guitar Recordings
- Guitar's Practicing Musicians, (1993), Guitar Recordings
- Sammy Says Ouch!, Randy Coven, (1990), Guitar Recordings
- Truth in Unity, Chris Catena's Rock City Tribe, (2020), Grooveyard Records

=== Sampled songs ===
- "Save My Soul", (2012) used by History Channel for the miniseries docudrama The Men Who Built America
- "Moonshine and Gasoline", (2013) used by Discovery Channel for the television show Moonshiners
- "We Are Young", (2017) used by Mercedes-Benz as soundtrack for the Class X Pickup advertising spot over Internet
- "The River", (2024) used by Netflix in the trailer for the true crime docuseries Don't F**k with Cats: Hunting an Internet Killer
