= Cry Tough (song) =

Single by Poison

from the album Look What the Cat Dragged In
- B-side: "Look What the Cat Dragged In"
- Released: August 5, 1986
- Recorded: 1986
- Genre: Glam metal
- Length: 3:38
- Label: Enigma/Capitol Records
- Songwriters: Bret Michaels; Bobby Dall; Rikki Rockett; C.C. DeVille
- Producer: Ric Browde

Poison singles chronology
"Cry Tough" (1986)	"Talk Dirty to Me" (1987)

Music videos
- "Cry Tough" on YouTube

"Cry Tough" is the debut single by the American glam metal band Poison. It was featured on the group's first album Look What the Cat Dragged In.

== Background ==
"Cry Tough" was released as a single in 1986 on Capitol Records' Enigma label. It is about believing in yourself to make your dreams come true.

The B-side is the title track "Look What The Cat Dragged In".

The song failed to chart in the US but charted at number 97 on the UK Singles Chart.

== Critical reception ==
Upon the single release John Aizlewood left warm review for Number One on 29 August 1986. He considered that "Poison put the groove in groovy", song has "an impossible sound to ignore" and "it would be nice to see them chartbound".

== Music video ==
The song's video was placed on New York Times list of the 15 Essential Hair-Metal Videos.

== Charts ==
Chart (1987)	Peak position
UK Singles (OCC)	97
