= I Won't Forget You =

Single by Poison

from the album Look What the Cat Dragged In
- B-side: "Blame It on You"
- Released: August 5, 1987
- Recorded: 1986
- Genre: Glam metal; blues rock
- Length: 3:38
- Label: Enigma; Capitol
- Songwriters: Bret Michaels; Bobby Dall; Rikki Rockett; C.C. DeVille
- Producer: Ric Browde

Poison singles chronology
"I Want Action" (1987)	"I Won't Forget You" (1987)	"Rock and Roll All Nite" (1987)

Music videos
- "I Won't Forget You" on YouTube

"I Won't Forget You" is a power ballad by the American glam metal band Poison, originally from the album Look What the Cat Dragged In.

Released as a single in 1987 on the Enigma label of Capitol Records, the song peaked at number 13 on the Billboard Hot 100 in The US, and is considered one of Poison's best songs.

== Background ==
The song, along with "Talk Dirty to Me", "Fallen Angel" and "Ride the Wind", was the subject of a lawsuit in 2011 by members of the defunct band Kid Rocker, who claimed that the songs were based on Kid Rocker songs played to the Poison guitarist C.C. DeVille before he was a member of Poison.

The live, daytime concert footage for the official music video for "I Won't Forget You" was recorded at the 1987 Texxas Jam in Dallas, Texas. Nighttime concert footage was filmed at the Cumberland County Civic Center in Portland, Maine. Despite the song's success, it was dropped from the band's live shows in 1988 and did not return to the setlist until 2003, as noted by the vocalist Bret Michaels that year when the band was about to play the song.

== Reception ==
"I Won't Forget You" is widely regarded as one of Poison's best songs. In 2017, Billboard and OC Weekly ranked the song number eight and number six, respectively, on their lists of the 10 greatest Poison songs.

== Personnel ==
- Bret Michaels - Lead Vocals, Acoustic Guitar, Backing Vocals
- C.C. DeVille - Lead Guitar, Rhythm Guitar (Used in the choruses and sporadically in the verses), Backing Vocals
- Bobby Dall - Bass, Backing Vocals
- Rikki Rockett - Drums, Backing Vocals

== Charts ==
Chart (1987)	Peak position
Canada Top Singles (RPM)	38
New Zealand (Recorded Music NZ)	37
US Billboard Hot 100	13
