= Stand (Poison song) =

1993 single by Poison

Single by Poison

from the album Native Tongue
- B-side: "Native Tongue/Scream"; "Whip Comes Down"
- Released: January 4, 1993
- Genre: Hard rock, blues rock, gospel
- Length: 5:15
- Label: Capitol
- Songwriters: Richie Kotzen; Bobby Dall; Bret Michaels; Rikki Rockett
- Producer: Richie Zito

Poison singles chronology
"So Tell Me Why" (1991)	"Stand" (1993)	"Until You Suffer Some (Fire and Ice)" (1993)

Music video
- "Stand" on YouTube

"Stand" is a song by American band Poison, written by Richie Kotzen prior to joining the band. It was the first single from their fourth album, Native Tongue (1993), released in January 1993, by Capitol Records. The song reached number 15 on the US Billboard Album Rock Tracks chart, number 35 on the Billboard Top 40 Mainstream chart, and number 50 on the Billboard Hot 100. The song also charted at number 25 on the UK Singles Chart and number 15 in Canada.

== Background ==
The album version of "Stand" includes the Los Angeles First A.M.E. Church choir on backing vocals. The single's B-side, "Whip Comes Down", has not been included on any Poison album to date. An acoustic version of the song appears as a bonus track on the Japanese release of Richie Kotzen's Acoustic Cuts. It features the original lyrics, which include an additional verse.

== Charts ==
Weekly chart performance for "Stand"
Chart (1993)	Peak position
Australia (ARIA)	80
Canada Top Singles (RPM)	15
Europe (European Hit Radio)	24
Switzerland (Schweizer Hitparade)	39
UK Singles (Official Charts)	25
UK Airplay (Music Week)	24
US Billboard Hot 100	50
US Mainstream Rock (Billboard)	15
US Pop Airplay (Billboard)	35

== Release history ==
Release dates and formats for "Stand"
Region	Date	Format(s)	Label(s)	Ref.
United States	January 4, 1993	CD; cassette	Capitol	
United Kingdom	February 1, 1993	7-inch vinyl; CD; cassette	Capitol	
