= Native Tongue (Poison album) =

Studio album by Poison
- Released: February 8, 1993
- Recorded: 1992
- Studios: A&M (Hollywood); Rumbo (Los Angeles)
- Genres: Hard rock; blues rock; glam metal
- Length: 56:20
- Label: Capitol
- Producer: Richie Zito

Poison chronology
Swallow This Live (1991)	Native Tongue (1993)	Poison's Greatest Hits: 1986–1996 (1996)

Singles from Native Tongue
- 1. "Stand" Released: January 4, 1993; 2. "Until You Suffer Some" Released: April 12, 1993; 3. "Body Talk" Released: 1993; 4. "7 Days Over You" Released: 1993

Native Tongue is the fourth studio album by American glam metal band Poison, released in 1993 through Capitol Records. It peaked at #16 on the Billboard 200, #20 on the UK Albums Chart and was certified gold by the RIAA on April 21, 1993. It has also been certified platinum in Canada. This is the only album to feature lead guitarist Richie Kotzen. Kotzen was hired as the band's guitarist following the firing of C.C. DeVille in late 1991. The album features the singles "Stand", "Until You Suffer Some (Fire And Ice)", "Body Talk" and "7 Days Over You".

== Production and marketing ==
Admitted as a full-fledged member of the band rather than a "hired gun", Kotzen was given considerable creative freedom. Resultingly, Kotzen's writing and performing contributions dominated the album.

Kotzen would later be expelled from the band following the world tour, after it was discovered that he had been romantically involved with the former fiancée of drummer Rikki Rockett. Recollections of the album, while no doubt soured by these events, nonetheless appear to faithfully reflect the basic clash between Kotzen's style and that of the band's founding members. Kotzen would later claim that "being in Poison helped me forget I was a musician" while Rockett would lament the loss of the band's original "attitude"

The album was recorded and mixed at A&M Studios in Hollywood, California, and Rumbo Recorders in Canoga Park, California with producer Richie Zito. It was dedicated to Van Halen tour manager Scotty Ross and former Poison guitarist C. C. DeVille. The album peaked at #16 on the Billboard chart.

The first two singles "Stand" and "Until You Suffer Some (Fire And Ice)" featured music videos and charted in the US and the UK. "Stand" reached number 15 on the Mainstream rock chart, #35 on the Top 40 Mainstream chart and #50 on the Billboard Hot 100. The song also charted at number 25 on the UK Singles chart and "Until You Suffer Some (Fire And Ice)" peaked at number 32 on the UK Singles chart.

Following the album the band released a video/DVD titled Seven Days Live which featured a concert from the Native Tongue world tour.

== Composition ==
Native Tongue is a rock album with an occasionally rootsy sound, and stirs the band's sound into blues rock territory. Songs written together by Bret Michaels and Richie Kotzen reveal the bluesy influence of Van Halen, such as "Blind Faith", "Bastard Son of a Thousand Blues" and "Body Talk", the latter a sex song typical of the band. Several songs, including "Stand", contain heavy gospel overtones and blues elements. Ultimate Classic Rock journalist Martin Kielty recalls that Poison "wanted to move away from their party-hard reputation and prove themselves as quality songwriters and take their fans with them. More than anything else, they wanted to move forward without guitarist C.C. DeVille, who'd been fired after a drug-fueled breakdown in relations."

"Native Tongue" has been described as a liberal homage to Fleetwood Mac's "Tusk" (1979); in contrast, "The Scream" and "Stay Alive" have been compared to Aerosmith's Toys in the Attic (1975). "Stand" features Sheila E. on percussion and is comparable to Mr. Big's "To Be with You", and John Mellencamp. "Until You Suffer Some (Fire and Ice)" is an AOR ballad. Kotzen is the showcase of "Richie's Acoustic Thang", which has been compared to Van Halen's "Spanish Fly". "Ain't That the Truth" is a quirky song comparable to David Lee Roth-era Van Halen, whereas "Theatre of the Soul" was described by one reviewer as resembling a rearranged version of "Every Rose Has Its Thorn" with different lyrics. "Bastard Son of a Thousand Blues" features harp and honky-plonk piano and has been compared to a fusion of John Lee Hooker and ZZ Top, but contains a self-effacing self-awareness that critic Deborah Frost separated it from the band's "MTV class" peers.

Lyrically, the band continued on the growing sophistication that began in Flesh & Blood. The album's themes include battles against injustice ("Scream", "Stand"), heartbreak ("Until You Suffer Some", "7 Days Over You", "Theatre of the Soul"), and inner demons ("Stay Alive").

"When the Whip Comes Down" is a track not included on the album but used as a B-side for the singles.

== Release and commercial performance ==
Although Poison's previous album, Flesh & Blood (1990), had enjoyed triple-Platinum success in the United States, several critics noticed that tastes had changed in the intervening three years, with Native Tongue being released into a more uncertain era for the band amid the popularity of grunge music and the dwindled popularity of glam metal. Deborah Frost noted that "while Poison's been off in rehab, the kids who sank for its hooks three years ago are now getting high on teen spirit." Dave Reynolds called Native Tongue "the start of a new era for Poison. Whether they will enjoy a fruitful time of it as they have in recent years, in the light of changing tastes and the ball-crushing recession currently gripping the American music industry, is debatable." Released on February 16, 1993, Native Tongue reached number 16 on the Billboard 200 and was supported by the lead single "Stand", followed by "Until You Suffer Some (Fire & Ice)" and "Body Talk", the latter of which—according to Kielty—was "the only one of the three that could be said to carry the rock energy Poison was known for. Michaels noted fan-mail suggestions that Kotzen just didn't fit in, and that he believed 'Stand' was too different to have been launched first." Native Tongue also spent three weeks on the UK Albums Chart, peaking at number 20, while "Stand" was the highest-charting British single, peaking at number 25 on the UK Singles Chart.

== Critical reception ==
Professional ratings
Review scores
Source	Rating
AllMusic	2/5 stars
The Encyclopedia of Popular Music	3/5 stars
Entertainment Weekly	C+
Kerrang!	4/5 stars
Music Week	3/5 stars
Q	3/5 stars
Rolling Stone	2.5/5 stars

Despite its relatively poor sales, Native Tongue earned Poison somewhat more positive notices in the rock press than earlier records. In his review for Kerrang!, Dave Reynolds commented that the introduction of Kotzen into the band had energized Michaels' contributions, commenting that several songs are Poison's best rock songs in years, and felt that although Native Tongue would "take more than a cursory listen to get into for most", it represents "a bold new ballgame for Poison." Q magazine called it "a punchy and confident record" that proves that Poison "rock like a bastard". Deborah Frost of Rolling Stone felt that Poison's self-awareness and "righteous goofiness" helped to offset how derivative the songs are with influences including Aerosmith and Lindsey Buckingham. She noted Kotzen's "passably whizlike" guitar work and praised Rockett's heavy drumming, but believed Poison "may have to dream up sharper material" in the future if they wished to keep their declining audience.

Music Week noticed that a new maturity, evident on the hit "Stand", delivers "an extra dimension" to the album, which they deemed the band's best album yet, and one which marks Poison, like Extreme before them, as a band that "can break out of the rock box and appeal to a wide audience." The magazine noted that "[there's] still plenty of heads down, no nonsense rawk 'n' roll, but there's an edge which surfaces during quieter tracks such as 'Until You Suffer Some' and 'Theatre of the Soul'." Entertainment Weekly's Greg Sandow noted that "Poison has recruited a gritty new lead guitarist, recorded a solid album full of grown-up lyrics, and generally moved their old pop-metal sound miles closer to ol'-fashioned, blues-based rock & roll." However, he believed the results were indistinguishable from many other bands. Retrospectively, Stephen Thomas Erlewine of AllMusic wrote that Native Tongue is "a bid for respect", with Poison largely eschewing their focus on party anthems for populist ballads, but believed that it often falls short, with Kotzen's playing "too proficient for the lite metal hooks that the rest of the band have mastered", but conceded that "Poison gets points for trying, and they do come up with some tracks, like the single 'Stand,' that could stand with some of their previous anthems."

In The Virgin Encyclopedia of Heavy Rock (1997), Colin Larkin wrote that Native Tongue "added brass with The Tower of Power Horns and established the band alongside Bon Jovi as purveyors of image-conscious, hard melodic rock." Axl Rosenberg and Christopher Krovatin, authors of the heavy metal guide Hellrasiers (2017), praise Native Tongue for being the strongest evidence of Poison's songwriting skills, adding that the addition of Kotzen—a "well-respected blues-rock guitarist"—delivered tasteful leads and soulful vocals (superior to Michaels') which "elevated the band's material to a level where it no longer seemed wholly ridiculous. It demonstrates that the foundations upon which Poison's music was built have always been solid—it's the decorations that are disgustingly garish."

== Track listing ==
All tracks are written by Bret Michaels, Bobby Dall, Rikki Rockett, and Richie Kotzen.

No.	Title	Length
1.	"Native Tongue"	1:03
2.	"The Scream"	3:51
3.	"Stand"	5:17
4.	"Stay Alive"	4:25
5.	"Until You Suffer Some (Fire and Ice)"	4:16
6.	"Body Talk"	4:03
7.	"Bring It Home"	3:57
8.	"7 Days over You"	4:15
9.	"Richie's Acoustic Thang"	0:58
10.	"Ain't That the Truth"	3:27
11.	"Theatre of the Soul"	4:43
12.	"Strike Up the Band"	4:17
13.	"Ride Child Ride"	3:55
14.	"Blind Faith"	3:34
15.	"Bastard Son of a Thousand Blues"	4:57
Total length:		56:20

== Personnel ==
Band members

- Bret Michaels – lead vocals, acoustic and rhythm guitar, harmonica
- Richie Kotzen – lead guitar, piano, mandolin, dobro, bass, backing vocals
- Bobby Dall – bass, backing vocals
- Rikki Rockett – drums, tribal drums, percussion

Additional musicians

- Jai Winding – piano (3 & 11)
- Billy Powell – piano (8 & 15)
- Mike Finnigan – organ (5)
- Tower of Power – horns (8)
- Timothy B. Schmit – backing vocals
- Tommy Funderburk – backing vocals
- First AME Church Choir (3)
- Sheila E. – percussion (1 & 2)

== Charts ==
Chart (1993)	Peak position
Australian Albums (ARIA)	60
Austrian Albums (Ö3 Austria)	39
Canada Top Albums/CDs (RPM)	26
Dutch Albums (Album Top 100)	54
Finnish Albums (The Official Finnish Charts)	17
German Albums (Offizielle Top 100)	60
Japanese Albums (Oricon)	39
Norwegian Albums (VG-lista)	39
Swedish Albums (Sverigetopplistan)	39
UK Albums (Official Charts)	20
US Billboard 200	16

== Certifications ==
Region	Certification	Certified units/sales
Canada (Music Canada)	Platinum	100,000^{^}
United States (RIAA)	Gold	500,000^{^}
^{^} Shipments figures based on certification alone.
