= Squeeze Box (song) =

- Solid centre variant of UK vinyl

Single by the Who

from the album The Who by Numbers
- B-side: "Success Story"
- Released: November 1975 (US); 9 January 1976 (UK)
- Recorded: 30 May 1975
- Studio: Shepperton soundstage, Surrey, England
- Genre: Rock; country
- Length: 2:42
- Label: Polydor (UK); MCA (US)
- Songwriter: Pete Townshend
- Producer: Glyn Johns

The Who US singles chronology
"Postcard" (1974)	"Squeeze Box" (1975)	"Slip Kid" (1976)

The Who UK singles chronology
"The Real Me" (1974)	"Squeeze Box" (1976)	"Who Are You" (1978)

"Squeeze Box" is a song by the English rock band the Who from their album The Who by Numbers. Written by Pete Townshend, the lyrics are couched in sexual double entendres. Unlike many of the band's other hits, the song features country-like elements, as heard in Townshend's banjo picking.

"Squeeze Box" was a commercial success, peaking at No. 10 on the UK Singles Chart and No. 16 in the US Billboard Hot 100. The song is also their only international number-one hit, reaching No. 1 in Canada, and No. 2 on the Irish singles chart.

== Background ==
"Squeeze Box" was originally intended for a Who television special planned in 1974. In the planned performance of the song, the members of the band were to be surrounded by 100 topless women playing accordions.

A demo of the song featured a Farfisa organ-based arrangement, as well as bluegrass banjos. Authors Steve Grantley and Alan Parker compared this early version to the Beatles' 1968 song, "Ob-La-Di, Ob-La-Da". This demo appeared on Pete Townshend's demo collection, Scoop.

"Squeezebox" is a slang term for accordions and related instruments. The song's lyrics consist mostly of sexual innuendo. Although Pete Townshend later said that the song originated as a dirty joke, he said that there was no double entendre, claiming "It's not about a woman's breasts, vaginal walls, or anything else of the ilk." The Who's bassist, John Entwistle also commented on the lyrics, saying "I dunno. Most songs have double meanings or no meaning at all. 'Squeeze Box' isn't that dirty. It doesn't say 'tits.'" Lead singer Roger Daltrey, however, acknowledged the double meaning, saying, "There's nothing wrong with a bit of 'in-and-out,' mate!"

"Squeeze Box" was released as the first single from The Who by Numbers in 1975 in America and 1976 in Britain. It became an international hit, becoming the band's first Top 10 hit in Britain since 1972's "Join Together". Despite this, Pete Townshend did not think highly of the song, and was astonished at its chart success.

I had bought myself an accordion and learned to play it one afternoon … The accordion gave the song a polka-esque rhythm, and the lyrics, which I wrote for fun, were intended as a poorly aimed dirty joke. I had no thought of it ever becoming a hit but amazingly recorded by the Who, to my disbelief. Further incredulity was caused when it became a hit for us in the USA.

Roger Daltrey, however, spoke positively of the song, praising its simplicity.

It's so refreshingly simple. An incredibly catchy song. It doesn't pretend to be anything other than what it is and I love it for that.

Record World said that "the group gives a display of their tremendous creative powers; a lilting rocker with all the immediacy of a 'Happy Jack.'"

PopMatters critic David Pike rated it one of the "41 essential pop/rock songs with accordion."

== Song composition ==
The song is written in three stanzas using the same closing refrain of "Mama's got a squeeze box/ Daddy never sleeps at night". The content of each stanza builds on the innuendo of the colloquial phrase of referring to a romantic partner as being some variation of being a "main squeeze" or simply referring to a boyfriend or girlfriend as a "squeeze". The first stanza is relatively ambiguous and introduces the main rhythm and beat of the song followed by the first instance of the refrain. The second stanza becomes more explicit with the romantic couple ignoring their pets and even their children when their nighttime activity commences stating, "'Cause she's playing all night", followed by the refrain. The third stanza becomes relatively undisguised in its use of metaphor referring to the couple's romantic activity as "in and out and in and out", followed by the closing instance of the refrain. The original version of the end of the song included the intonation of the words, "She goes, squeeze me, come on and squeeze me, Come on…", as the music faded out.

== Live performances ==
The song was first performed live at the New Bingley Hall in Stafford on 3 October 1975, and remained in the set for the rest of the 1975–1976 tour, until drummer Keith Moon's final North American concert at the Maple Leaf Gardens in Toronto on 21 October 1976. The band later played it again in the last leg of the 1982 Tour. The song was performed live again in 2014 during The Who Hits 50! tour.

== Chart performance ==
=== Weekly charts ===
The Who

Chart (1975–1976)	Peak position
Australia	45
Canadian RPM Top Singles	1
Ireland	2
New Zealand	26
UK	10
US Billboard Hot 100	16
US Cash Box Top 100	11

Freddy Fender

Chart (1979)	Peak position
US Billboard Hot Country Singles	61

=== Year-end charts ===
Chart (1976)	Position
Canada	21
US Billboard Hot 100	99

== Personnel ==
- Roger Daltrey – lead vocals
- Pete Townshend – guitar, banjo, accordion, backing vocals
- John Entwistle – bass, backing vocals
- Keith Moon – drums

== Other versions ==
Freddy Fender did the first cover of "Squeeze Box", in 1979. It was included on his 14th studio album, The Texas Balladeer. The song became a hit on the U.S. Country chart, reaching No. 61. Laura Branigan recorded a version of this song for her second studio album, Branigan 2, in 1983.

Poison in collaboration with Charlo recorded a version of the song and released it as a promo single from the album Hollyweird in March 2002. The song was re-released in 2007 on their album Poison'd!, where all the tracks are cover songs. Bobby Dall said on the cover of "Squeeze Box":

. . . Actually, that was Rikki's idea. When we came into rehearsals . . . to break the ice for the new record . . . before we started fightin' and arguin' about songs, we went through a list of covers and remakes. . . . It was the song that stuck and I think it fits perfectly for our band. It has a great melody and a great vocal, but it's also kinda sparse and undefined . . . it was kinda like an open palette for us.
