= I Want Action =

Single by Poison

from the album Look What the Cat Dragged In
- B-side: "Play Dirty"
- Released: May 20, 1987
- Recorded: 1986
- Genre: Glam metal
- Length: 3:05
- Label: Enigma/Capitol Records
- Songwriters: Bret Michaels; Bobby Dall; Rikki Rockett; C.C. DeVille
- Producer: Ric Browde

Poison singles chronology
"Talk Dirty To Me" (1987)	"I Want Action" (1987)	"I Won't Forget You" (1987)

Music videos
- "I Want Action" on YouTube

"I Want Action" is the third single from Glam metal band Poison, originally from the album Look What the Cat Dragged In.

== Background ==
The song was released as a single in 1987 on the Enigma label of Capitol Records, and peaked at number 50 on the Billboard Hot 100. "I Want Action" was the first party anthem from the band and was followed by their first ballad, the top 20 Billboard hit single "I Won't Forget You".

== Reception ==
Cash Box said that the song has Poison "at their resounding best," saying that "the tune is every bit as suggestive as its title, pouring on sex and incendiary guitars with a trowel."

== Music video ==
The music video begins at a diner where a waitress is serving food to the band. After a groupie asks for a backstage pass, the band performs on stage.

== Albums ==
On the 2006 re issue of Look What the Cat Dragged In - 20th Anniversary Edition the 7" single remix of the song was released.

"I Want Action" is on the following albums.

- Look What the Cat Dragged In
- Swallow This Live (live version)
- Poison's Greatest Hits: 1986-1996
- Power to the People (live version)
- The Best of Poison: 20 Years of Rock
- Look What the Cat Dragged In - 20th Anniversary Edition
- Poison – Box Set (Collector's Edition)
- Double Dose: Ultimate Hits

== Charts ==
Chart (1987)	Peak position
US Billboard Hot 100	50

== Uses in media ==
- During the opening credits of the 2003 comedy film Pauly Shore Is Dead
- In the 2009 indie comedy-drama film Adventureland
