= Talk Dirty to Me =

Single by Poison

from the album Look What the Cat Dragged In
- B-side: "Want Some, Need Some"
- Released: February 18, 1987
- Recorded: 1986
- Genre: Glam metal; pop metal; power pop
- Length: 3:44
- Label: Enigma/Capitol
- Songwriters: Bret Michaels; Rikki Rockett; Bobby Dall; C.C. DeVille
- Producer: Ric Browde

Poison singles chronology
| "Cry Tough" (1986) | "Talk Dirty to Me" (1987) | "I Want Action" (1987) |

Music videos
- "Talk Dirty to Me" on YouTube

"Talk Dirty to Me" is a single from American glam metal band Poison. Released on February 18, 1987, it was the second single from their debut album Look What the Cat Dragged In. The song peaked at No. 9 on the Billboard Hot 100, becoming the band's first top 40 hit in the United States and establishing Poison as one of the top-selling rock acts of the decade.

== Origins ==
The exact origins of the song are unclear. The song, an ode to teenage love inspired by an Eddie Cochran riff, was brought to Poison by guitarist C.C. DeVille when auditioning for the band in 1985. DeVille had refused to learn the band's material for the audition and instead insisted that they play a song he claimed to have written while with his previous band The Screaming Mimis, which turned out to be a primitive early version of "Talk Dirty To Me". Though the band was turned off by DeVille's brash personality, they saw tremendous potential in the song and hired the guitarist largely to get it into their repertoire.

The song's origins became murky when a defunct glam metal band called Kid Rocker sued Poison in 2011, claiming the song had in fact been written by them in the early 1980s. Kid Rocker were a Chicago band who, like Poison, moved to Los Angeles in search of fame. They signed with Atlantic Records in 1984 and had been a fixture on the Sunset Strip club scene at that time before breaking up. According to the lawsuit, DeVille had auditioned for Kid Rocker in 1984 and "Talk Dirty To Me" was one of their songs that DeVille had been asked to learn for the audition. Former Kid Rocker members Billy McCarthy (later of D'Molls) and James Stonich also alleged in the suit that the Poison songs "I Won't Forget You", "Fallen Angel" and "Ride The Wind" were also written by them and later stolen by DeVille. Lawyers for Poison dismissed the suit as "baseless", noting that if the allegation was true, the plaintiffs would be extremely unlikely to wait 25 years to seek remedy to the situation. The judge ultimately ruled in Poison's favor on April 8, 2013, ruling that the statute of limitations on copyright infringement had long since run out.

== Reception ==
The song was a smash hit upon its release in the winter of 1987, making it to No. 9 on the Billboard Hot 100 and establishing Poison as one of America's most popular acts of the eighties. In 2017, Billboard and OC Weekly ranked the song number one and number three, respectively, on their lists of the 10 greatest Poison songs.

The track was playable in the video game Guitar Hero III: Legends of Rock.

=== Music video ===
Classic Rock magazine ranked the music video for the song at No. 7 on their list of "The Top 10 Best Hair Metal Videos". The magazine declared that "If you really want to know why hair metal was so big, then this (song) is all you need."

== Charts ==
=== Weekly charts ===
| Chart (1987) | Peak position |
|---|---|
| Australian Singles (Kent Music Report) | 55 |
| Canada Top Singles (RPM) | 9 |
| UK Singles (Official Charts) | 67 |
| US Billboard Hot 100 | 9 |
| US Cash Box Top 100 | 15 |

=== Year-end charts ===
| Chart (1987) | Peak position |
|---|---|
| Canada Top Singles (RPM) | 74 |
